= The Square (restaurant) =

London fine dining restaurant

Coordinates: 51.5107°N 0.1441°W

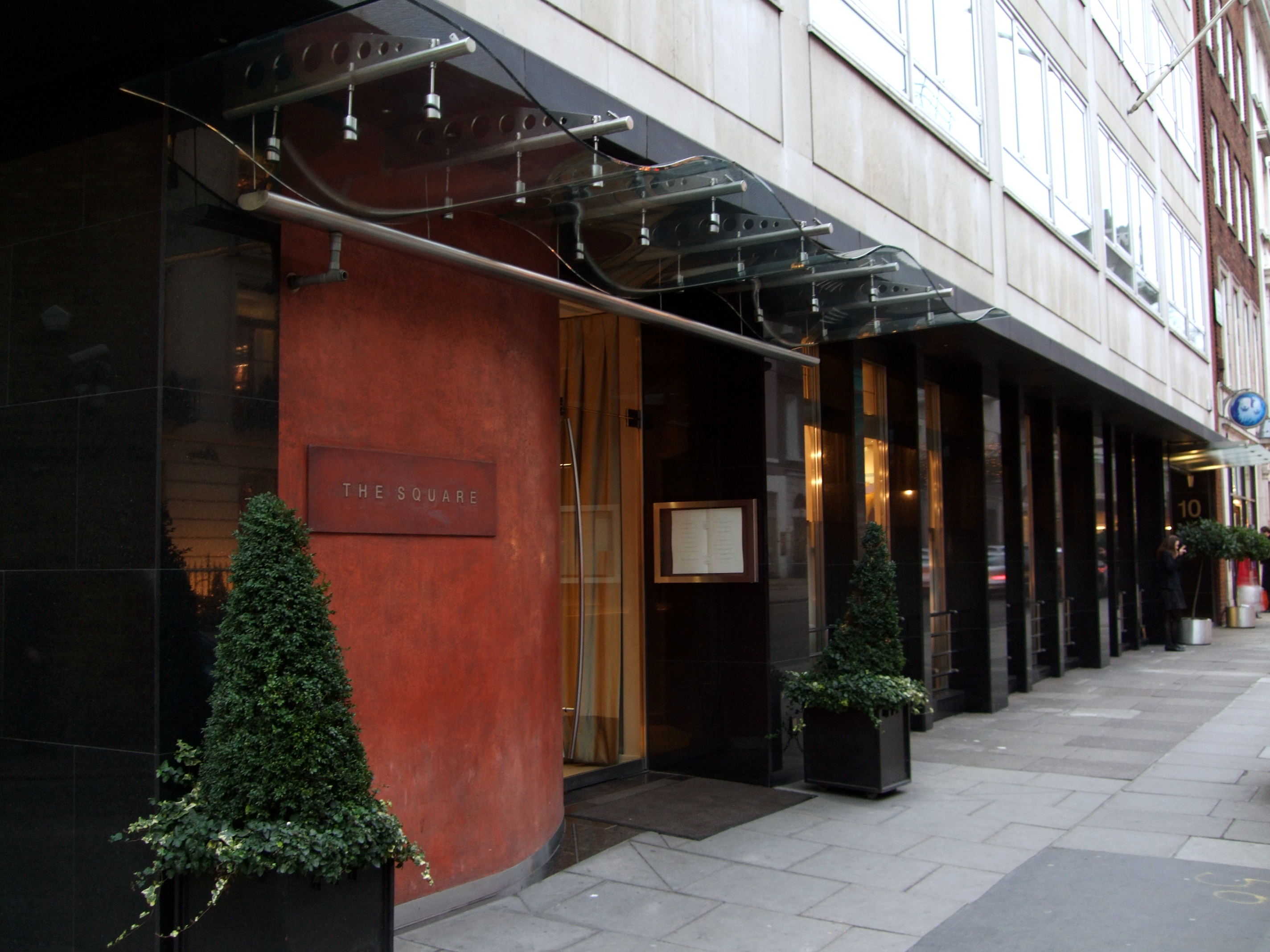
- The Square in 2008
- Interactive map of The Square

Restaurant information
- Established: 13 December 1991 (St James's); 17 February 1997 (Mayfair)
- Closed: 31 January 2020
- Previous owners: Phil Howard (1990s–2016); Nigel Platts-Martin (1991–2016); Marlon Abela (2016–2020)
- Head chef: Howard/Platts-Martin era: Phil Howard (chef patron; 1990s–2016); Rob Weston (1997/98–2013); Josh Pelham (2013); Gary Foulkes (2013–2016); Abela era: Dan Fletcher (2016); Yu Sugimoto (2016–2017); Clément Leroy (2017–2020)
- Food type: French
- Rating: Michelin stars: (1994–1998; 2017–2020); (1998–2016)
- Location: 32 King Street, St James's (1991–1997); 6-10 Bruton Street, Mayfair (1997–2020), London, SW1 (1991–1997); W1J (1997–2020), United Kingdom

The Square was a London fine dining restaurant, opened on 13 December 1991 in St James's. Since its opening, it had been co-owned by chef Phil Howard and wine expert Nigel Platts-Martin. It also earned its first Michelin star in 1994 and retained it from then on. After relocating to Mayfair in February 1997, The Square won a second Michelin star in 1998, which it retained until 2016, the same year when Howard and Platts-Martin sold the restaurant to a company held by Marlon Abela. It regained its first Michelin star in 2017. It closed on 31 January 2020, causing the restaurant to lose its star the following year.

== Background ==
Former Oxford-educated lawyer Nigel Platts-Martin and chef Marco Pierre White, co-owners of Harveys, planned to establish a second restaurant in West End. Platts-Martin and White's partnership of the project fell through. Furthermore, profits of the critically acclaimed Harveys were less than expected, disappointing Platts-Martin.

Phil Howard graduated from the University of Kent with a degree in microbiology but then, out of passion, pursued a career in cooking. Before the project, Howard started working at Harveys as a chef de partie in 1989. White sacked Howard after nine months of working there. Howard moved to another restaurant, Bibendum, to work as a chef de partie under head chef Simon Hopkinson. Howard was then rehired by White in 1990 to work at Harveys, specifically to be trained for White and Platts-Martin's upcoming second restaurant.

== 1991–1997: St James's ==
Phil Howard and Nigel Platts-Martin, both inexperienced in operating a restaurant at the time, opened without Marco Pierre White, what became known as The Square at 32 King Street, St James's, SW1 on 13 December 1991 near St James's Square, which inspired the name of the restaurant. Howard became the head chef of The Square at the time of its opening, and his cooking style had been contemporary French with simplicity and elegance. A restaurant critic Jonathan Meades in June 1992, described the original St James's location as "big, spacious, quirky" and its interior design as "pretty startling and very boldly coloured" with "[a] giantess's ear-ring hang[ing] [at a] window" and multiple gold leaf decorations.

Sales of The Square within one year since its opening were initially poor, but the restaurant became financially successful thereafter. The restaurant earned its first Michelin star in December 1994. The New York Times food critic Catharine Reynolds in November 1995 wrote, "The dining room is screened from the street by variegated ivy topiary and dangling metal spirals charitably described as gypsy earrings gone wrong".

The Square's menu changed monthly. In November 1995, The Square served eight first course dishes, including "seared tuna with a tartare of vegetables and soy-wilted greens and a warm salad of gam[é] and chestnuts". At the same time, "crisp-fried vegetables" was one of the second courses; venison with "mashed potatoes and carmelised onions", one of the main courses. Among the desserts, most of them "fruit-based", were a pithivier of prune purée "dosed with Armagnac" and a "sablé of raspberries".

== 1997–2016: Relocation to Mayfair ==
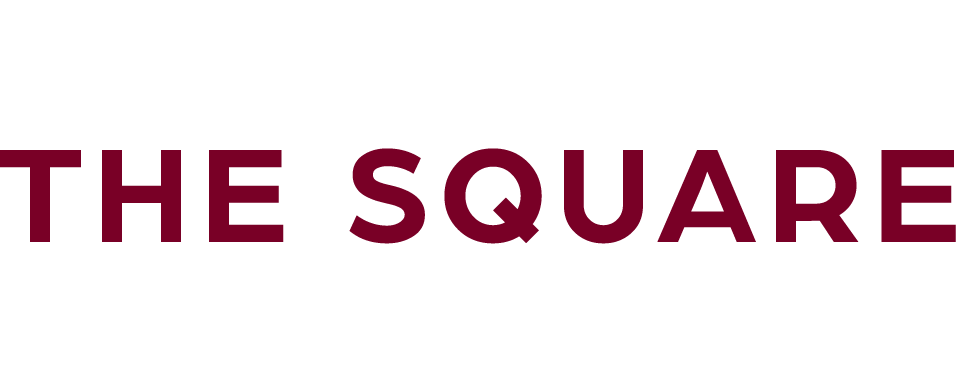
Website logo (up until 2017)

The Square relocated to 6-10 Bruton Street, Mayfair, W1J on 17 February 1997. Ben Rogers of The Independent in May 1997 described the Mayfair relocation as "very ritzy" and "appeal[ing] to the smart, international crowd". Rogers further said that the interior design of the newer location at the time contained "parquet flooring, variously coloured walls—some rendered, some white, one a rusty red—some colourful modern art, ugly brown upholstered chairs, one vaguely art-deco column and, as a centrepiece, a large bevelled mirror doing nothing in particular."

Mark Bittman of The New York Times in February 2001 noted the cuisine being "simply modern" more than "modern French", "large abstract oil paintings", and tables with flowers on top and covered by "skirts of dark crepe velvet" and "crisp linen".

In the mid-2000s, the interior design was refurbished.

== 2016: The Square transferred to Abela ==
After the 2008 financial crisis, The Square's lunch business was affected for a long time. After multimillion-pound Mayfair eateries Sexy Fish and Park Chinois opened in 2015, rents and premium rates increased for offices and other restaurants around the area, including The Square and Hibiscus. In March 2016, Howard and Platts-Martin, co-owner who had also been its wine expert for many years, sold The Square to Marlon Abela Restaurant Corporation (MARC), Marlon Abela's eponymous restaurant group, for US$4 million.

Howard, later in 2016 opened a new restaurant Elystan Street, where the menu is less complex than The Square's, with his business partner Rebecca Mascarenhas. It was the former site of chef Tom Aikens's eponymous restaurant in Chelsea, London. Elystan Street earned its first Michelin star in October 2017.

== Menu (Mayfair) under Howard's tenure ==
The Square offered seasonal (monthly or otherwise) menus, which it had been originally doing since its opening in St James's, set at a single price. Either The Square's list of wine, champagne, and burgundy, guided by a sommelier, had been at least eighty (or eighty-one) pages long, or the amount of wines (starting from £18.50 house wine) in the list had been at least 400. In May 1997, the menu included two-course meals at £35, including a set meal serving "a moist slice of seared salmon with samphire" as the first course; three-course meals at £40; and desserts, like a "warm apple fondant with apple sorbet [...] drizzled with a creamy apple syrup".

In March 1998, nine dishes were offered for each of the 2 and 3 course menus. A "velouté of truffles with tortellini of girolles and parmesan" was one of theamuse-bouches. Starter course choices for the two-course meal included "roast foie gras with caramelised endive and muscat grapes" and "a sauté of scallops and langoustines with chanterelles". Main course choices for the two-course included "herb-crusted saddle of lamb with white-bean puree and garlic" and "roast Bresse pigeon with a tarragon mousseline and foie gras".

In February 2001, one of the amuse-bouches was a "chilled cucumber soup [...] with a hint of celery". Among the first-course choices were "seasoned scallop-mussel soup" ("nage", according to the menu) "with white wine", and a "bresaola (dried beef), with a salad of haricot verts, favas, tomatoes and potatoes". Among the main-course choice were "a crisp-seared halibut in butter, with very buttery whipped potatoes and a chive sauce, white wine and baby shrimp"; and "a huge pile of lamb, mostly shoulder, some roasted and some stewed, along with white beans, confited tomatoes, rosemary, garlic and spinach [...] topped with a little sweetbread". Among desserts were an "apricot-almond tart" and "a shortbread sandwich filled with strawberries and crème fraîche [served] with vanilla ice cream".

In September 2015, a two-course lunch meal was £35; three-course lunch, £40; three-course meal from the à la carte menu, £95. Within a few years prior, slightly less salt and less dairy (like butter and cream) had been used on dishes. Among dishes served from the menu were "a tartare of line-caught mackerel with young beetroot and sour cream" also containing oysterleaf; a "steamed fillet of day boat turbot with Japanese mushrooms, smoked razor clams and kombu dashi" incorporated with "seaweed, white soy and katsuobushi (dried bonito flakes)"; "a warm velouté of Lincolnshire smoked eel with Jersey Royals, apple, leek hearts and oscietra caviar", which used curry leaves for seasoning rather than salt; "lasagne of Dorset crab with a cappuccino of shellfish and Champagne foam"; "tartare of milk-fed veal with burratina, white peach, artichoke and fennel"; a "roast fillet of line-caught sea bass with barbecued smoked eel, Savoy cabbage, hand-cut macaroni and red wine"; a "roast rib of dry-aged beef with caramelised onion, parsley and garlic purée, duxelles of girolles and red wine"; "Scottish raspberry soufflé with lemon verbena and raspberry ripple ice-cream"; and "Dorset blackcurrants with hibiscus and sour cream".

Howard wrote two volumes of The Square: The Cookbook: the first volume Savoury released in 2012; and second Sweet in 2013.

== Chefs under Howard and Platts-Martin ==
=== Head chefs ===
The Square had various head chefs while Howard had been its chef patron throughout most of his tenure. Rob Weston was one of the restaurant's chefs from December 1991 to 1993/1994. After working for three other world-class restaurants in London and Paris, Weston became its head chef in 1997 or 1998. In February 2013, Weston left The Square to become the head chef of Chiswick restaurant La Trompette, owned by Nigel Platts-Martin and Bruce Poole, which was reopened later after refurbishment.

Australian chef Josh Pelham worked previously as a sous-chef of Kitchen W8, one of the restaurants owned by Phil Howard, which earned its first Michelin star in 2011. Pelham was promoted to head chef, announced in early March 2013. Pelham was reported in August 2013 to have taken the lower role of senior sous-chef since then. In March 2014, Pelham left The Square to go to work at a Melbourne restaurant.

Gary Foulkes, one of The Square's sous chefs from 2005 to 2011, then succeeded Pelham in late March 2013 after Foulkes's two-year world traveling. Foulkes left The Square in March 2016 when it was sold to MARC. Foulkes later became the executive chef of Angler at South Place Hotel, owned by D&D London, in June 2016.

=== Other chefs ===
The Square had other chefs. One of the previous sous chefs was Neil Borthwick, husband of Angela Hartnett. Another was Australian chef Brett Graham, who started working at The Square in 2001 and became junior sous-chef in 2002. Graham left The Square to become the head chef (and then chef patron) of The Ledbury, which opened in 2005 and has been co-owned by Phil Howard and Nigel Platts-Martin.

Mark Kempson was a sous-chef for more than two years until 2009. Kempson became the head chef of Kitchen W8, which opened on 28 October 2009 under the co-ownership of Howard and Rebecca Mascarenhas.

Bruce Poole worked at the original St James's location of The Square as one of the chefs until January 1994. Poole would eventually establish a few restaurants, such as Chez Bruce (original site of Harveys), with The Square co-owner Nigel Platts-Martin as Poole's business partner.

Jun Tanaka previously worked at The Square as one of the chefs. In September 2001, Tanaka became the head chef of his restaurant QC, which later reopened as Pearl in May 2004.

== Reception under Howard's tenure ==
James Villas of Town & Country in June 1996 praised "Howard's brilliant, highly personal approach to modern British cookery" that had resulted in "intelligent, well-balanced" dishes. The Times restaurant critic Sheila Keating in November 1997 described his dishes as "exquisitely complex", which she found was one of reasons for the first Michelin star (1994). Another reviewer of The Times in October 2003 praised Howard's "striking modern twists" on French classical cuisine, like "seared loin of venison with deep-fried quail's egg and a salad of beetroot and apple".

The Square earned its second Michelin star in January 1998. It had also held four Rosettes by AA plc from 2007 to 2016 and scored eight out of ten in the Good Food Guide from 1999 to 2016. The Square was also awarded the BMW SquareMeal Restaurant of the Year in 2001 and 2007 and ranked seventh Britain's best restaurant at the 2012 National Restaurant Awards.

The Times named The Square in October 2003, one of top twenty "Haute cuisine restaurants" and in March 2007 one of top ten "restaurants for wine". The Times ranked the restaurant out of top 100 British restaurants number 12 in 2010 with a score of 9.63 out of ten, number 15 in 2011 with a 9.57 score, and number 18 in 2012. The Times in 2013 ranked it fifth out of the top ten restaurants for desserts and number 22 out of the top 100 British restaurants with a 9.57 score, noting Howard's unwillingness "to tamper with the classic French flavor combinations, tried and tested over generations" and criticism towards "modern restaurant cooking [that] has a tendency to overcomplicate. The Times ranked it down to number 35 in 2014 with a score of 9.54 and then number 42 in 2015 with a 9.52 score, praising its "'highly innovative' cuisine".

Surveys of diners by Zagat, released in November 2006, rated the food 27 out of 30, decor 22, and service 26. The average cost was US$156.

A. A. Gill in 2016 noted that most of the customers had been businesspeople and their clients. Participants of surveys conducted by Harden's often placed The Square as one of the top five London restaurants for business meetings: second in the 2005 edition, fourth in 2006, fifth in 2007, second in 2014, third in 2015, third in 2016, and second in 2017 (tied with Bleeding Heart Restaurant).

Survey participants conducted by Harden's ranked The Square the 15th most mentioned London restaurant and the eighth top London restaurant with "gastronomic experience" in 2015 (edition). They further ranked the restaurant the 17th most mentioned London restaurant in 2017.

== Co-owner Nigel Platts-Martin ==
One of The Square's co-owners, German-born Nigel Platts-Martin, whose father was an Army officer, attended The King's School, Canterbury and then the University of Oxford to study law. Later, he went on to work for law firms Freshfields Bruckhaus Deringer and S. G. Warburg & Co. before leaving to launch the restaurant Harveys in 1987 with its head chef Marco Pierre White. Under White and Platts-Martin as co-owners, Harveys earned its first Michelin star in January 1988 and then its second in January 1990. Then Platts-Martin and one of White's proteges Phil Howard established The Square in late 1991.

In 1992 or 1993, Platts-Martin and another shareholder bought remaining shares of Harveys from White, who left Harveys in July 1993. In February 1995, Platts-Martin and Bruce Poole, The Square's then-employee until January 1994, established Chez Bruce as the replacement of Harveys at Wandsworth Common. Chez Bruce earned its first Michelin star in early 1999. Platts-Martin and Poole also opened The Glasshouse at Kew in early 1999 and La Trompette in Chiswick in late January 2001. The Glasshouse earned its first Michelin star in 2002 under its first head chef Anthony Boyd. La Trompette has held one Michelin star since January 2008 under various head chefs, including (since 2013) The Square's former head chef Rob Weston.

Platts-Martin won the Independent Restaurateur of the Year at the 2004 Catey Awards for "quality, consistency and innovation" of his restaurants. He was appointed Member of the Most Excellent Order of the British Empire (MBE) at the 2009 New Year Honours for serving the British hospitality industry. Out of top 100 most influential people in the UK hospitality industry, The Caterer ranked Platts-Martin 72nd in 2005, 24nd in 2010, 40th in 2011, and 35th in 2012. A magazine Restaurant ranked him 18th out of "100 most powerful people in the restaurant industry" in April 2016. Based on a 2006 survey of 8,000 participants, Harden's named Platts-Martin's restaurant group as one of top three in London for "sheer consistency". The other two groups were that of Gordon Ramsay and of Caprice Group, owned by Richard Caring at the time.

== 2016–2020: Marlon Abela era until closure ==
=== Post-transfer history ===
Under Marlon Abela's ownership, the restaurant lost its two Michelin stars in October 2016. After the August 2017 closure for renovations, the restaurant regained its first Michelin star around the time of the October 2017 reopening.

In 2019, the Marlon Abela Restaurant Corporation (MARC) reported 2017 net losses and unpaid accounts. On 8 January 2020, MARC was liquidated after the High Court of Justice granted the HM Revenue and Customs's petition filed on 6 November 2019. On 31 January 2020, property administrators abruptly closed The Square and another MARC-owned restaurant, Morton's Club during their lunch hours. The administrators also seized other properties and assets of MARC, including the Michelin-starred Greenhouse restaurant, which has been closed since late June 2020. After its closure, The Square lost its Michelin star in January 2021.

=== Post–2016 reception ===
In December 2017, Ben McCormack of The Telegraph wrote that The Square was not the same signature restaurant associated with chef Phil Howard and that the soul of The Square departed when Howard moved to Elystan Street, where he currently cooks. Nonetheless, McCormark appreciated Abela's efforts to run the "formal fine dining" restaurant, which "is an increasingly narrow and niche market". The Week restaurant critic in February 2018 said that the "stylish" food lacked flavour. For example, both the sirloin steak and roast lamb "looked stunning, but tasted indistinguishable".

=== Head chefs under Abela ===
During MARC's ownership, Dan Fletcher, The Square's sous chef under Howard, was promoted to head chef in March 2016. In September 2016, Japanese-born Yu Sugimoto succeeded Fletcher. Sugimoto left the position in August 2017 before the restaurant's refurbishment and returned to Japan for his family. The Square's final head chef was Clément Leroy from November 2017 to January 2020, when it closed down.
