= Jun Tanaka (chef) =

British television chef

- Born: Jun Tanaka; 18 November 1971 (age 54); New York City, U.S.
- Occupation: Chef
- Culinary career
- Cooking style: European cuisine
- Rating
- Michelin stars
- Current restaurant
- The Ninth

Jun Tanaka (born 18 November 1971) is an American-born Japanese-British television chef, best known for presenting Channel 4's Cooking It as well as appearing in Saturday Kitchen on BBC One. He was the third Grand Champion of the American competitive cooking show, Chopped.

== Early life and education ==
On 18 November 1971, Jun Tanaka was born in New York City, US, to a chemical engineer and a housewife. When he was seven in 1978, his family moved from New York City to England. In 1989, his parents returned to Japan while Tanaka and his older brother, an orthopaedic surgeon, continued living in England.

Armed with a list of restaurants from his father, Tanaka approached each to gain a position as an apprentice. At the top of the list were Le Gavroche, Chez Nico and Marco Pierre White’s restaurant Harvey's.

== Career ==
In 1990, 19-year-old Tanaka's first apprenticeship was at Le Gavroche under the Roux Brothers, and went on to work and train at Chez Nico and The Capital as chef de partie under Philip Britten. He then worked at Les Saveurs as chef de partie under Joel Antunes for two years. He then worked at The Restaurant, Marco Pierre White, and The Oak Room as a sous chef under Marco Pierre White, before moving to The Square as junior sous chef under Philip Howard and onto Chavot under Eric Chavot as sous chef.

In 2004, Tanaka became the executive head chef of the Renaissance London Chancery Court Hotel's Pearl Restaurant and Bar, a fine dining establishment that specialises in French cuisine.

In addition to his job as Pearl executive chef, Tanaka partnered with Notting Hill Brasserie's head chef Mark Jankel in 2009 to set up a venture using a street catering van, Street Kitchen, to produce and sell gourmet lunches, using 100% British produce, at various London locations.

At the end of 2012, Jun left Pearl to open his own restaurant in central London. Named 'The Ninth', it opened in November 2015 in Charlotte Street. It was awarded a Michelin star in the 2017 Michelin Guide, which it has retained every year since.

== Television and books ==
Tanaka hosted the Channel 4 programme Cooking It in 2006, and has made appearances in BBC One's Saturday Kitchen, UKTV's Great Food Live, ITV's Saturday Cooks, and BBC Two's Food Poker as a resident chef in 2007.

He is currently a regular fixture on UKTV's Market Kitchen, and has made a regular appearance on ITV's Daily Cooks Challenge and BBC's MasterChef: the Professionals.

In 2009, Simon & Schuster published Tanaka's book "Simple to Sensational", which offers recipes and guidance for beginners in fine-dining cookery.

In 2013, Tanaka won the Grand Finale of Chopped Champions, which pitted 16 previous Chopped Champions against each other for $50,000. He stated that his prize money would be invested in his new restaurant.
