= The Box Tree =

Restaurant in Ilkley, West Yorkshire, England

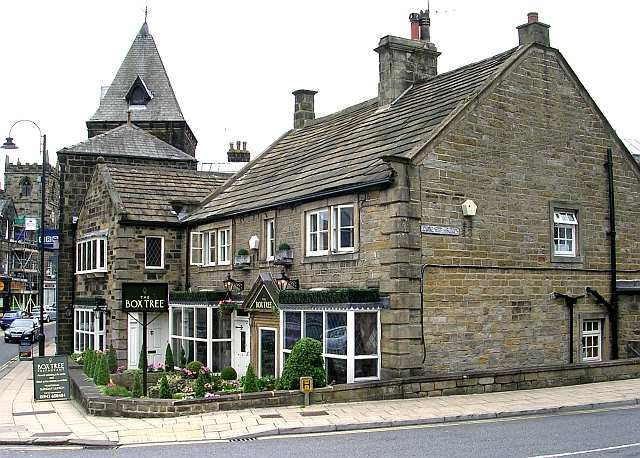

- Location of the restaurant within West Yorkshire

Restaurant information
- Established: 1962
- Owner: Newett Family
- Chef: Kieran Smith
- Food type: Modern French
- Rating: Michelin Guide (2005); AA Rosettes (2026)
- Location: 35–37 Church Street, Ilkley, West Yorkshire, England
- Coordinates: 53°55′34″N 1°49′32″W
- Website: Official website

The Box Tree is a restaurant in Ilkley, West Yorkshire, England. It is owned by Yorkshire businessman Adam Frontal. It was previously operated by chef Simon Gueller and his wife, Rena, from 2005 to late 2022. Under their management, the restaurant had been redecorated, although elements from the original owners of remain. Reception by food critics has improved over the years; the restaurant held a single Michelin star until 2019 and three AA rosettes.

The Box Tree opened originally as a tearoom in 1962, and went on to become one of the first four British restaurants to win two stars in 1977, under head chef Michael Lawson. After losing both stars, it regained a star between 1996 and 2001, whilst owned by Helen Avis. In 2010, former employee Marco Pierre White bought into the restaurant. It serves modern French cuisine, and has also been awarded three AA rosettes and listed in Harden's restaurant guide.

== Description ==
The Box Tree has been located at 35–37 Church Street in Ilkley since its original opening under Malcolm Reid and Colin Long in 1962. It has been operated by Simon and Rena Gueller since 2004, originally under lease from the previous operator. Gueller had previously been head chef at the Michelin-starred restaurant Rascasse. The Guellers also run a sister company called Box Tree Events, which provides outside catering.

After being purchased by the Guellers in 2004, the Box Tree was redecorated and modernised, the décor having become shabby under previous owners. The new decorations included recessed lighting and fabric-covered walls. There is a fireplace in the centre of the dining room, with an 18th-century settle (a type of bench) beside it. Elements from the Reid and Long era remain, with the bar and ceilings still recognisable.

=== Menu ===
The current menu still has elements from the earlier days of the restaurant, such as lobster thermidor and grouse. Chef Gueller produces modern French cuisine, with classical elements. Dishes include a terrine of foie gras served with a salad of smoked eel, alongside apple served both as a jelly and as a purée. Foie gras was temporarily taken off the menu in 2008 following threats of protests from animal rights activists. It was later restored, and has also since been served with a duck terrine and pistachios.

To celebrate the 45th anniversary of the Box Tree in 2008, Gueller recreated elements of the 1963 menu, but decided not to make certain dishes such as chicken chasseur or melon boats. Other parts of the original menu included crêpes and half a grilled grapefruit. The dishes selected were included for a week in a six course 1960s set menu.

== History ==
The sandstone building dates back to the 1720s. It was purchased by Reid and Long in 1962, who initially operated the premises as a tea room. The Box Tree gained two Michelin stars in 1977; that year's list was the first with two star restaurants in the UK (the others were the Waterside Inn, Le Gavroche and the Connaught).

Following the Michelin stars, the Box Tree became a hot-spot for celebrities, with the singer Johnny Mathis being a regular. Shirley Bassey and Margaret Thatcher were seen at the restaurant. In 1979, the future multi-Michelin star chef Marco Pierre White began working at the Box Tree at the age of 17, under Reid and Long; he received his training there. He recalled in his book White Heat that the Box Tree made him obsessed with food and he still considers it his spiritual home.

After holding the two Michelin stars until 1988, and then losing its single star in 1991, in 1992 the Box Tree went into receivership and was purchased by Helen Avis. Under chef Thierry LePratre-Granet, it was restored to a single Michelin star in 1996. White returned as a consultant in 1994, which lasted two months and ended in a court case against him with damages of £880 awarded after he damaged a ceiling.

LePratre-Granet left in 2001, and was replaced by Toby Hill, the youngest chef ever to hold a Michelin star. The change of chef also changed the style of food served to a "Mediterranean slant", which ended when Hill left after only seven months. He was replaced by Shane Goodway in 2002 and the style reverted to traditional French. The Box Tree lost the Michelin star in the 2003 edition of the guide and was no longer included in either the AA Restaurant Guide or the Good Food Guide. Goodway left the kitchen shortly after the restaurant lost the Michelin star, but stated that the decision had been taken before they had been informed.

The Guellers leased the Box Tree from Avis in 2004. Within five months of re-opening it regained a Michelin star. Having been friends with Simon Gueller since they were teenagers, Marco Pierre White returned to the restaurant in 2007 to film segments for the ITV1 cookery reality television show Hell's Kitchen. White said he aspired to work with Gueller to return the Box Tree to its former status as a two-Michelin-starred restaurant.

== Reception ==
Jan Moir reviewed the Box Tree in 2004 for The Daily Telegraph shortly after Gueller took over and refurbished it. She praised the lighter style of the food under the new chef and, although she was initially concerned over the waiter suggesting squab pigeon, she described the dish as "neatly executed", and the most successful dish that she tasted. She thought that the chef was good, but needed time to settle in and described his wife Rina in front of house as a "complete natural". Jay Rayner visited the Box Tree n 2005, prior to it being awarded a new Michelin star. He pointed out some problems regarding menu pricing as there were differences in prices on the website as opposed to in person. He thought that the scallops were undercooked, and the brioche served with a beef tenderloin arrived soggy. He said that the dishes "showed an understanding of the fundamentals", but were not of particular note.

In 2012, Jill Turton ate at the Box Tree for the Yorkshire Post following the restaurant's fiftieth anniversary, and described some dishes, such as asparagus and a soft-boiled egg which had been cooked in a bain-marie, as "perfect". She described the meal overall as "terrific", but said that the desserts were not a stretch for the kitchen, having ordered a chocolate brownie.

Harden's, a British restaurant guide, describes the food as "light and delicious", and the cooking as "exemplary". In its review system, it rates the food as one out of five (one being the highest rating available), and both service and ambiance as two out of five. The Automobile Association has awarded the Box Tree three AA rosettes.
