= Elystan Street =

Restaurant in London, England

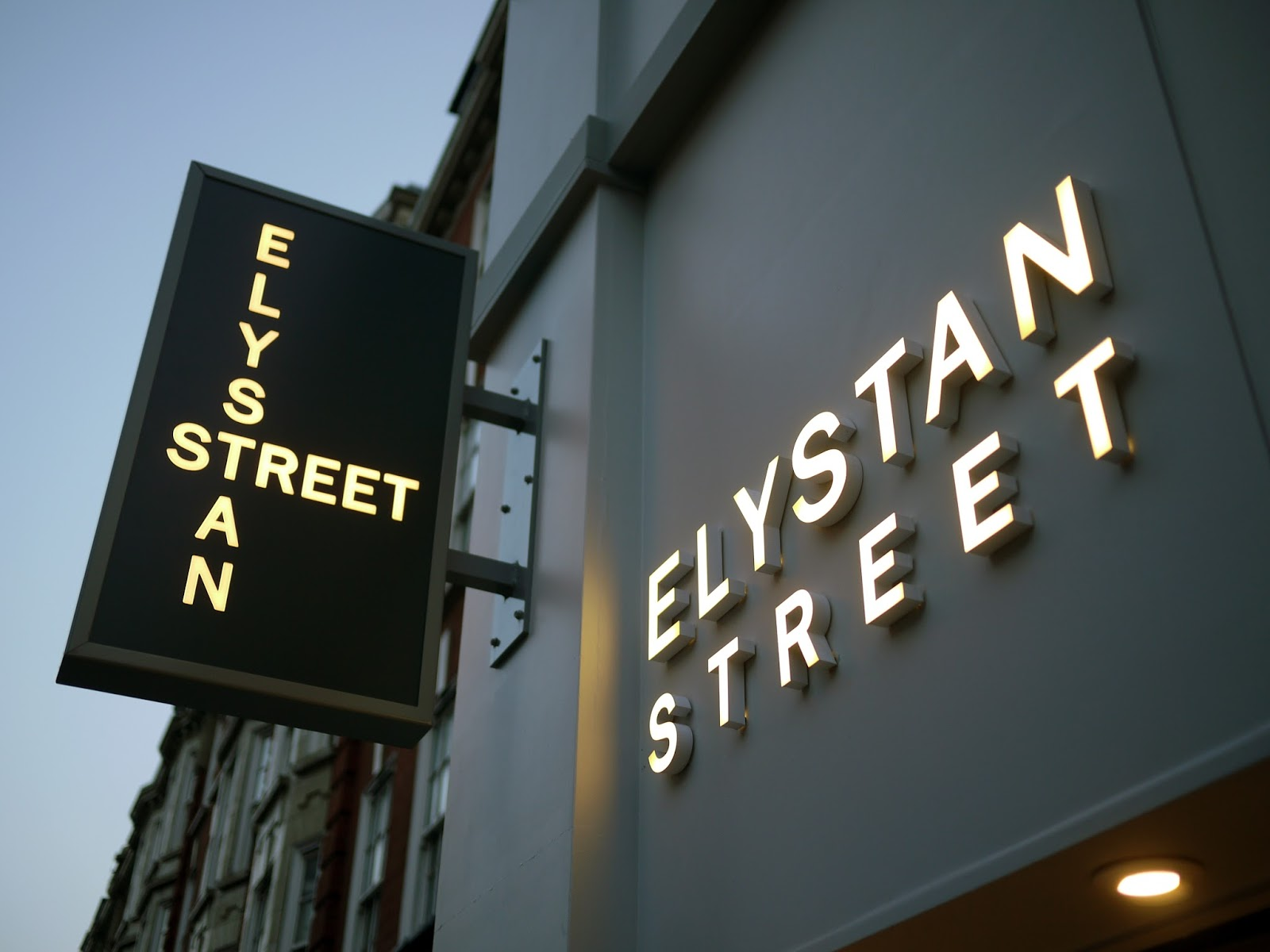
- Restaurant signs in 2016
- Interactive map of Elystan Street

Restaurant information
- Established: 27 September 2016
- Owners: Phil Howard, also chef patron Rebecca Mascarenhas
- Head chef: Toby Burrowes (2016–2020)
- Rating: Michelin stars: (2017–present)
- Location: 43 Elystan Street, Chelsea, London, SW3, United Kingdom
- Coordinates: 51.4916°N 0.1677°W
- Website: www.elystanstreet.com

Elystan Street is a London restaurant co-owned by chef patron Phil Howard and Rebecca Mascarenhas. Howard and Mascarenhas established the restaurant on 27 September 2016, six months after Howard sold and left his previous restaurant The Square. Elystan Street earned its first Michelin star in October 2017 and has retained it since.

== Background ==
Phil Howard had been a chef patron of The Square since its opening at St James's in December 1991. The Square earned its second Michelin star in 1998, one year after its relocation to Mayfair in 1997. In March 2016, after eighteen years of holding two Michelin stars, Howard and his business partner Nigel Platts-Martin sold The Square to its newer owner Marlon Abela.

Elystan Street was the former location of chef Tom Aikens's Michelin-starred eponymous restaurant, which was operated from 2003 to January 2014, aside from temporary closure for refurbishment from July 2011 to January 2012. Prior to establishment of Aikens's restaurant, the site was also the former location of a pub Malborough Arms.

== History ==
On 27 September 2016, Phil Howard and Rebecca Mascarenhas opened a new London restaurant Elystan Street, a former site of chef Tom Aikens's eponymous restaurant (out of Aikens's restaurants), located at 43 Elystan Street, Chelsea. In contrast to The Square, Elystan Street is less formal and more casual. The menu is at least 25% vegetarian and less complex than The Square's, and Howard's cooking skills are not as "fiddly, technical" as they had been while operating The Square. Under Howard as its current chef patron, Elystan Street earned its first Michelin star in 2017.

Toby Burrowes, who worked under Howard in The Square, was the head chef of Elystan Street from its debut to February 2020. Aaron Potter, previously head chef of the Italian-inspired London restaurant La Goccia at Petersham Nurseries Covent Garden, succeeded Burrowes in that same year.

== Menus ==
Menus for the restaurant have been seasonal. When the restaurant debuted in 2016, served as starter course were "roasted vegetable salad with curry oil and cashew hummus"; "smoked mackerel veloute with Porthilly oysters, leek hearts and smoked eel toasts"; langoustine ravioli in a shellfish broth; and sweetbreads with barbecue dressing, hispi cabbage, and sweetcorn. Served as main course were "fillet of cod with curried cauliflower purée, coriander and lime"; "loin of lamb with pesto roasted aubergine, garlic purée, olives and balsamic vinegar"; and barbary duck breast. Served as dessert course were lemon tart and "smashed brownie with chocolate foam and hazelnut ice cream".

Among dishes served in April 2018 were a langoustine tartare and a duck salad with caramelized vegetables and red onion. Served in May 2018 were a veal tartare with Caesar cream and white asparagus and a sea trout fillet with crushed Jersey Royals and emulsion of mussels, leeks and mousserons. The following year, a sea beet, a citrus, and shrimp butter replaced the emulsion for the sea trout dish.

Among dishes served in September 2020 were Cumbrian beef tartare with artichoke, pickled girolles, mimolette, and shot of beef tea; strozzapreti with smashed courgette, tomatoes, Scottish girolles, garlic and Parmesan; chicken breast with fricassee of Scottish girolles, crayfish, sweet corn and spinach; Cornish red mullet fillet with olive oil creamed potato, piperade, tomato, fennel and olives; and bitter chocolate and salted caramel tart with crème fraîche ice cream.

== Reception ==
A. A. Gill in October 2016 noted the "topless" menu lacking "tasting lists, or [sic] wine-twinned dishes, palate cleansers, prestarters or baroque breadbaskets" but praised course meals that Gill ordered. Luxury Travel Intelligence (LTI) wrote in March 2018, "The interior is stylish, with moody lighting and chic, concrete tables." LTI also noted cocktails served despite having no bar. Ben McCormack of The Telegraph noted "baby" blue and pink chairs, lack of tablecloths, and collection of artworks by Henry Moore and Patrick Caulfield; McCormack called Elystan Street restaurant one of the best Chelsea restaurants in 2018 and 2019.

Food critic Neal Martin of wine publication Vinous in September 2020 praised a beef tartare dish as "a stunning opener", a strozzapreti dish as "delicious" despite being less exciting than the tartare and "a little safe", a red mullet dish as "well cooked and seasoned" despite being "conservative", and a tart dish as "nigh perfect". Martin criticised a chicken breast dish for its "tad too rich" sauce and lackluster combination of ingredients. He also noted the restaurant's lack of amuse-bouches and tasting menus since its debut. Overall, Martin found the menu not as good as the one at The Square under Howard; nevertheless, Martin recommended Elystan Street for fans of Howard who can afford the menu.
