= Bertus Basson =

South African chef (born 1979)

- Born: Bertus Hendrik Basson; 12 April 1979 (age 47); Cape Town, Western Cape, South Africa
- Occupations: Chef, entrepreneur, TV personality,
- Website: bertusbasson.com

Bertus Hendrik Basson (born 12 April 1979) is a South African chef, restaurateur, entrepreneur and TV personality best known for his work as head chef of Overture in Stellenbosch, Western Cape.

== Early life ==
After being born in Cape Town in 1979, Bertus was brought up in Polokwane, Nelspruit and Witbank. He began to help his mother with cooking in the kitchen at a young age. Growing up, Basson also worked as a waiter at Spur Steak Ranches, as well as at a liquor store and a toy store.

== Career ==
Bertus Basson began working in the culinary career when he was 17 years old. He moved to London at the age of 19 to work at the Michelin starred restaurant Chez Bruce. Basson began his first catering business, All Things Culinary, in 2005. In 2007, Bertus was named Unilever Chef of the Year, before establishing his first restaurant, Overture in November. Overture has been awarded distinguished accolades from both the Eat Out Guide and Rossouws Restaurant Guide while under his leadership.

Basson appeared as a judge on Season 1, 2, 3 and 4 of the national cooking show The Ultimate Braai Master on SABC 3. He also appears as a guest on the lifestyle TV show Top Billing as well as the daily talk show Expresso.

Basson was crowned with "Chef of the Year" at the 2019 South African EatOut Awards for his work at Eike and Overture.

== Restaurants ==
Year Opened	Restaurant	Location
2007	Overture	Hidden Valley Wine Estate, Stellenbosch, South Africa
2016	Spek & Bone	Stellenbosch, South Africa
2017	The Deck at Hidden Valley	Hidden Valley Wine Estate, Stellenbosch, South Africa
2017	Die Vrije Burger	Stellenbosch, South Africa
2018	Eike	Stellenbosch, South Africa
2025	Ongetem	Cape Town, South Africa

== Books ==
Bertus Basson has two books to his name:

- Homegrown (2017, Jacana Media; ISBN 9781928247081)
- Being Bertus Basson (2018, Jacana Media; ISBN 9781431426416)

== Awards and nominations ==
Year	Organization	Award	Work	Result	Ref.
2019	EatOut Mercedes-Benz Restaurant Awards	Chef of the Year	Himself	Won	
2019	EatOut Mercedes-Benz Restaurant Awards	Top 10 Restaurants	Eike	Included	
