= The Restaurant Marco Pierre White =

Former restaurant in London

- The location of the Hyde Park Hotel within London

Restaurant information
- Established: 14 September 1993
- Closed: 15 February 2002
- Head chef: Éric Chavot (1994–95); Robert Reid (1997–99); Jeff Galvin (2000)
- Chef: Marco Pierre White (1993–99); Robert Reid (2000–2002)
- Pastry chef: Roger Pizey
- Food type: French; haute cuisine
- Rating: Michelin guide (1995–99)
- Location: Hyde Park Hotel; 66 Knightsbridge, London, SW1X 7LA, United Kingdom
- Coordinates: 51°30′08″N 0°09′36″W
- Other locations: 1997–2002: Le Méridien Piccadilly Hotel; 21 Piccadilly; London

The Restaurant Marco Pierre White, also known as The Restaurant, Restaurant Marco Pierre White and later Oak Room Marco Pierre White, was a restaurant run by chef proprietor Marco Pierre White. The Restaurant was opened at the Hyde Park Hotel, London, on 14 September 1993, after White left his previous restaurant, Harveys. Following the move, the kitchen staff was more than doubled in number, and White used Pierre Koffmann's La Tante Claire as a template to pursue his third Michelin star. This was awarded in the 1995 Michelin guide. White then moved the restaurant to the Le Méridien Piccadilly Hotel, London, in 1997, taking on the listed Oak Room as the main dining room. He sought a further rating of five red forks and spoons in the guide, to gain the highest possible rating for the restaurant. It gained this award in the following guide.

When White retired in December 1999, he gave back the Michelin stars, but under Robert Reid, The Restaurant won a single star again in the 2001 and 2002 editions of the guide before closing later that year. During the course of The Restaurant's two locations, White sought to develop the techniques used in the dishes and expand the range of food on offer. The space used at Harveys was inadequate for his plans, but with the Hyde Park Hotel location he was able to add elements which were braised or made confit. At the Oak Room, both chickens and lamb were cooked each day just for pressed juices with which to make sauces for other dishes. The Restaurant was critically acclaimed, with critics such as Michael Winner, A. A. Gill and Jonathan Meades praising the food served, as did Egon Ronay, who gave the restaurant a maximum three stars in his restaurant guide.

== History ==
Having won two Michelin stars at the restaurant Harveys, chef Marco Pierre White felt restricted in the size of the premises as he sought to challenge for a third star. He was introduced to Rocco Forte, chairman of Rocco Forte Hotels, by actor Michael Caine. Forte had begun entering into arrangements with Michelin starred chefs, with Nico Ladenis holding stars at Chez Nico within Forte's Grosvenor House Hotel in Mayfair.

After meeting with Caine and Forte, White was taken to the grill restaurant at the Hyde Park Hotel. Forte was interested if White could transfer the Michelin stars from Harveys; White was open to this since Raymond Blanc had previously transferred two stars to Le Manoir aux Quat'Saisons when he moved his restaurant from Summertown, Oxford. Following the agreement of Michelin, White left Harveys in July 1993; The Restaurant was opened at the Hyde Park Hotel less than two months later, on 14 September. The interior was decorated with paintings from White's own collection.

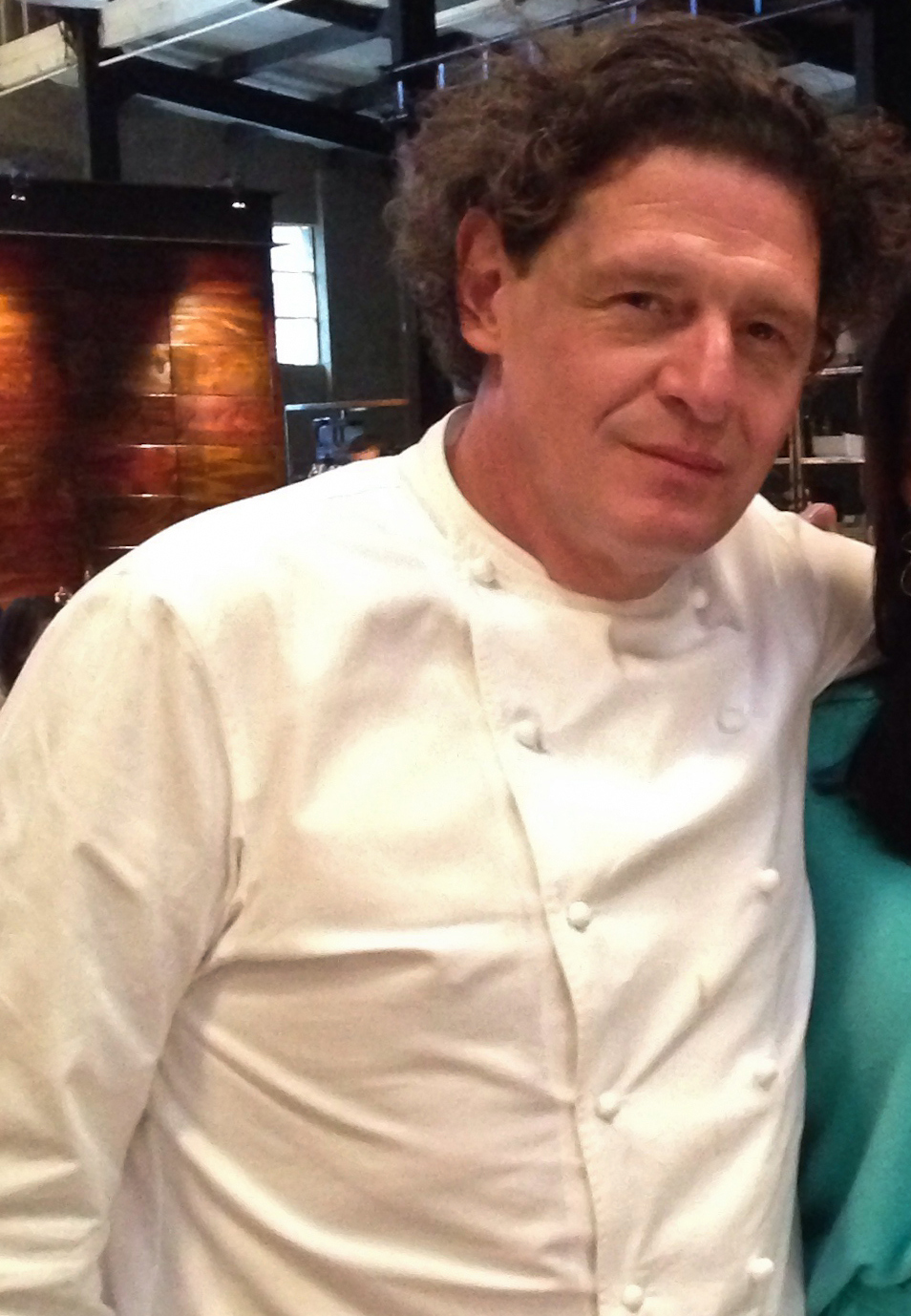
Marco Pierre White in 2012

The Restaurant was the first time White had a kitchen staff organised into traditional brigades such as he had worked in while at the Roux brothers' Le Gavroche. At Harveys, White had eight chefs under him on average, which was expanded to a team of about 20 at The Restaurant. Five of the chefs moved from Harveys to The Restaurant with him,along with a former Harveys chef and several others who joined from other Michelin starred restaurants from the UK and France. This enabled White to adopt a structure with himself, a head chef, a team of four or five sous chefs and teams on fish, meat/sauce, larder and pastry. Each of those sections was then broken down into a chef de partie heading the team, and then commis chefs under them. By 1994, Éric Chavot had joined the brigade as head chef under White. He left the following year to open the restaurant Interlude de Chavot, with White's assistance.

The chefs were initially surprised at how busy they were at lunchtimes; Harveys had been based next to Wandsworth Common and so the typically slow lunch service was used to give the chefs a break. Now based near Hyde Park, they had four or five times the number of covers for a lunch service than before. White remained determined to gain his third Michelin star, and to achieve this, he sought to emulate and surpass the food and service at Pierre Koffmann's three Michelin star restaurant La Tante Claire. White worked 14/15-hour days for six days a week, expecting similar hours from those chefs under him, with the restaurant only closed on Sundays.

After White won his third Michelin star in 1995, he found a new obsession. While 54 restaurants across Europe had three stars at the time, there was a further rating system used by Michelin called the knives and forks. They were awarded for elements such as ambience and aesthetics, and came in two colours – the basic black awards and the superior red awards. White wanted his restaurant to be the undisputed best restaurant in the UK, since La Tante Claire, the Waterside Inn and Le Gavroche had each only gained four. With these in mind, White moved the restaurant from the Hyde Park Hotel to the Le Méridien Piccadilly Hotel, closing at the initial location on 16 August 1997. White took the 207 square metres (2,230 sq ft) listed Oak Room as the main dining room of the restaurant, opening there two weeks later. This had become available after Granada plc bought the hotel group, and White was suddenly contracted to a company with a wider range of hotels.

In addition to the new location, new touches were made to the service. If a female diner had a handbag, a small side table was placed beside her so that she did not need to place the bag on the floor. Money was not reused; change was only given in new notes and previously unused coins. The kitchen staff were expanded further to around 25, with Robert Reid as the head chef under White. The front of house staff were also expanded to six sommeliers, four Maître d'hôtels and two head waiters. In 1998, ownership of the restaurant transferred to MPW Criterion, a holding company created by White which also owned the Titanic restaurant.

Following White's retirement, the Oak Room continued to operate under Reid, albeit with a new menu where the prices were reduced by between a third to a half. The majority of the staff remained with Reid, with Jeff Galvin installed as the new head chef, until he left to run the restaurant L'Escargot in May 2000. MPW Criterion was wound up on 11 September 2001; by which time planning was already underway to close the Oak Room, which took place on 15 February 2002. By this time, there were 15 other kitchen staff, and a further 15 front of house staff. There was some added difficulty for calculating the redundancy packages for the staff since none of them had written contracts, and were only calculated from the period when the restaurant was owned by the MPW Criterion company; this reduced Reid's total service from nine years to four.

== Menu ==
=== Hyde Park Hotel ===
One of the reasons White sought to leave Harveys was that the size of the kitchen was insufficient to allow him to expand the range of techniques in the dishes he served. With the move to The Restaurant, he added dishes with techniques such as confit, braising and en vessie highlighted. The move also saw an expansion to the number of different options served; while Harveys may have had a handful of main courses, this was increased to around 15 or more at The Restaurant. White's concept for the food was simplified versions of classical French cuisine.

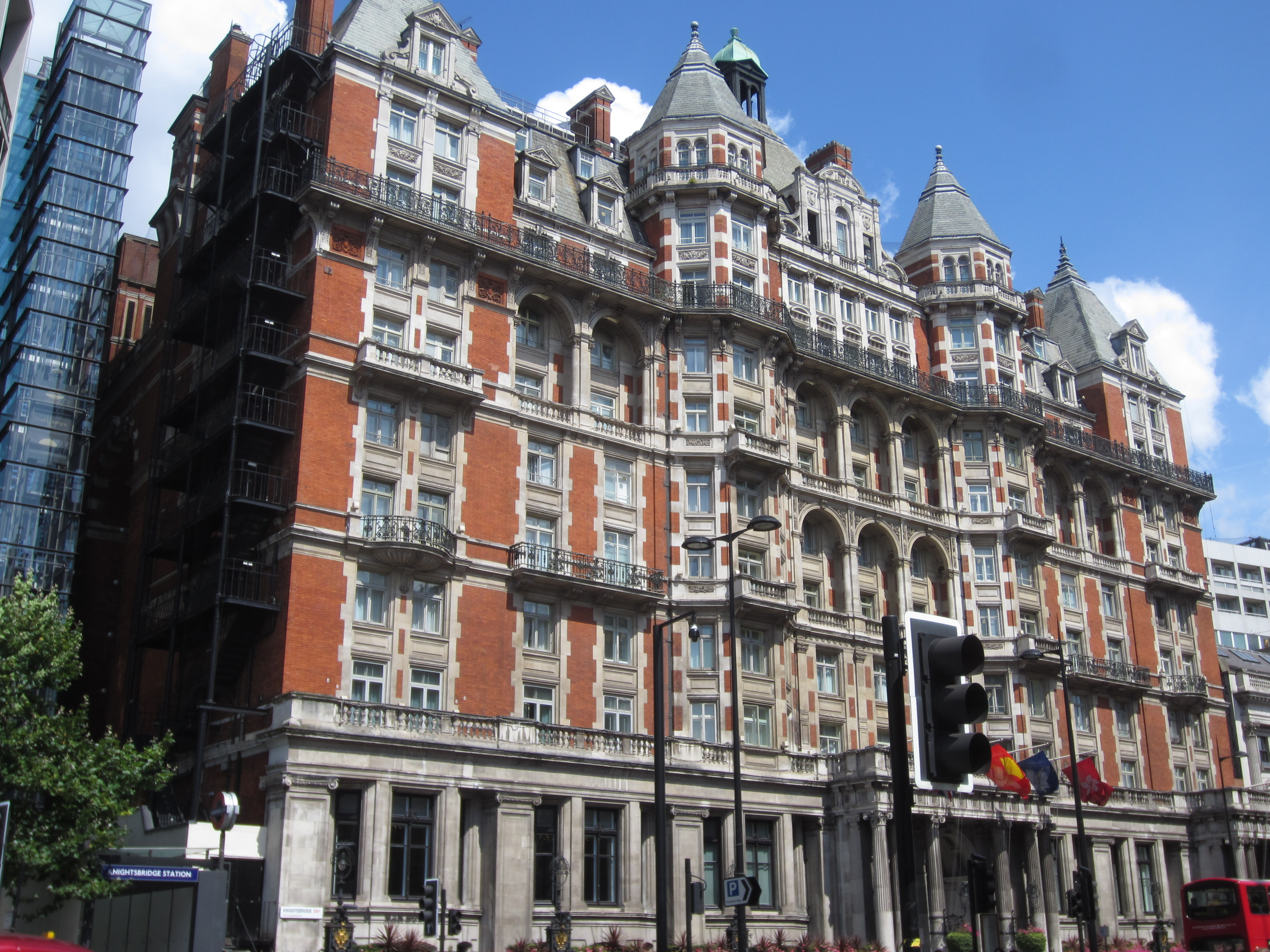
The Hyde Park Hotel, now known as the Mandarin Oriental Hyde Park

White was in the habit of creating new dish concepts late at night, sometimes drawing sketches of the plating directly into the pages of French cookbooks he had picked up during the course of his career, or at other times selecting a protein and writing a long list of potential accompaniments. These concepts would then be handed to his head chef in the morning, who was told to copy them out for future use.

Dishes served included the favourite pigeon, served with foie gras, wrapped in cabbage and served with a potato purée. Another popular dish was lobster grilled and served with truffle butter. White also brought dishes from his previous restaurant as well, including his Koffman inspired pig's trotter, served with sweetbreads and Périgueux sauce (a white wine and truffle sauce). The menu itself was accompanied by a quote from Salvador Dalí, "At six I wanted to be a cook, at seven Napoleon and my ambition has been growing steadily ever since." The dessert menu featured a quote from French gastronome Jean Anthelme Brillat-Savarin, "To know how to eat well, one must first learn how to wait." These quotes were later spoofed on menus in his other restaurants. Another element featured on The Restaurant menus, were the years of the creation of each dish.

The cheese course was served by a Maître d'hôtel on a trolley. White's rules dictated that after lunch, the cheese was reviewed to ensure that a sufficient serving was left to present for the dinner seatings. One incident recounted in White's autobiography, was that upon being unsatisfied with the remaining portions of cheese as the Maître'd was attempting to take the trolley into the dining room for the evening service, the chef threw each cheese in turn against the wall of the kitchen while berating him for not replacing them. Due to the ripeness of the cheese, they remained glued to the wall for the rest of the service.

When a diner ordered potato chips off-menu, White hand cut them himself and charged the surprised diner £25 for the portion. He remarked "For me to cut those chips perfectly took time. They became a cheap portion by the time you calculate my hourly rate".

=== Le Méridien Piccadilly Hotel ===
Following the move to the Le Méridien Piccadilly Hotel, the menu and wine list were expanded once more. White sought to have a far wider range of wine than at other three Michelin star restaurants; one example given was that while a different restaurant might have four or five bottles of Pétrus, the Oak Room list had more than 70 different vintages. There was a collection of Château d'Yquem listed over five pages going back to 1850. By November 1997, the wine cellar was valued at £1.5 million, with an average weekly taking on wine alone between £25,000 and £30,000. The menu was changed to include more table service, such as meat carvings. The other courses and side dishes were carried from the kitchen on silver platters. The idea that this would provide entertainment for all diners, even if they did not order a course with table service.

Further changes were made to the techniques used. Each morning, 36 chickens were roasted for their juices rather than the meat being used on the menu. Each chicken was pressed in a colander to ensure that all the liquid was expressed. These juices were mixed with those from the roasting trays after they had been deglazed with Madeira wine and then added a small amount of veal stock. The actual roasted chickens ended up being too dry to serve following the process, and so were used for staff lunches or were discarded. These 36 chickens produced enough juice for the sauces to accompany 30 chicken dishes. Similar processes were conducted with lamb shoulders, where they were pressed only for the creation of sauces.

== Reception ==
=== Restaurant critics ===
Michael Winner visited the restaurant a couple of days after opening for The Times while dining with Michael Caine. Winner found that the hotel's entrance to the restaurant was still under refurbishment, and that the service was sub par with items being dropped by their waiter. Once the food began to arrive, his opinion changed immediately with a dish of vichyssoise with oysters and caviar showing that White was "on brilliant form". He called his main course of pot roasted pork accompanied by a cuvée vegetables and potatoes with parsley, "as good a main course as I have ever eaten, and I had the sense to be born to extremely rich parents, who kept me gloriously fed from childhood." He called the desserts "to die for", and stole Caine's dessert to eat in addition to his own. John Lanchester dined there for The Guardian, on the second night following the opening, but complained of the cost of the meal, which at £60 for three courses including cover charge and VAT, he thought made it the most expensive in London. He said that the starter of ravioli of seafood with sauce vierge was "good but not dumbfounding", while the lobster salad suffered from the lobster being slightly chewy. He called both main courses "the business". They were a saddle of rabbit served with a herb risotto, leeks, asparagus and a rosemary jus. The other course was ham wrapped sweetbreads served with braised lettuce and cep confit, which he added were "stupendously good". He referred to the desserts as "red-fruit heaven".

Jonathan Meades ate at The Restaurant for The Times in late 1993, and noted the evolution of some dishes and sauces from White's days at Harveys. These included making the pig's trotter dish more "delicate", and only using the white part of the leeks in a pressed leek and langoustine starter. Meades also noticed that White had "tempered" the sauces served with meat and fish, referring to their previous versions as "assault courses". He praised a new roasted salmon and tapenade dish, calling it "of breathtaking quality", and the work of pastry chef Roger Pizey. Meades later listed The Restaurant as the second best in the country at the end of 1994, placed only behind Phil Vickery, having recently taken over from Gary Rhodes, at the Castle Hotel, Taunton. He gave both restaurants an equal nine stars out of ten. When celebrity chef Keith Floyd listed his five favourite restaurants for The Guardian in September 1994, he included The Restaurant in third place, saying "The food is exquisite. He's a difficult bastard, but I like him. He came through le Gavroche, through Albert Roux, and he's developed on from there. Along with Albert, I think he's one of the finest cooks in the country. Last time, I had a bean and langoustine soup which was sensational, outstanding."

A. A. Gill reviewed the restaurant for The Sunday Times after the move to the Oak Room in late 1997. He summarised his visit by saying that "If you are interested in the pursuit of excellence, then a table at the Oak Room is as high as you can go in this country, and close to as high as you can go in the world." He recommended the starters of red mullet soup, the ballotine of salmon, and the chicken oyster served with a celeriac remoulade. He called his main course "utterly simple and completely perfect"; it consisted of roast partridge with choucroute garnie. He called the interior of the dining room "soft and thick and luxurious", adding that a painting by Mark Gertler and three bronzes by Rembrandt Bugatti were "worth the entrance fee alone".

=== Restaurant guides ===
In the 1994 Michelin Guide for the United Kingdom and Ireland, The Restaurant retained the two stars transferred from Harveys. White also became the first British chef to win stars at two restaurants, with a Michelin star being awarded to his restaurant Canteen under Stephen Terry in addition to The Restaurant. Later that year, The Restaurant was awarded a full three stars in Egon Ronay's Guide to British Eateries.

The following year, The Restaurant was awarded three Michelin stars. White claimed to have become the youngest chef ever to have won a third star, but this was later disputed by Heinz Winkler. The same year, Ladenis also won his third star at fellow Rocco Forte hotel based restaurant Chez Nico. The media response at the time was to criticise White over the fact that despite his restaurant serving French cuisine, White had never travelled to France. White had actually travelled through France on trains, for family holidays in Italy with his mother as a child.

Four months after moving the restaurant to the Oak Room, the listing for the restaurant was updated in the 1998 Michelin Guide to feature five red knives and forks in addition to three Michelin stars, the highest possible rating available in the guide. Following the decision to retire, White gave back his Michelin stars as of 23 December 1999 and asked not to be featured in the guide any more. In doing so, he praised Michelin's faith in him, saying "Even during my wilder years they ignored press reports and simply judged me on my cooking."

A year later, and the Oak Room was named a one Michelin star restaurant under Reid. In response, he said "Of course, I think we deserve two stars but you have to be seen to go from nothing to one to two. I don't think it's politically correct to be given two stars straight away." It retained the single Michelin star in the following edition of the guide, prior to the closure of the restaurant.

=== Legacy ===
The Restaurant was later seen as the start of a movement in London wherein high-end restaurants were moved into hotels. This was followed in 1999 by Koffman moving La Tante Claire from its Royal Hospital Road location into The Berkeley hotel. (Note: The former location of La Tante Claire was taken on by chef Gordon Ramsay, a protege and then rival of White's, where he opened Restaurant Gordon Ramsay. This too won three Michelin stars in 2001.) The Restaurant's location in a hotel was thought at the time to have changed the mantra of not eating in a hotel-based restaurant to one where it was more openly acceptable.

== See also ==
- List of French restaurants
