= Chez Bruce =

Coordinates: 51°26′47″N 0°9′55″W

- Interactive map of Chez Bruce

Restaurant information
- Location: London, United Kingdom

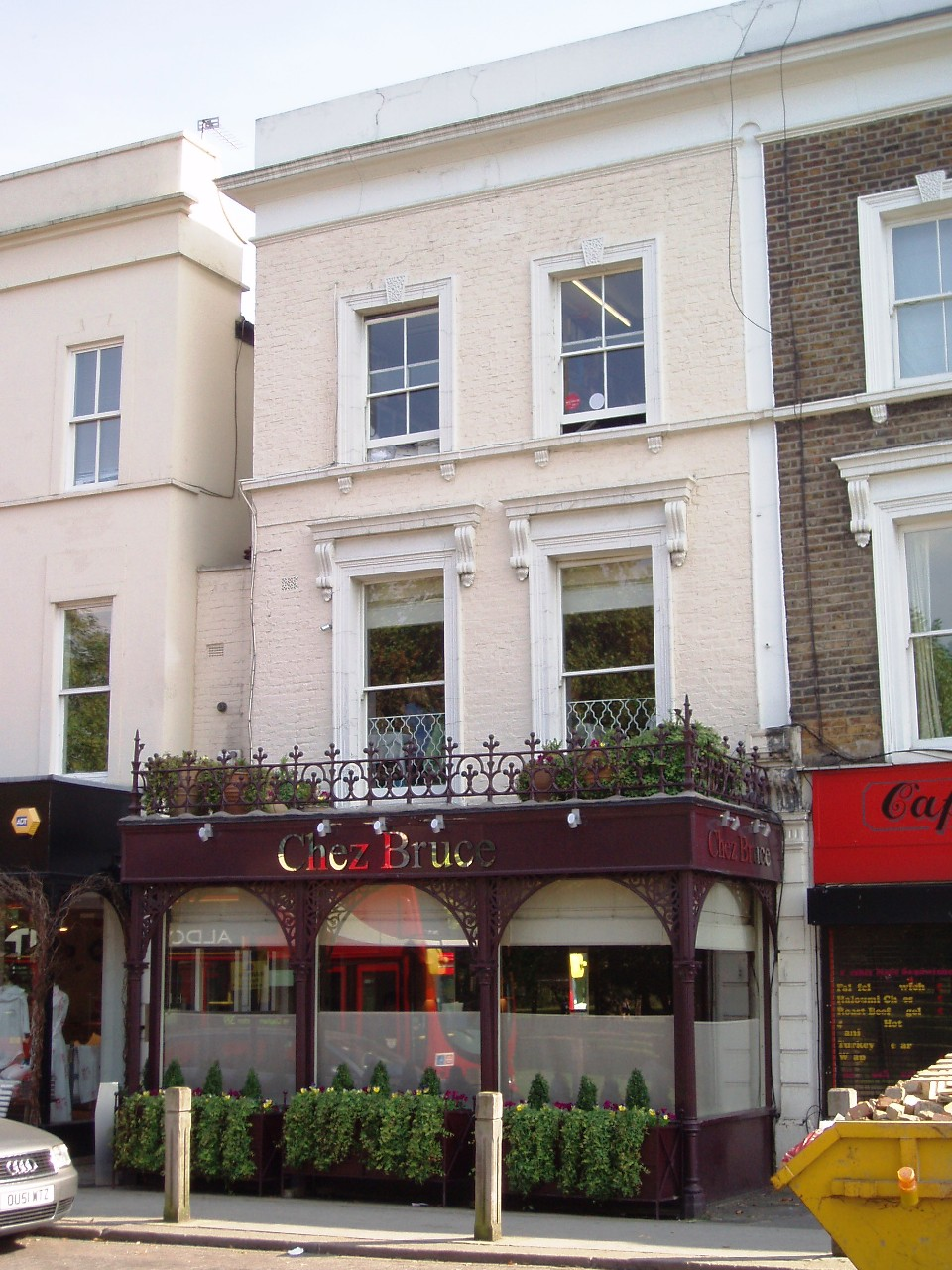
Chez Bruce

Chez Bruce is a restaurant located at 2 Bellevue Road in Wandsworth, London, England.

== History ==
The restaurant was opened in February 1995 by Bruce Poole and his business partner Nigel Platts-Martin, a proprietor of several other Michelin-starred London restaurants, like La Trompette in Chiswick and The Glasshouse in Kew, both of them also co-owned by Poole. Before the opening, Poole previously worked for Bibendum under Simon Hopkinson and then The Square (then-located in St James's), which had been also co-owned by Platts-Martin and its chef patron Phil Howard.

Chez Bruce occupies the site of former Marco Pierre White restaurant, Harveys. It also occupies the site of a nearby former post office since 2009 for building expansion.

The restaurant has held its first Michelin star since late January 1999.

== Menu ==
The restaurant's menu has been seasonal and has featured wines. Poole's cuisine has been French brasserie. Among the dishes served in July 1995 were salt cod fritters with potatoes, fried parsley, and mayonnaise; and soused mackerel with frisee leaves, sliced boiled potatoes and bacon lardons. Among the main courses were sliced roast neck of lamb with spinach, merguez sausages and a timbale of spiced aubergine; and grilled calf's liver with sliced grilled onglet, spinach and diced fried potatoes. Among desserts were sandwich biscuit enclosing raspberries and vanilla ice cream, entitled "sablé of raspberries"; and strawberry granita.

Among the dishes served in August 2019 were cod brandade with sauce nero and warm salad of cuttlefish, courgette and chili; diced (raw) tuna with tamarind-glazed aubergine, soy, sesame and pickled ginger; mackerel rillettes with cured mackerel, elderflower, crème fraîche, cucumber and gooseberries; as a main course, roast cod with olive oil mash, provençale tomato and gremolata; and hot chocolate pudding with praline parfait.

== Reception ==
Gordon Ramsay, who worked under Marco Pierre White at the former site Harveys for three years, praised Chez Bruce in 2005 as one of his favourite restaurants. In July 2016, after disdaining it as "ultra-bourgeois and a little dated" around ten years prior, The Guardian food critic Marina O'Loughlin rated Chez Bruce's food, atmosphere, and money value nine out of ten points each, calling it "an absolute classic".

== Accolades ==
In 2006, Chez Bruce was first named as "Londoners' Favourite Restaurant" in a survey conducted for Harden's London Restaurants, a title which The Ivy had held for the past nine years. Chez Bruce has since been top of the list as London's favorite restaurant for eleven consecutive years as of September 2016.

Out of top 100 British restaurants, The Times ranked Chez Bruce 43rd in 2011 with a score of 9.28 out of ten, 31st in 2012 with a 9.42 score, 40th in 2013 with a 9.44 score, 79th in 2014 with a 9.25 score, and 82nd with a 9.30 score.

== See also ==
- List of French restaurants
