= Aiden Byrne =

English chef (born 1972)

- Born: 1972 (age 53–54); Kirkby, Merseyside, England
- Spouse: Sarah Byrne (m. 2013)
- Children: 3
- Culinary career
- Cooking style: British with Italian tones
- Rating
- Top Notch
- Website: aidenbyrne.co.uk

Aiden Byrne (born 1972) is an English chef, best known as the owner of a number of establishments including The Collingwood, a bar and restaurant in West Kirby.

== Career ==
Byrne is best known for opening The Collingwood pub in West Kirby a number of years ago.

He owned The Church Green in Lymm, Cheshire. He also runs the British Grill in the Macdonald Hotel at Craxton Wood, near Chester.

In 2002, he earned a Michelin star for his cooking in The Commons Restaurant in Dublin, Ireland. Before this position he worked at Roscoff Restaurant under Paul Rankin and Peacock Alley under Conrad Gallagher, formerly head chef of the Grill Room at the Dorchester Hotel in London, but left in January 2009 to run his own pub in Cheshire.

At Adlards in Norwich, by age 22, Byrne was the youngest chef to win a Michelin star. He worked at a number of Michelin-starred establishments. At Danesfield House and Spa, near Marlow, Buckinghamshire, he was Executive Chef of the Oak Room and The Orangery Restaurants. Before this, he spent two years as Head Chef of the Michelin-starred restaurant Tom Aikens. Byrne previously worked with Tom Aikens at the Pied à Terre restaurant as a sous chef. He appeared on the television programme MasterChef in 2008.

His first book, Made in Great Britain, was released in September 2008, along with a video podcast series of the same name based on the book, produced by pod3.tv.

In 2013/14, Byrne opened a new restaurant in the city of Manchester called Manchester House, which cost around £3 million to create. Byrne's journey to opening this restaurant was featured in a three-part series for BBC Two called Restaurant Wars: The Battle for Manchester which was aired on the channel throughout April 2014. The other restaurant featured in the series was The French, opened by Simon Rogan around the same time as ManchesterHouse.

In August 2024, Byrne announced a new venture in the market town of Knutsford.

== Personal life ==
Byrne married his wife Sarah in 2013 in Mauritius. The couple have three children.

=== Charity ===
Each year Byrne elects a charity for his restaurants to support. In 2013, the charity was Brainwave. One event which he held for this charity was gourmet evening which raised £4,380 for this cause. He has previously supported the 'Movember' appeal as well as The Prince's Trust charity.
