= Tom Aikens =

English Michelin-starred chef (born 1970)

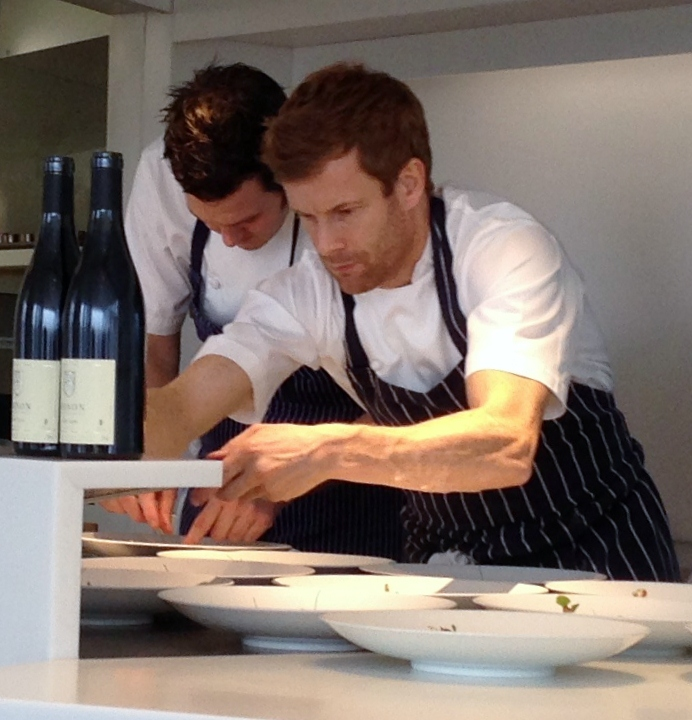
- Aikens in 2012
- Born: 1970 (age 55–56); Norwich, England
- Education: Hotel School at City College Norwich
- Culinary career
- Cooking style: British cuisine
- Ratings
- Michelin stars (2004-2008; 2012-2014; 2021-present) (2008-2011)
- Current restaurant
- Muse by Tom Aikens
- Previous restaurants
- Tom Aikens Restaurant; Tom's Kitchen
- Television shows
- Trouble at the Top; Saturday Kitchen; Iron Chef UK; Great British Menu
- Website: www.tomaikens.co.uk

Tom Aikens (born 1970) is an English Michelin-starred chef. Aikens briefly worked for chefs in London and Paris restaurants. Under his tenure from 1996 to 1999 as head chef and then chef patron, Pied à Terre earned its two Michelin stars in January 1997.

Aikens's current restaurants include Michelin-starred London restaurant Muse, opened in January 2020, and three hotel eateries in Abu Dhabi. He appeared on television, including Great British Menu as one of its contestants and then one of its veteran chef judges.

== Early life and education ==
Tom Aikens was born in Norwich in 1970 to his family who have been wine merchants. His twin brother Robert was born earlier. Tom weighed just over three pounds at birth and was treated in an incubator for two months.

Tom and Robert started attending Hotel School at City College Norwich at age 16. Tom earned a two-year Advanced Catering Diploma in 1989. Robert eventually became a chef also.

== Early cooking career and Pied à Terre ==
Aikens started working at three-Michelin-starred La Tante Claire under Pierre Koffman. Then he worked at Pied à Terre, a London restaurant located at Charlotte Street, as a sous-chef in 1993. Some time later, he worked for Joël Robuchon in Paris.

Aikens returned to Pied à Terre in 1996 and was appointed head chef in May of the same year. Then, under him as its chef patron and co-owner, Pied à Terre earned two Michelin stars in January 1997, branding Aikens the youngest to earn them since Harveys under Marco Pierre White (age 27) in 1990.

On 10 December 1999, a 19-year-old chef Marcus Donaldson was burned with a hot knife, and Aikens was accused of causing the incident. Within a week, Pied à Terre's board of directors advised Aikens to take a break from work during the Christmas period. However, Aikens decided to leave Pied à Terre and establish his own restaurant, which was decided some time prior and unrelated to the incident. Its sous-chef Shane Osborne replaced Aikens. Aikens's then-wife Laura Vanninen resigned as its assistant manager.

After his departure from Pied à Terre, Aikens worked for Pierre Koffman again at La Tante Claire of The Berkeley hotel for nine months and then as a private chef for rich clients like Anthony Bamford in Gloucestershire and Andrew Lloyd Webber.

== First eponymous restaurant ==
In April 2003, Aikens opened Tom Aikens Restaurant (also called Restaurant Tom Aikens), his eponymous restaurant at 43 Elystan Street, Chelsea, a former site of a pub, the Marlborough Arms, with his then-wife and co-owner Laura Vanninen. In January 2004, Aikens's eponymous restaurant received four rosettes from AA plc and then its first Michelin star.

In October 2004, a businesswoman Sarah Roe and her husband Rupert paid £536 (equivalent to £967 in 2025) for the meal after entertaining her clients. As the Roes and her clients were leaving the restaurant, Aikens blocked the doorway and accused her of stealing one of his £16 (equivalent to £29 in 2025) custom-made silver teaspoons. A waiter found the spoon on a nearby table. Aikens still accused Roe, prompting her to boycott Aikens's restaurants. Prior to the incident, nine such spoons had been stolen within at least one month. When the restaurant opened, several £50-ashtrays (equivalent to £90 in 2025) were stolen until non-smoking policy was applied a while later.

The restaurant earned its second Michelin star in January 2008. Then it was closed from July 2011 to 11 January 2012 for refurbishment, causing it to lose its Michelin stars. It was reopened the following day. In late 2012, the restaurant regained its first Michelin star. It permanently closed in late January 2014. Due to closure, it lost its Michelin star in September 2014.

== Tom's Kitchen ==
On 2 November 2006, Aikens opened a newer restaurant Tom's Kitchen, which occupied a former site of a defunct pub The Blenheim, located at Cale Street near Aikens's other eponymous restaurant. In contrast to Aikens's first eponymous restaurant, Tom's Kitchen was not a fine dining restaurant but rather a gastropub. Ollie Couillaud, the previous head chef of Chiswick restaurant La Trompette, co-owned by Nigel Platts-Martin and Bruce Poole, held the role of head chef from the opening to May 2007.

Aikens and his eponymous restaurant group, Tom Aikens Group, opened another iteration at Westferry Circus of Canary Wharf on 29 June 2013 and then the Mailbox Birmingham iteration in December 2016.

Aikens closed the Birmingham and Canary Wharf iterations on 30 May 2019. He closed the Chelsea location on 2 January 2020, citing "extremely challenging market conditions [and] staff and skills shortages". To this date, there have been no iterations remaining.

== Other restaurant groups ==
In October 2008, Aikens's companies T&L Ltd and Tom Aikens Ltd, both of which suffered from £3 million debt, fell into property administration. He sold his two remaining eponymous restaurants to TA Holdco Ltd, owned by Peter Dubens and David Till, leaving his suppliers (many of them small businesses) with unpaid bills.

In March 2011, the Istanbul Doors Restaurant Group bought out Peter Dubens and acquired 80-percent shares of Aikens's restaurants, leaving Aikens with the remaining 20 percent.

== Other eateries ==
Aikens operated a fish-and-chip restaurant, Tom's Place, which only lasted from 6 February to August 2008 due to debt and negative feedback primarily towards the high price. Its head chef was Yves Girard.

Aikens opened a 25-seater fine dining restaurant Muse, located at Belgravia, on 11 January 2020, six years after backing away from the fine dining scene. One year later, in January 2021, Muse earned its first Michelin star.

As of January 2020, Aikens runs three eateries at The Abu Dhabi Edition hotel. As of December 2025, he also runs the other two at The Langham Jakarta: ALICE and Tom's.

== Television ==
Aikens appeared on the long-running cooking show "Great Chefs of the World" in the fourth episode of the fifth season, filmed at his Pied à Terre restaurant. He presented a starter course of roasted scallops with celeriac puree and glazed pork belly. It aired on September 28, 1998.

Aikens and his first eponymous restaurant appeared in the 25 March 2004 episode of a BBC series Trouble at the Top. He also appeared in Saturday Kitchen (first on 18 November 2006) and then Iron Chef UK in late April 2010, competing against Judy Joo, Sanjay Dwivedi, and Martin Blunos.

In the sixth series (2011) of Great British Menu, Aikens lost to Tom Kerridge in the judging round of the London and South East heat. In its eighth series (2013), alongside four other winning chefs (Aiden Byrne, Michael Smith, Daniel Clifford, and Richard Davies), Aikens served his winning dish (Chicken egg, egg chicken) as the starter course of the 2013 Comic Relief banquet at the Royal Albert Hall. He later has reappeared in the series as a veteran chef judge for regional heats. He also competed in the seven-episode 2020 Christmas special of the series.

== Accolades ==
Aikens won the Newcomer of the Year at the 2004 Catey Awards for his newly established eponymous restaurant. He also won the New 5 Rosette Award at the 2007–2008 AA Hospitality Awards in September 2007.

Among top 100 most influential figures of the UK hospitality industry, The Caterer ranked Aikens 71st in 2005, 97th in 2006, 94th in 2010, and 89th in 2011.

Aikens has been awarded up to two Michelin stars for his restaurants. He currently holds one for his restaurant Muse, located in Belgravia.

In 2024 Aikens received the AA Chefs’ Chef of the Year title.

== Personal life ==
Aikens's marriage to his then-business partner Laura Vanninen lasted from 1997 to 2004, one year after they established his first eponymous restaurant. His second marriage to Amber Nuttall, daughter of the late engineer Nicholas Nuttall, lasted from June 2007 to November 2010.

Aikens married his partner of nine years Justine Dobbs-Higginson, a former Goldman Sachs banker, in Corsica in summer 2018. They have two daughters.

== Bibliography ==
- Cooking, 2006 (eBook: ISBN 9781448177196)
- Fish, 2008 (ISBN 9780091924928; eBook: ISBN 9781448146925)
- Easy, 2011 (ISBN 978-0091924935)
- 5 Minute Feast, an Only a Pavement Away charity cookbook, 28 July 2021
