= Justin Bonello =

South African celebrity chef

- Born: 21 June 1971 (age 54); Durban, South Africa
- Education: Cape Peninsula University of Technology
- Culinary career
- Television shows: Cooked; The Ultimate Braai Master
- Website: justinbonello.com

Justin Bonello (born 21 June 1971) is a South African cook, television personality, producer, and writer.

== Early life ==
Bonello was born in Durban and grew up in the Gardens suburb of Cape Town. He also spent some of his childhood on the Breede River and the Wild Coast. He has a sister. He learned to cook through his grandmother, who gave him his first pan, and about filmmaking through his mother Jeanne. He graduated with a degree in Information Systems, Analysis and Design from Cape Peninsula University of Technology.

== Career ==
Bonello's first cooking series Cooked first premiered in 2006 on BBC Food and later BBC Lifestyle. Together with Peter Gird, Bonello co-founded the production company Cooked in Africa Films in 2011, through which he has executive produced and hosted a number of food and travel shows, such as Getaway to Africa, Exploring the Vine, and Around Iceland on Inspiration. In 2012, he created and began hosting the competition The Ultimate Braai Master, which was later acquired by "Okuhle Media" now "Trace Studios". He considered The Ultimate Braai Master a celebration of "who we are as South Africans through food".

In addition, Bonello founded the non-profit organisation Neighbourhood Farm, which aims to create jobs and improve food security by bringing urban farming into communities and schools in Cape Town.

== Personal life ==
Bonello lives in Noordhoek with his wife Eugenie (née Tancred) and their three children.

== Bibliography ==
- Cooked in Africa (2010)
- Cooked: Weekends Away (2011)
- Cooked: Out of the Frying Pan (2011)
- Justin Bonello Cooks... for Friends (2012)
- Cooked in the Karoo (2014)
- Roads Less Travelled (2014)
- Ultimate Braai Master: Road Tripping with Justin Bonello (2015)
