= Tom Aikens Restaurant =

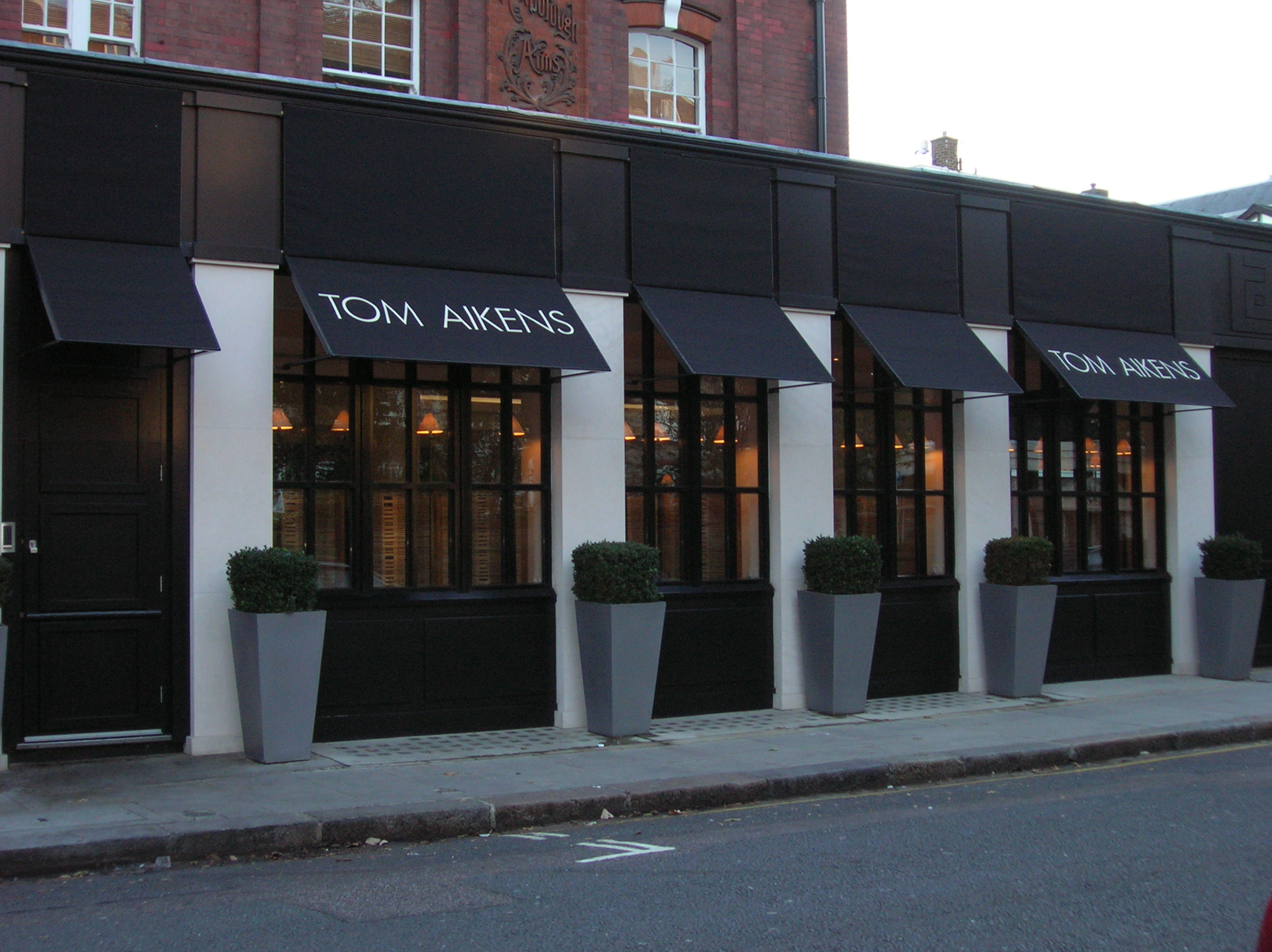
- Interactive map of Tom Aikens Restaurant

Restaurant information
- Established: 2003
- Closed: January 2014
- Previous owners: Tom Aikens (chef patron; 2003–2014)
- Head chef: Aiden Byrne (2003–2005)
- Rating: Michelin stars; (2004–2008; 2012–2014); (2008–2011)
- Location: 43 Elystan Street, Chelsea, London, United Kingdom
- Coordinates: 51.4916°N 0.167727°W
- Seating capacity: 60

Tom Aikens Restaurant, officially titled Tom Aikens, was a London Michelin-starred fine dining restaurant operated by the eponymous chef from April 2003 opening to January 2014 closure. The restaurant received mostly positive critical reception.

== Background ==
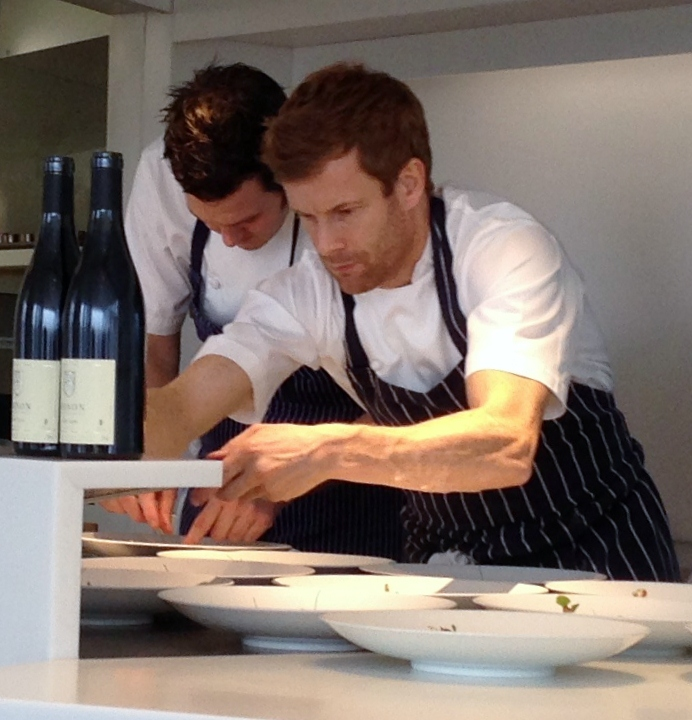
The restaurant's chef patron Tom Aikens (2012)

Tom Aikens, appointed head chef of a London restaurant Pied à Terre in May 1996 and then its chef patron, was involved in a December 1999 incident where a young chef was injured with a hot knife. Aikens left Pied à Terre one week later. Since his departure from Pied à Terre, Aikens worked for Pierre Koffman again at La Tante Claire of The Berkeley hotel for nine months and then as a private chef for rich clients.

== History ==
In April 2003, Aikens opened his 60-seater eponymous restaurant at 43 Elystan Street, Chelsea, SW3, a former site of a pub Marlborough Arms, with his then-wife and co-owner Laura Vanninen. In January 2004, Aikens's eponymous restaurant received four rosettes from AA plc and then its first Michelin star.

In October 2004, a businesswoman Sarah Roe and her husband Rupert paid £536 (equivalent to £967 in 2025) for the meal after entertaining her clients. As the Roes and her clients were leaving the restaurant, Aikens blocked the doorway and accused her of stealing one of his £16 (equivalent to £29 in 2025) custom-made silver teaspoons. A waiter found the spoon on a nearby table. Aikens still accused Roe, prompting her to boycott Aikens's restaurants. Prior to the incident, nine such spoons had been stolen within at least one month. When the restaurant opened, several £50-ashtrays (equivalent to £90 in 2025) were stolen until non-smoking policy was applied a while later.

The restaurant earned its second Michelin star in January 2008.

In October 2008, Aikens's companies T&L Ltd and Tom Aikens Ltd were reported to have debts and then fallen into property administration. He sold this restaurant and his other eponymous restaurant Tom's Kitchen to TA Holdco Ltd, leaving his suppliers (many of them small businesses) with unpaid bills.

In March 2011, the Istanbul Doors Restaurant Group bought out Peter Dubens and acquired 80-percent shares of Aikens's restaurants, leaving Aikens with the remaining 20 percent.

The restaurant was closed from July 2011 to 11 January 2012 for refurbishment, causing it to lose its Michelin stars. It was reopened the following day. It regained its first Michelin star in late 2012. It permanently closed in late January 2014. Since then, it lost its Michelin star in September 2014.

The site was transformed in September 2016 into a newer restaurant Elystan Street, owned by chef Phil Howard and business partner Rebecca Mascarenhas.

== Menu ==
The menu had been seasonal. Among the dishes served in May 2003 were "pig's head with spices and ginger, stuffed trotter and tongue with celeriac puree and crisp pork belly", "foie gras and artichoke terrine with truffled celeriac remoulade" and "poached chicken breast and braised leg with truffled macaroni artichoke sauce". In that same month or December 2003, among the dishes were, noted by columnist Jan Moir, "wild salmon cured with beetroot and orange, served with of beetroot leaves, caviar and dill"; "confit rabbit with carrot and Sauternes jelly and a tarragon salad"; "roast turbot with celeriac fondant"; "pigeon steamed with thyme served with a chestnut veloute", "cannelloni and soft lettuce"; "variations on a [...] duck consomme"; and "snails wrapped in [...] lettuce ravioli."

== Chefs ==
Throughout the run, Aikens had been the chef patron of his eponymous Chelsea restaurant. Aiden Byrne was the head chef from 2003 to 2005 before joining Danesfield House Hotel and Spa (Buckinghamshire) in July 2005. Julien Maisonneuve was the head chef of one of Tom's Kitchen iterations from 2008 to 2011 and then of the eponymous restaurant.

== Reception ==
Food critic Matthew Fort in May 2003 scored the restaurant 18.5 out of twenty, praising "a terrific place" as "comfortable and smart". Fort also noted chef Aikens's emphasis on flavour as "gentler [and] more considered" and on texture as softer than earlier at Pied à Terre. Another critic A. A. Gill in June 2003 rated the restaurant three out of five, praising "good food" as "well cooked but wearyingly [sic] refined and fussy".

The restaurant was awarded the BMW Square Meal Award in autumn 2003 as the Best New Restaurant. Egon Ronay's Guide rated it three stars in early 2005.

Restaurant magazine ranked the restaurant eighth out of top fifty restaurants around the world in April 2005.

The Times critic Giles Coren in June 2003 scored the restaurant 7.56 out of ten, "skill" an eight, "control" a nine, and "atmosphere" a six. He noted feeling "too stuffed for" a dessert course at the end of the course meal but was pleased to be given madeleines. Coren in March 2008 scored the restaurant 7.33 out of ten overall, meat and fish a seven, "cooking" a five, "fidelity to its age" a ten, and "water" a two. Coren noted water served in glasses rather than a jug (or pitcher), praised a scallop dish (seafood course) but criticised an artichoke dish (starter course) as not "tast[ing] interesting enough" and an imbalance of the overall four-course meal especially for Coren's guest who felt "stuffed" after the seafood course.

Out of top 100 British restaurants, The Times ranked the restaurant 58th with the score of 9.09 out of ten in October 2010 and 39th with the 9.44 score in November 2013.
