= The Ultimate Braai Master =

- Genre: Reality
- Created by: Justin Bonello and Peter Gird
- Directed by: Season 8 - Geoffrey Butler
- Country of origin: South Africa
- Original language: English
- No. of seasons: 8

Production
- Executive producers: Peter Gird; Justin Bonello
- Producer: Megan Tinkler
- Cinematography: Sunel Haasbroek
- Editors: Eileen de Klerk; Bernard Bruwer; Eckard Groenewald
- Production companies: Cooked in Africa Films; Okuhle Media; EndPost Studios

Original release
- Network: SABC 3 (seasons 1–3); e.tv (season 4–)
- Release: 13 September 2012 – present

The Ultimate Braai Master is a South African reality cooking competition television series created and hosted by Justin Bonello. The first season premiered on 13 September 2012. The first three seasons aired on SABC 3 before switching to e.tv. As of season 7, the series is also available to stream on Netflix.

The series has won multiple SAFTAs with additional nominations, and 2017 numbers indicated The Ultimate Braai Master was the most popular cooking show in South Africa. Judges have included Bertus Basson, Marthinus Ferreira, Petrus Madutlela, Benny Masekwameng, and Pete Goffe-Wood.

In May 2021, it was announced the series would be returning that September after a break due to COVID-19, having received funding from Nelson Mandela Bay Metropolitan Municipality to film a contained season 7 there.

== Premise ==
Teams of two, consisting of a Braai Master and a Braai Buddy, compete against each other in various braai (barbecue) challenges across 13 episodes in multiple locations. Teams are eliminated along the way and the winning team can win prizes and the title of Ultimate Braai Master.

== Seasons ==
Season	Original run	Judges	Winning team	Braai Master	Braai Buddy
1	13 September – 6 March 2012	Bertus Basson; Marthinus Ferreira	Who Dares, Wins	Laertes Melidonis	Elaine Ensor-Smith
2	18 September – 18 December 2013	Bertus Basson; Marthinus Ferreira	Good Better Brai	Jacques Bester	Nadia Botha
3	11 September – 4 December 2014	Bertus Basson; Petrus Madutlela	Tikka Boys	Mohamed Yusuf Sujee	Stephen Mandes
4	20 September – 13 December 2015	Bertus Basson; Petrus Madutlela	Weskus Anna's	Piet Marais	John Grundlingh
5	5 February – 30 April 2017	Benny Masekwameng; Pete Goffe-Wood	Salty Flames	Chanel Marais	Nick Perfect
6	3 February – 28 April 2018	Benny Masekwameng; Pete Goffe-Wood	The Brafia	Corné "Borries" Bornman	Kagiso "Mr K" Mpinda
7	5 September – 18 December 2021	Benny Masekwameng; Pete Goffe-Wood	Iron Tummies	Yash Singh	Taahir Abader

== Awards and nominations ==
Year	Award	Category	Nominee(s)	Result	Ref.
2014	South African Film and Television Awards	Best Reality Show	The Ultimate Braai Master	Nominated	
2015	South African Film and Television Awards	Best Reality Show	The Ultimate Braai Master	Won	
2016	South African Film and Television Awards	Best Reality Show	The Ultimate Braai Master	Won	
2017	South African Film and Television Awards	Best Reality Show	The Ultimate Braai Master	Nominated	
2019	South African Film and Television Awards	Best Reality Show	The Ultimate Braai Master	Nominated	
2020	South African Film and Television Awards	Best Reality Competition Show	The Ultimate Braai Master	Won	
