= Harveys =

- Former location of Harveys, in Wandsworth

Restaurant information
- Established: 1987
- Closed: August 1993
- Head chef: Marco Pierre White
- Food type: French cuisine
- Rating: Michelin stars
- Location: 2 Bellevue Road, London, SW17 7EG, United Kingdom
- Coordinates: 51.445616°N 0.166041°W

Harveys was a restaurant in Wandsworth, London, run by chef Marco Pierre White between 1987 and 1993. Its French cuisine was warmly received by food critics, and it was named Restaurant of the Year by The Times in 1987.

== History ==
The restaurant opened in January 1987. It was a joint venture between chef Marco Pierre White and restaurateur Nigel Platts-Martin. The two had met while White was head chef at Lampwick's restaurant, and Platts-Martin subsequently purchased Harvey's and placed White in charge of the kitchen. In The Devil in the Kitchen, White recounts that Richard Carr and Platts-Martin had bought a wine bar called Harvey's, which served nothing more than well-cooked burgers to a hungover crowd. After leaving Lampwick's and working a short time elsewhere, Platts-Martin invited White to replace the head chef at Harvey's and a shareholder. White disliked the apostrophe in the name, therefore changed it to Harveys. Platts-Martin later said that "it was in a terrible state but I bought it out of youthful optimism and invited Marco to become head chef. I knew Marco was an extremely talented chef who cooked sensational food but I was very unsure how things would turn out." A year after opening, the restaurant was closed to be renovated. David Collins was the architect, who had previously worked on Pierre Koffman's La Tante Claire.

Several chefs worked at Harveys who went on to be successful elsewhere, including Philip Howard, who won two Michelin stars at The Square, and Gordon Ramsay, who worked at Harveys between 1988 and 1991 and went on to become White's protégé at the restaurant and subsequently own a restaurant empire. White once described the team working at Harveys as "the SAS of kitchens". The restaurant was frequented by celebrities such as Oliver Reed and Koo Stark.

In 1993, White chose to leave Harveys and Platts-Martin purchased White's share of the restaurant. The restaurant closed in August 1993, and was subsequently reopened as "The Bistro", meant to be a sister restaurant to "The Canteen" which White co-owned with actor Michael Caine. It was subsequently relaunched under chef Bruce Poole as Chez Bruce in 1995. White had left because he felt restricted by the size of Harveys and felt that he needed to move to larger premises to win a third Michelin star.

=== Menu ===
White served a menu consisting of French cuisine which included a warmly received dish of tagliatelle and oysters. Other dishes on the menu also included a dish similar to that served at Pierre Koffman's La Tante Claire, a pig's trotter served with morels. Desserts included a lemon tart, and dishes such as "Crackling Pyramide" and soufflés of chocolate served with chocolate sauce. A nougat ice cream dish called "Biscuit Glacé" appeared on the dessert menu at Harveys and also appeared in White's cookbook White Heat.

== Reception ==
Drew Smith, the editor of the Good Food Guide described Harveys as "a meteor hurtling through the restaurant firmament powered by the extraordinary passion of one young man". Jonathan Meades visited the restaurant during 1987 for The Times, describing his meal as "breathtaking". He ate the tagliatelle and oysters main course, and the restaurant was subsequently named the "Newcomer of the Year" in the Times restaurant awards for that year. It was subsequently named the Times Restaurant of the Year in 1988.

White's work at Harveys has subsequently been held in high regard among fellow chefs, and the restaurant is where White became known as a celebrity chef. Within a year of opening, the restaurant won a Michelin star. It subsequently won a second in the 1990 Michelin Guide, making White, at 27, the youngest chef to have held two Michelin stars until Tom Aikens was awarded two stars at age 26 in 1997.
