= Robin Saunders =

American financier and businessperson

- Born: June 8, 1962 (age 63); Greensboro, North Carolina
- Occupation: Financier
- Known for: Founder and managing partner of Clearbrook Capital Partners LLP

Robin Saunders (born June 8, 1962) is an American financier, and the founder and managing partner of Clearbrook Capital Partners LLP, a London-based private equity firm that specialises in property, asset management, speciality finance and infrastructure finance.

== Early life ==
Saunders was born in Greensboro, North Carolina, and grew up in Jacksonville, Florida.

== Career ==
Saunders started her career at Northern Trust in Chicago in 1984 where she specialised in export finance, and from there joined Citigroup. In 1992 Saunders moved to London when she was appointed head of European securitisation at Chemical Bank.

Following a stint at Deutsche Bank, in 1998 Saunders joined German bank West LB as head of its Principal Finance Group and agency Asset Securitisation division. While there, she was instrumental in a string of high-profile deals, including masterminding a bond to refinance Bernie Ecclestone’s Formula One business; funding the redevelopment of London’s Wembley Stadium; the acquisition of stakes in Mid Kent Water, a British water utility company, and Whyte & Mackay, a Scottish whisky company; and providing finance for Philip Green’s purchase of British Home Stores.

As a result of her work, Saunders has served on several UK boards, including Formula One Holdings; Pubmistress Ltd, parent company of Pubmaster group, the owner of approximately 3,200 pubs; the Office of Rail Regulation; Odeon Cinemas; Whyte & Mackay; Mid-Kent Water, Harbourmaster Capital Management; British Home Stores and Saddler's Wells Theatre. Saunders left West LB after parts of BoxClever, a television-rental company that she helped to finance, went into administration, leaving the bank with a €1.7bn loss.

In April 2004, she set up Clearbrook with the backing of high-net-worth investors and financial institutions in Europe and the US.

Investments have included Eclipse Scientific Group, a food safety and testing company. Clearbrook financed a management buyout of Eclipse in 2004 together with an expansion programme which saw the company assemble 11 laboratories in the UK and Ireland before it was sold two years later to larger rival Inspicio.

In 2005, Clearbrook together with RIT Capital Partners took a 49 percent stake in Harbourmaster, a Dublin-based credit manager. The sale of Harbourmaster to GSO Capital Partners, a unit of The Blackstone Group was announced in October 2011 for an undisclosed sum. In January 2013, Robin became Chairman of Hawk Group SA, a pan-European finance company.

== Philanthropy ==
Saunders is an enthusiastic supporter of the arts and education. She is a visiting fellow at The University of Oxford’s Said Business School, The University of Oxford and a Resident Expert/Mentor at the Oxford Foundry. She is a Council Member of the Serpentine Gallery, She is a Governor of the British Film Institute, a Fulbright Commission Board Member, and a Trustee of Rambert Dance Company.

== Personal life ==
Celebrity chef Marco Pierre White became friends with Saunders, leading White's third wife Matilde Conejero to suspect an affair between the two; White and Conejero had a fight in January 2005, after which he spent 14 hours in the cells of Notting Hill police station.
