= Marlon Abela =

Lebanese-British restaurateur, businessman and columnist (born 1975)

- Born: 1975 (age 50–51); Lebanon
- Occupation: Restaurateur
- Spouse: 2
- Children: 4
- Parents: Albert Abela; Barbel Abela

Marlon Abela (born 1975) is a Lebanese-British restaurateur, businessman, and columnist. He is the founder and chairman of the Marlon Abela Restaurant Corporation (MARC), a privately owned international hospitality company based in Mayfair, London. Throughout his career, Abela has owned and managed several Michelin-starred restaurants in London and New York City.

== Early life ==
Marlon Abela was born in Lebanon in 1975. His father, Albert Abela, was the chairman of the Abela Group, a catering business, and a luxury hotelier. His mother, Barbel, is German.

Abela grew up in Grasse, France, and Monaco.

== Career ==
Abela started working for his father's company at the age of seventeen. By 2001, he served as executive vice president of the Abela Group.

In 2001, Abela founded the Marlon Abela Restaurant Corporation (MARC), headquartered in Mayfair. He continues to serve as its chairman. Via the company, he is the owner of Umu and The Greenhouse, two restaurants in Mayfair, London. Both restaurants received two Michelin stars.

In March 2016, Abela bought ownership of The Square restaurant from co-owners, chef patron Phil Howard and wine expert Nigel Platts-Martin for US$4 million. He also became the owner of Morton's Club, a private members club on Berkeley Square in Mayfair. In Manhattan, New York City, he owned another restaurant called A Voce, which closed.

With François Payard, Marlon Abela co-founded François Payard Bakeries, a chain of bakeries, which operated in New York until 2018. In 2014, Marlon Abela acquired the historical wine merchant OW Loeb. In early 2018, a series of delays in payments to suppliers and deliveries to clients triggered a series of hostile press articles. Abela's company said in January 2018, "O.W.Loeb intends to honour its commitments to their clients and is in the process of doing so." The company relocated to the MARC head office in Mayfair with new senior personnel, and said that Abela was "looking forward to implementing new strategies".

Abela is a columnist for Spear's Magazine, where he writes about wine.

Abela was served with a bankruptcy petition by lawyers in October 2019. In 2020 The Square was shut down by administrators during lunch service, Umu went into administration, and Morton's Club also ceased trading. However, Umu is still trading under new ownership.

== Personal life ==
In 2011, Marlon Abela married Nadya Abela, originally from Russia, and they have two children together. Marlon has two more children from his first marriage. Nadya announced on Instagram that she is now separated from him.
