= Phil Howard (chef) =

British chef, chef patron, and restaurateur (born 1966)

- Born: 1966 (age 59–60); Johannesburg, Transvaal, South Africa
- Education: University of Kent
- Spouses: Jennie (m. 1989; div. 1997) (m. 1999)
- Culinary career
- Cooking style: French/British
- Ratings: Michelin stars (1998–2016); (1994–1998; 2017–present); Good Food Guide (8/10) (1999–2016)
- Current restaurant(s): Elystan Street Kitchen W8
- Previous restaurant: The Square
- Website: philiphowardchef.com

Philip Howard (born 1966) is a South African-British chef, chef patron, and restaurateur. He gained cooking skills while working under Marco Pierre White at Harveys and Simon Hopkinson at Bibendum. Howard and White's then-business partner Nigel Platts-Martin opened London restaurant The Square in December 1991, despite both of their inexperience in operating a restaurant at the time.

While operating The Square, which moved from St James's to Mayfair in 1997, Howard had held Michelin stars from 1994 to 2016. He and Platts-Martin sold and left The Square in March 2016. That September, he and another business partner Rebecca Mascarenhas opened Elystan Street, a former site of one of Tom Aikens's eponymous restaurants in Chelsea. Since 2017, one year after its opening, Howard has held one Michelin star for Elystan Street.

Howard owns a few other restaurants and has won accolades from companies such as The Caterer, The AA, and GQ. He appeared in Saturday Kitchen as a guest and Great British Menu as one of its contestants, then one of its veteran chef judges.

== Early life and education ==
Philip Howard was born in Johannesburg, South Africa, in 1966. His father was an accountant and a businessman; his mother was a housewife. At the age of seven, he and his family moved to England. Howard earned a bachelor's degree in microbiology at the University of Kent.

== Early cooking career ==
Howard discovered his passion for cooking during university and then began a cooking career in 1988 after graduating, rather than pursuing a career in microbiology. He worked one summer for a Dordogne chateau. During his brief stint in Australia, Howard was a waiter and cooked and sold food from a 1969 Volkswagen Kombi. After his return to England, he started working under a contract for the catering division of Roux Restaurants Ltd, a restaurant group led by brothers Albert and Michel Roux.

One night, Howard had dinner at Harveys and was impressed by the food made by its chef Marco Pierre White. Then Howard became a chef de partie of Harveys in 1989, where Howard learned to appreciate modernised French cooking. After working at Harveys for nine months, Howard was sacked by White for boiling White's "then-famous creamed potato" (pomme purée).

Shortly afterwards, he worked at Bibendum as chef de partie under Simon Hopkinson, from where Howard was inspired by the emphasis on the quality and flavour of the cooking and its simplicity. While working at Bibendum, Howard and White had stayed in touch with each other. White frequently invited Howard to Harveys to test out White's new dishes.

== The Square (1991–2016) ==
In 1990, Howard was rehired by Marco Pierre White to work at Harveys, he would then be trained as a future head chef for White and White's then-business partner Nigel Platts-Martin's upcoming restaurant. Nigel Platts-Martin and White's partnership of the restaurant project ended. Howard and his business partner Platts-Martin, both inexperienced in operating a restaurant at the time, and without White, opened what became the fine dining restaurant The Square at King Street, St James's on 13 December 1991. With Howard appointed as head chef and his emphasis on simple yet elegant and contemporary French cuisine, The Square earned its first Michelin star in December 1994. Howard had also been the restaurant's co-owner (alongside Platts-Martin) and chef patron throughout most of his tenure.

The Square moved to Mayfair in February 1997 and then earned its second Michelin star in January 1998. The Square also earned four Rosettes by AA plc from 2007 to 2016 and eight out of ten by the Good Food Guide from 1999 to 2016. Howard and Platts-Martin sold The Square in March 2016 to Marlon Abela's eponymous restaurant group, Marlon Abela Restaurant Corporation (MARC), for US$4 million. In late January 2020, after years of MARC's financial issues and mismanagement, property administrators abruptly closed The Square during lunch service.

Howard wrote two volumes of The Square: The Cookbook: first volume Savoury released in 2012; second Sweet in 2013.

== Other restaurants and services ==
Howard opened Michelin-starred restaurant The Ledbury as its co-owner alongside The Square co-owner Nigel Platts-Martin in July 2005. The Square's former sous chef Brett Graham was appointed head chef and later became chef patron of The Ledbury. Despite ownership, Howard never operated The Ledbury as much as Platts-Martin did. The Ledbury had been indefinitely closed since June 2020, citing social distancing measures amid the ongoing COVID-19 pandemic as impractical for the restaurant. The Ledbury reopened in January 2022.

Howard also co-owns other restaurants that are less formal and "more casual" than the (now closed) Square. He has co-owned Kensington restaurant Kitchen W8 since 28 October 2009, opening it with his other business partner Rebecca Mascarenhas, who owned the site under previous names Abingdon Road and then Bistro Eleven. The Square's former sous-chef Mark Kempson was appointed head chef upon the restauarnt's opening. Kitchen W8 earned its first Michelin star in 2011 and has retained it every year since.

Howard and Mascarenhas have also co-owned Sonny's Kitchen since 2012, later reopened as Church Road in 2019. Sonny's Kitchen was originally Sonny's from 1986 to 2012 under Mascarenhas's sole ownership.

On 27 September 2016, Howard and Mascarenhas opened a new London restaurant Elystan Street, the former site of chef Tom Aikens's eponymous restaurant (out of Aikens's restaurants), located at 43 Elystan Street, Chelsea. In contrast to The Square, Elystan Street is less formal and more casual. The menu is at least 25% vegetarian and less complex than The Square's, and Howard's cooking skills are not as "fiddly, technical" as they had been while operating The Square. Under Howard as its current chef patron, Elystan Street earned its first Michelin star in 2017, which has been retained every year since.

Howard and Mascarenhas also co-owned a London wine-focused restaurant Gezellig from May 2019, when it opened to 31 January 2020, when it closed. The head chef of Gezellig was Graham Long.

Howard also owned and operated another restaurant Union, located at the ski resort Montalbert of La Plagne (France). He also owns a chalet there for family vacations and ski trips, having purchased it for €500,000 in 2006 and spending an additional €900,000 for home transformation. Union opened on 16 December 2017. Martin Cuchet is Howard's business partner for Union. The Union restaurant permanently closed in April 2024.

Howard launched a London-based pasta delivery service Otto on 10 May 2021. The name was changed in 2022 to Notto after a legal dispute with another business also called Otto. He opened a pasta restaurant also called Notto at the Piccadilly road in November 2022 with co-partner Julian Dyer.

== Judging career ==
Howard served as the chairman of the chef judging panel for the 21st annual Young Chef Young Waiter competition (2005). He was also one of judges for the Chef Award of the 2010 Catey Awards, which went to Mark Hix; and for the Restaurateur of the Year (Independent) of the 2016 Catey Awards.

== Television ==
Despite mostly avoiding television appearances, Howard made guest appearances in MasterChef: The Professionals (first in October 2009), Market Kitchen (Good Food), and Saturday Kitchen (first on 3 December 2011). In the seventh series of Great British Menu, alongside three other winning chefs (Colin McGurran, Daniel Clifford, and Simon Rogan), he served his winning dish (Cornish mackerel with oysters, mussels, winkles and samphire) as the fish course of the 2012 Olympians' banquet at the Old Royal Naval College in Greenwich, weeks before the 2012 Summer Olympics. He has also occasionally appeared thereafter in the series as a first round chef judge for various regional heats.

== Accolades ==
Howard won the Chef Award at the 1998 Catey Awards, the Restaurant Chef at the 2005 Craft Guild of Chefs Awards, the Chefs' Chef at the 2008–09 AA Hospitality Awards, the Restaurateur of the Year (Independent) at the 2011 Catey Awards, the Chefs' Chef of the Year at the 2016 National Restaurant Awards, the Best Chef at the 2017 GQ Food & Drink Awards, and the Mentor Chef Award of the 2022 Michelin Great Britain and Ireland special awards.

Howard also earned the Special Award at the 2011 Craft Guild of Chefs Awards and the special Chef's Chef Award at the 2012 National Restaurant Awards. Out of the top 100 most influential people in the UK hospitality industry, The Caterer ranked Howard 78th in 2005, 43rd in 2010, 51st in 2011, 37th in 2012, and 81st in 2018.

On 20 July 2018 at Canterbury Cathedral, the University of Kent gave its alumni, Howard an honorary Doctor of Arts degree for his "inspirational life and outstanding contribution to hospitality and food".

== Personal life ==
Howard was admitted twice to drug rehabilitation in 1995 after a three-year addiction to primarily crack cocaine, which he used to compensate his excessive workload at The Square. Since then, he has remained clean and refrained from drugs and alcohol. He also attended Narcotics Anonymous meetings, exercised, and participated in numerous marathons and triathlons. Nine months after Phil's recovery, his brother Greg died of drug overdose in 1996.

Howard has been married to Jennie from the early 1990s to 1997 and since their remarriage in 1999. They have two children. They have resided in Barnes, London since 1999 or 2000.

== Bibliography ==
- Book reviews at Caterer and Hotelkeeper (now The Caterer)
  - Reflections on Culinary Artistry by Pierre Gagnaire (10 June 2004)
  - The River Cottage Meat Book by Hugh Fearnley-Whittingstall (13 September 2004)
  - Essence: Recipes from Le Champignon Sauvage by David Everitt-Matthias (20 October 2006)
- The Square: The Cookbook (Volume 1: Savoury), 2012 (ISBN 9781906650599)
- The Square: The Cookbook (Volume 2: Sweet), 2013 (ISBN 978-1906650827)
