= EatOut =

EatOut Kenya is a privately held technology company headquartered in Nairobi, Kenya. It offers restaurant discovery, reviews, reservations, event curation, and food-related lifestyle content. The platform primarily serves East Africa and operates as part of Websimba Limited.

== History ==
EatOut Kenya was founded in 2010 by entrepreneur Mikul Shah, inspired by global dining platforms such as OpenTable and Urbanspoon.

In July 2012, the Netherlands-based Africa Media Venture Fund (AMVF) invested approximately US$300,000 (KSh 25 million) into the company, acquiring a 25% stake.

EatOut launched an events division in 2013 and introduced its publishing arm, Yummy Magazine, in 2015. In 2016, the company expanded regionally by acquiring The Pearl Guide Uganda and Eating in Kigali (Rwanda). That same year, EatOut secured a further US$500,000 in equity investment from Nairobi-based fintech firm Craft Silicon to support the development of a loyalty and payments platform.

In 2020, AMVF increased its stake by an additional 7.9%, bringing its total ownership to 32.9% and valuing EatOut at approximately KSh 220 million (US$2 million).

== Services and Reach ==
EatOut operates a digital platform that offers restaurant listings, curated dining guides, online table reservations, and exclusive dining promotions. The platform covers cities across Kenya, including Nairobi, Mombasa, Diani, Naivasha, Nanyuki, and Kisumu, with operations extending into Uganda and Rwanda through its regional acquisitions.

EatOut is the official reseller of the global restaurant reservation platform, **Eat App**, in the Kenyan market.

== Partnerships ==
- In 2012, EatOut partnered with Google-backed Wazi WiFi to promote free internet access at restaurants in Nairobi.
- In 2013, EatOut partnered with Safaricom and Kopo Kopo to promote M-Pesa as a payment method at dining establishments.
- EatOut has worked with Visa, Safaricom, Facebook, and others on promotions, workshops, and co-branded events.

== Awards and recognition ==
- 2017
  - Finalist – Facebook Bots for Messenger Africa & Middle East
  - Selected – Stanford GSB SEED Cohort 2 in East Africa
  - Participant – Visa Fintech Bootcamp
  - Hosted chefs from Noma for One Star House Party in Nairobi
- 2016
  - Mikul Shah listed in Business Daily's Top 40 under 40 Men
  - Featured on CNBC Africa – *Eye on Kenya*
- 2015
  - First African company to present with Facebook at DMEXCO, Cologne
  - Founder appointed to Safaricom Spark Innovation Fund board
- 2014
  - Finalist – Company of the Year at Social Media Awards
- 2013
  - Winner – CIO100 East Africa Award
  - Selected – VC4Africa 2013 Startup Cohort
- 2012
  - Winner – Kenya Tourism Award for Digital Media
  - Recipient – World Bank Tandaa Innovation Grant
- 2011
  - Winner – Samsung Bada Best Mobile Application
  - Finalist – Pivot 25 Mobile Innovation
  - Recognized – Vision 2030 ICT Innovation in Tourism
