= La Trompette (restaurant) =

Coordinates: 51°29′30.8″N 0°15′22″W

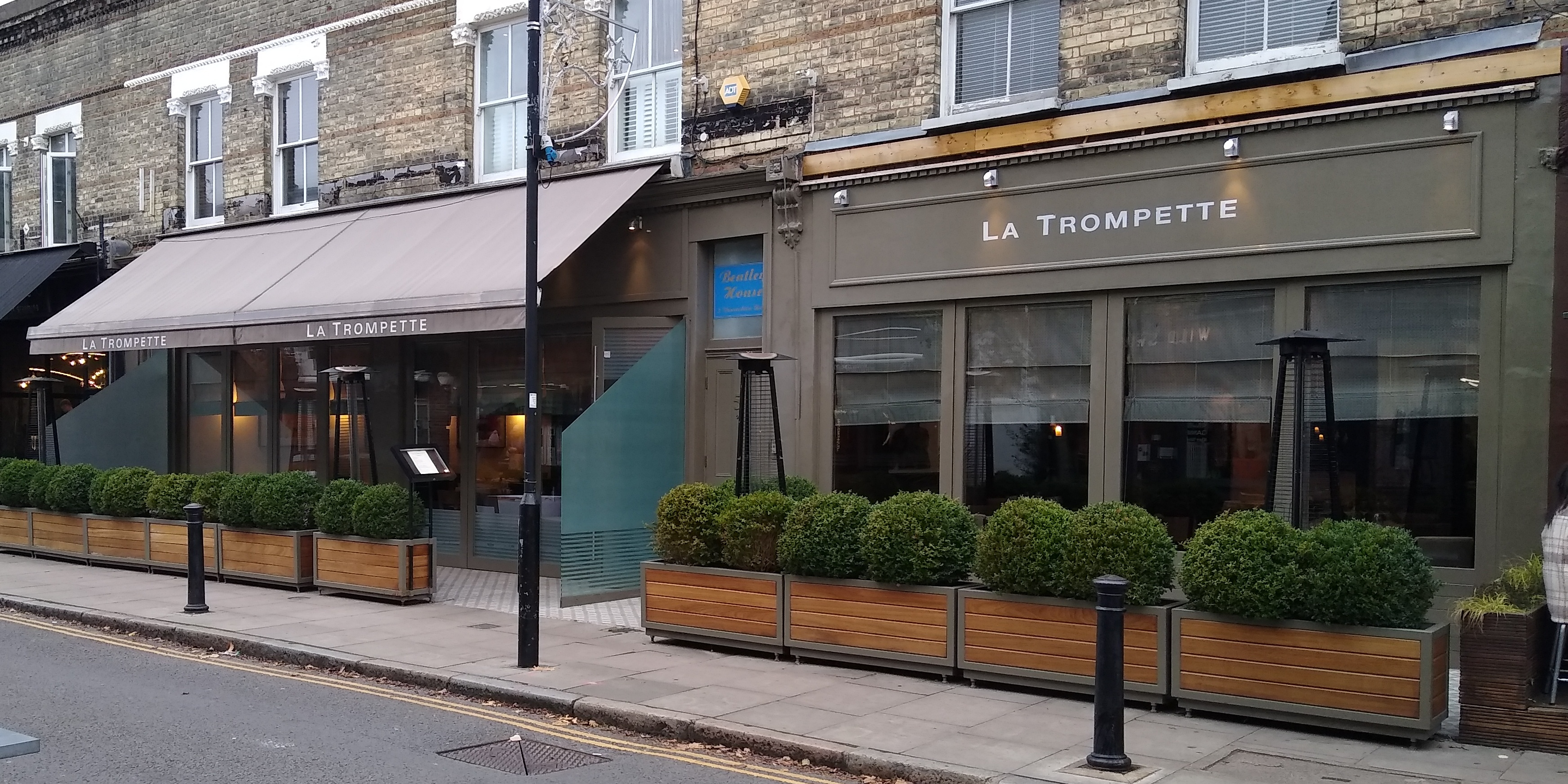

Restaurant information
- Rating: (Michelin Guide)
- Location: Devonshire Road, London, W4, United Kingdom
- Other information: Nearest station: Turnham Green

La Trompette is a restaurant located in Chiswick, London, opened by co-owners Nigel Platts-Martin and Chez Bruce's chef patron Bruce Poole. Since 2008, the restaurant has held one star in the Michelin Guide. La Trompette was awarded a Michelin Star in 2008 under the leadership of James Bennington. The restaurant was closed in January 2013 for wider building expansion. Rob Weston, after sixteen years as the head chef of The Square under chef patron Phil Howard, replaced Anthony Boyd as Head Chef amid reopening in late February 2013.

== See also ==
- List of Michelin starred restaurants
