= Harden's =

Harden's is a UK restaurant guide, publishing print, online and mobile reviews and ratings for both London and UK restaurants. Like New York's Zagat Survey (which no longer has a London edition), the ratings and reviews are based on the results of a reader survey (and were at one point also based on the personal visits of brothers and founders Richard and Peter Harden).

The survey on which the guide is based was also used from 2011 to 2016 to produce The Sunday Times Food List – an annual publication featuring the top 100 restaurants in the UK. Continuing to use the same methodology, the company continues to publish this listing annually under the name Harden's Top 100 UK Restaurants.

The Harden's guide books are published annually in print, online and as an app, and in addition to evaluating individual restaurants, and "Best of", it provides analysis of the restaurant scene and developments over the past year. In recent years, the company has also created a "Harden's Club" with access to promotions and events at restaurants that the company partners with.

== History ==
The London guide was first published in 1991, and based on experiences with restaurant guides in New York City and Düsseldorf.

In 1998, the UK guide was started.
