= White Heat (book) =

1990 cookbook by Marco Pierre White

- First edition cover
- Author: Marco Pierre White
- Illustrator: Bob Carlos Clarke
- Genre: Cookbook
- Published: October 1990 by Mitchell Beazley
- Pages: 126 pp (first edition)
- ISBN: 978-1-84000-343-7
- OCLC: 44540505
- Followed by: Wild Food From Land and Sea (1994)

White Heat is a cookbook by the chef Marco Pierre White, published in 1990. It features black-and-white photographs by Bob Carlos Clarke. It is partially autobiographical, and is considered to be the chef's first memoir. The book is cited today as having influenced the careers of several Michelin starred and celebrity chefs, and was described by one critic as "possibly the most influential recipe book of the last 20 years".

== Description ==
Published in October 1990, White Heat was part autobiography of chef Marco Pierre White and part cookbook, which portrays White's "bad boy" chef image. White was introduced by actress Lowri-Ann Richards to her friend Bob Carlos Clarke. Clarke photographed White for a Levi jeans advert and went on to create the images for White Heat. Speaking following Clarke's death in 2006, Marco Pierre White said, "He was like my prop. Without Bob there would never have been White Heat."

White Heat is credited with changing the image of chefs to sex symbols. The photographs showed White in and out of the workplace, including smoking in the kitchen and working with his team, including a young Gordon Ramsay. One of the photographs featured White with a dead baby shark, which was laid across his lap in Clarke's garden for the shot. Clarke's wife, Lindsay, later said in an interview that Marco went on to gut the shark there and then in the garden, "The stench was unbelievable. I was pregnant at the time and the odour haunted me." Another photograph featured White nude with a side of piglet in his lap. One of Clarke's images of White was included in a set of ten donated to the National Portrait Gallery, London, in 2013.

== Reception ==
John Lanchester, for The Observer magazine supplement Life in 2003, described the book as "gastroporn". Sue Gaisford, reviewing the book for The Independent, described it as a "Marco Pierre White fanzine-with-recipes" and an "ego-trip". In 2005 food critic Jay Rayner called White Heat "possibly the most influential recipe book of the last 20 years".

== Legacy ==
White Heat is credited as being the first chef memoir, and has been cited as influencing the future careers of Michelin starred chefs, including Sat Bains and Tom Kerridge, and celebrity chefs Curtis Stone and Jean-Christophe Novelli.

The New York Times published an article on 13 May 1998 describing White's career, using a passage from White Heat to say that the chef had a "well-publicized bout with drugs and alcohol". It published an apology to the chef regarding this statement later that year on 16 September, describing the passage it had used from the book as "ambiguous". The passage described White going on a drink and drugs "bender", something that White later denied in court during the libel case, saying that he did not proofread his books as he is dyslexic.

White's first appearance on the television show Hell's Kitchen in 2007 caused the price of second-hand copies of his old cookbooks to spike. White Heat had been seen as a collector's item, but after the television show, the price increased to as much as £250 for a signed first edition. In 2008 it was recommended by television chef Michael Symon, writing for Women's Health, despite being out of print in America at the time. Arthur Potts Dawson described it as a "rock'n'roll cookbook" in an interview with The Independent in 2012.
