= Pierre Koffmann =

French professional chef (born 1948)

- Born: 21 August 1948 (age 77); Tarbes, France
- Education: Collège d'Enseignement Technique Reffye, Tarbes (1963–1966)
- Spouse: Annie
- Culinary career
- Cooking style: French cuisine
- Rating: Michelin stars
- Previous restaurant: La Tante Claire; Koffmann's

Pierre Koffmann (born 21 August 1948) is a French chef. In 1983, his London restaurant La Tante Claire became the second in the United Kingdom to be awarded three Michelin stars. Until December 2016, he was the head chef of Koffmann's at The Berkeley hotel in Knightsbridge, London.

== Early life ==
Koffmann was born in Tarbes, France, on 21 August 1948. He is of Alsatian German ancestry from his paternal side. His father worked as a mechanic for Citroën.

He learned how to cook with his maternal grandparents, Camille and Marcel, in Saint-Puy when he visited them during school holidays. Koffmann reminisced about this period in his 1990 book Memories of Gascony, and discussed it in an interview with The Guardian in 2010: "The produce was mostly from the farm. Steak was rare; we ate a lot of poultry. My grandmother did own a cooker, but most of her work was done over an open fire."

In 1963, he left school and applied for a variety of jobs, but ultimately decided to attend cookery school for the next three years.

== Career ==
Koffmann first worked as a chef in Strasbourg and Toulon, before moving in 1970 to the United Kingdom to work with Michel and Albert Roux at Le Gavroche. Koffmann originally only wanted to move to the UK so that he could see England play France at rugby at Twickenham Stadium. He moved to the Roux brothers' Waterside Inn in Bray, Berkshire, in 1972, being made the first head chef of the new restaurant, where he met his future wife Annie who was the restaurant's manager.

He opened his first restaurant, La Tante Claire, in 1977 in Royal Hospital Road, Chelsea. It was awarded its first Michelin star in 1979, its second in 1980, and its third in 1983, just six years after it opened. La Tante Claire moved to The Berkeley hotel in Knightsbridge, London, in 1998, with the former site being sold to become Restaurant Gordon Ramsay.

The signature dish of the restaurant was pig's trotter with chicken mousseline, sweetbreads and morels. Marco Pierre White has called this his "favourite dish of all time".

Following the death of his wife Annie, he closed La Tante Claire in 2003. The space in the Berkeley became the flagship restaurant of Marcus Wareing.

During his time at La Tante Claire, numerous chefs worked for Koffmann who went on to become famous themselves, including Ramsay, Wareing, Marco Pierre White and Tom Kitchin. Wareing did not like Koffmann, and was quoted in Simon Wright's book Tough Cookies, saying of Koffmann: "Three-star kitchen! This guy didn't tell you anything. He didn't tell you what the lunch menu was, he didn't tell you where to get anything … You didn't know if you were coming or going … I could not click with the man." More recently Wareing spoke better of Koffmann, saying "Koffmann is a complete thoroughbred. He ran the kitchen from the stove."

After taking a break from restaurants, he was briefly head chef at the Bleeding Heart pub in Clerkenwell. In 2009, he opened a pop-up restaurant at Selfridges in London for ten days as part of the London food festival. He decided to serve classic dishes from La Tante Claire instead of new dishes as he originally planned – "that's not what people want. They want the pig's trotter, the foie gras, the pistachio soufflé. But maybe I do a new dish each day, as a special." The ten days turned into two months. Koffmann described the first month as "a kind of hell", but he got used to the hours again during the second month, and began to ponder opening a new restaurant: "I started to think about a new restaurant. I thought: why not? I still enjoy it. When you are a chef, your place is in the kitchen."

Koffmann's at The Berkeley hotel opened on 30 June 2010, at the former site of Gordon Ramsay's Boxwood Cafe; it was Koffmann's first full restaurant venture since the closure of La Tante Claire in 2003 at the same hotel. He said he was no longer chasing Michelin stars, and would instead cook the Gascon style food he remembered from his childhood. Koffmann's at The Berkeley closed on 31 December 2016.

Koffmann has a range of potatoes, chips, fruit and vegetables, sold by The Food Heroes, a company set up by Koffman, his wife and her brother. The chips were initially sold to restaurants but the company now markets products to the public.
