= Marco Pierre White =

English chef and restaurateur (born 1961)

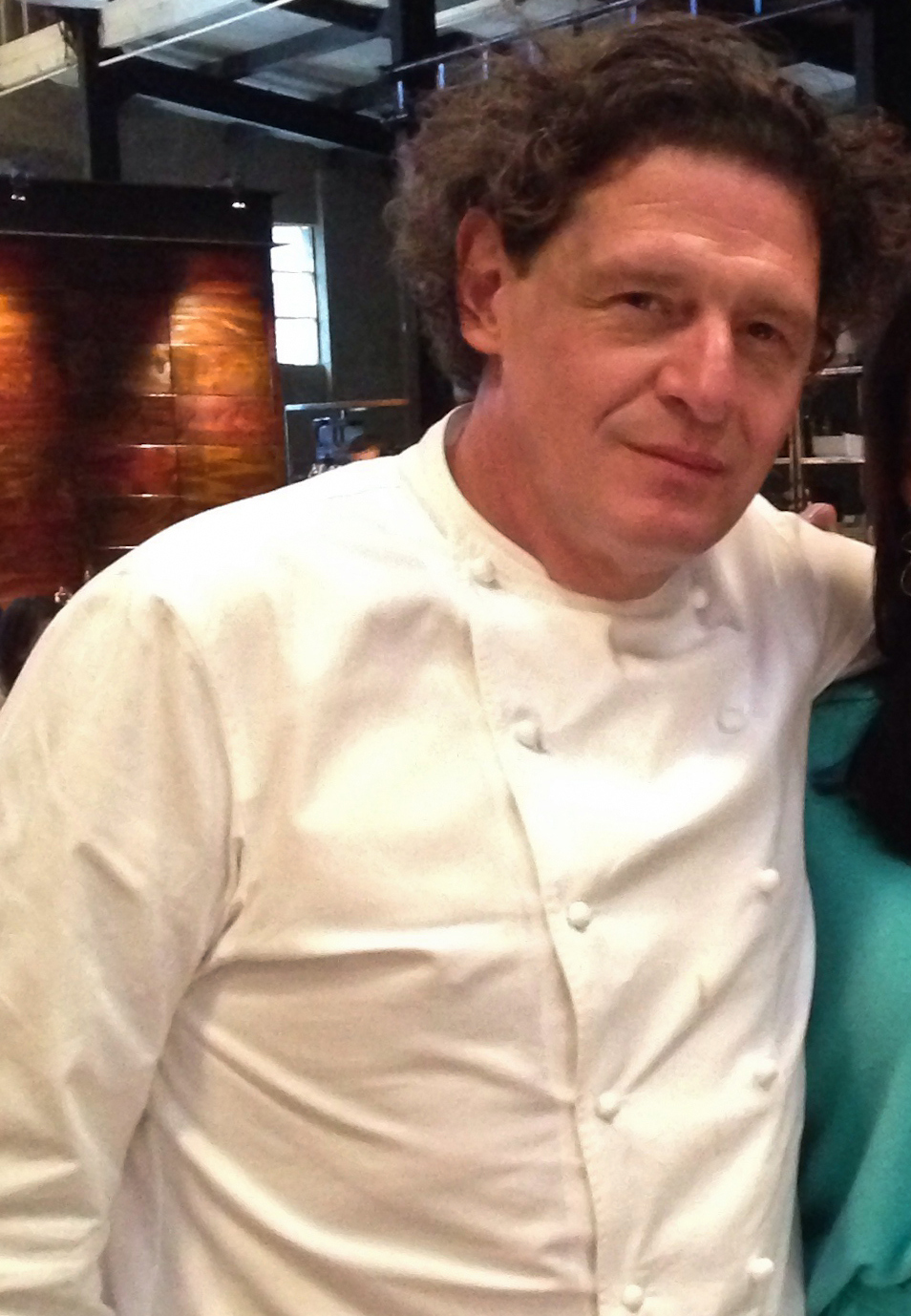
- White in 2012
- Born: 11 December 1961 (age 64); Leeds, England
- Spouses: Alex McArthur (m. 1988; div. 1990) Lisa Butcher (m. 1992; div. 1992) Mati Conejero (m. 2000, separated)
- Children: 4
- Culinary career
- Cooking style: Haute cuisine; French; British; Italian
- Rating
- Michelin stars
- Current restaurants
- London Steakhouse Company; Wheeler's Fish & Chips; Marco Pierre White Steak House & Grill; Wheeler's of St James's; Mr. White's English Chophouse; Koffman & Mr White's; Marco's New York Italian; Marconi Coffee and Juice Bar; Bardolino; The English House
- Previous restaurants
- Harveys; The Restaurant Marco Pierre White; Mirabelle
- Television shows
- Marco; Boiling Point; Hell's Kitchen UK; Marco's Great British Feast; The Chopping Block; Kitchen Burnout; MasterChef Australia: The Professionals; MasterChef Australia; Hell's Kitchen Australia; MasterChef India; The Restaurant
- Website: marcopierrewhite.co

Marco Pierre White (born 11 December 1961) is a British chef, restaurateur and television personality. In 1995, White became the first British chef and, at age 33, the youngest chef to earn three Michelin stars. He has trained chefs including Gordon Ramsay, Mario Batali, Shannon Bennett, Curtis Stone, Phil Howard and Stephen Terry. He has been dubbed "the first celebrity chef" and the enfant terrible of the British restaurant scene.

== Early life ==
Marco Pierre White was born in Leeds, England, on 11 December 1961, the third of four sons to Maria-Rosa Gallina, an Italian immigrant from Veneto, and Frank White, a chef.

Years later, Marco discovered that Frank was not his biological father. His maternal aunt revealed in a letter that Maria-Rosa had been in love with another man, also named Marco, before marrying Frank. The revelation was later supported by DNA testing, which showed that Marco had no English ancestry.

When Marco was six, his mother died from a cerebral haemorrhage caused by complications from the birth of his younger brother. He left Allerton High School in Leeds without any qualifications and decided to train as a chef like his father.

White realised he was dyslexic when his son was diagnosed by his school. He recalled feeling humiliated when other children laughed when he was called on to read aloud in school. White said in 2012 that he "was very fortunate that I entered a world where I didn't have to read or write. I entered a world of cooking where I expressed with my fingers and so that built my confidence. Over the years I've taught myself how to read. I've taught myself how to spell."

== Career ==
White first trained at Hotel St George in Harrogate and then at the Box Tree in Ilkley. In 1981 he moved to London with, he claimed, "£7.36, a box of books, and a bag of clothes", and began his classical training as a commis with Albert and Michel Roux at Le Gavroche. He continued his training under Pierre Koffman at La Tante Claire, moving to work in the kitchen of Raymond Blanc at Le Manoir, and later with Nico Ladenis of Chez Nico at Ninety Park Lane. He then branched out on his own, working in the kitchen at the Six Bells public house in the Kings Road with Mario Batali as an assistant.

In 1987 White opened Harveys in Wandsworth Common, London, where he won his first Michelin star almost immediately, and his second a year later. He also won the Newcomer Award at the 1987 The Catey Awards, run by The Caterer magazine.

White's protégés who worked at Harveys include Gordon Ramsay, Phil Howard, Stephen Terry and Éric Chavot.

He later became chef-patron of The Restaurant Marco Pierre White in the dining room at the former Hyde Park Hotel, where he became the youngest chef to achieve three Michelin stars. He then moved to the Oak Room at the Le Méridien Piccadilly Hotel.

Although White worked for seventeen years to pursue his ambition, he ultimately found that, in spite of his accomplishments, recognition and fame, his career did not provide him with adequate returns in his personal life. As a result, in 1999, he retired and returned his Michelin stars.

I was being judged by people who had less knowledge than me, so what was it truly worth? I gave Michelin inspectors too much respect, and I belittled myself. I had three options: I could be a prisoner of my world and continue to work six days a week, I could live a lie and charge high prices and not be behind the stove or I could give my stars back, spend time with my children and re-invent myself.

== Career change ==
White announced his retirement from the kitchen in 1999, and cooked his final meal for a paying customer on 23 December at the Oak Room. He also returned all his Michelin stars. After his retirement from cooking, he became a restaurateur. Together with Jimmy Lahoud, he set up White Star Line Ltd, which they operated together for several years before ending their partnership in 2007.

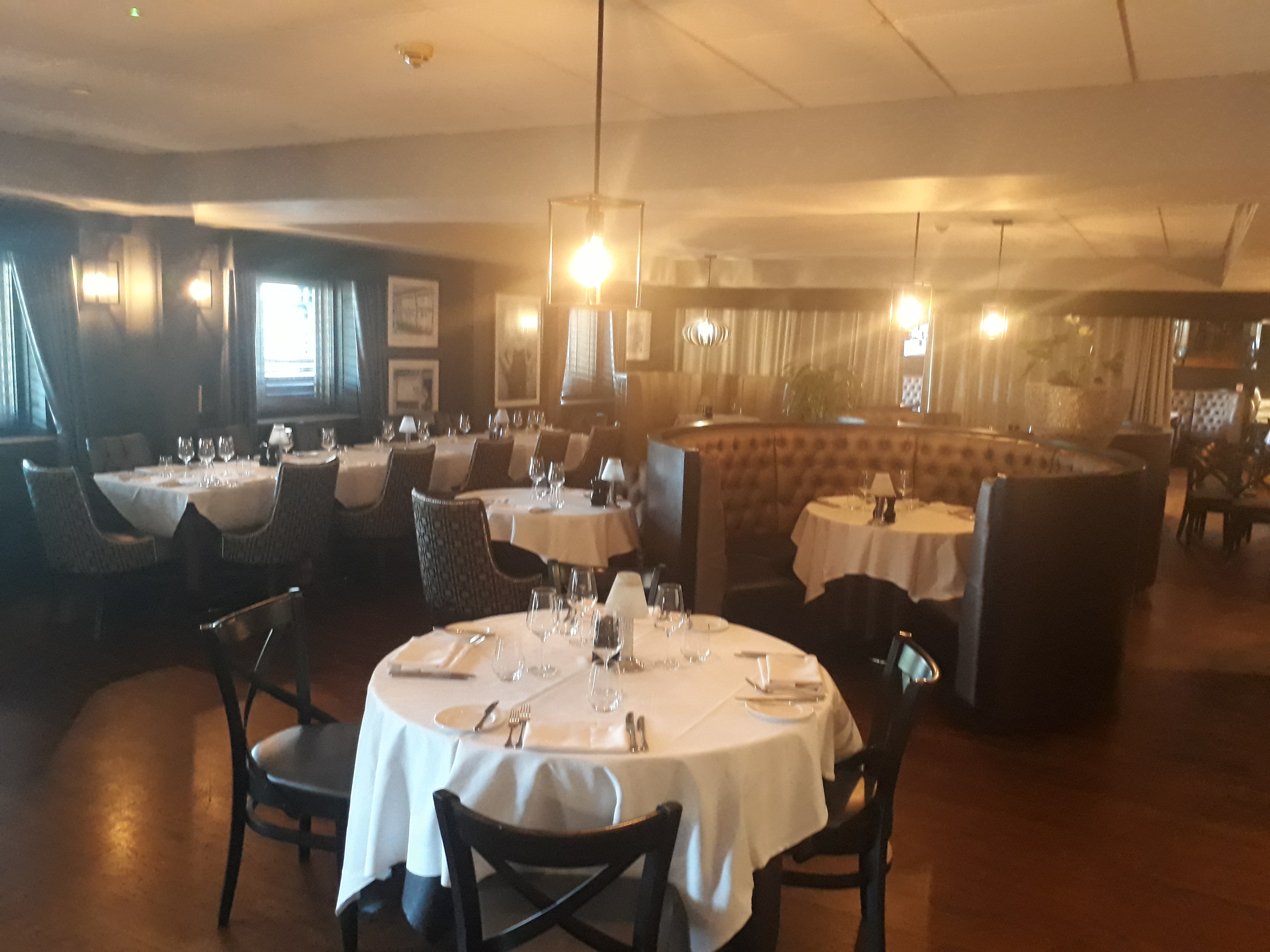
Marco Pierre White Steakhouse, Bar & Grill Bristol

In 2008 White opened his first steakhouse, the "MPW Steak & Alehouse" with James Robertson in the Square Mile in London. As co-owners, since 2010 they also operated the Kings Road Steakhouse & Grill in Chelsea. James Robertson had worked for White as a maître d'hôtel, between 1999 and 2003. In May 2016 the two restaurants became the London Steakhouse Co.

White had a stake in the Yew Tree Inn, a 17th-century dining pub near Highclere in Hampshire, although following an acrimonious falling out with his business partners the pub was sold. This was the setting for much of "Marco's Great British Feast", screened on ITV in the summer of 2008. In January 2009 it was reported that White was to charge £5 for a pint of real ale at the venue, making the Yew Tree "one of the most expensive places to drink British real ale in the country". White said: "Most pubs undercharge. You're not just paying for beer, you're paying for the place you drink it in and the people who serve it."

In 2010 White met the businessman Nick Taplin, the owner of a four-star hotel in North Somerset called Cadbury House and the operator of other venues in Britain. Taplin was looking to improve the in-house restaurant offering across his hotel estate and in October 2010, following discussions with White, Taplin opened a Marco Pierre White Steakhouse Bar & Grill at Cadbury House as a franchisee. This was closely followed by restaurants at Hoole Hall in Chester and The Cube in Birmingham.

As more hotel owners started making enquiries about a Marco Pierre White restaurant, in 2013 White developed a master franchise with Taplin, and together launched Black And White Hospitality. The business operates a franchise model allowing property owners or investors to open one of the eight Marco Pierre White branded restaurants within their property, which comprise Marco Pierre White Steakhouse Bar & Grill, Mr White's English Chophouse, Wheeler's of St James's Oyster Bar & Grill Room, Koffmann & Mr White's, Marco's New York Italian, Wheeler's Fish & Chips, Bardolino Pizzeria Bellini & Espresso Bar and Marconi Coffee & Juice Bar.

White has published several books, including cookbook White Heat, an autobiography titled White Slave (retitled The Devil in the Kitchen in North America and in the paperback version), and the recipe collection Wild Food from Land and Sea.

== Selected works ==
- White, Marco Pierre (1990). White Heat. Pyramid Books. ISBN 9781855100312.
- White, Marco Pierre (1995). Canteen Cuisine. Ebury Press. ISBN 9780091808181.
- White, Marco Pierre (1999). The Mirabelle Cookbook. Ebury Press. ISBN 9780091868338.
- White, Marco Pierre; Steen, James (2007). The Devil in the Kitchen. Orion. p. 309. ISBN 9780752881614.
- White, Marco Pierre (2008). Marco Pierre White in Hell's Kitchen. Ebury Press. ISBN 9780091923167.
- White, Marco Pierre (2010). Marco Made Easy. Weidenfeld & Nicolson. p. 190. ISBN 9780297856511.

== TV and film career ==
=== Hell's Kitchen ===
In September 2007, White was the head chef in ITV's Hell's Kitchen television series.

In one episode, White said, "I don't think it was a pikey's picnic tonight." This was criticised by the Commission for Racial Equality. However, the series was defended by a spokesman for ITV, who indicated that warnings about its content were given before transmission, and that White's comment had been challenged by one of the contestants, Lee Ryan. The book accompanying the show, Marco Pierre White in Hell's Kitchen, was published on 23 August 2007 by Ebury Press.

White returned to ITV's screens to present the 4th series of Hell's Kitchen in 2009.

White presented Hell's Kitchen Australia for the Seven Network which aired in 2017. White had previously been working with the rival programme Masterchef, but quit in retaliation after Matt Preston, a judge on Masterchef, alleged that White's son spent $500,000 of his father's money on drugs and prostitution.

=== Knorr ===
White has appeared in British adverts for Knorr stock cubes and stock pots. In answer to criticisms that he had "sold himself out as a chef" by acting as a brand ambassador for such products he said, "by working with companies like Knorr it allows me to stand onto a bigger stage and enrich people's lives ... Michelin stars, they're my past."

In 2013 White apologised after being accused of cultural appropriation over an online video produced for Knorr in which he demonstrated how to cook rice and peas.

=== Other TV work ===
In 2008 White hosted an American version of the Australian cooking competition series The Chopping Block. The series, produced by Granada America, the production company behind the American version of Hell's Kitchen, aired on NBC in March 2009 but was pulled after three episodes due to low ratings. After a three-month hiatus, Chopping Block returned to complete its season.

On 6 July 2011 White was a guest judge on MasterChef Australia mentoring the cooks in an elimination round. On 15 June 2014 he began a week-long appearance on Masterchef Australia presiding over a mystery box challenge, an invention test and a pressure test. He made further appearances in the series in May and July 2015, and May 2016.

On 27 August 2011 White appeared on the UK version of Celebrity Big Brother to set a cooking task.

In 2012 White fronted a new programme for Channel 5 called Marco Pierre White's Kitchen Wars. It saw the UK's best restaurant partnerships balance food with front-of-house service, fighting for a place in a specially designed studio restaurant, where the top couples are each given their own kitchen and set of diners to impress. It received positive reviews from critics in The Guardian and The Independent.

White was a principal judge in Masterchef Australia: The Professionals, which started on 20 January 2013. White co-hosted the show with the regular Masterchef Australia host Matt Preston.

On 11 December 2014 White appeared on the South African version of Masterchef, which aired on M-Net. He had a cook-along in the final challenge in the finals between Siphokazi and Roxi. On 6 September 2015, White appeared on the New Zealand version of MasterChef, which aired on TV3 (New Zealand). He was the Head Chef/Mentor of a team challenge consisting of the final 8.

In 2024 he partnered with the BBC to make a digital cooking course as part of the BBC Maestro platform.

In October 2026, White launched his YouTube channel, with his first batch of videos being uploaded a month later.

== Controversies ==
=== Treatment of customers and employees ===
During his early career working in the kitchen at Harveys, White regularly ejected patrons from the restaurant if he took offence at their comments. When a customer asked whether he could have chips with his lunch, White hand-cut and personally cooked the chips, but charged the customer £25 for his time.

During his time at Harveys, White would regularly act unpredictably, from throwing cheese plates onto the wall, to assaulting his head chef who had recently broken his leg. He later said that he "used to go fucking insane". A young chef at Harveys who once complained of heat in the kitchen had the back of his chef's jacket and trousers cut open by White with a sharp paring knife. White also once made a young Gordon Ramsay cry while Ramsay worked for him. Commenting on the incident, White said "No, I didn't make Gordon Ramsay cry. He made himself cry. That was his choice to cry." White later wrote, "I don't recall what he'd done wrong but I yelled at him and he lost it. Gordon crouched down in the corner of the kitchen, buried his head in his hands and started sobbing."

=== Matt Preston ===
Following comments made by MasterChef Australia judge Matt Preston about his son Marco Pierre White Jr spending £250,000 of his father's money on drugs and prostitution, White stopped making guest appearances on the show following the 8th series and joined the rival programme Hell's Kitchen Australia in retaliation. In 2016, whilst on The Kyle and Jackie O Show, Preston was asked about Marco Jr.’s time on Big Brother UK, which included his alleged on-air sex and the above admission of purchasing illicit drugs and sex work. Preston said: "I think it is that terrible thing when you have kids that go off the rails... the drugs might be a little bit of a worry". White later said of Preston that "I will never forgive that man [Preston]... with my hand on my mother's grave I will get that man." White eventually returned to the programme in series 14, after Preston had left the show.

=== English wine and West Country food ===
In September 2017, White opened a new restaurant in Plymouth. At the opening, he was critical of the quality of English wine, describing it as "nonsense" and also saying, "London is the No 1 food destination, full stop. It has the talent and (the people who can pay) the prices ... How many three-Michelin-star restaurants does Cornwall have? None."

He went on, however, to praise the efforts of a rival hotel in the city, the Duke of Cornwall Hotel, describing it as "a lovely place". He also added that, while he had not eaten food produced by Nathan Outlaw, a Cornish Michelin-star chef, he had read his books and seen his recipes and believed "he cooks very well".

== Personal life ==
White has been married three times. His first wife was Alex McArthur, whom he married at Chelsea Register Office on 8 June 1988. They had a daughter, Letitia, before divorcing in 1990.

White met model Lisa Butcher at a London nightclub when she was 21, and they were engaged within three weeks. Engaged for two months, Butcher sold the coverage of the wedding in a £20,000 deal with Hello! magazine. The wedding took place at the Brompton Oratory on 15 August 1992.

In 1992 White began an affair with Matilde Conejero, the bar manager at The Canteen in Chelsea Harbour, and divorced Butcher for her. The couple had two sons and a daughter, and were married at the Belvedere restaurant in Holland Park on 7 April 2000. After White became friends with the American financier Robin Saunders, Conejero suspected an affair between the two; they had a fight in January 2005, after which White spent 14 hours in the cells of Notting Hill police station. They separated some time later.

White has been a supporter of the Conservative Party and Manchester City Football Club. In April 2025, White praised Nigel Farage and endorsed Reform UK's West of England mayoral candidate Arron Banks in the 2025 West of England mayoral election.

== See also ==
- Paul Liebrandt
