= The Catey Awards =

UK hospitality industry award ceremony

The Cateys are a UK award ceremony for the hospitality industry, first held in 1984. They have been described as the hospitality industry's equivalent of the Oscars. Recipients are nominated, selected and awarded by the industry through The Caterer magazine.

The Chef Award is one of the most coveted and previous winners include Paul Ainsworth in 2019, Claude Bosi in 2018, Tom Kerridge in 2017, Jason Atherton in 2012, Angela Hartnett in 2009, Heston Blumenthal in 2004, Gordon Ramsay in 2000, Brian Turner in 1997 and Raymond Blanc in 1990.

November 2007 saw the first spin-off event, The Hotel Cateys, which took place at the London Hilton on Park Lane, with Grant Hearn, CEO of Travelodge, taking the inaugural Outstanding Contribution to the Industry Award.

The Foodservice Cateys launched in 2013 at Park Plaza Westminster Bridge.

== Winners ==
=== Chef Award ===
- 2023 Gareth Ward
- 2022 Lisa Goodwin-Allen
- 2021 Andrew Wong
- 2020 Tom Kitchin
- 2019 Paul Ainsworth
- 2018 Claude Bosi
- 2017 Tom Kerridge
- 2016 Clare Smyth
- 2015 Sat Bains
- 2014 Andrew Fairlie
- 2013 Simon Rogan
- 2012 Jason Atherton
- 2011 Brett Graham
- 2010 Mark Hix
- 2009 Angela Hartnett
- 2008 John Campbell
- 2007 David Everitt-Matthias
- 2006 Bruce Poole
- 2005 David Nicholls
- 2004 Heston Blumenthal
- 2003 Marcus Wareing
- 2002 Germain Schwab
- 2001 Michael Caines
- 2000 Gordon Ramsay
- 1999 Rick Stein
- 1998 Phil Howard
- 1997 Brian Turner
- 1996 Willi Elsener
- 1995 John Burton Race
- 1994 Michael Nadell
- 1993 Shaun Hill
- 1992 Bernard Gaume
- 1991 Anton Edelmann
- 1990 Raymond Blanc
- 1989 Pierre Koffmann
- 1988 Nico Ladenis
- 1987 Peter Kromberg
- 1986 Brian Cotterill
- 1985 Anton Mosimann
- 1984 Michel Bourdin

=== International Outstanding Achievement Award ===
- 2023 Jason Atherton
- 2022 Hélène Darroze
- 2021 Pierre Gagnaire and Mourad Mazouz
- 2020 Alain Ducasse
- 2019 Francis Mallman
- 2018 Wolfgang Puck
- 2017 Isador Sharp
- 2016 Rene Redzepi
- 2015 Daniel Boulud
- 2014 Nobu Matsuhisa

=== Newcomer Award ===
- 2025 Sonnet Restaurant, Alnwick
- 2021 Barge East, London
- 2019 Salt, Stratford-upon-Avon
- 2018 Smoke & Salt, London
- 2017 Anglo, London
- 2016 John and Kimberley Calton and James Laffan, the Staith House
- 2015 House of Tides, Newcastle Quayside
- 2014 Red’s True Barbecue
- 2013 Ollie Dabbous
- 2012 Russell Norman and Richard Beatty
- 2011 Castle Terrace, Edinburgh
- 2010 Texture Restaurant, London
- 2009 The Nut Tree Inn, Murcott, Oxfordshire
- 2008 The Kitchin, Edinburgh
- 2007 The Hand & Flowers, Marlow
- 2006 Galvin Bistrot de Luxe, London
- 2005 Simon Rogan
- 2004 Restaurant Tom Aikens
- 2003 The Providores, London
- 2002 Andrew Fairlie at Gleneagles
- 2001 Brownes Brasserie and Townhouse, Dublin
- 2000 Coniston Hall Lodge
- 1999 Club Gascon, London
- 1998 The Star Inn, Harome
- 1997 The Bank, London
- 1996 Hotel du Vin & Bistro, Winchester
- 1995 Gordon Ramsay
- 1994 The Atrium, Edinburgh
- 1993 Morston Hall, Morston
- 1992 Paul Heathcote - MBE
- 1991 Paul and Jeanne Rankin
- 1990 Stuart Scher
- 1989 Nick Wainford
- 1988 David and Tina Thomson
- 1987 Marco Pierre White
- 1985 Rue St Jacques, London
- 1984 Keith and Vanessa Gibbs

=== Menu of the Year ===
- 2022 Bibi, London
- 2019 Inver
- 2018 Xu
- 2017 The Ninth, London
- 2016 The Pointer, Brill, Buckinghamshire
- 2015 OX, Belfast
- 2014 Grain Store, London
- 2013 Sticky Walnut, Cheshire
- 2012 Quo Vadis (restaurant), London
- 2011 The Fox and Grapes, Wimbledon
- 2010 Corrigan's Mayfair
- 2009 The Harwood Arms, Fulham, London
- 2008 Scott's, London
- 2007 L'Atelier de Joël Robuchon
- 2006 The Albion, Clifton Village, Bristol
- 2005 Bohemia, St Helier, Jersey
- 2004 East@West, London
- 2003 Restaurant Sat Bains, Nottingham
- 2002 Bruno's, Dublin
- 2001 The Five Bells, Stanbridge
- 2000 Idaho, London
- 1999 The Glasshouse, Kew
- 1998 The River Station, Bristol
- 1997 The Star Inn, Harome
- 1996 The Canteen, London
- 1995 The Design House, Halifax
- 1994 Number Twenty Four, Wymondham
- 1993 The Box Tree, Ilkley
- 1992 Le Souffle, Hotel InterContinental, London
- 1991 Calcot Manor, Tetbury
- 1990 Le Meridien, London
- 1989 Castle Hotel, Taunton
- 1988 Grand Hotel, Eastbourne
- 1987 Three Swans Hotel, Market Harborough
- 1986 Le Talbooth, Dedham
- 1985 The Savoy, London
- 1984 Waterside Inn, Bray

=== Hotel of the Year – Group ===
- 2019 The Ned
- 2018 Ham Yard Hotel
- 2017 Rosewood London
- 2016 Pennyhill Park Hotel, Bagshot, Surrey
- 2015 The London Edition
- 2014 Midland Hotel, Manchester
- 2013 Hotel 41, London
- 2012 Four Seasons Hotel London at Park Lane, London
- 2011 Belmond Le Manoir aux Quat'Saisons, Great Milton, Oxfordshire
- 2010 Cameron House on Loch Lomond
- 2009 South Lodge, Lower Beeding, West Sussex
- 2008 The Stafford, London
- 2007 Malmaison Oxford
- 2006 The Soho Hotel, London
- 2005 City Inn Westminster
- 2004 Thorpe Park Hotel & Spa, Leeds
- 2003 Claridge's, London
- 2002 Hilton London Metropole
- 2001 Hotel du Vin, Bristol
- 2000 The Berkeley, London
- 1999 Travel Inn, County Hall, London
- 1998 The Savoy, London
- 1997 Malmaison, Edinburgh

=== Hotel of the Year – Independent ===
- 2019 Rudding Park, Harrogate
- 2018 The Torridon, Highlands of Scotland
- 2017 The Beaumont, London
- 2016 Longueville Manor, Jersey
- 2015 Gravetye Manor, West Hoathly, West Sussex
- 2014 The Atlantic Hotel, Jersey
- 2013 The Pig, Brockenhurst, Hampshire
- 2012 Gilpin Hotel & Lake House, Windermere
- 2011 Feversham Arms Hotel & Verbena Spa, Helmsley
- 2010 Lucknam Park, Colerne, Wiltshire
- 2009 The Goring Hotel, London
- 2008 The Isle of Eriska Hotel
- 2007 One Aldwych, London
- 2006 The Chester Grosvenor Hotel and Spa
- 2005 Cotswold House, Chipping Campden
- 2004 Calcot Manor, Tetbury, Gloucestershire
- 2003 The Vineyard Hotel at Stockcross, Berkshire
- 2002 Ynyshir Hall, Machynlleth
- 2001 Celtic Manor Resort, Newport
- 2000 Chewton Glen, New Milton
- 1999 Northcote Hotel, Langho
- 1998 Crieff Hydro, Tayside
- 1997 Gidleigh Park, Chagford

1995 (The Bath Spa hotel) Bath

=== Manager of the Year ===
- 2019 Sally Beck, Royal Lancaster London
- 2018 Laura Sharpe, Ham Yard
- 2017 Andrew Foulkes
- 2016 Chantelle Nicholson
- 2015 David Taylor
- 2014 Peter Avis
- 2013 Fred Sirieix
- 2012 Justin Pinchbeck
- 2011 Philip Newman-Hall
- 2010 David Morgan-Hewitt

=== Lifetime Achievement Award ===
- 2019 Shaun Hill
- 2018 Diego Masciaga
- 2017 Terence Conran
- 2016 Bea Tollman
- 2015 Nico Ladenis
- 2014 William Baxter
- 2013 Silvano Giraldin
- 2012 Dick Turpin
- 2011 Elena Salvoni
- 2010 Roy Ackerman
- 2009 Raymond Blanc
- 2008 Harry Murray
- 2007 Richard Sheppard
- 2004 Anton Mossiman

== Menu ==
Each year, a different top chef collaborates on the menu for the Cateys banquet. These include:

- 2019 Lisa Goodwin-Allen
- 2018 Paul Cunningham
- 2017 The Pig
- 2016 Simon Rogan
- 2015 Mark Sargeant
- 2014 Gary Usher
- 2013 Jason Atherton
- 2012 Tom Kerridge
- 2011 Chris & Jeff Galvin
- 2010 Angela Hartnett
- 2008 Marcus Wareing
