= Brian Turner (chef) =

British chef, based in London (born 1946)

Brian Turner CBE
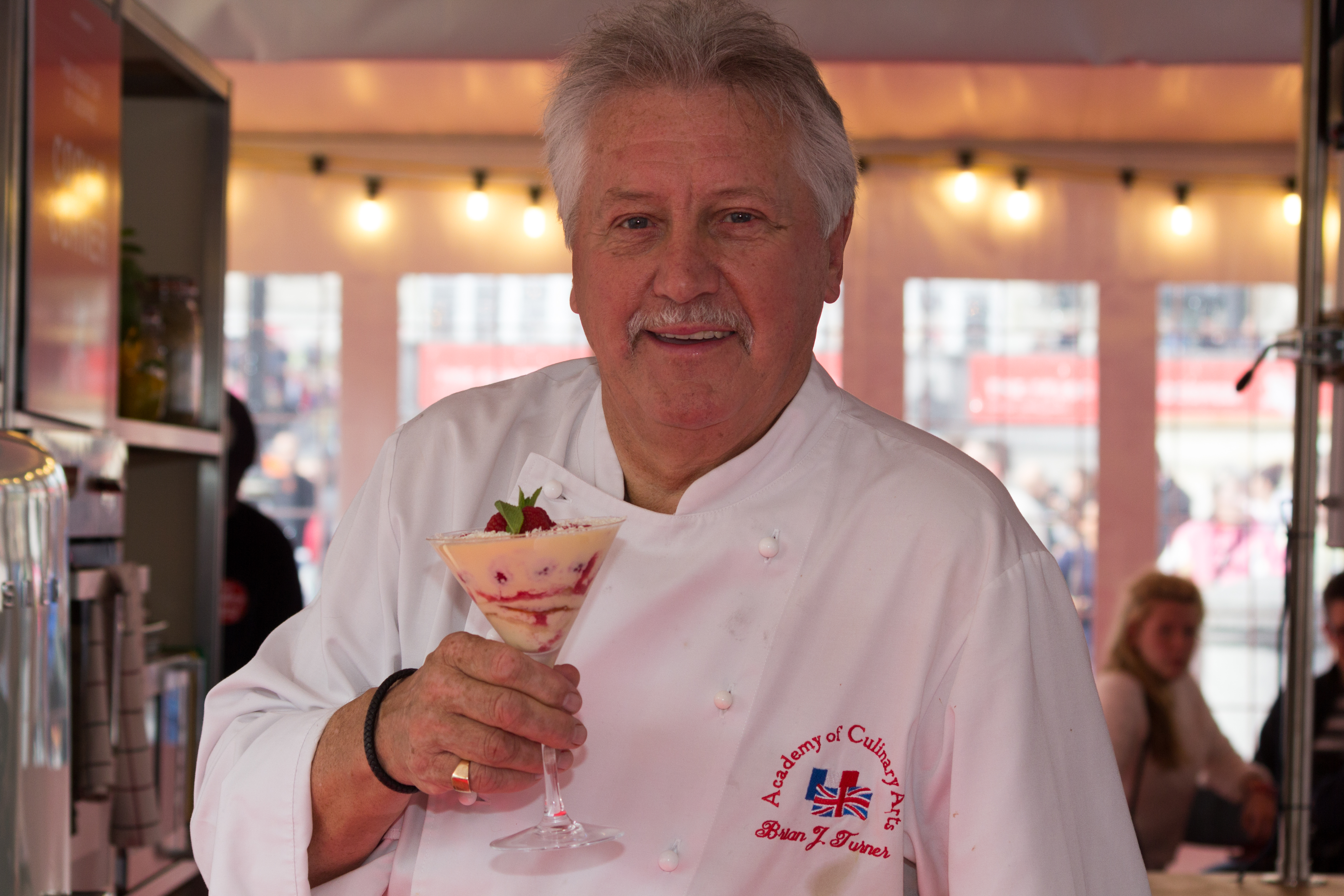
- Turner in 2015
- Born: 7 May 1946 (age 79); Halifax, West Yorkshire, England
- Culinary career
- Television shows: This Morning; Ready Steady Cook; Anything You Can Cook; A Taste Of Britain; Life On A Plate
- Website: www.brianturner.co.uk

Brian James Turner CBE (born 7 May 1946) is a British chef, writer and TV personality based in London. He appeared as a cook on BBC2's Ready Steady Cook from 1994, has appeared on numerous occasions on Saturday Kitchen and has also presented various other cookery programmes.

== Career ==
Turner was born in Halifax, West Riding of Yorkshire. During his early career, his mentor was the food writer and broadcaster Michael Smith. Turner trained at various hotels and restaurants, including Simpson's in the Strand and the Savoy Grill, both under Richard Shepherd. Turner then went to Beau Rivage Palace in Lausanne, returning to Britain to work at Claridge's and then in 1971 the Capital Hotel where Turner and Richard Shepherd earned a Michelin star. In early 1973 he took some time to work as a Chef Lecturer. Turner then took over as Chef de Cuisine in 1975 after Shepherd left, and then launched the Greenhouse Restaurant and the Metro Wine Bar. Among the chefs who worked with Turner at the Capital were Gary Rhodes and Shaun Hill.

In 1986, Turner opened his own restaurant Turner's, in Walton Street, Knightsbridge, London. He ran this until 2001, when it was sold. In February 2002, Brian Turner's Restaurant opened at the Crowne Plaza Hotel in Birmingham's NEC, and in April 2003 he launched Brian Turner Mayfair at the Millennium Hotel, London. January 2005 saw the launch of Turner's Grill at the Copthorne Hotel Slough-Windsor. Brian Turner Mayfair closed at the end of July 2008, to be replaced by an Italian restaurant unconnected to Turner.

In 2003 he invented the Brian Turner - S & C, which is a snack food.

Currently, Turner is working as a consultant chef at a South African wine bar and restaurant called Vivat Bacchus.

=== TV work ===
Turner worked for many years as resident chef on Granada Television's This Morning. He was a regular guest cook on BBC2's Ready Steady Cook which he joined in 1994 as well as presenting other cookery programmes including his own BBC series "Anything You Can Cook". Lately Turner has made appearances on UKTV's Perfect, BBC1's Saturday Kitchen, A Taste Of Britain with Janet Street-Porter (2014), Life On A Plate (2015) and ITV’s James Martin’s Saturday Morning (2021). Turner has also appeared on Daily Cooks Challenge where two cooks prepare different dishes for a celebrity guest. He appeared on Dictionary Corner on Countdown in May 2019. Brian made a return to TV as a guest chef on James Martin’s Saturday morning show on 14 January 2023, when he explained that he had suffered a stroke in June 2022, thanked the London hospital that treated him and asked viewers to excuse him as he now stammers intermittently. On the show, James Martin described Turner as his ‘TV Dad’.

== Awards and honours ==
In 1997, Turner was awarded the Craft Guild of Chef's Special Award for achievement within the industry together with The Caterer Catey Award for 'Chef of the Year' as well as the 'Wedgwood Award' for outstanding services to the hospitality industry.

Turner has been the Chairman of the Academy of Culinary Arts for nine years and is the chairman of the UK Hospitality Skills Board. He has also been awarded an Honorary Professorship of Thames Valley University because of his work and commitment to The London School of Tourism, Hospitality and Leisure and catering education in general.

On 15 June 2002, Turner was created a CBE for his services to tourism and training in the catering industry in the Queen's Birthday Honours.

In 2006, Turner was awarded an Honorary Doctorate from Leeds Metropolitan University for his services to Hospitality & Catering. He is a former alumnus of the Leeds College of Food Technology a predecessor College of Leeds Metropolitan University.

In 2008, Turner was awarded an Honorary Doctorate from Sheffield Hallam University for his services to catering.
