= Travel Weekly =

Travel Weekly may refer to:

- Travel Weekly (United States) an American magazine published by Northstar Travel Group
- a British magazine published by Jacobs Media
