= Pearce & Plenty =

London restaurants

Coordinates: 51°31′37.36″N 0°5′17.18″W

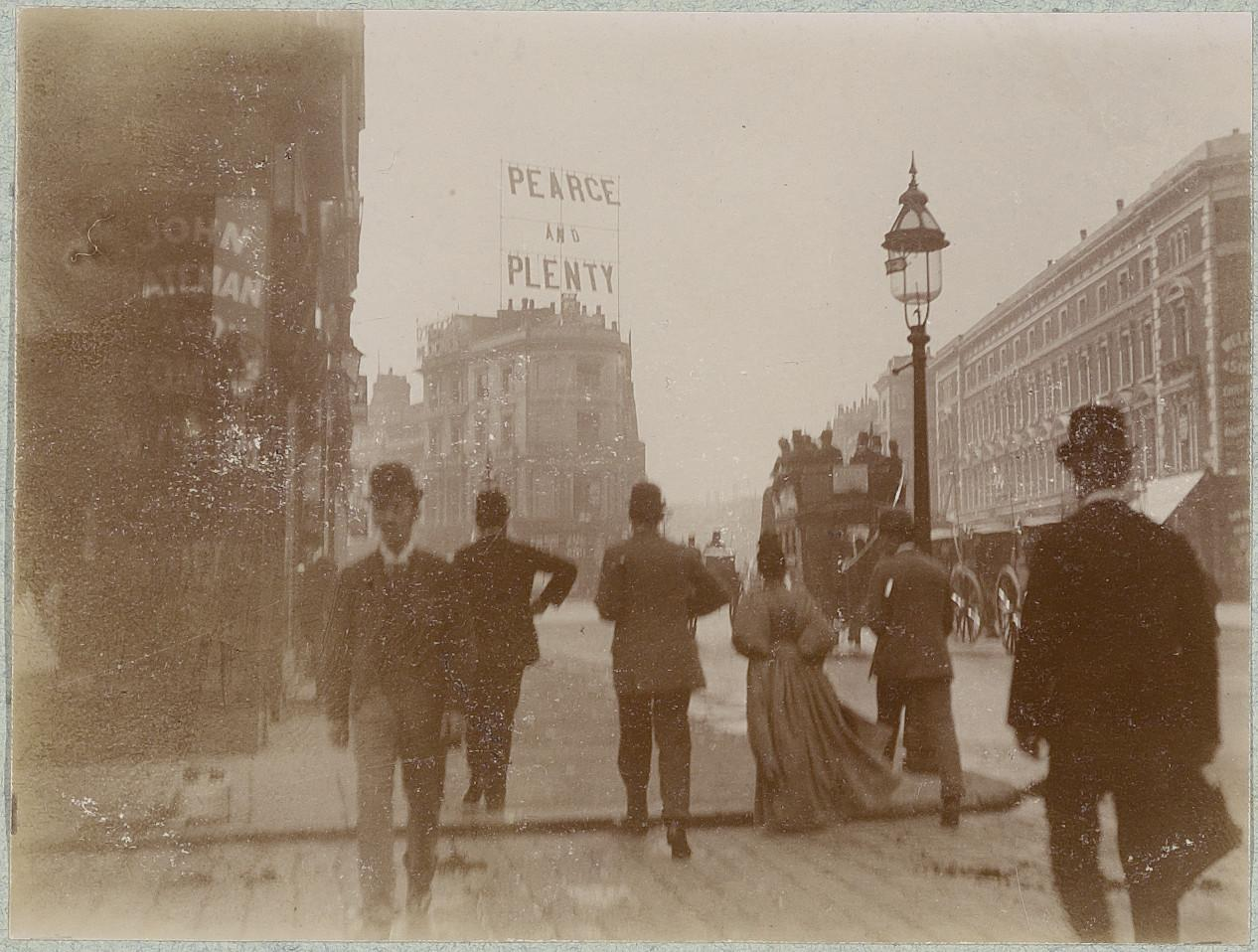
- An advert for Pearce & Plenty on Oxford Street, 1891
- Interactive map of Pearce & Plenty

Restaurant information
- Location: London, England

Pearce & Plenty was a chain of working class restaurants in London, formed in the late 19th century. Its motto was "Quality, Economy, Despatch".

The company was started by John Pearce as a coffee stall on the corner of East Road and City Road, which he operated from 1866 to 1879. He opened a shop in Aldersgate in 1879, moving it to Farringdon Street in 1882, and the company had 46 refreshment rooms by the 1890s. 14 were attached to hotels. According to The Caterer it catered to poor workers with "large appetites but small means", serving an average of 40,000 meals a day. The restaurants served coffee, tea and cocoa. Beef pudding was a popular dish.

Most of the chain's patrons were workmen, the New Penny Magazine describing them as a "shouting, swallowing throng of newsboys, printers' "devils", bricklayers' labourers, carters and sweeps". Pearce went on to create another restaurant chain, "British Tea Table", aimed at city clerks.
