= Chantelle Nicholson =

New Zealand chef

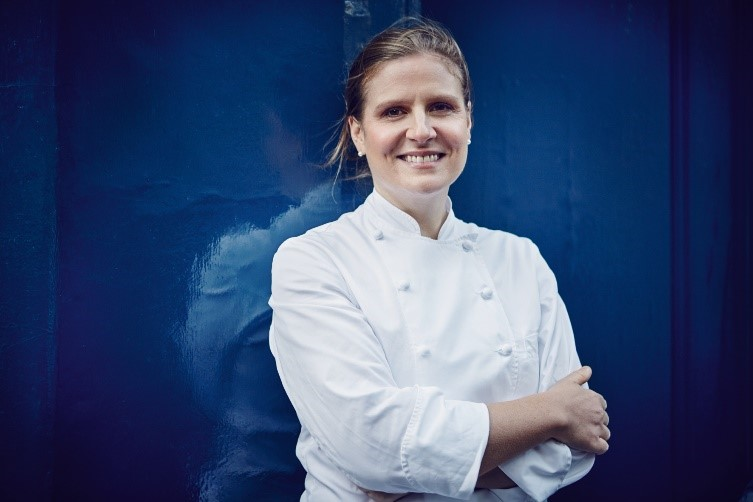
- Nicholson in 2016
- Born: Hamilton, New Zealand
- Education: LLB/BCom from University of Otago
- Culinary career
- Cooking style: Modern European
- Current restaurant: Apricity
- Television show(s): Celebrity Masterchef Chef vs Science Kitchen Garden Live, with the Hairy Bikers
- Award(s) won: The Catey Awards Acorn Award 2009 The Catey Awards Manager of the Year 2016 The Catey Awards Shine Awards Woman of the Year 2016
- Website: www.chantellenicholson.com

Chantelle Nicholson is a New Zealand chef who has resided in London since 2004. Chef owner of Apricity, on Duke Street in Mayfair and All's Well (formerly of Mare St, E8) and former chef owner of Tredwells (recipient of a green Michelin star for its efforts towards sustainability) and former Group Operations Director for Marcus Wareing Restaurants.

In July 2016 Nicholson won Manager of the Year award at the 2016 The Catey Awards. In October 2016 she won Woman of the Year at the inaugural The Caterer Shine Awards.

Nicholson is co-author of Marcus Wareing's cook books The Gilbert Scott book of British food (selected as the Telegraph "Cookbook of the week"), Nutmeg and Custard, Marcus at Home, New Classics and Marcus Everyday. She did dish development and consulting on the 2015 film Burnt. In 2019 Nicholson published Planted: A Chef's Show-Stopping Vegan Recipes, described in Vogue as "the ultimate cookbook for food-obsessed vegans". She is neither vegan nor vegetarian but has said that "The whole reason I did a plant-based recipe book was that I liked the challenge ... When I looked around to find resources for plant-based cooking at a restaurant level, there were hardly any."

== Selected publications ==
- Wareing, Marcus; Nicholson, Chantelle (2009). Nutmeg & Custard. Bantam. ISBN 9780593062111.
- Wareing, Marcus; Nicholson, Chantelle (2013). The Gilbert Scott Book of British Food. Bantam. ISBN 9780593070437.
- Nicholson, Chantelle (2018). Planted: a chef's show-stopping vegan recipes. Kyle Books. ISBN 9780857834485.

== Philanthropy ==
Nicholson's charitable causes include cooking for fundraising dinners for Children of the Mountain, Action Against Hunger, The Felix Project, Street Smart, School Food Matters and The Calthorpe Project. Nicholson is also the Head Judge for the Springboard Charity's FutureChef Competition, encouraging high school students across the UK to explore their culinary skills, embrace cooking as a life skill and kickstart their culinary careers!
