= Jesse Dunford Wood =

English chef and restaurateur (born 1977)

- Born: November 22, 1977 (age 48); Ouro Preto, Brazil
- Education: Leighton Park School
- Occupations: chef; restaurateur
- Relatives: Colin Dunford Wood (grandfather)

Jesse Dunford Wood is an English chef and restaurateur. He is a frequent guest on the BBC programme Celebrity MasterChef, and won Time Out's 2007 Best British Restaurant Award.

== Early life and education ==
Jesse Dunford Wood was born on 22 November 1977 to artist Hugh Dunford Wood and silversmith Emma Stacey in the former residence of Elizabeth Bishop in Ouro Preto, Brazil. His grandfather was the British soldier and RAF officer Colin Dunford Wood.

After attending Leighton Park School in Berkshire, he began his cooking career by training in the kitchen of Scotland's The Witchery by the Castle. From there he moved to a more contemporary Scottish restaurant, the Atrium, run by Andrew and Lisa Radford, which over the years has won numerous awards for its food, modern design and wine list.

Dunford Wood then relocated to the West Country where he studied French cooking at Gidleigh Park Hotel in Devon under Chef Michael Caines, holder of two Michelin stars.

== Career ==
=== Restaurants ===
Moving to Australia, Dunford Wood worked in Sydney's 'Best New Restaurant' VII under Japanese Chef Nori Sugie cooking French-Japanese fusion, and went on to work with Chef/owner Mark Best at Marque.

Back in London in 2003, Dunford Wood spent some time at the Le Gavroche in Mayfair with chef Michel Roux Jr.

Finding an opening at Kensington Place, Dunford Wood spent the first of two spells as sous chef at a restaurant run by Rowley Leigh.

He then moved to the United States with a position at Charlie Trotter's kitchens.

In early 2006, Dunford Wood teamed up with Oliver Peyton to open his restaurants in the National Gallery as Executive Chef. The National Dining Rooms served seasonal modern British food, and it received rave reviews on opening, and went on to win the Time Out Award for 'Best British Restaurant' in September 2007.

=== Proprietor ===
Striking out on his own, Jesse opened Parlour in Kensal Green during 2013 and has featured in the Top 50 Gastropubs every year since.

Parlour has since become a real community hub featuring quizzes, film nights, and themed events throughout the year. During the pandemic the premises were pivoted to become an upmarket grocery store which also provided space to local independent businesses while the kitchen was used to provide hot food for distribution by charities serving the needy.

In 2020 Six Portland Road in Holland Park was added to the portfolio as a smaller and more mature relative. Harvest, in Kensal Rise, was opened in May 2023 as Dunford Wood's third restaurant. Harvest offers seasonal British dishes.

=== Television and events ===
Dunford Wood's TV appearances include the BBC's MasterChef and The Truth About Food. He has been a participant at The Taste of London Food Festival in Regent's Park.
