= Holbeck (disambiguation) =

Holbeck is an inner city area in Leeds, West Yorkshire, England.

Holbeck may also refer to:

- Holbeck, Lincolnshire, England, a hamlet in Ashby Puerorum parish
- Holbeck, Nottinghamshire, England, a village and civil parish
- Holbeck Ghyll, a restaurant located in Windermere, Cumbria, England
- Holbeck Hall Hotel, a clifftop hotel in Scarborough, North Yorkshire, England
- Holbæk, a town in Denmark
- Holbeck TMD, a former railway depot located in Holbeck, Leeds
- Holbeck, a settlement in the municipality of Teltow-Fläming of Germany

== See also ==
- Holbæk, Zealand Region, Denmark.
- Houlbec-Cocherel, Houlbec-près-le-Gros-Theil, Normandy, France.
