= Chris Eden =

British chef

- Born: St Austell, Cornwall, England
- Education: St Austell Catering College
- Culinary career
- Current restaurant(s): Watergate Bay Hotel, Cornwall
- Previous restaurant(s): Gidleigh Park, Devon Driftwood, Cornwall

Chris Eden is a One-Michelin star chef from Cornwall, England. He is currently the Executive Head Chef of the Watergate Bay Hotel, having previously held the same role at Gidleigh Park and Driftwood in Portscatho, both of which attained 1-star ratings from Michelin during his tenure.

== Biography ==
Eden was born in St Austell, Cornwall, and attended St Austell Catering College at age 17. Chris then joined Cornwall's first Michelin-starred restaurant, Pennypots, as a commis chef.

Pennypots Head Chef, Kevin Viner, encouraged Eden to gain some experience at larger city restaurants. Eden moved to London where he held roles at The Lanesborough under Paul Gayler, and The Orrery under Chris Galvin, and The Square under Phil Howard.

In 2007, he returned to Cornwall as Head Chef of Driftwood in Portscatho, where he stayed for 12 years, and in 2012 became the first Cornish chef to gain a Michelin star in Cornwall.

A partnership was formed with Cornwall food company Ginsters in 2017, which saw Eden creating gourmet recipes for savoury pastries which were then sold nationwide. In 2019, the chicken, chorizo, and Cornish gouda pasty created for the partnership won the Gold award at the Taste of the West awards. Selfridges launched a range of exclusive flavours developed by Eden for Ginsters in 2020, including a wagyu beef pasty.

Eden moved to Gidleigh Park in Devon in September 2019, shortly after the restaurant lost its Michelin star, originally gained by Michael Caines. to 2019. The restaurant was where he had taken his now-wife on their first date.

Under Eden, the restaurant regained its Michelin star status in 2023. Eden announced in July 2024 his intention to leave Gidleigh Park, and it was confirmed in September that he would be leaving for the Watergate Bay Hotel in Cornwall.
