= The Stafford =

Hotel in St James's, London

The Stafford London
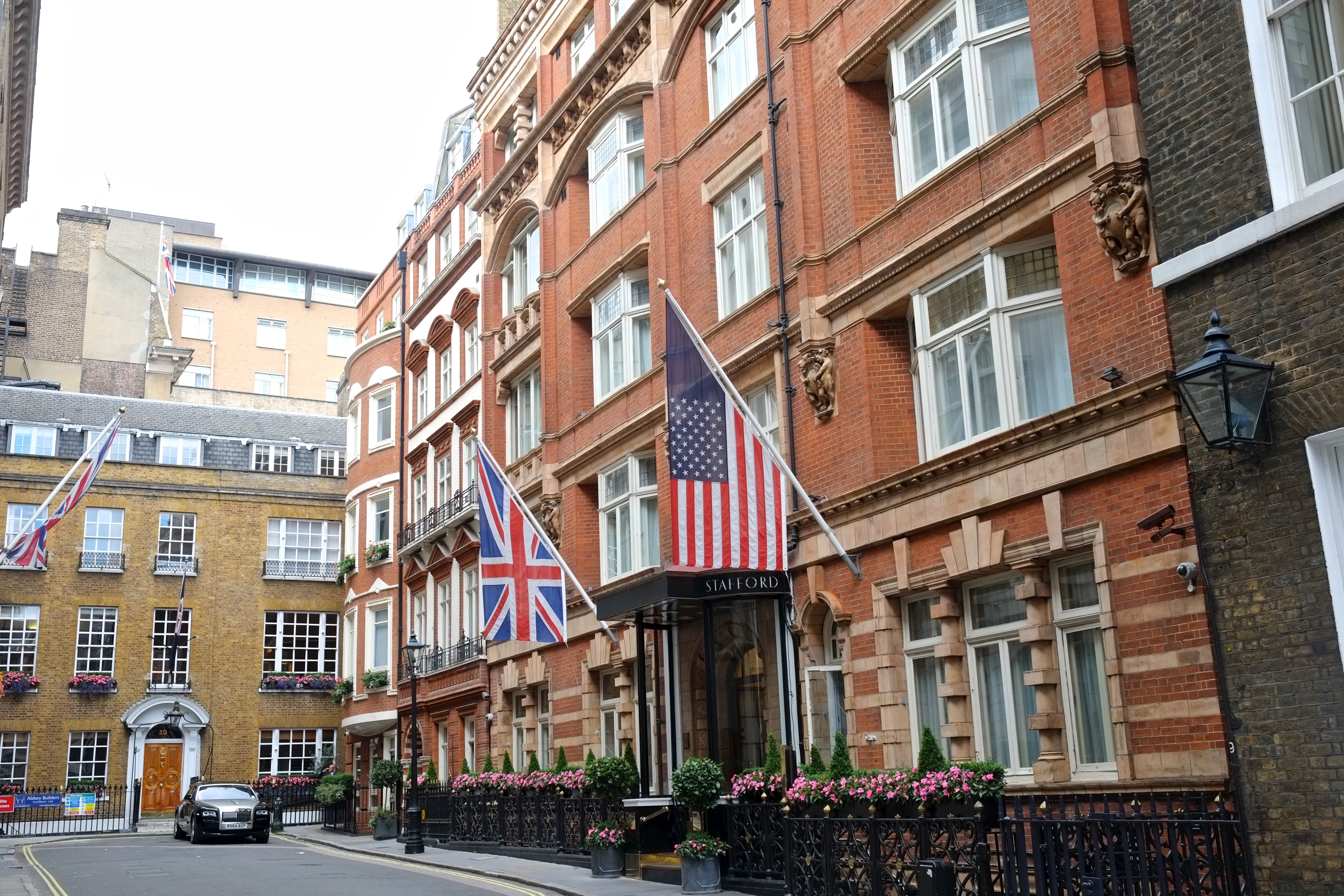

- Location within Central London

General information
- Location: 16-18 St James's Place, St James's, London, England
- Coordinates: 51°30′20.7″N 0°8′25.9″W

Other information
- Number of rooms: 106

Website
- www.thestaffordlondon.com

The Stafford is a five star hotel in St James's Place in London, England. Built in the 17th century, its wine cellars may be the oldest in London. Previously used as private residences, the buildings were opened as a hotel in 1912. Allied soldiers used them as air raid shelters during the Second World War.

Numbers 16-18 St James's Place were built as private residences in the 17th century. With the addition of number 18 in 1912, the block of houses was converted into the Stafford Hotel. Since its founding, the hotel has passed through several ownership groups and undergone a major renovation.

== Private homes ==
Numbers 16, 17, and 18 were all constructed as homes in the 17th century. During this period, Lord Francis Godolphin built an extensive wine cellar under the houses. Reportedly, the wine cellar had doorways that led to St James's Palace.

During the 19th century, number 17 St. James Place was owned by Lord Lyttenton and his wife. In 1849, the family left the house when Lady Lyttelton became a nanny to Queen Victoria’s children.

In the succeeding years, number 17 became the Richmond Club Chambers, Green's Private Hotel and St James's Palace Hotel. In 1886, the Stafford Club moved into number 18.

== Stafford Hotel ==
In 1912, number 16 was added to 17 and 18 to become the Stafford Hotel. At some point, the Madame Prunier wine shipping company moved into the wine cellars.

During the Second World War, the Stafford served as an air raid shelter for American and Canadian officers stationed in London. This led to the formation of the Better 'Ole Club whose membership includes the Prince of Wales. During the war, Simone Prunier, a restaurateur in Paris and London, housed her collection of wine in the cellars for safekeeping. The cellars also served as public bomb shelters.

In 1947 the Costain Company, headed by Sir Richard Costain, purchased the Stafford. In 1985 it was sold to Trafalgar House, to complement their ownership of the Ritz and Cunard Line. Cunard oversaw the development of the Carriage House rooms in the late 1980s and established the Stafford as a favourite with North American visitors.

In 1995, the Stafford was bought by Daniel Thwaites plc, a family-controlled Lancashire based brewery. The hotel underwent a six-month closure for major refurbishment in 1996 and an annual spend of over £1 million on redecorating and replacing fabrics and furniture. In 2007 the ‘all suite’ Stafford Mews building was opened.

In 2009, The Stafford was purchased by Britannia Hospitality Limited and in 2010 it became part of their Kempinski Hotels collection. In 2014 The Stafford redirected its focus, moved away from Kempinski and was accepted into membership of The Preferred Hotel Group.

In 2017 the Carriage House suites were redesigned in collaboration with designer Alexandra Champalimaud. In 2017 The Stafford launched its new restaurant, The Game Bird, with James Durrant as the chef. In 2021, the Game Bird became under the direction of Michelin-starred chef Lisa Goodwin-Allen, Executive Chef of Northcote in Lancashire, and Executive Chef Jozef Rogulski.

Nancy Wake (nicknamed the White Mouse), an intelligence agent for the British during World War II, became a Stafford resident in 2001, and celebrated her 90th birthday at the hotel. In 2003, when she entered a nursing home, the Stafford owners absorbed most of the costs of her hotel stay (parts of her bills were paid by Prince Charles).

In 2020, The Stafford became part of the Stafford Collection, including Norma restaurant in Fitzrovia, London and Northcote hotel in Lancashire.

The hotel's bar is the American Bar.

== Wine cellars ==
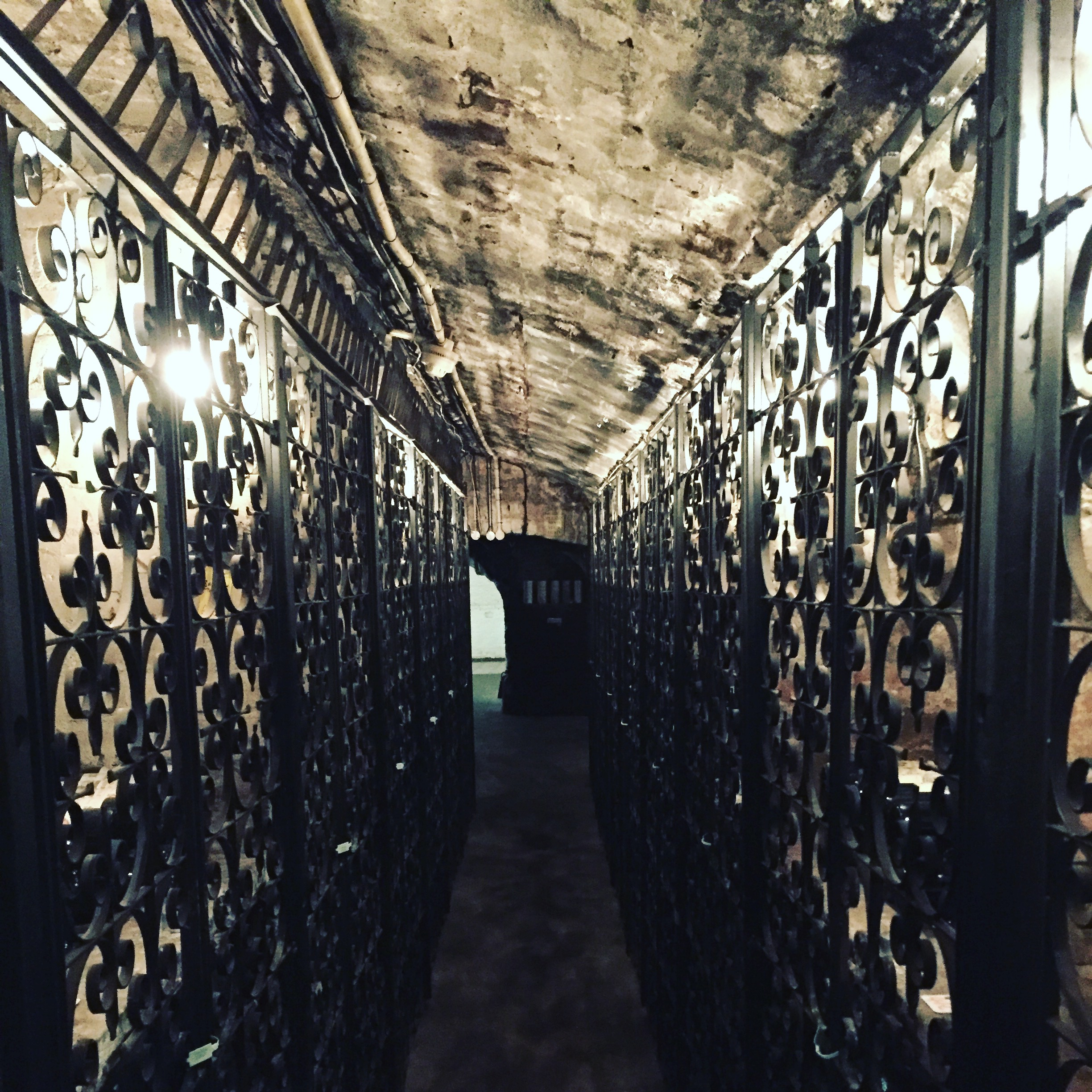
Cellars at the Stafford Hotel

The Stafford wine cellars were built by Francis Godolphin in the 17th century CE. They house over 8000 bottles of wines and Champagnes, including many rare and precious vintages and a selection of Armagnac, port and single malt whiskies, some dating back to the 1920s.

The cellars host an informal museum, with artefacts left by Canadian and American servicemen and women in World War II. The last remaining casket and wine corking machinery are also on show in the main chamber of the cellars.
