= Michael Caines =

English chef (born 1969)

Michael Caines MBE DL
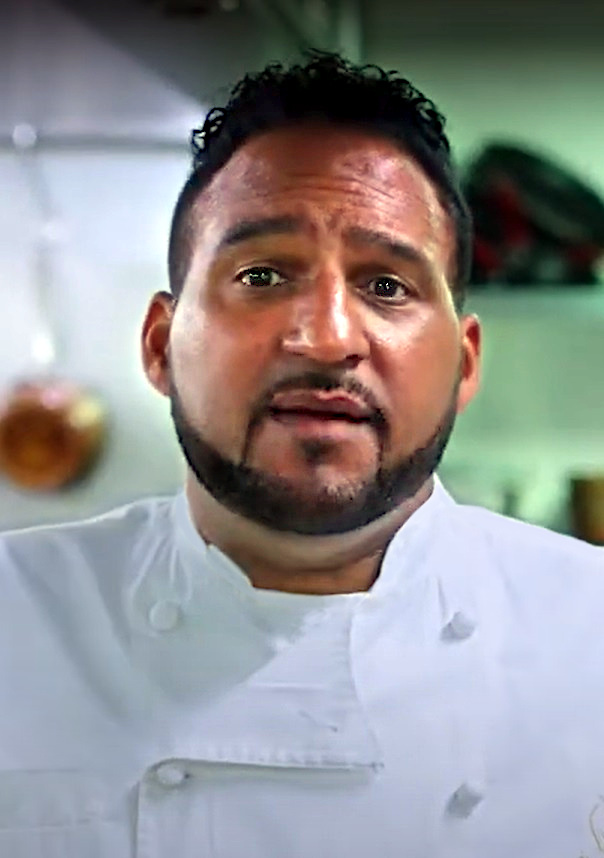
- Caines in 2021
- Born: 3 January 1969 (age 57); Exeter, Devon, England
- Education: Exeter Catering College
- Culinary career
- Current restaurants
- The Coach House by Michael Caines, Kentisbury Grange, Devon, England; Lympstone Manor, Devon, England; Michael Caines at The Stafford, London, England
- Award
- 2002 Chef of the Year at The Catey Awards
- Website: http://www.michaelcaines.com

Michael Andrew Caines MBE DL (born 3 January 1969) is an English chef.

He was head chef of Gidleigh Park in Devon until January 2016. He is currently the chef owner of the Lympstone Manor hotel between Exeter and Exmouth, which holds one Michelin star.

== Early life ==
Caines was born in Exeter in 1969 and was adopted by Patricia and Peter Caines, one of six offspring. He studied catering at Exeter College. From 1987 to 1989 he worked at the Grosvenor House Hotel, Park Lane in London, followed by three years working under his mentor Raymond Blanc at Le Manoir aux Quat' Saisons in Oxfordshire. He then moved to France to study under Bernard Loiseau in Saulieu and Joël Robuchon in Paris.

He became the Head Chef at the one Michelin-starred Gidleigh Park in 1994 but lost his right arm in a car accident soon afterwards. In 1999, Gidleigh Park was awarded a second Michelin star, and in 2001 Caines won Chef of the Year at The Catey Awards. Caines departed Gidleigh Park in January 2016 and was replaced by Michelin-starred chef, Michael Wignall.

Michael Caines Restaurants Ltd was founded in 1999 and the Michael Caines Restaurant opened at the Bristol Marriott Royal in July 2003. However, a meeting with Andrew Brownsword in early 2000 resulted in a partnership and the purchase of the Royal Clarence Hotel, Exeter in October 2000. In 2016 the hotel closed as the result of a devastating fire.

Together they developed the ABode Hotels concept. There are 5 hotels in ABode Hotels: Exeter, Canterbury, Glasgow, Manchester, and Chester. Caines was also executive chef for The Bath Priory from 2009 until 2017, a position now held by Michael Nizzero. He was appointed Director of Food & Beverage for Andrew Brownsword Hotels in 2012, a role he held until July 2014.

Caines became involved in catering for the Williams Formula 1 team in 2013 and, as of the 2017 Grand Prix season, is seen regularly in Williams attire in the paddock.

Caines and John Burton Race represented the Southwest of England in the BBC television series Great British Menu in 2006. Caines beat the Dartmouth based chef to go on to the final round.

Caines launched The Michael Caines Academy in 2011 at Exeter College. In 2015, Caines resigned from Gidleigh Park and ABode Hotels to pursue other business interests.

== Lympstone Manor and Restaurant closures ==
In 2016, Caines opened Lympstone Manor, a luxury boutique hotel and restaurant near Exmouth, Devon, which he describes as "the realisation of a dream, my vision of country house hospitality for the 21st Century". He established a vineyard in the estate to produce a house champagne-method sparkling wine. Since its first harvest in 2020, the Triassic Pinot Noir was produced and has scooped a gold medal at the 2023 International Wine Challenge (IWC) and a bronze at the International Wine and Spirit Competition (IWSC). October 2023 saw the launch of the Champagne-method sparkling wine the Classic Cuvée. Since January, 2025 Caines has been offering private masterclasses in cookery at the hotel.

Caines relaunched The Cove Restaurant, situated in Maenporth near Falmouth in Cornwall, which had been owned and operated by Arty Williams and Annette Rickard for 17 years. The relaunch began on 10 March 2020 and was billed to offer a "relaxed and informal approach to dining that is designed to attract families, locals and holidaymakers alike". However, after less than 2 weeks, on 23 March 2020, the Cove had to temporarily close due to the COVID-19 pandemic lockdown announcement. Caines has since sold the restaurant which re-opened under new management in February, 2025.

In August, 2023 Caines also closed his Porthleven-based restaurant The Harbourside Refuge.

Caines owned and operated Mickeys Beach Bar and Restaurant as well as Cafe Patisserie Glacerie, both in Exmouth, Devon, which have now been taken over under new management.

== Personal life ==
Caines lives near Exeter in mid-Devon. He has three daughters and a son. As an adopted child and amputee, he supports a number of local agencies and amputee initiatives and charities.

== Honours ==
- Caines was appointed Member of the Order of the British Empire (MBE) in the Civil Division on 17 June 2006 in the 2006 Queen's Birthday Honours List. "For services to the Hospitality Industry".
- He was appointed as a Deputy Lieutenant for the County of Devon on 10 May 2019. This gave him the Post Nominal Letters "DL" for Life.
