= John Geoffrey Rowe Orchard =

English chartered accountant and politician

- Coat of arms of the City of Exeter

Municipal posts
- 1937: Sheriff of Exeter
- 1946–1952: Alderman of Exeter
- 1950: Mayor of Exeter
- 1951–1952: Deputy Mayor of Exeter

Personal details
- Born: 1903; Plymouth, England
- Died: 5 January 1952 (aged 48); West Indies
- Political party: Conservative Party (UK)
- Relatives: John Headon Stanbury (grandfather)
- Education: Malvern College
- Occupation: Chartered accountant; politician; golfer
- Awards: Bessborough Trophy

John Geoffrey Rowe Orchard (1903 – 5 January 1952) was an English chartered accountant and Conservative Party politician.

== Early life and education ==
Orchard was born in Plymouth in 1903, the youngest of three children of John Bailey Rowe Orchard (1862–1928) and Amy Cecilia Stanbury (1867–1948), daughter of John Headon Stanbury.

He attended Malvern College, a fee-charging boarding school in Worcestershire.

== Career ==
Orchard served his articles in London with Messrs Nevill, Hovey, Gardner & Co. He was admitted an Associate of the Institute of Chartered Accountants in England and Wales in 1926 and commenced in practice in Exeter later that year. He was principal firstly of Messrs Orchard & Rigby and then of Messrs Orchard & Hamlin until 1940.

Orchard inherited the Royal Clarence Hotel upon the death of his father in 1928. He became the first winner of the Bessborough Trophy in 1931 when it was played at the Palace Hotel, Buxton.

In 1930, Orchard was elected to the Exeter City Council. In 1936, he was captain of the Exeter Golf and Country Club. He was Sheriff of Exeter in 1937. In 1938, he was president of the Exeter Fat Stock and Poultry Show. After service in Malaya with the Royal Observer Corps in World War II, Orchard returned to Exeter and in 1946, was elected an Alderman of the city. He was one of seven directors of Exeter City Football Club in the 1946–47 season. In 1950, he was Provincial Junior Grand Warden of the Provincial Grand Lodge of Devonshire. The same year, he succeeded Godwin Michelmore as Lord Mayor of Exeter. He was Deputy Lord Mayor of Exeter the following year until his death on 5 January 1952 while on cruise in the West Indies.

Orchard was Chairman of the Conservative Party in Exeter.

Civic offices
Preceded by Godwin Michelmore	Mayor of Exeter; 1950	Succeeded by Frederick Peter Cottey
