= Forever Friends (brand) =

Teddy bear-themed brand of Hallmark Cards

Forever Friends is a brand of Hallmark Cards, based on a bear design. The Forever Friends bear can be found in 40 countries and in 15 languages. The bear was designed by artist Deborah Jones.

== History ==
In 1987, artist Deborah Jones drew the first Forever Friends bear in her sketchbook. She approached Bath, Somerset based greeting cards publishers Andrew Brownsword, who agreed to release the bear design as a greeting card. The pair worked in a flat above a Chinese takeaway in Reading, Berkshire in the early 1980s:

I wanted to develop a teddy bear that appealed to adults as well as children. I based Forever Friends specifically on the teddy bear that Sebastian Flyte carried around in Brideshead Revisited. It became the bear found in the attic.

In 1989, the design was registered under the trademark Forever Friends.

In 1994 Andrew Brownsword Ltd was purchased by Hallmark Cards. Brownsword himself agreed to become the CEO of Hallmark Europe, while the new money allowed the whole of card design was updated to include a border.

In 1997 new sub-brand Between Friends was issued, focusing on children's cards. This was followed in 2000 by Blanc, a plain pencil on whitecard design focused on older people. This was also the last design set Deborah Jones worked on, as she retired from what was now Hallmark's Bath design studio.

In 2005, Forever Friends was relaunched with a water colour based look, textured paper on cards and a more modern font. By 2008, the range of cuddly toys had been supplemented by a range of digital downloads.

In 2011, the "Forever Friends Naturals" range was launched by Grace Cole Limited, taking the lovable bears as the face of a cute and cuddly range of natural skincare products for babies and children.

Jones also drew the Hoppy Street series, a rabbit that looked similar to Forever Friends bears.

The Forever Friends range included cards, postcards and stationery, plush bears, framed art, mugs and kitchenware, figurines and bed linen.

Some time around 2019-2020, production of Forever Friends plush bears ceased. Jones died in 2022.
