= Lympstone Manor =

Historic building in Devon, UK

Coordinates: 50.6403°N 3.4180°W

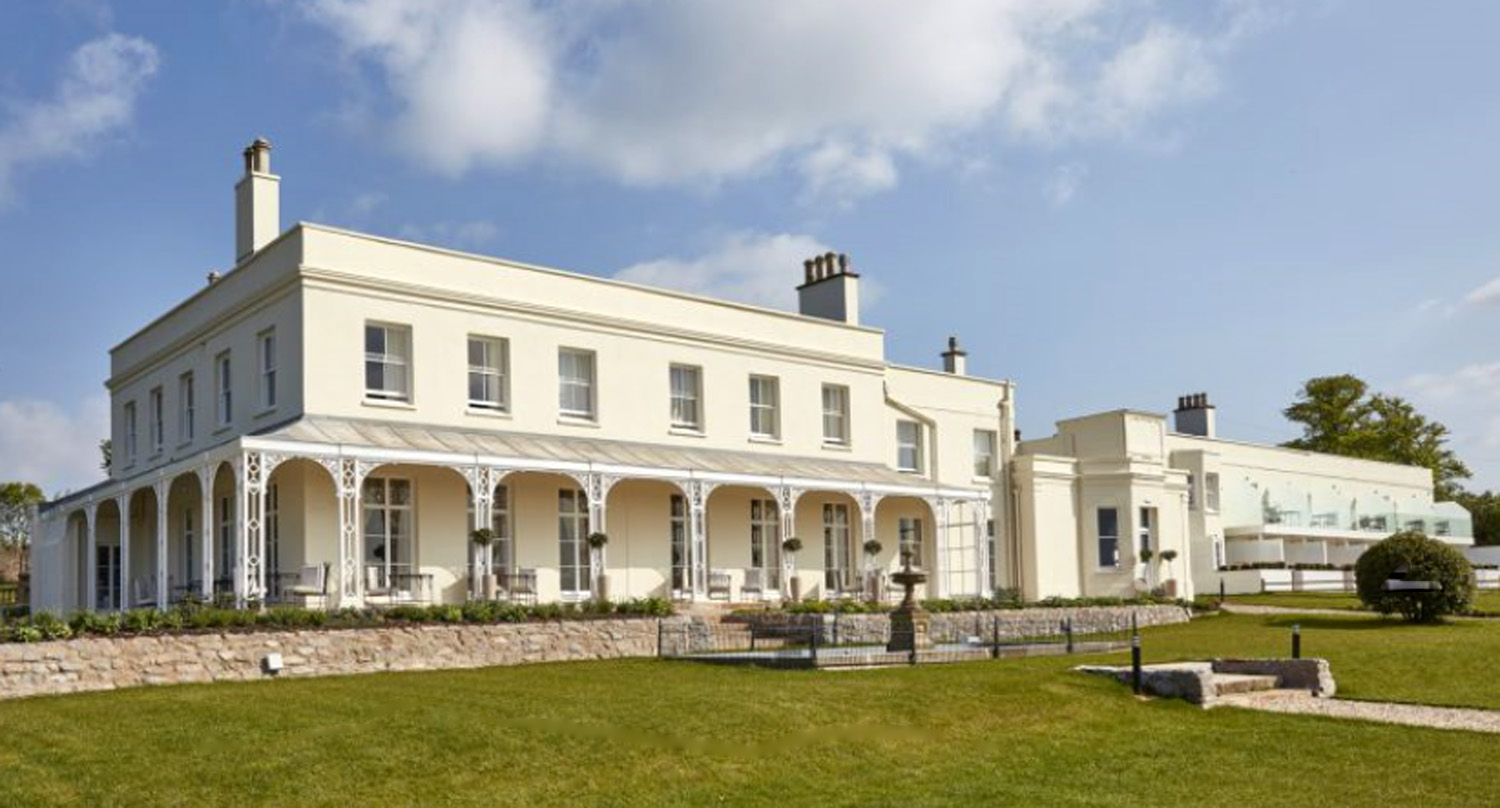
Lympstone Manor

Lympstone Manor (formerly Courtlands House) in Exmouth, Devon, England, is a building of historical significance and is Grade II listed on the English Heritage Register. It was mainly built in the 1760s around an older building which had been used as a farmhouse. At this time the owner was Charles Baring, a wealthy banker who had just been married. It was the residence of many notable people for the next two centuries. Since 2016, it has been a hotel, restaurant and vineyard run by Michael Caines who is the chef and owner.

The house has never held the Manorship of Lympstone, which instead has traditionally been associated with Nutwell Court.

== Early residents ==
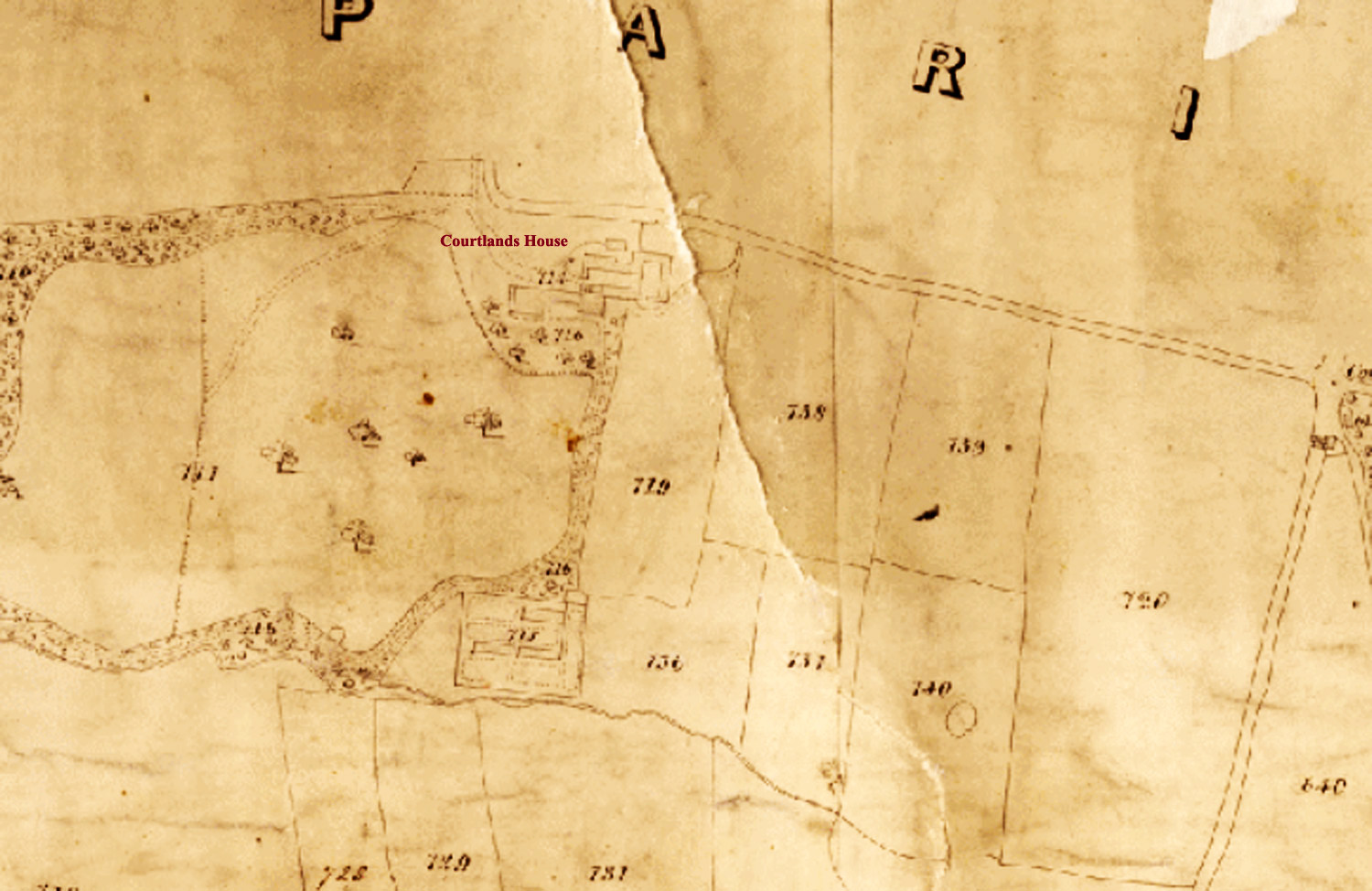
Map of Courtlands House in about 1840

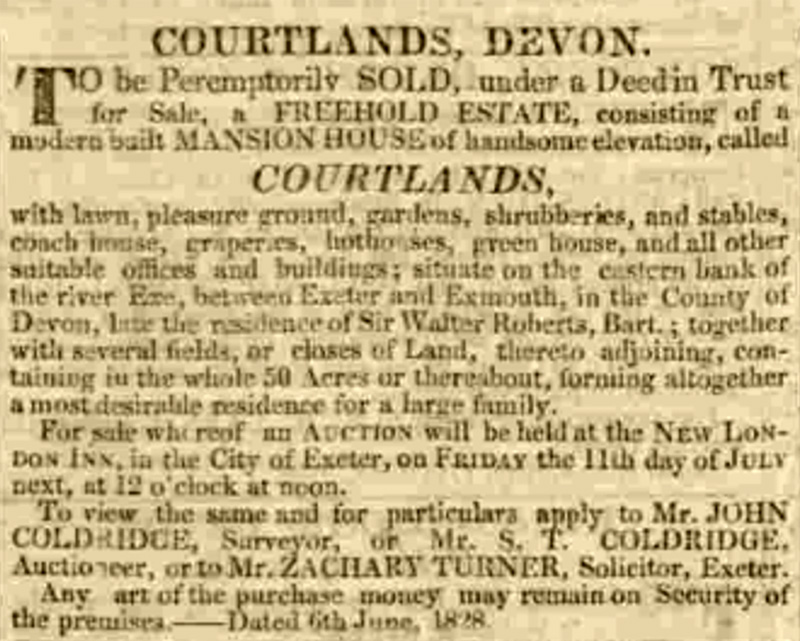
Sale notice for Courtlands House in 1828

Charles Baring (1741–1829) was born in 1741 in Larkbeare House in Exmouth. His father was John Baring, a wealthy merchant. Charles entered the banking business with his brothers Francis and John who foundered the famous Baring Bank. In 1767 he married Margaret Gould (1743–1803), who was the daughter and heiress of William Drake Gould of Lew Trenchard Manor. It is about this time that Courtlands House was transformed by Charles from a farmhouse to a mansion. The couple had nine children, seven daughters and two sons.

Margaret died in 1803 at Courtlands House. There is a memorial to her in Lympstone Church which survives today. Soon after this Charles sold Courtlands House to Lambert Blair. He died in 1815 and the house was sold to Sir Walter Roberts.

Sir Walter Roberts 9th Bt. (1620), and 2nd Bt. (1809), (1770–1828) was born in 1770. His father was Sir Thomas Roberts 8th and 1st Baronet of Britfieldstown, nr. Roberts' Cove, Co. Cork. He inherited his father's property in 1817, and died in 1828 upon which the house was sold. The advertisement for the sale described it as follows.

"A freehold estate consisting of a mansion house of handsome elevation called Courtlands with lawn, pleasure ground, garden, shrubberies and stables, coach house, graperies, hothouses, greenhouse and all other suitable offices and buildings."

The next owner was William Francis Spicer (1763–1853), who previously owned Weare House. His father was William Spicer, a Member of Parliament. He died in 1853 and as he had no living children the property was inherited by Richard Heaviside, his great nephew who changed his name to Richard William Spicer in accordance with the Will.

Richard seems to have rented the house to wealthy tenants for some time. The 1861 Census records John Wood, a landed proprietor and his wife Harriet as the occupants.

== Later occupants ==
The Browne family had purchased the property by 1862. Octavius Browne (1809–1876) was born in 1809 in London. His father was William Loder Browne. His brother was Hablot Knight Browne who became famous for his illustrations of Charles Dickens novels. In 1843 he married Martha Swete Cummins in Brixton and the couple lived there for several years. In 1847 he took his family to Australia to seek his fortune. He became quite wealthy and built a house in St Kilda, Melbourne. He became part of the social set which included the famous diarist Georgiana McCrae. She painted a portrait of him which is shown here

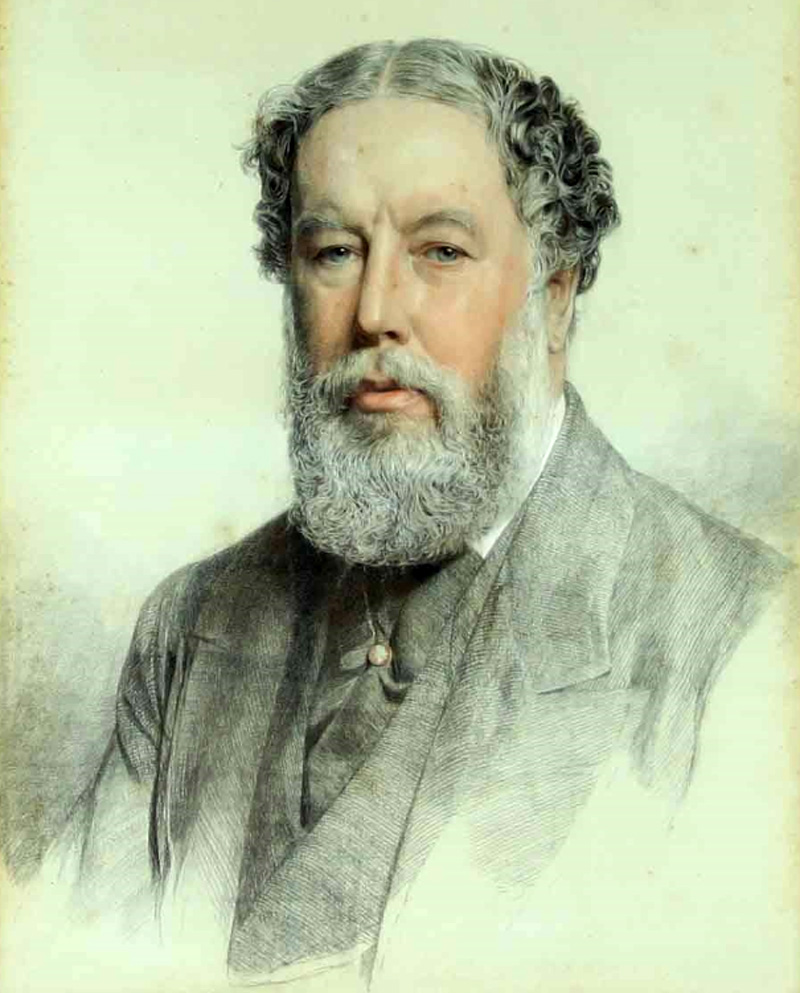
William Lethbridge

He sold his house in Melbourne and returned to England in 1854. He lived in Badgworth Gloucestershire for some time and then in about 1862 he purchased Courtlands House. He died in 1876 and his wife Martha continued to live at the house. She is shown in the 1881 Census as living there with her three unmarried daughters and seven servants. She sold the house in about 1886 to William Lethbridge.

William Lethbridge (1825–1901) was a barrister and very wealthy shareholder. He was born in 1825 into fairly moderate circumstances but acquired a large fortune. His father died when he was young and the family were forced to leave their farm which was called Wood House in Exeter. He was academically brilliant and obtained a scholarship to the University of Cambridge and later became a barrister.

One of his University friends asked him to join his family business W. H. Smith which was the enormous newspaper and bookselling firm. He did very well here and moved into the upper classes. He became the friend of the Canadian High Commissioner Sir Alexander Galt who persuaded him to invest in the Canadian North Western Coal and Navigation Company which made huge profits.

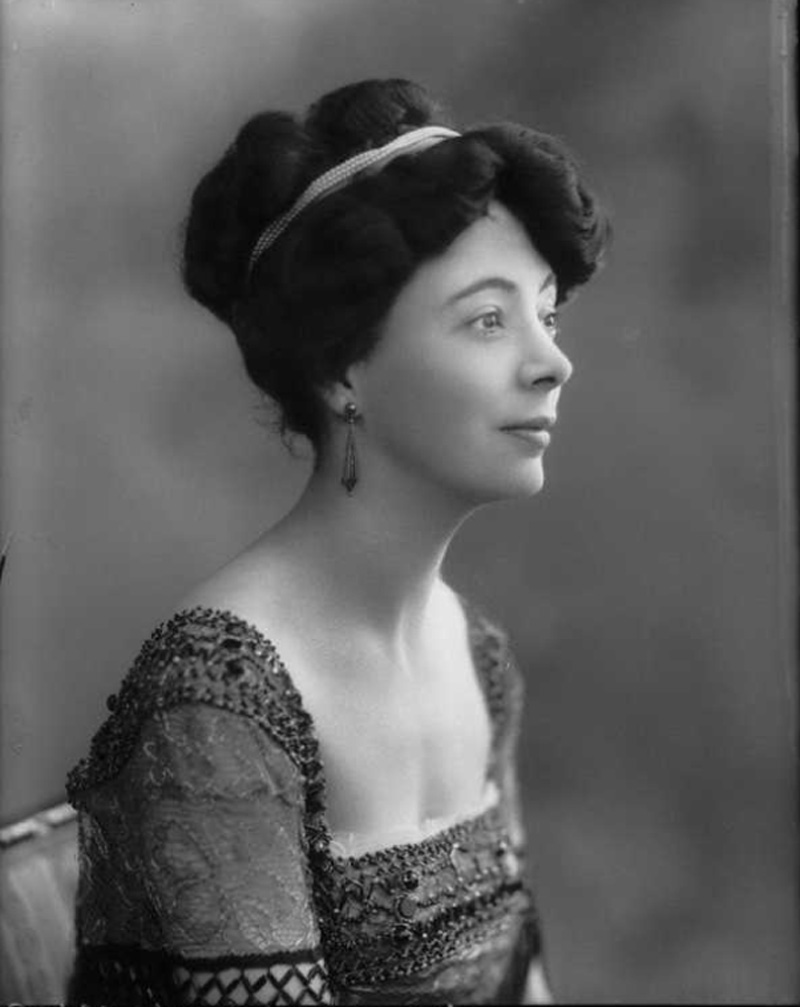
Charlotte Adams wife of Commander Henry William Allen Adams

In 1886 when he bought Courtlands House he was an extremely wealthy man. He did not marry but he lived there with his sister Mary Marshall Lethbridge. When he died in 1901 Mary inherited the house but she sold it shortly after to Mrs Mary Bridget Johnston, a wealthy widow.

Mary Bridget Johnston (1840–1908) was the widow of Thomas Johnson of Broomsleigh, Kent. She was born in 1840 in West Malling, Kent. Her father was Edward Thomas Luck, a landowner. In 1861 she married Thomas Johnson but the couple had no children. When she died in 1908 Courtlands House was inherited by her cousin General Sir George Luck. He did not live there but appears to have rented it to wealthy tenants. The first one was the Thornycroft family.

Charles Edward Thornycroft (1849–1927) and his wife Edith remained there until 1920. They are recorded in the 1911 Census as living there with their unmarried daughter Ruth and eight servants. After them Commander Henry William Allen Adams (1884–1862) and his new bride Charlotte were the residents of Courtland House. Both of them had been married before. Charlotte was the daughter of George Coats, 1st Baron Glentanar. She married first William Lionel Charles Walrond but he died in 1915. She then married Commander Adams in 1920. The couple remained at Courtlands until about 1923 when Sir Thomas Garbutt Knott became the owner.

Sir Thomas Garbutt Knott (1879–1949) was the owner of the house for the next 25 years. He was born in 1879 in Tynemouth, Northumberland. His father was Sir James Knott the famous shipping magnate who set up the Prince Line in 1895. Thomas married in 1907 an American divorcee Sarah Elizabeth Fowler but marriage did not last and they were divorced in 1924. He served in World War 1 by joining the New Zealand forces. Both of his brothers were killed in the War. He lived at Courtlands House until his death in 1949.
