= Colin Dunford Wood =

British Army and RAF officer (1918–1971)

Lieutenant Colonel Colin Dunford Wood DFC
- Born: Colin Diarmid Campbell Dunford Wood; 9 July 1918; Ipoh, Perak, Federated Malay States
- Died: 1971 (aged 52–53); Hampshire, England
- Education: Royal Military College, Sandhurst
- Spouse: Angela M. Elliott (m. 1946)
- Children: 3
- Relatives: Jesse Dunford Wood (grandson)
- Military career
- Allegiance: United Kingdom
- Branch: British Army; Royal Air Force
- Service years: 1938–1971
- Service number: 47302
- Commands: No. 2 Squadron IAF
- Conflicts: Waziristan campaign (1936–1939); Second World War; Anglo-Iraqi War; Siege of Habbaniya; Burma campaign; Arakan campaign; Western Allied invasion of Germany; Operation Plunder
- Awards: Distinguished Flying Cross

Lieutenant Colonel Colin Diarmid Campbell Dunford Wood (Note: Sometimes styled Dunford-Wood.) DFC (9 July 1918 – 1971) was a British soldier and Royal Air Force (RAF) officer who served in the British Indian Army before becoming a wartime pilot. During the Second World War, he took part in operations in Europe, Africa and Asia. He was awarded the Distinguished Flying Cross in 1943 for bombing and reconnaissance flights undertaken in Burma. After the war, Dunford Wood returned to the Army and transferred to the Royal Army Service Corps. He subsequently held a series of staff and logistical appointments, reaching the rank of lieutenant colonel in 1965. He was placed on the Army's Special List in 1968 and died in 1971.

== Biography ==
=== Early life ===
Colin Dunford Wood was born on 9 July 1918 to Joseph Dunford Wood, a barrister, and his wife, Meta, in Ipoh, Malaya and brought up largely in Tiree, Scotland, with his grandparents. His grandfather, Hugh MacDiarmid, was Factor to the Duke of Argyll, during a period of unrest among crofters in the late 19th-century. Dunford Wood was educated at Harrow School and Royal Military College, Sandhurst, subsequently attending the Staff College, where he qualified as a psc staff officer. He was commissioned into the Unattached List for the British Indian Army on 25 August 1938.

=== Indian Army and RAF ===
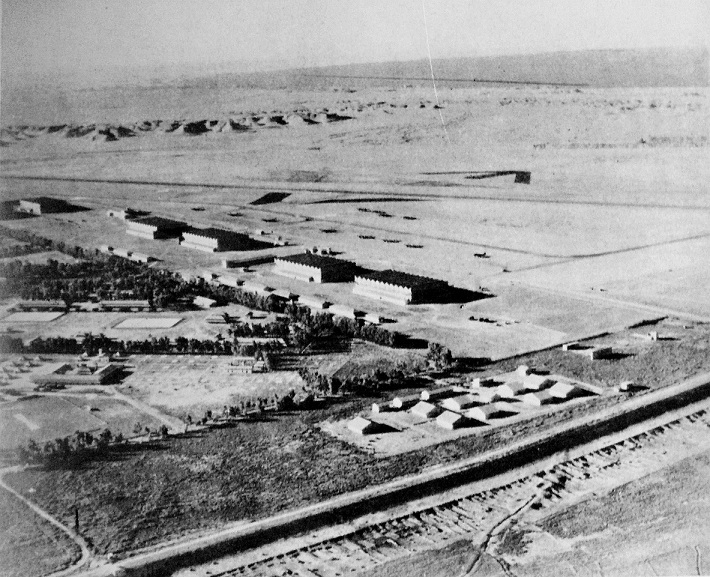
RAF Habbaniya, c. 1941.

From late 1938, in British India, Dunford Wood served on the North-West Frontier with the 13th Frontier Force Rifles, fighting against the Fakir of Ipi.

In October 1940, through a scheme to recruit volunteer Indian Army officers into the Royal Air Force, he received a temporary commission in the RAF's General Duties Branch as a pilot officer while retaining his Indian Army affiliation. He trained at No. 4 Flying Training School at RAF Habbaniya in Iraq from February to June 1941. Dunford Wood's first operational experience came during the Anglo-Iraqi War of 1941, when he was one of 39 pilots, made up of trainees and their instructors, who repulsed a force of around 9,000 Iraqis using obsolete biplanes and trainer aircraft during the Siege of Habbaniya in May 1941.

Dunford Wood was promoted to flying officer in October 1941 and to flight lieutenant in October 1942, and was an acting squadron leader in 1943. He subsequently served with No. 28 Squadron RAF, piloting Lysanders and Hurricanes during the first Arakan campaign in Burma, for which he received the DFC. The citation for the award recorded that, following his service in Iraq, he had been engaged in strategic bombing operations and reconnaissance, "the majority of which have been of great value to the army". It described him as showing considerable skill and courage and as inspiring fellow pilots through his example and leadership. During these operations, he was shot down by friendly fire; and, according to his diaries, flew the last Hurricane out of Burma in the face of the Japanese invasion. In May 1943 Dunford Wood became commanding officer of No. 2 Squadron IAF, serving in that capacity until September of that year.

His later wartime service included operations in Northwest Europe, flying Spitfires on reconnaissance missions to support the Allied advance across the Rhine. His campaign medals during World War II include the India General Service Medal (1936–1939), the Burma Star, the Africa Star, the France and Germany Star, in addition to the 1939–1945 Star.

=== Return to the Army ===
Dunford Wood relinquished his RAF commission on 1 March 1946 and returned to Indian Army duty. On 27 January 1948, he received a permanent commission in the Royal Army Service Corps. He subsequently served in a number of staff and logistical appointments, including Staff Captain (Q), Headquarters British Army of the Rhine, from 1950 to 1951; and Deputy Assistant Director of Supplies and Transport in 1951–52. He later served as Deputy Assistant Quartermaster-General with the MEMC Pool from 1954 to 1956 and as Deputy Assistant Adjutant and Quartermaster-General at Task Force Grapple from 1958 to 1959.

From 1962 to 1965, he served as Deputy Assistant Adjutant General (Co-ordination) at Eastern Command, followed by an appointment as Camp Commandant at a divisional headquarters from May 1965 to April 1966. He transferred from the Royal Army Service Corps to the Royal Corps of Transport on 15 July 1965 and was promoted to lieutenant colonel on 16 May 1965. He was placed on the Army's Special List on 9 July 1968.

=== Personal life and death ===
Dunford Wood married Angela M. Elliott on 12 March 1946 at St Peter and St Paul's Church, Stokenchurch; they had one daughter, Cynthia, and two sons, the artist Hugh Dunford Wood and writer and entrepreneur James Dunford Wood. By Hugh, his grandson is the chef and restaurateur Jesse Dunford Wood. He died in Hampshire in 1971, having suffered a heart attack.

=== Legacy ===
Dunford Wood's wartime diaries have been edited and published by his son James Dunford Wood in the three-volume series To Burma and Back (2020–2023). The latter is also the author of The Big Little War (2023), writing on the subject of the Siege of Habbaniya. Air Vice-Marshal A. G. Dudgeon dedicated his book Hidden Victory: The Battle of Habbaniya, May 1941 (2000) "[t]o the 'Forgotten Few' Officers, NCOs, Airmen and Pupils of No. 4 Flying Training School who, in May 1941, won a crucial victory against the Iraqi Army and Air Force but received no commendation for their success".
