= John Headon Stanbury =

English businessman

- Born: 6 May 1835; Barnstaple, England
- Died: 20 May 1907 (aged 72); Exeter, England
- Occupations: Hotelier; property developer
- Relatives: John Geoffrey Rowe Orchard (grandson)

John Headon Stanbury (6 May 1835 – 20 May 1907) was an English businessman, primarily a hotelier and property developer, who was active in the late 19th and early 20th centuries.

== Life and career ==
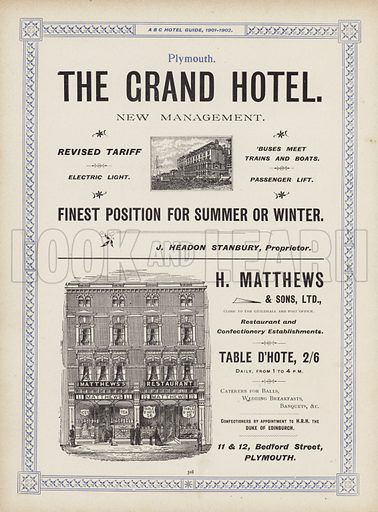
J. Headon Stanbury in the ABC Hotel Guide, 1901–2

Stanbury was born at Barnstaple on 6 May 1835, the son of Elizabeth Headon and John Stanbury, a yeoman and auctioneer. He owned an estate at Thrushelton and was a donor of the United Devon Association, the Society for the Encouragement of Arts, Manufactures and Commerce, and the Royal National Lifeboat Institution. He was also a member of the Devon County Agricultural Association and the Royal Bath and West of England Society.

In 1876, Stanbury bought the Star & Garter, a now demolished pub in Brentford, and, in 1879, he bought the Royal Clarence Hotel in Exeter, which was then thought to be the oldest hotel in England.

Stanbury was an assentor in the Exeter City Council elections of 1889 and 1892. He was also a member of the Exeter Theatre Company: in the 1890s, he served first as its vice-chairman and then as its chairman. On 7 February 1890, he formed The Heavitree Brewery Limited, a company which had emerged from the Heavitree Brewery PLC, one of the oldest pub companies in the south west, founded in 1790. On 19 November 1892, the company purchased The Finch Eagle Brewery in Exeter, followed by the neighbouring Windsor Brewery in North Street, Heavitree on 9 January 1899.

In 1893, Stanbury gave evidence before Francis Jeune, 1st Baron St Helier in the High Court of Justice at the hearing of Gooch v. Gooch (Lady Alice Elizabeth Gooch's suit for judicial separation from her husband Sir Alfred Sherlock Gooch, 9th Baronet).

After buying the Seymour Hotel in Totnes and the Western Counties Hotel in Paddington, Stanbury bought the Grand Hotel at Plymouth in 1895. In 1898, he sold the Half-Moon Hotel in Exeter. In 1899, Stanbury purchased Membland, an historic estate in Devon, from Edward Baring, 1st Baron Revelstoke, senior partner of Barings Bank, who rebuilt the mansion house known as Membland Hall. Stanbury planned to develop the area that bordered the River Yealm, and in 1900, sold it to William Cresswell Gray, a shipbuilder from Hartlepool, at which point the estate included the Hall and 2720 acres of land.

Stanbury died on 20 May 1907 in Exeter. His will was proved on 6 July, at which point his estate was reportedly worth some £44,452 (in excess of £7 million today). The Royal Clarence Hotel passed to his son-in-law (John Bailey Rowe Orchard) and then to his son (John Geoffrey Rowe Orchard). J. H. Stanbury & Co. continued to make donations after his death, including to the Royal Devon and Exeter Hospital.
