= Royal Clarence Hotel =

The Royal Clarence
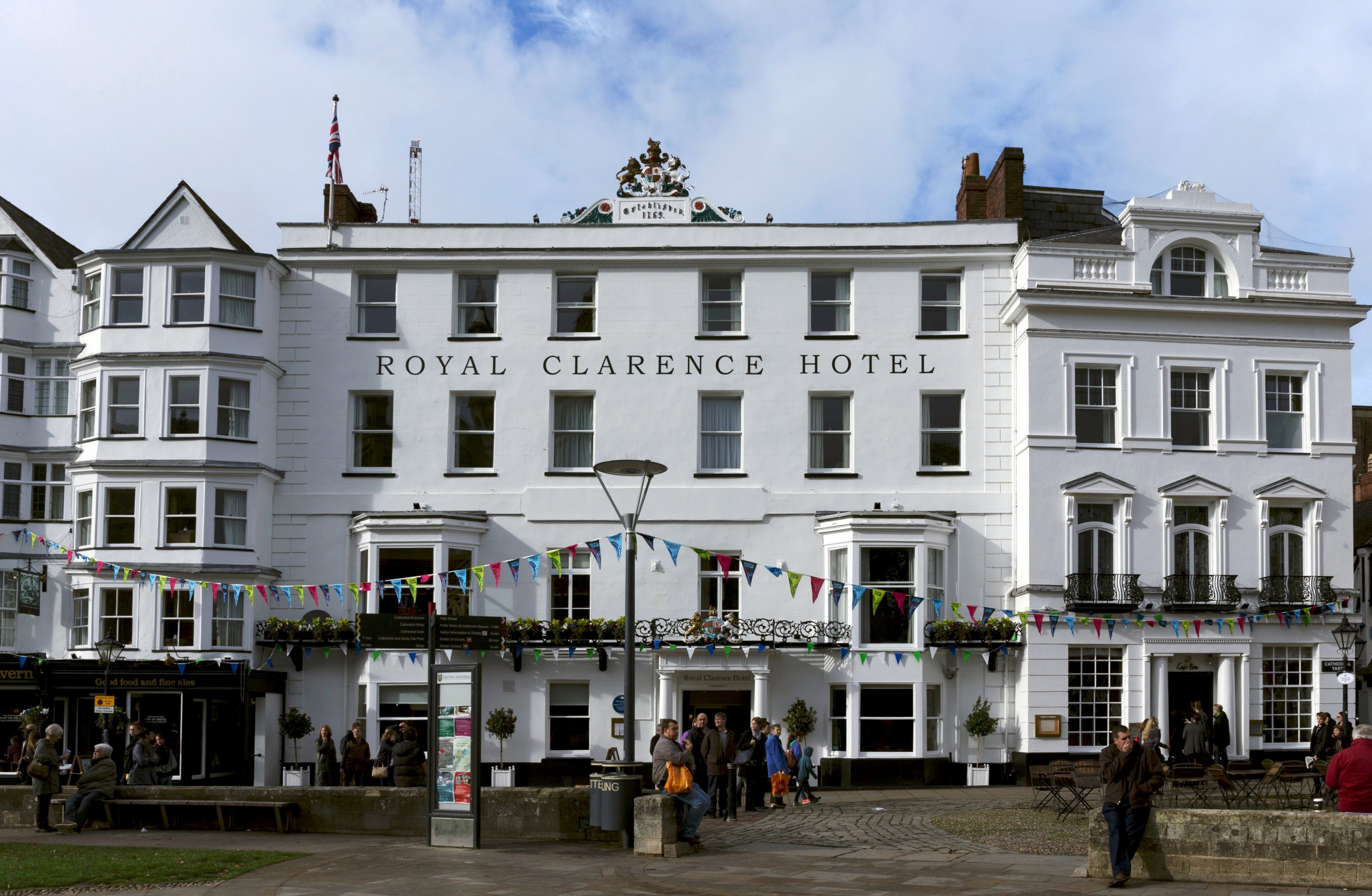
- The hotel in 2015
- Former names: Assembly Rooms; The Hotel; Cadogen Hotel; Thompsons Hotel; Phillips Hotel; The Royal Clarence Hotel

General information
- Status: Damaged (currently undergoing a major restoration due for completion by December 2027)
- Type: Hotel
- Location: Cathedral Yard, Exeter, England
- Coordinates: 50°43′24″N 3°31′49″W
- Named for: Adelaide, Duchess of Clarence
- Construction started: 1785; 1855; 1899; 2019; 28 January 2026
- Completed: 1787; 1855; 1900; December 2027
- Opened: 1769; December 2027
- Renovated: 1 April 2025 –31 December 2027
- Closed: 28 October 2016
- Destroyed: 28 October 2016
- Demolished: November 2016
- Owner: Andrew Brownsword Hotels

Design and construction
- Designations: Grade II listed

Other information
- Number of rooms: 53 bedrooms

Website
- www.theroyalclarence.com

The Royal Clarence Hotel is a former hotel in Cathedral Yard, Exeter, Devon, England. It is often described as the first property in England to be called a hotel; however, The German Hotel, London, was described in this way in 1710, so it is probably the second. Since 2005 the 53-bedroom hotel was branded as ABode Exeter.

The former hotel, soon to be renamed The Royal Clarence will be twenty-five luxury apartments, alongside a commercial retail space on the ground floor. Along with the two other currently damaged buildings including; Exeter Bank and The Well House Tavern were all severely damaged by a fire in October 2016. Since 1 April 2025, the three damaged buildings are currently undergoing a major restoration. Construction commenced on 28 January 2026 which is expected to be fully restored with an estimated completion date in December 2027.

On 25 July 2017 restoration plans were unveiled by the hotelier Andrew Brownsword. The restoration work was being undertaken by construction consultants Thomasons, in partnership with Manchester architects Buttress, Historic England and Exeter City Council. On 6 August 2019, it was announced that Andrew Brownsword Hotels had put the site up for sale, The reopening date is currently unknown. and the site was sold in August 2020 to James Brent of South West Lifestyle Brands Ltd.

The façades were originally planned to be reconstructed as a 74 bedroom hotel. However, in October 2021 it was announced that the hotel scheme was "unviable". An alternative plan was announced in December 2021, by the Akkeron Group, to repair and retain the original facade and exterior, and to construct twenty-three luxury apartments with a fully accessible restaurant, bar and two function rooms on the ground floor The proposals were approved in October 2022. The two-year building restoration commenced on 1 April 2025, which is due to be completed in December 2027.

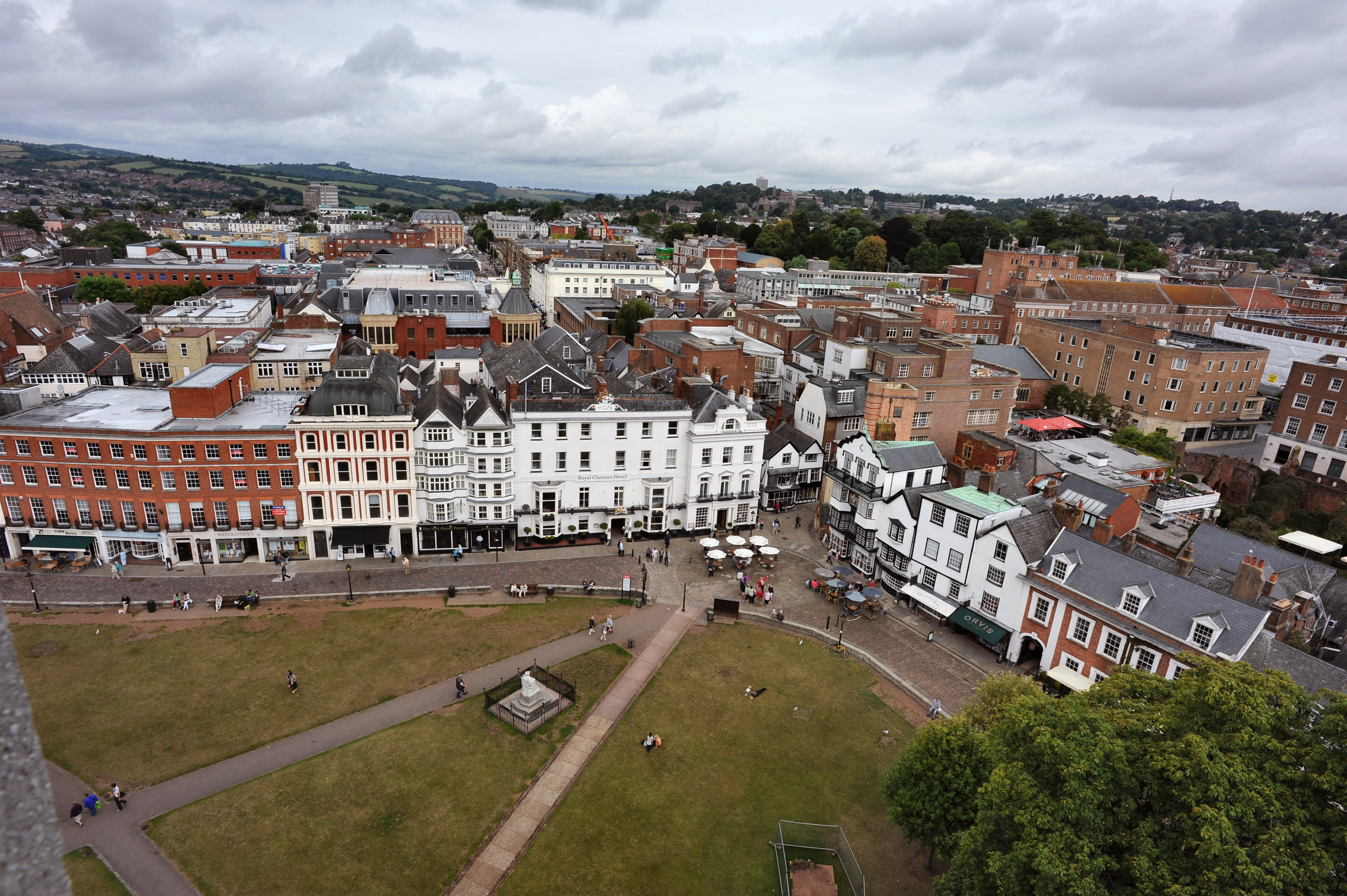
The hotel and surrounding buildings from the roof of the north tower of Exeter Cathedral in 2010

== History ==
Before the Reformation, the land which was to become the site of the hotel was part of the accommodation for Exeter Cathedral's Vicars choral. The site was later leased to a variety of tenants until in March 1766 the Reverend John Lee of Lympstone assigned the lease of the premises that he held there to William Mackworth Praed (1747–1833). Praed was a son of William Mackworth Praed, a lawyer and politician who had died in 1752. At the time of the transfer, part of the premises leased by John Lee was occupied by an under-tenant, a French school master named Peter Berlon, and Praed engaged him to manage the planned development of the site. Praed acquired other adjacent premises too, including the freehold of a property half way along St Martin's Lane, and dilapidated property in High Street, which he redeveloped separately. He also developed the adjacent building on the corner of St Martin's Lane for the Exeter Bank, of which he was one of the founding members, with John Duntze, Joseph Sanders and Daniel Hamilton.

It appears that work proceeded quickly on the hotel site because in early September 1766 a newspaper article referred to there having been "an Assembly at Mr Berlon's New Room" accompanied by "some curious Fireworks in the Churchyard". In August 1767 there was a newspaper notice of an entertainment to take place at "Mr Berlon's new Assembly-Room". By March 1768 Berlon was advertising his business as "Berlon's Coffee-house" and in November that year he announced that he had "lately fitted lodgings, for the conveniency of those Gentlemen and Ladies who please to honour him with their Favours".

In September 1770, Berton placed an advertisement for the business, describing it as "New Coffee-house, Inn, and Tavern, Or, The Hotel, In St. Peter's Church-yard, Exeter." This was long thought to be possibly the first use of the word hotel in England but, as Ian Mortimer points out in The Time Traveller's Guide to Regency Britain (2020), p. 225, the German Hotel in Suffolk Street, London, had been referred to as a hotel since at least 1710.

According to Alexander Jenkins, writing in 1806, the hotel provided "a commodious room for holding public balls, assemblies, concerts, &c.". Jenkins further described it as:

a large and commodious Inn, with elegant apartments and accommodation for people of the first Quality, with a large assembly-room in which are held the Assize Balls, Concerts and Winter assemblies, of the most distinguished persons of the City and County. In the front is a neat Coffee-room: the situation of the Hotel is very pleasant, as it opens to the Parade, and commands a noble view of the Cathedral.

It subsequently took various names, including the Cadogen Hotel, Thompsons Hotel, and Phillips Hotel.

The hotel became one of the leading coaching inns in Exeter. It was visited by Admiral Nelson in 1801, and was renamed as the Royal Clarence Hotel after a visit by Adelaide, Duchess of Clarence in July 1827. Franz Liszt performed with six other musicians in two concerts at the hotel on 28 and 29 August 1840 (a blue plaque on the building, erected by Exeter Civic Society in 2013, commemorated that event). Other visitors included Beatrix Potter in 1892, Thomas Hardy in 1915, and actors Clark Gable and Gary Cooper during the Second World War.

In 1879, the hotel was bought by businessman John Headon Stanbury. It was subsequently owned by his son-in-law (John Bailey Rowe Orchard) and grandson (John Geoffrey Rowe Orchard).

Between 2000 and 2015, the hotel was co-owned and run by celebrity chef Michael Caines, who set up ABode with business partner Andrew Brownsword. Brownsword bought the hotel in 2003 for £4.5 million.

== Building ==
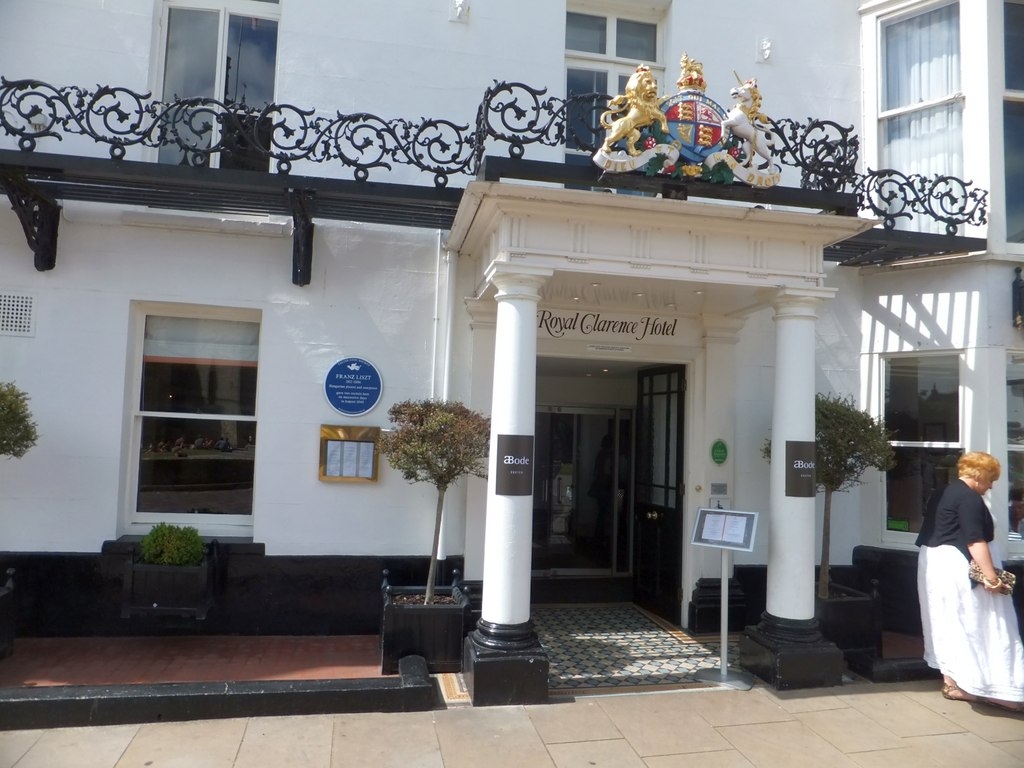
Doorway of the Royal Clarence Hotel, 2013

There was a range of medieval buildings on the site of the present buildings in Cathedral Yard. Some elements of these were retained in later reconstruction: the party wall between the Royal Clarence Hotel and the next property includes the remains of a 15th or 16th-century timber-framed side wall, two storeys high, belonging to a former building with roof line parallel to the street. The original 1769 building was partly remodelled in the Egyptian style in 1827, when it was also extended to incorporate the former Exeter Bank building adjoining Martin's Lane. Later alterations considerably changed the interior, though it retained its timber framing. It gained listed building status (Grade II) in 1953 as part of the group of listed buildings in Cathedral Yard.

== 2016 fire ==
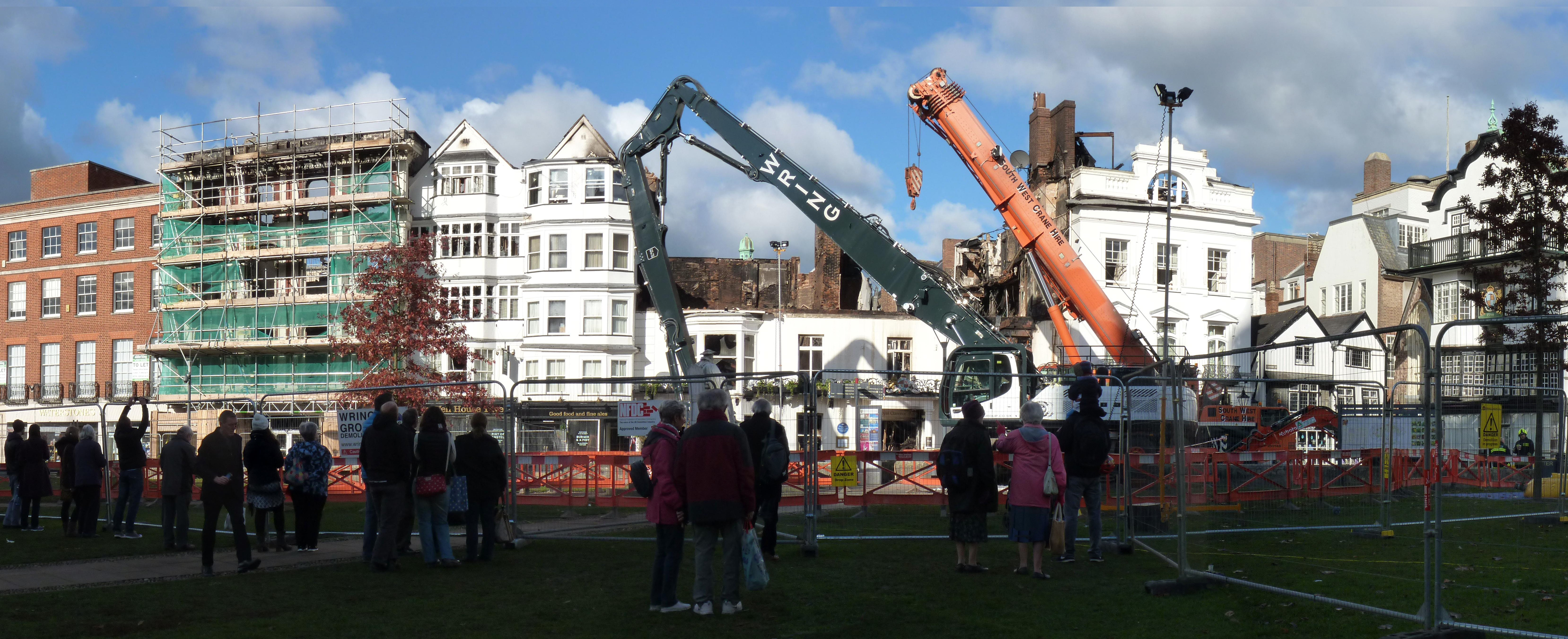
The hotel and adjoining buildings after the 2016 fire

On 28 October 2016 the hotel was gutted by a fire which began at 5 a.m. in an adjoining building part-used as an art gallery (the Castle Fine Art gallery), which was being converted at the time into flats. Hotel guests were evacuated to the nearby Mercure Southgate Hotel, and no casualties were reported. The fire was later fuelled by a ruptured gas main, and part of the frontage of the building collapsed. The interior of the grade II listed building where the fire started, 18 Cathedral Yard, was also destroyed, and the two listed buildings between were damaged, but firefighters prevented the fire spreading to other historic buildings. Over a hundred firefighters attended the incident and it was necessary to draw water from the River Exe to fight the fire. The people of Exeter helped by giving the firefighters free food and messages of support, and by limiting their use of water.

== Restoration ==
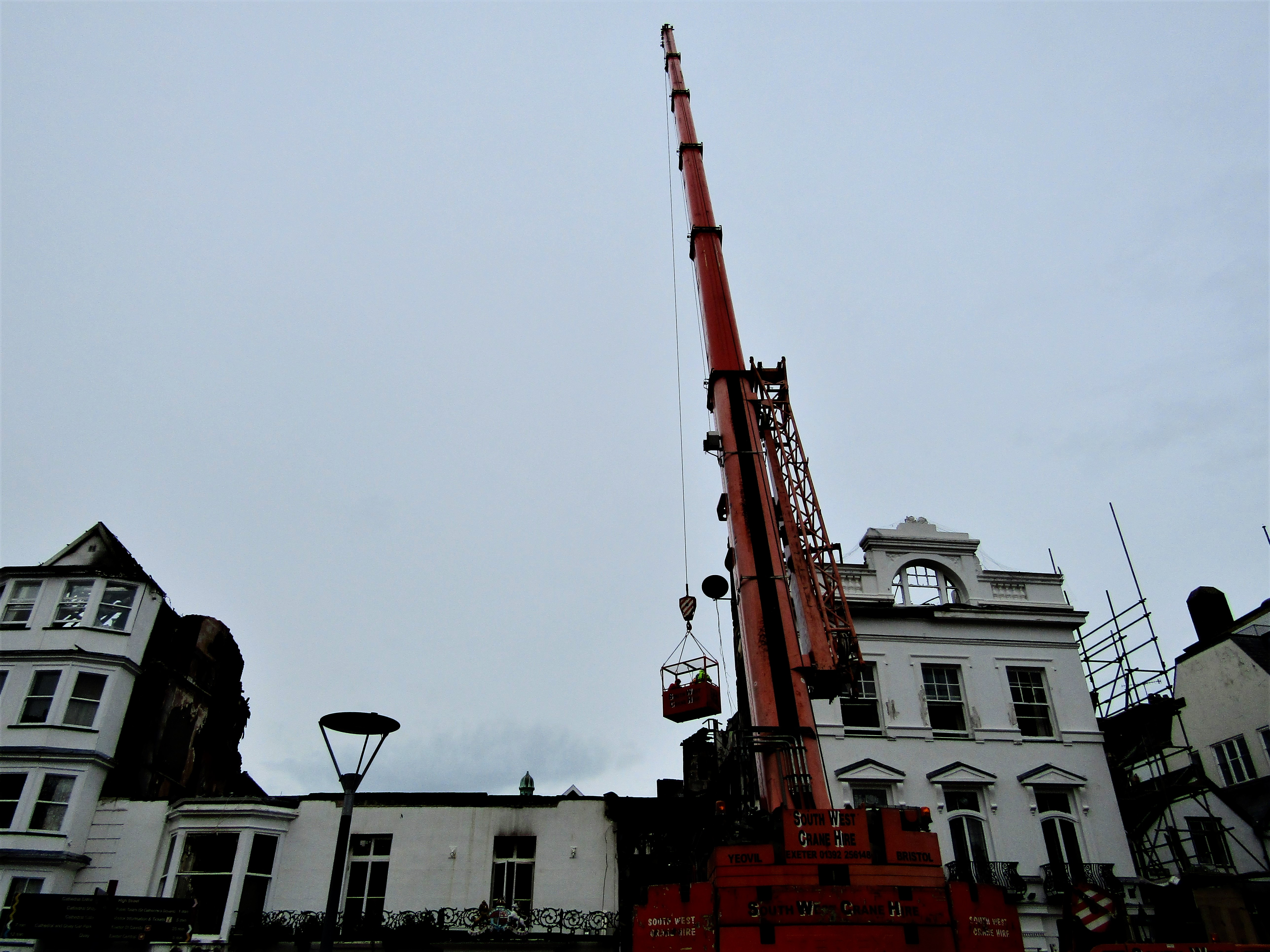
Workmen inspecting the fire damage at the hotel

After assessments were completed and remaining hotspots extinguished, demolition of the building started on 2 November 2016, with continuing efforts to salvage historically important material from the wreckage. The Christmas market in Cathedral Green made provision for the independent traders who were closed since the fire. The hotel's owner, Andrew Brownsword, said on 31 October: "We have every intention to rebuild the hotel with enormous sympathy to its importance and heritage, and to make it once again a building that the City of Exeter will be proud of." It was stated that a laser survey of the Royal Clarence made two years before the fire could help architects reconstruct the facade and the hotel.

On 22 February 2017, archaeologists involved in the restoration and rebuilding of The Royal Clarence Hotel unearthed medieval pictures, including one of a peacock. It was estimated it would take three months to complete the deconstruction of the building, with every effort being made to save as many historical features as possible, and a total of 21 months to restore the façade of the building and implement a modern design for the interior of the hotel. On 25 July 2017, official restoration renovations plans were unveiled for the exterior frontal facade. Further plans were underway for the interior of the hotel.

On 6 August 2019, Abode, the chain that owned the hotel, put the site of the Royal Clarence Hotel up for sale, stating they were unable to afford the completion of significant repairs to the building. The debris from the fire was cleared during the demolition works. The restoration work to the surviving interior historic fabric of building, including chambers, was strengthened and repaired. The site was then ready for the next stage of restoration and repair works of the hotel.

On 8 November 2019, repairs were completed on 18 Cathedral Yard, having undergone a three-year complete restoration undertaken by the same restorers who restored Windsor Castle following its 1992 fire, completed in November 1997. There was then a second round of bids for the sale, and restoration work to complete the repairs of The Well House Tavern Pub and The Royal Clarence Hotel.

On 18 August 2020, the site was sold to James Brent of South West Lifestyle Brands limited, and the former chairman of Plymouth Argyle Football Club. The approved planning permission was already in place for reconstruction of the Royal Clarence Hotel façades as a 74-bedroom hotel due to be completed after 18 months. However, on 28 October 2021 the development company said the hotel scheme was "significantly unviable" and it was working on an alternative plan.

On 1 December 2021, proposals were announced by property developer Akkeron Group for a £17 million restoration and reconstruction of the original facade and exterior, with twenty-three luxury apartments, and the ground floor fully accessible to visitors as The Well House Pub, featuring a bar, a large restaurant and two function rooms. Akkeron chairman James Brent said the redevelopment plans would "breathe new life into the historic and much-loved Royal Clarence building... We are also focused on retaining as much of the building's historic fabric as possible, restoring the famous façade to its former glory, so the Royal Clarence will look much as it previously did before the fire."

The restoration planning permission was approved on 11 October 2022. Demolition and reconstruction works will need to be undertaken to the remaining fabric and to buildings around the site, including Six Martin's Lane, which were said to be "unsalvageable" after being exposed to the elements for a number of years. It was agreed that plans be drawn up soon to "retain and showcase as many historical features of the remaining building fabric as possible".

On 19 December 2024, it was announced that local architecture NooKo will now undertake the reconstruction. The two-year restoration works commenced on 1 April 2025, which is due to be completed by April 2027. Nooko will use the already approved proposed restoration plans originally submitted by Akkeron group The reconstruction will involve; the rebuilding of the original external façade with crests, original iron works, stained glass windows and Royal Clarence lettering. A community time capsule will also be included in the restoration. Documenting the history of building, featuring from; employers, employees, guests and visitors of their stories and historic photographs of their own personal memories of the Royal Clarence Hotel.

A reopened commercial unit on the ground floor to the public, will include a restaurant, two large function rooms and the resorted Well House Pub public house next to the Exeter Bank and Royal Clarence buildings. From an accessible private front entrance from Cathedral Yard, there will be a mixture of two and three bedroom apartments and duplexes, from the first floor up. The top floors will be set away from the restored front of the façade, reducing the visual impact.

This will include, with unique views across Exeter. A private rooftop terrace for the residents only. Additionally, there will be a low maintenance amenity space courtyard. The buildings original existing building fabrics will be preserved, this will enable the exposure to the elements to honour the historical heritage of the original 14th-century building.

On 18 August 2025, Nooko announced, that they had submitted small amendments and alterations to the planning permission. The proposals include; Alternative designs on all apartments and duplexes. Which will now all feature two bedrooms. A new staircase will also be introduced. Alongside an internal light well that will be featured around some of the original, fire-scarred timbers. Therefore, preserving much more of the original building historical fabric materials from the previous design. Exeter City Council will announce their decision of subject to approval in November 2025.

Construction commenced on 28 January 2026, with the fully restoration scheduled for completion in December 2027.

== Sources ==
- Jenkins, Alexander (1806). The History and Description of the City of Exeter, and its Environs, Ancient and Modern, Civil and Ecclesiastical. Exeter: P. Hedgeland.
- Marsh, Darren (2017). Exeter's Royal Clarence Hotel. Exeter: The Devon and Exeter Institution. ISBN 978-0-9930172-2-3.
- Mortimer, Ian (2020). The Time Traveller's Guide to Regency Britain. London: The Bodley Head. ISBN 978-1847924568.
