= Clive Jacobs =

British businessman and entrepreneur

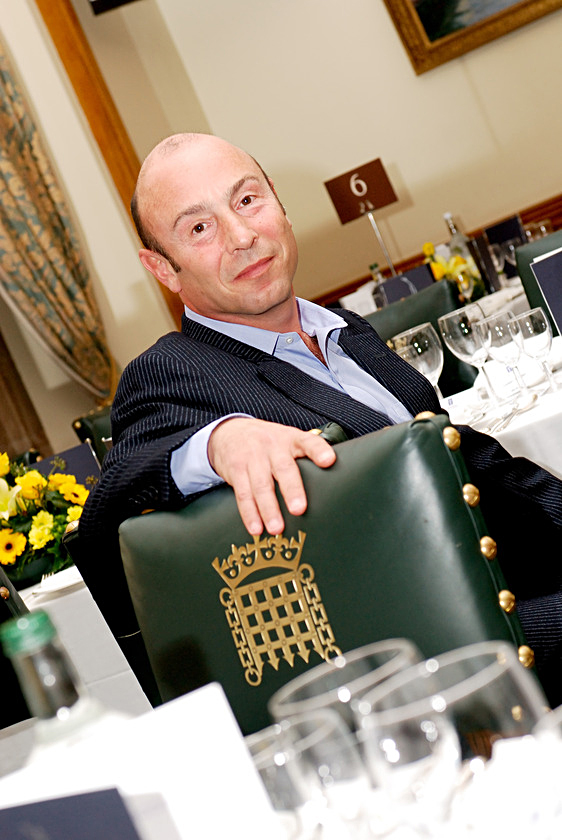
- Occupations: Businessman and entrepreneur
- Organization: Travel Weekly Group
- Website: clivejacobs.com

Clive Jacobs is a British businessman and entrepreneur. He is the founder of Holiday Autos Group and Travel Weekly Group.

== Career ==
=== Holiday Autos Group ===
In 1988, Clive Jacobs co-founded the Holiday Autos Group, which was the first car rental broker in Europe and one of the earliest travel companies to provide a pre-bookable, pre-paid, fully inclusive product that was guaranteed in price. The company also claimed to be the pioneer in offering a late deals car hire website. Backed by ECI Ventures Jacobs bought out his partners in 1995. Jacobs went on to sell Holiday Autos to lastminute.com for £43 million in 2003.

=== Travel Weekly Group ===
In 2009, Jacobs founded Travel Weekly Group and acquired Travel Weekly and its associated brands, websites and events from Reed Business Information.

In 2012, Clive Jacobs expanded his portfolio with the acquisition of The Caterer (formerly Caterer and Hotelkeeper) from Reed Business Information. Subsequently, in 2016, he launched the umbrella brand Jacobs Media Group. Jacobs serves as the chairman and majority owner of the group, which employs approximately 100 people based in Victoria, London.

=== Other business interests ===
In 2008 Jacobs bought the Michelin-starred New Angel Restaurant and Rooms in Dartmouth in Devon, which he went on to sell to Alan Murchison’s 10 in 8 Fine Dining Group in 2010.

In 2012, Jacobs was involved in talks with other investors, including former Thomas Cook Group executive Terry Fisher, about a possible £400 million buyout of Thomas Cook Group.

In 2014, Jacobs took a stake in and became chairman of luxury travel business Tully Luxury Travel (formerly known as The Cruise Professionals).
