= Northcote, Langho =

Hotel and restaurant in Lancashire, England

Northcote
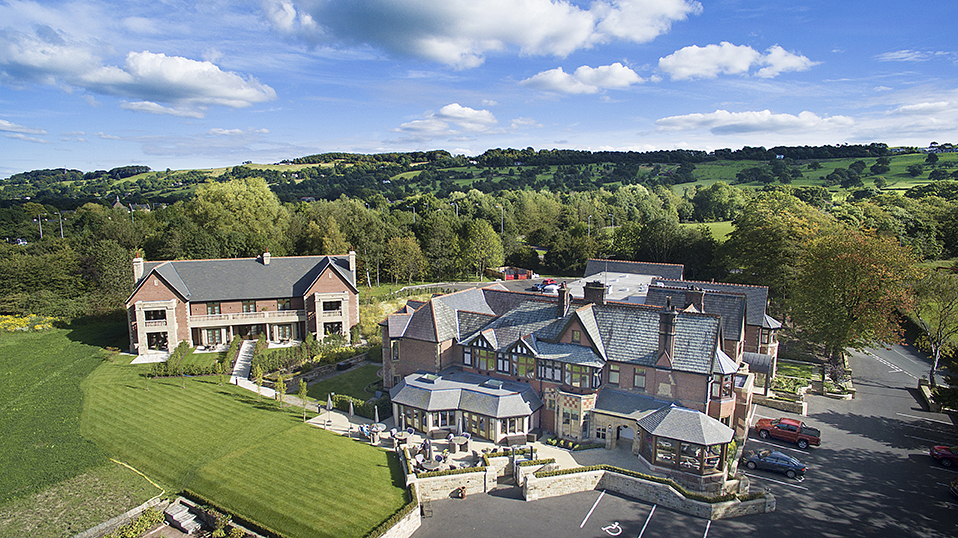
- Interactive map of Northcote

Restaurant information
- Established: 1983; 43 years ago
- Chef: Lisa Goodwin-Allen (Chef Patron-Director)
- Food type: Modern British
- Rating: (Michelin Guide); AA Rosettes
- Location: Langho, Lancashire, England
- Website: https://www.northcote.com

Northcote is a luxury hotel and Michelin-starred restaurant located in a 19th-century manor house in Langho, Lancashire, England. The restaurant has held 1 Michelin star continuously since 1996. The property features 18 bedrooms in the Manor House and 8 suites in the Garden Lodge.

== History and ownership ==
Northcote opened as a restaurant in 1983 and has since become one of the region’s leading gastronomic destinations.

Craig J Bancroft MI has served as Managing Director since 1983 and has played a central role in shaping the development and leadership of Northcote.

In 2024, the business announced new owners, Alf and Clare Ellis, with Lisa Goodwin-Allen taking on an expanded role as Chef Patron-Director.

Further details on major planned developments were reported in regional press, highlighting that Northcote is entering a period of significant transformation.

== The Hotel ==
Northcote operates a boutique luxury hotel with 18 Manor House bedrooms and 8 Garden Lodge suites.

Recent enhancements include an extended terrace and further development projects guided by the new ownership.

The hotel has earned significant recognition, including:

- AA Hotel of the Year (England) 2016–17
- VisitEngland Hotel of the Year 2017

== The Restaurant ==
Northcote’s restaurant is known for its modern British cuisine inspired by seasonal and regional ingredients. It has held a Michelin star continuously since 1996.

The kitchen is led by Chef Patron-Director Lisa Goodwin-Allen, who joined Northcote in 2001 and rose through the brigade to become Executive Chef and then Chef Patron-Director. She has appeared on Great British Menu and MasterChef: The Professionals and has received awards including Northern Hospitality Chef of the Year.

== Culinary Leadership: Lisa Goodwin-Allen ==
Lisa Goodwin-Allen became Head Chef in 2004 and retained Northcote’s Michelin star through subsequent leadership transitions. In 2024, she formally became Chef Patron-Director under the new ownership.

== Obsession Food Festival ==
Obsession is Northcote’s internationally recognised annual food festival, first launched in 2001. It brings leading chefs from across the UK and worldwide to Langho each January.

Obsession 26 took place over 17 days from 23 January 2026 and featured a rotating line-up of guest chefs presenting one-night-only tasting menus.

The festival is regarded as one of Europe’s most significant gastronomic events, known for its collaborative spirit and charitable fundraising.

== Cookery School ==
Northcote’s Cookery School offers hands-on classes in a purpose-built teaching kitchen, covering a variety of culinary techniques and themed courses taught by Northcote chefs.

== Chef’s Table ==
The Chef’s Table at Northcote provides an immersive dining experience located within the kitchen, where guests enjoy a bespoke tasting menu while observing service and interacting with chefs.

== Awards and recognition ==
Northcote has received numerous accolades, including:

- (held continuously since 1996)
- AA Hotel of the Year (England) 2016–17
- VisitEngland Hotel of the Year 2017

A comprehensive list of awards is available on the hotel’s official website.

== See also ==
- Lisa Goodwin-Allen
- Ribble Valley
- Lancashire cuisine
