= Andrew Brownsword =

English entrepreneur (born 1947)

Andrew Douglas Brownsword CBE DL (born 1947) is an English entrepreneur who established the Forever Friends company. He has regularly featured on the Sunday Times Rich List, with an estimated fortune of £190 million.

== Biography ==
Brownsword attended The Harvey Grammar School in Folkestone and then trained as a chef.

=== Career ===
He started the Andrew Brownsword Collection, a publishing business founded in Bath in 1971. Brownsword started by selling greeting cards to retailers like WH Smith from boxes out of the back of his car.

In 1987, he agreed to market artist Deborah Jones Teddy Bear design, developing the Forever Friends genre in a flat above a Chinese takeaway in Reading, Berkshire in the early 1980s:

"I wanted to develop a teddy bear that appealed to adults as well as children. I based Forever Friends specifically on the teddy bear that Sebastian Flyte carried around in Brideshead Revisited. It became the bear found in the attic."

The success created a financial income to develop the Andrew Brownsword Group, based on greetings cards and associated gifts with a peak turnover of £65 million. The Andrew Brownsword Collection, Andrew Brownsword Gifts and the Gordon Fraser Gallery (the latter acquired in 1989), were acquired by Hallmark Cards in 1994 for an estimated £195 million. Brownsword became Chief Executive of Hallmark in Europe, a position which he held for four and a half years before leaving to develop other business interests.

In the late 1990s he commissioned the artist John Pascoe to paint the reception room ceiling of his Royal Crescent home in Bath.

Brownsword has used these monies to purchase property and hotels forming the group, Andrew Brownsword Hotels (The Bath Priory, Gidleigh Park in Devon, and Sydney House in Chelsea, London). In 2006 ABode Hotels was created as a city centre boutique hotel brand (of which the Royal Clarence Hotel in Exeter was destroyed by fire in 2016);. With the demise of Von Essen hotels in 2011, Andrew Brownsword Hotels acquired four properties; Buckland Manor, Amberley Castle, Lower Slaughter Manor & The Slaughters Country Inn, expanding the collection. Andrew Brownsword Hotels expanded again to 14 hotels in 2016 with the purchase of the Old Swan & Minster Mill in Oxfordshire and The Imperial Torquay.

Brownsword also purchased various businesses including Paxton & Whitfield cheesemonger in London and Snow and Rock; founding local radio station Bath FM with journalist and local resident Jonathan Dimbleby; and buying Bath Rugby.

In April 2010, Brownsword sold Bath Rugby to businessman Bruce Craig.

=== Charity ===
The Andrew Brownsword Art Foundation is a registered charity which aims to buy and loans works of art to mainly UK based museums. The collection includes works by Thomas Gainsborough.

He was appointed Commander of the Order of the British Empire (CBE) in the 2014 Birthday Honours for services to the arts, heritage, and health in Bath and South-West England.

Brownsword is also a member of the charitable Society of Merchant Venturers.

=== Personal life ===
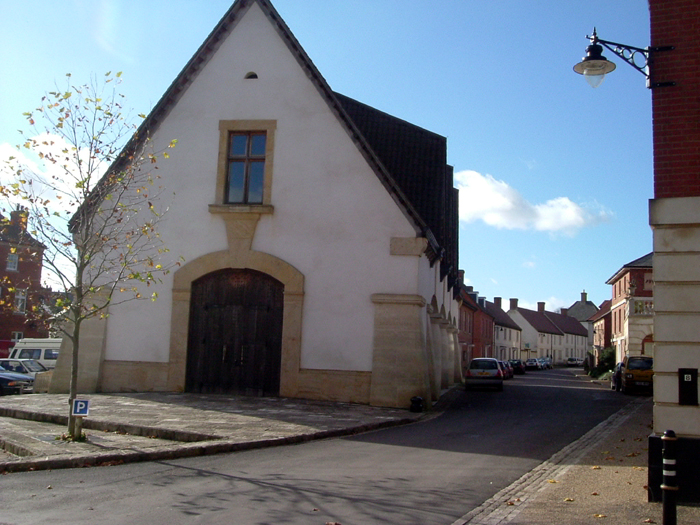
Brownsword Hall, the marketplace in King Charles's new town development of Poundbury, funded by and named after Brownsword

Married to Christina, Brownsword has two daughters.

A methodist, having become heavily involved in The Prince's Trust, he is known to King Charles III. Brownsword sponsored the £1 million development of the markethall at Poundbury, designed by John Simpson & Partners and based on early designs, particularly the one in Tetbury.
