= Gidleigh Park =

Hotel and restaurant in Devon, England

Coordinates: 50.6765°N 3.8740°W

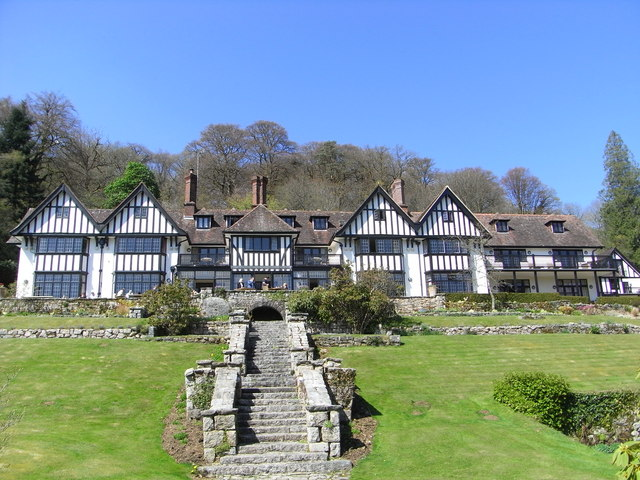
- Interactive map of Gidleigh Park

Restaurant information
- Owner: Andrew Brownsword
- Head chef: Chris Eden
- Food type: Modern British
- Rating: 5 red stars (The AA); AA Rosettes (2026) (2011-2016) - Michael Caines (2016-2018) - Michael Caines (2018-2019) - Chris Simpson (2023- ) - Chris Eden
- Location: Chagford, Devon, England
- Website: Official website

Gidleigh Park is a 5-star hotel and restaurant located in Gidleigh, near Chagford, Devon, England. The restaurant currently holds 1 Michelin star and three rosettes from The AA. The hotel belongs to Andrew Brownsword Hotels which was named AA Hotel Group of the Year 2017–18.

== Description ==
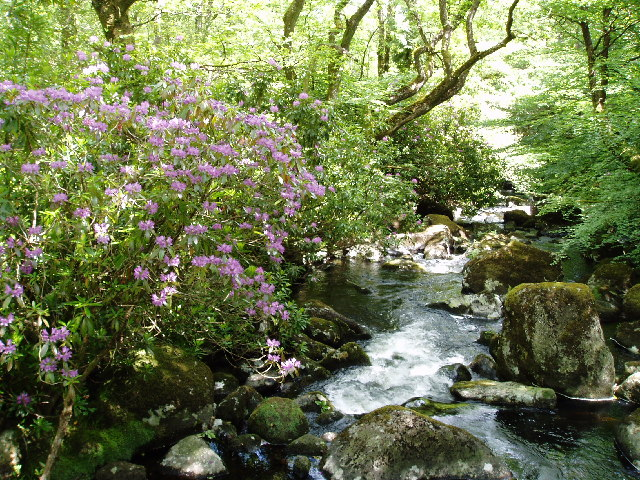
River Teign, Gidleigh Park. Taken from the bridge crossing the River Teign in the wooded grounds of the Gidleigh Park Hotel

Paul and Kay Henderson bought the hotel and restaurant in 1978. The building is a Tudor–style country house set in 107 acres of gardens and woodlands. In 2005, it was bought by entrepreneur Andrew Brownsword who completed a renovation during 2007, refitting both the restaurant and the hotel, adding another ten bedrooms.

== Restaurant and chefs ==
The restaurant gained prestige with Michael Caines as head chef (and later executive head chef) from 1994 until 2016. In 2011, the restaurant was awarded with 1 Michelin star, and then in 2016 with a second star.

From 2009, Caines became executive head chef, overseeing a number of restaurants, whilst Ian Webber remained on site as head chef. Following this, a number of other chefs took over with Michael Wignall joining as Executive Head Chef from 2016 to 2018, coming from The Latymer at Pennyhill Park Hotel, followed by Chris Simpson from Restaurant Nathan Outlaw.

Simpson managed to retain one Michelin star during his tenure, but in 2019 the restaurant lost its remaining star. In that same year Chris Eden joined as Executive Head Chef in September of that year, coming from his role at the Michelin-starred Driftwood in Portscatho, Cornwall. to 2019. Under Eden, the restaurant regained its Michelin Star status in 2023. Eden announced in July 2024 his intention to leave Gidleigh Park, and it was confirmed in September that he would be leaving for the Watergate Bay Hotel in Cornwall.

== Reception ==
Susan D'Arcy of Times Online reviewed the hotel and restaurant in February 2007. It described the restaurant as offering "some of the best dining in the UK". The food received a score of nine out of ten.

In 2009, the hotel won the "Hotel of the Year award" in the Enjoy England Awards for Excellence. It was the first year that the small and large hotel categories had been absorbed into a single category based on quality. In 2010, it was named as the best restaurant in Britain in the first ever Sunday Times Food List, beating The Fat Duck into second place, and Marcus Wareing at the Berkeley into third.

In 2013, the restaurant won Harden's Sunday Times Restaurant of the Year, along with Wine List of the year and came second for Best Service of the Year

== See also ==
- Jesse Dunford Wood, a notable chef trained at Gidleigh Park
