= Holbeck Ghyll =

Coordinates: 54.4117°N 2.9388°W

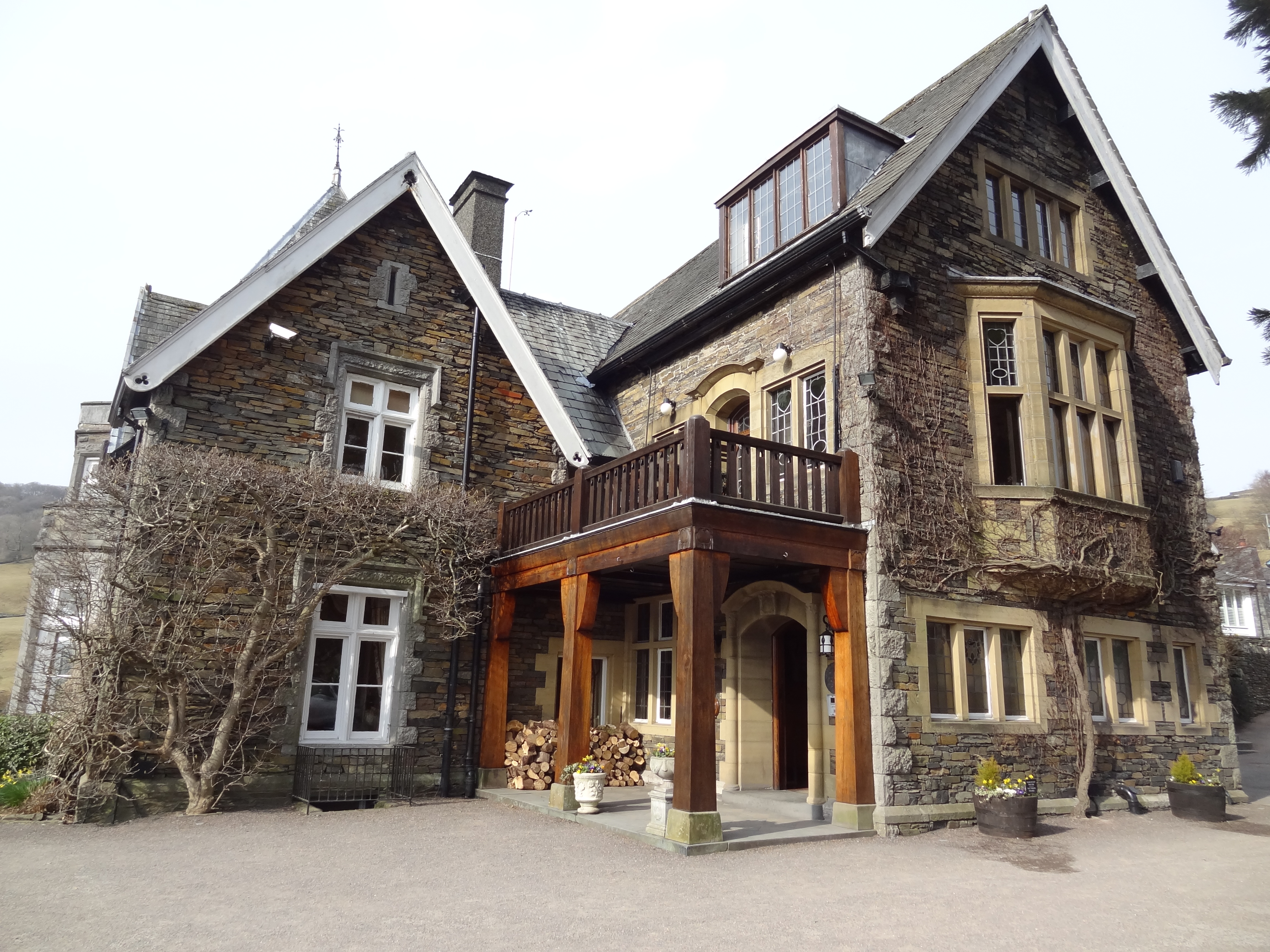

Restaurant information
- Rating: NA
- City: Windermere, Cumbria
- Country: England

Holbeck Ghyll is a restaurant located in Windermere, Cumbria, England. "The late 19th century building was once Lord Lonsdale's hunting lodge and only became a hotel in the 1970s. It won a Michelin star in 1998 but lost it in 2014. It has failed to reclaim the star since. The restaurant is formal and the food a "contemporary take on French and British cuisine".

Holbeck Ghyll was featured in The Trip, a 2010 BBC comedy starring Steve Coogan and Rob Brydon as fictionalised versions of themselves doing a restaurant tour of northern England.
