= The Caterer =

Multimedia brand for the UK hospitality industry

- Editor: James Stagg
- Categories: Media
- Frequency: Weekly
- Founded: 1878
- Company: Jacobs Media
- Country: United Kingdom
- Based in: London
- Language: British English
- Website: thecaterer.com
- ISSN: 0008-7777

The Caterer is a multimedia brand for the UK hospitality industry. Since 1878 it has been helping operators build better businesses and better careers, as well as providing suppliers with a platform to showcase their most innovative products and services. It is the only hospitality media brand with a pan-industry focus and reach, with extensive coverage of hotels, restaurants, foodservice and pubs/bars.

== History and profile ==
Caterer and Hotelkeeper (now The Caterer), first issued in 1878, was published by Reed Business Information until 2012, when it was bought by Travel Weekly Group and Jacobs Media Group owner Clive Jacobs. It employs around 30 staff and is based in Victoria, London, UK. It is published by Jacobs Media Group. As of 24 August 2020, the editor is James Stagg.

On 2 July 2014, Caterer and Hotelkeeper rebranded as The Caterer. Its coverage of the industry stayed the same but the name was changed.

The Caterer became an entirely-digital brand on 10 May 2024, stopping the production of its print issues and a new website was launched.

== Events and awards ==
The Caterer runs several events each year, including The Catey Awards, which launched in 1984. The Cateys have in the past honoured industry personalities including Gordon Ramsay, Albert Roux, Michel Roux, Marco Pierre White and Heston Blumenthal. The awards highlight those in the industry doing the best in their field, and are judged by a host of senior professionals.

In the 2022 Catey Awards, Lisa Goodwin-Allen took home Best Chef, Jeremy King won the Lifetime Achievement Award and Hélène Darroze received the International Outstanding Achievement Award.

Other awards events include:

- Hotel Cateys
- Foodservice Cateys
- Acorn Awards
- Hotelier of the Year Award
- The Caterer Summits
- Best Places to Work in Hospitality

== The Caterer Top 100 ==
The Caterer Top 100 is a list of the 100 most influential people in the hospitality industry. The list is compiled by industry experts who rank candidates on criteria including direct power, success, innovation, future potential and their wider influence across the industry. Previous recipients of The Caterer most influential person in the industry include Jamie Oliver and Alastair Storey.
