= Lisa Goodwin-Allen =

British chef (born 1981)

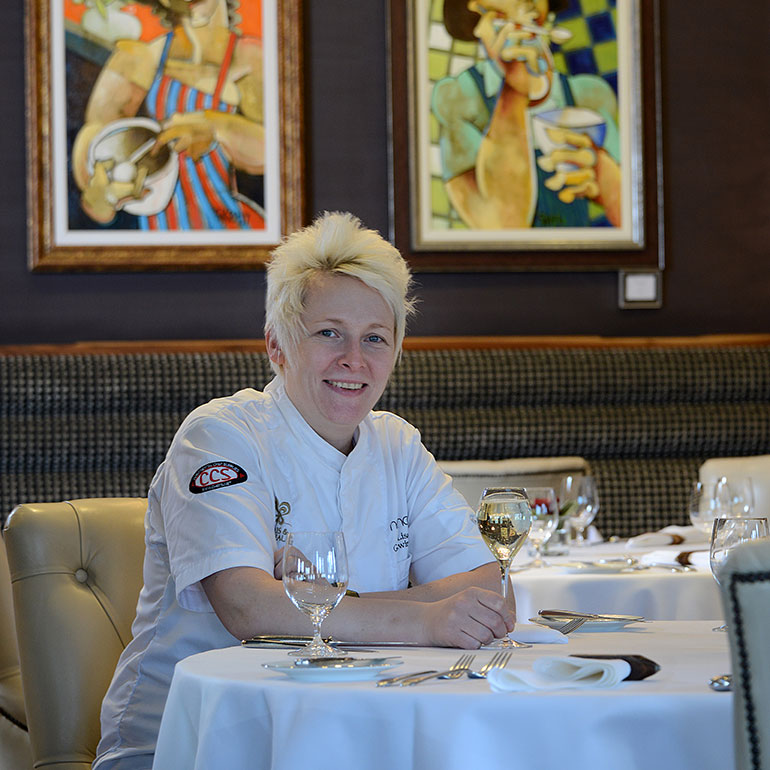
- Lisa Goodwin-Allen, Executive Head Chef at Northcote, Langho, Lancashire
- Born: 29 April 1981 (age 45); Lancaster, Lancashire, England, UK
- Spouse: Steve Goodwin-Allen
- Culinary career
- Cooking style: British cuisine
- Rating
- Michelin stars
- Current restaurant
- Northcote
- Television shows
- Great British Menu; MasterChef: The Professionals
- Awardss
- 2008 Northern Hospitality Awards: Chef of the Year; 2011 Craft Guild of Chefs Awards: Restaurant Chef of the Year

Lisa Goodwin-Allen (born Lisa Allen, 29 April 1981) is a British chef best known for being the executive chef of the Michelin-starred Northcote restaurant. She was also one of four winning chefs on season five of the BBC cooking show Great British Menu.

== Career ==
Allen began her culinary career by working at the restaurant Holbeck Ghyll in Windermere, Cumbria. She worked there on a part-time basis whilst completing three National Vocational Qualification in catering. She also worked at Le Champignon Sauvage in Cheltenham, Gloucestershire, which resulted in her being given a full-time position upon completing her college course.

After a year at the restaurant she felt that she wanted to return home to the north of England and found employment at Northcote under Nigel Haworth as a demi chef de partie in 2001, at the age of 20. She later explained that when she joined, she originally intended to stay for a year or two and then move on. After a year she was promoted to chef de partie. In 2003, she became a junior sous chef and was again promoted, to sous chef, after a year. In 2004 she was named head chef of the restaurant and placed in overall charge of the kitchen, at the age of 23.

In 2018 she successfully retained the Michelin star at Northcote that had been held by Haworth since 1996, as he moved on to be chef ambassador of the restaurant.

She was a finalist for the Roux Scholarship in 2006, which was awarded to Pravin Sharma. In 2008 she was named Chef of the Year by the Northern Hospitality Awards. She competed in the fifth season of the BBC cooking show Great British Menu in 2010 in the north-west section of the competition. Allen was the only female chef competing in the competition. She competed against fellow local chefs Johnnie Mountain and Aiden Byrne. Marcus Wareing was the mentor for the group, which saw her win the round and go through to the final. She ended up with a winning dish, becoming one of four chefs to cook at a banquet hosted by Prince Charles. Her winning dish was a rabbit and leek turnover with piccalilli. In 2011, she was named Restaurant Chef of the Year by the Craft Guild of Chefs.

She appeared in series 8, episode 18 of MasterChef: The Professionals as a chef mentor for the semi-finalists.

After at least 23 years of working, Allen's departure from Northcote was announced on 10 March 2025. One month later, in late April 2025, she reversed her departure when Northcote was sold by Stafford Collection, which owned the restaurant since 2019, to an investment firm Silkstone Finance.

== Personal life ==
Allen has an allergy to shellfish.

In The Christmas Great British Menu 2020 she won three of the six courses that made it to the final banquet that was served to NHS and key workers in thanks for their work during the COVID-19 pandemic.
