= List of restaurants in London =

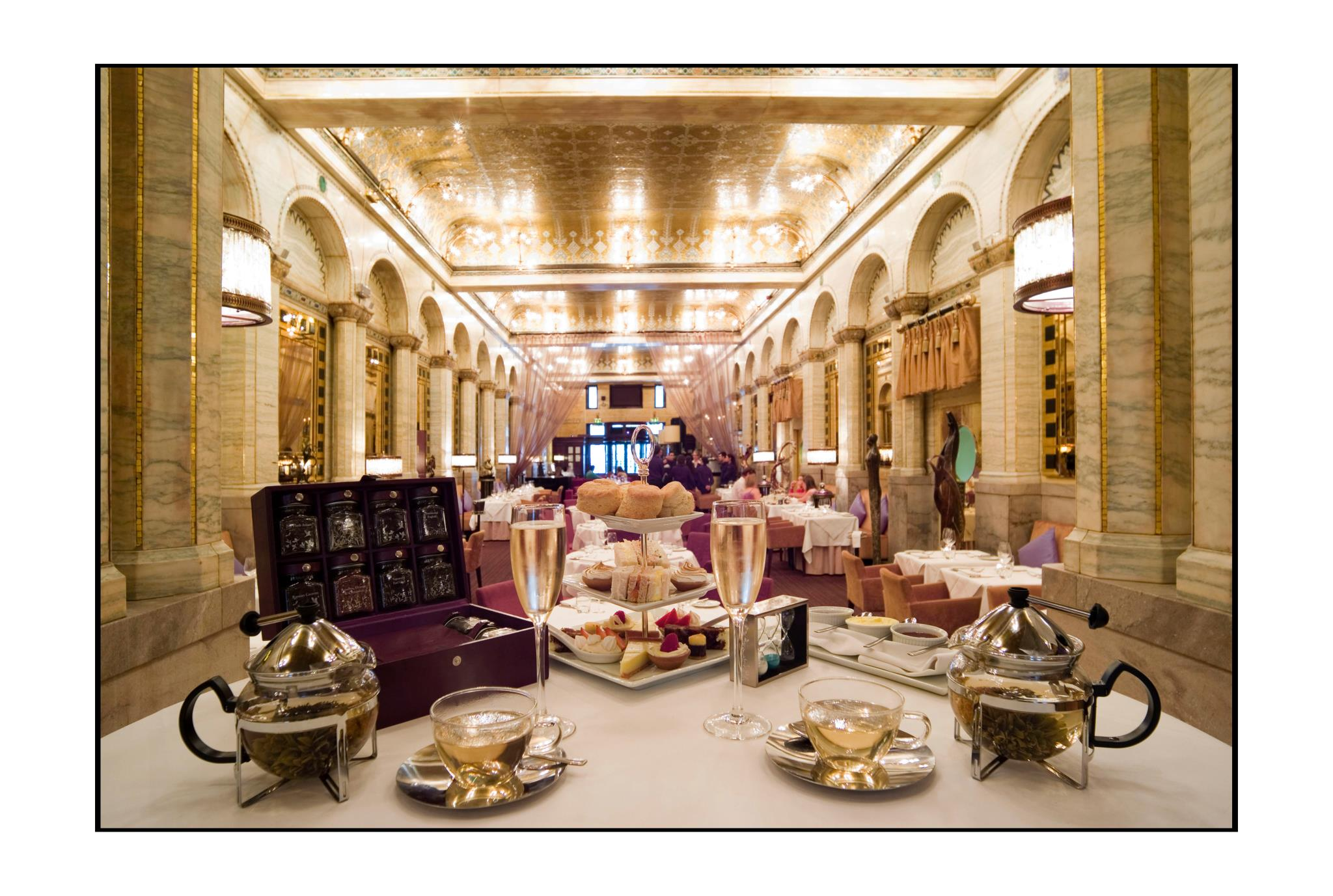
Afternoon tea set at the Criterion Restaurant, London

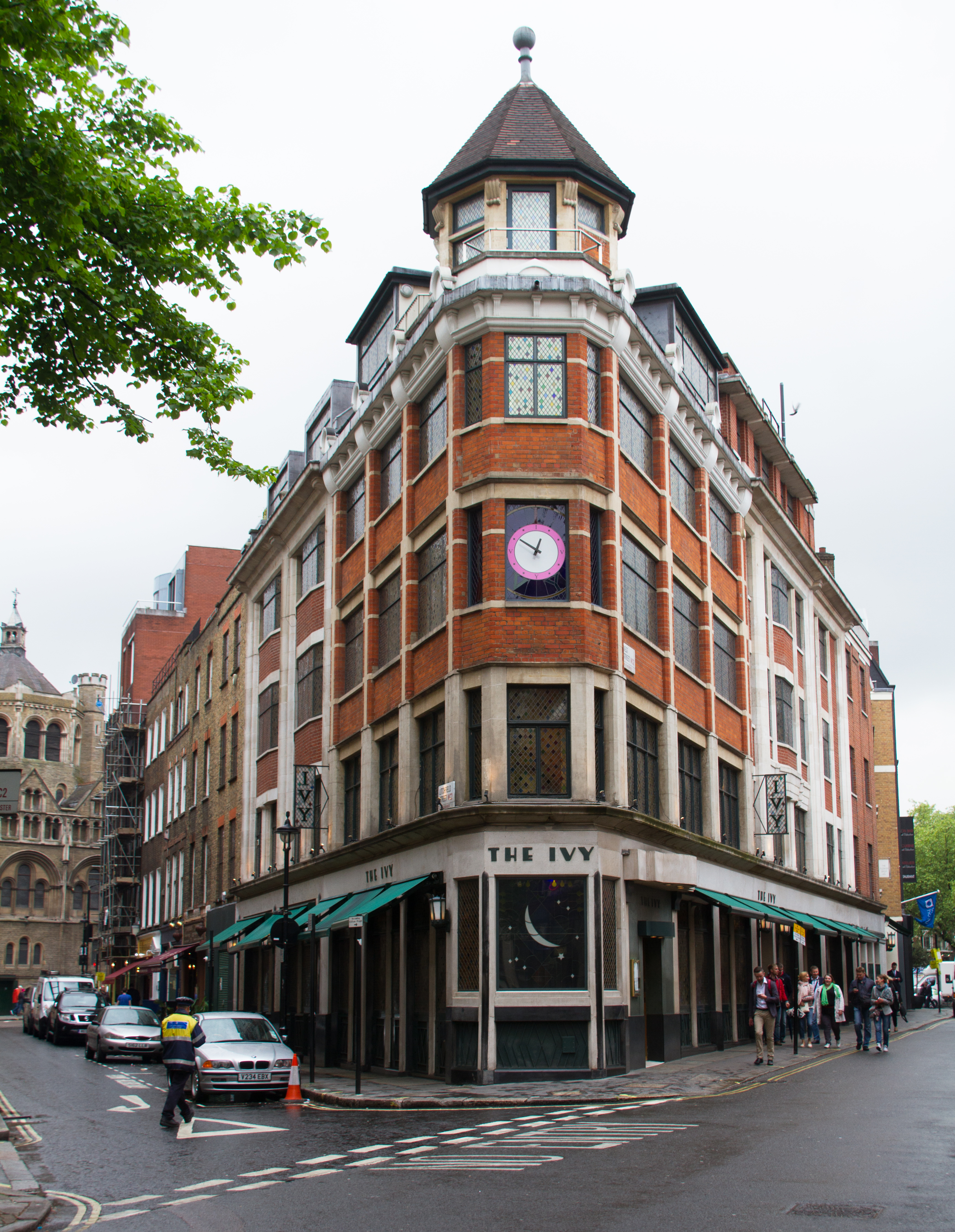
The Ivy, London, England

This is a list of notable restaurants in London, United Kingdom.

== Restaurants in London ==
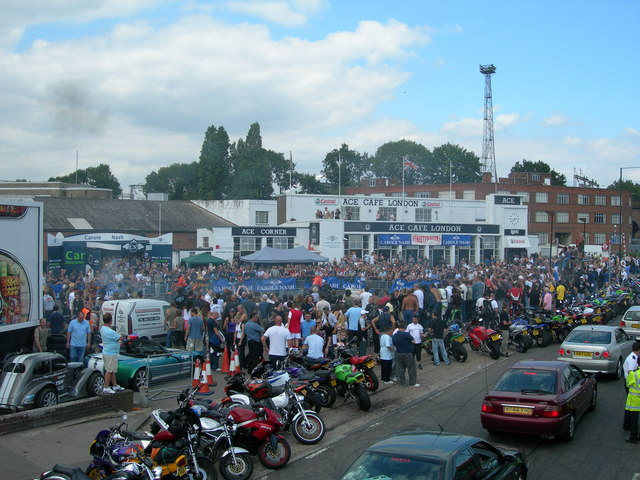
An event at the Ace Cafe London, in 2006

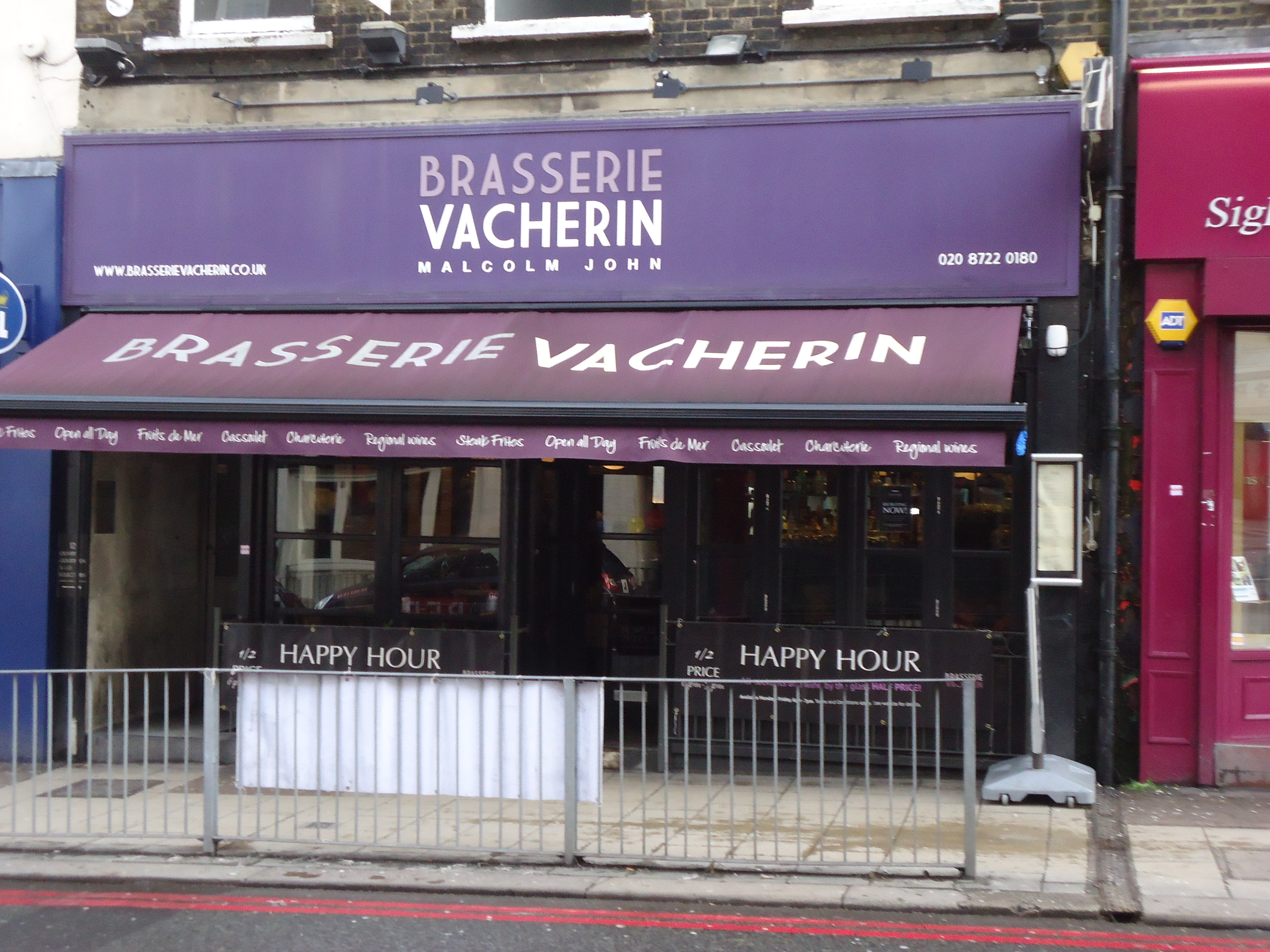
Brasserie Vacherin, Sutton High Street

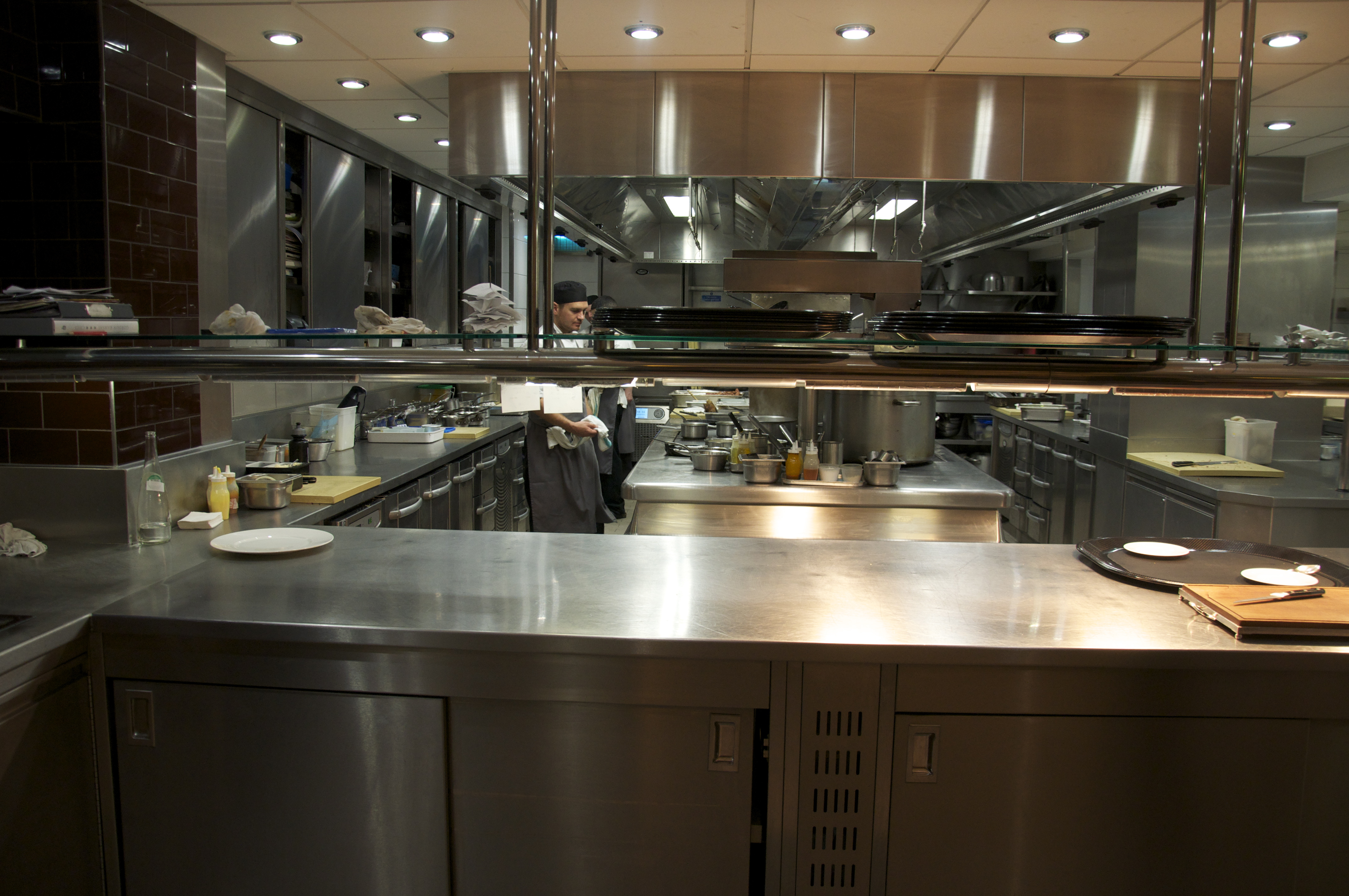
The kitchen of Pétrus, located in Knightsbridge, Central London

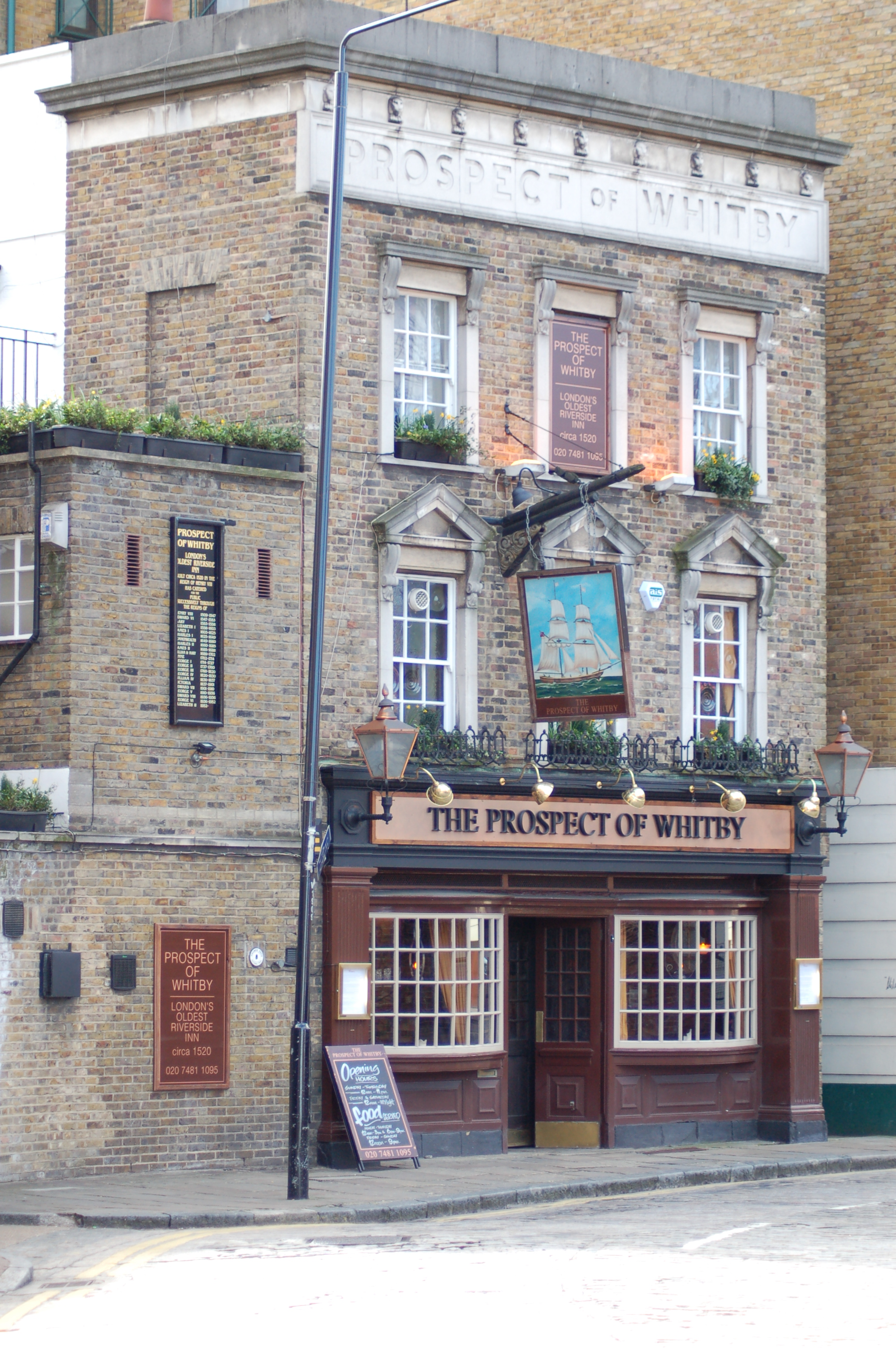
The Prospect of Whitby, 2007

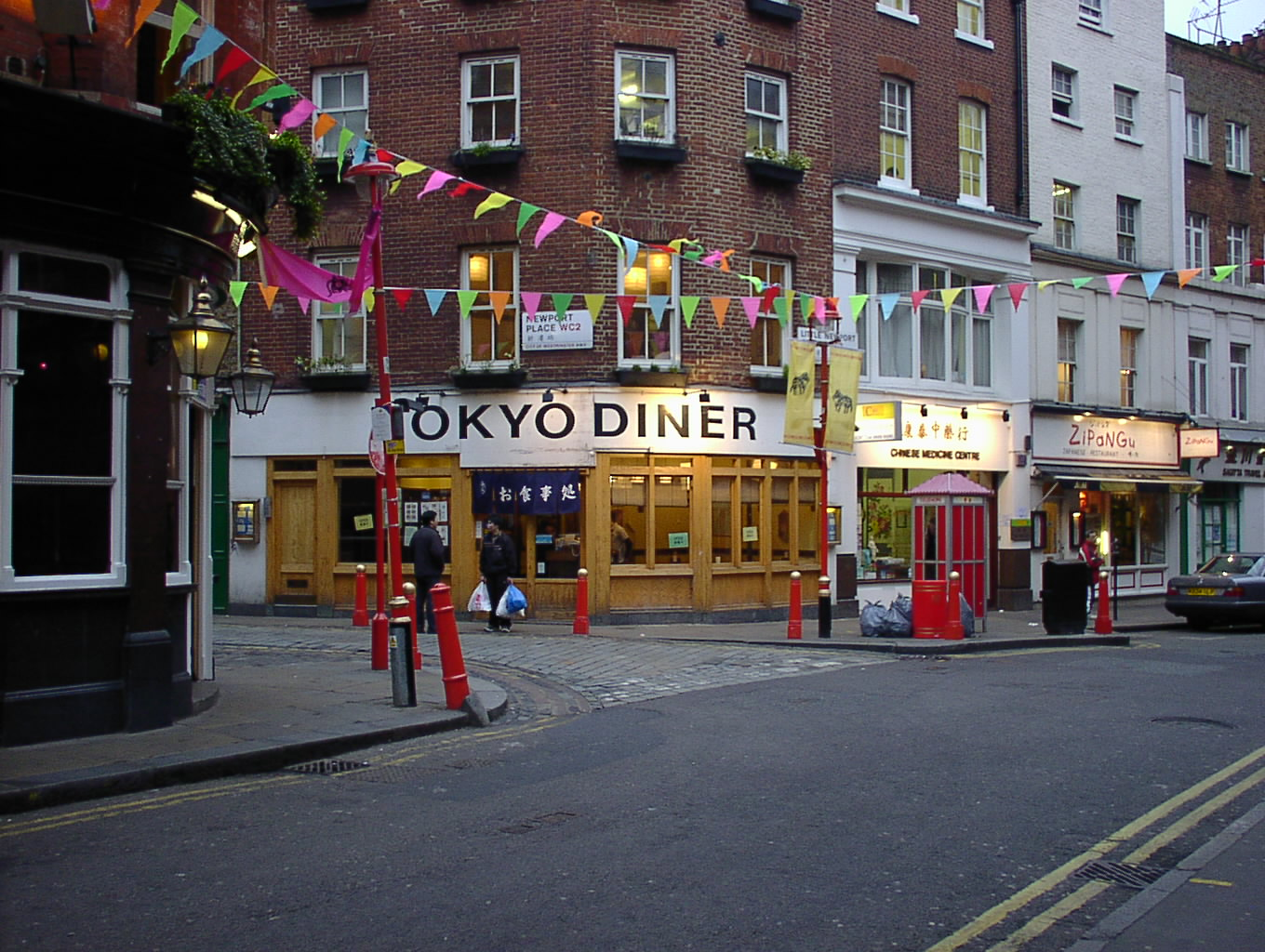
Tokyo Diner

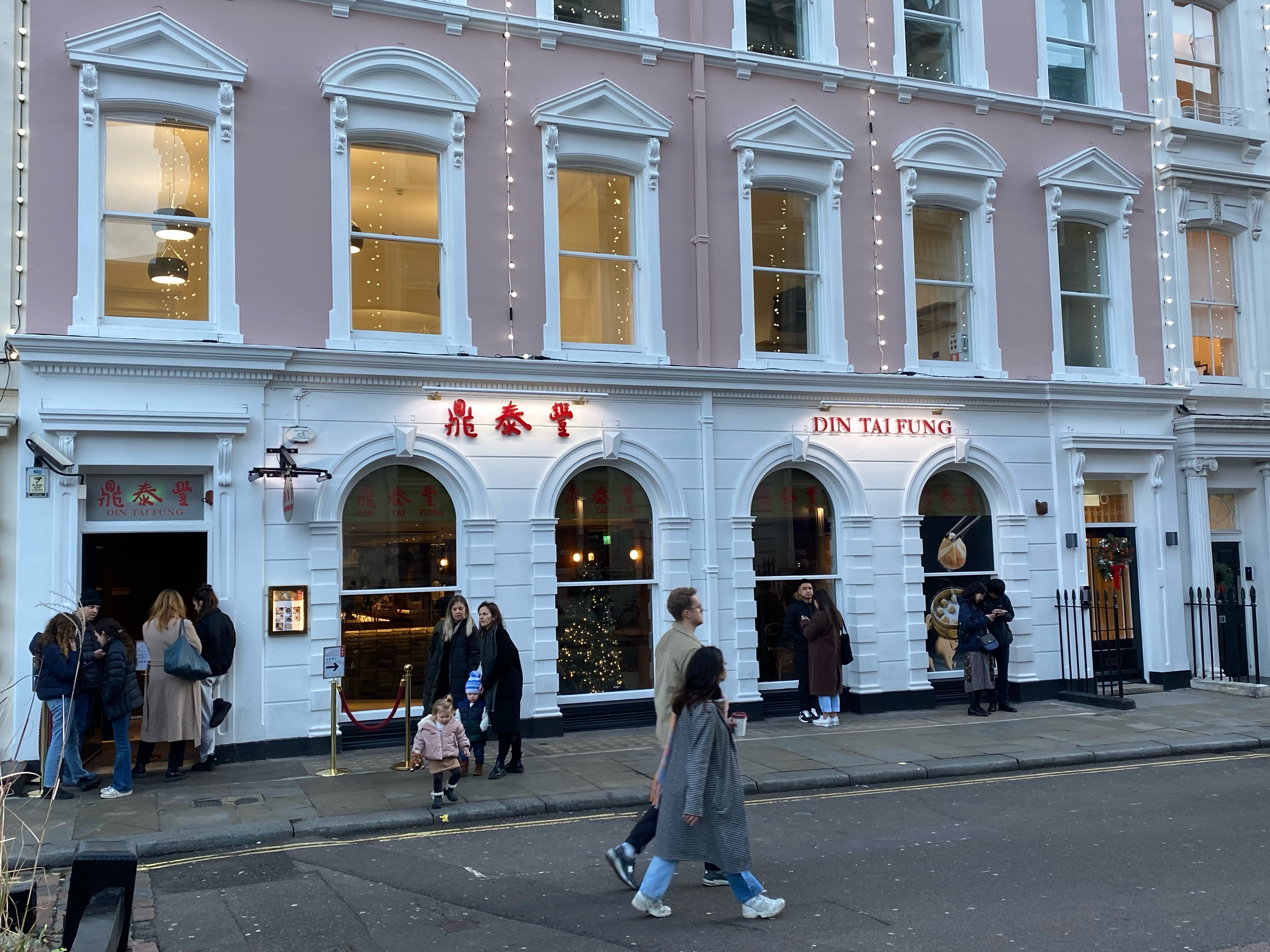
Din Tai Fung Covent Garden

=== Current ===
- 68–86 Bar and Restaurant
- A. Wong – Michelin-starred restaurant in London, England
- Aberdeen Angus Steak Houses – British restaurant chain
- Ace Cafe London – Roadside entertainment venue in North London
- Alain Ducasse at the Dorchester – Restaurant in London, England
- Bar Italia – Italian cafe on Frith Street in Soho, London
- Bel Canto
- Benihana – American Japanese cuisine restaurant company
- Bob Bob Ricard – Restaurant in London
- Café Royal – Hotel in London, former restaurant
- Casa Tua Camden
- Chez Bruce
- China Tang – Chinese restaurant in London, England
- Chutney Mary
- Cipriani S.A. – International luxury restaurant and club operator based in Luxembourg
- Club Gascon
- Colony
- The Cube
- Daquise – Polish restaurant in London
- Dinner by Heston Blumenthal – Restaurant in London, England
- Din Tai Fung – Taiwanese restaurant chain
- The Dorchester – Hotel in London
- Elystan Street – Restaurant in London, England
- L'Entrecôte – Name of several restaurant chains
- L'Escargot – French restaurant in London
- The French House, Soho – Pub and dining room at 49 Dean Street, Soho, London
- Gourmet Burger Kitchen – Restaurant chain based in Birmingham, England
- Grodzinski Bakery – Chain of kosher bakeries in London, England and Toronto, Canada
- Hakkasan – Restaurant chain
- Hard Rock Cafe – International restaurant chain
- Hawksmoor – British steakhouse and cocktail bar chain
- Itsu – British chain of East Asian-inspired restaurants
- The Ivy – British restaurant
- The Jazz Café – Music venue in Camden Town, London
- Kai Mayfair
- Kettner's Townhouse – Restaurant in London, England
- Langan's Brasserie – Restaurant in London, England
- Léon de Bruxelles – Restaurant chain
- Leon Restaurants – British restaurant chain
- Lima
- Locanda Locatelli
- Mandarin Oriental Hyde Park, London – Five-star hotel in Knightsbridge, London
- Marylebone Fire Station – Hotel and restaurant in London
- Murano
- Nando's – South African flame-grilled chicken chain
- NOPI – Mediterranean-Israeli restaurant in London, listed in the Michelin Guide
- Oblix – Restaurant in London
- Ottolenghi Islington – Restaurant in London with German, Italian, and Israeli influences
- Pétrus – Restaurant in London, England
- Pied à Terre – London restaurant
- PizzaExpress – British restaurant group
- Prospect of Whitby – Pub in London, England
- Quo Vadis – Restaurant in Dean Street, Soho, London
- Regency Café
- Restaurant Gordon Ramsay – Restaurant in London, England
- The River Café – Restaurant in London, England
- Rules
- St. John
- ScandiKitchen
- Simpson's-in-the-Strand – London restaurant
- Sketch – French restaurant in London, England
- Sofra
- Tokyo Diner – Japanese restaurant in London, England
- Tower Restaurant – Culinary school in London, England
- Town of Ramsgate – Pub in London, England
- Towpath Cafe – Cafe in Hackney, London, England
- La Trompette
- Veeraswamy – Indian restaurant in London
- Wagamama – British restaurant chain specialising in Japanese style cuisine
- The Wolseley
- Wong Kei
- Yauatcha – Chinese restaurant in London, England
- YO! Sushi – British franchised kiosk and restaurant chain
- Zafferano – Restaurant in London, England
- Zuma – International Japanese-style restaurant chain

=== Defunct ===
- Angela Hartnett at The Connaught
- L'Atelier de Joël Robuchon
- Aubergine
- L'Autre Pied
- Belgo
- Bincho – Japanese restaurant in London, England
- Bloom's restaurant
- The Capital Restaurant
- Le Caprice – Restaurant in Mayfair, London
- Cereal Killer Cafe – Chain of cafés serving branded breakfast cereals
- The Chicago Pizza Pie Factory
- Cranks – Defunct chain of English wholefood vegetarian restaurants
- Food for Thought – Vegetarian restaurant
- Fuzzy's Grub – Restaurant chain in London, England
- Gaby's Deli – Jewish restaurant
- Galvin at Windows – Defunct restaurant in London, England
- Le Gavroche – Restaurant in London, England
- The Gay Hussar – Restaurant In London, England
- Gilgamesh – Restaurant in London, United Kingdom
- Gioconda cafe
- Gordon Ramsay at Claridge's
- Grecian Coffee House
- Harveys
- Hibiscus – Restaurant in London
- Hindoostanee Coffee House
- InSpiral Lounge – London restaurant and events venue
- Isow's
- Kuo Yuan
- The Ledbury
- Lyons Corner House – British food and lodging conglomerate
- Maison Novelli – Restaurant in central London
- Mangrove restaurant – Former Caribbean restaurant in Notting Hill, London
- Mirabelle – Restaurant in England
- Mont Blanc Restaurant
- Nobu Berkeley St – Japanese restaurant in London, 2005–2020
- La Noisette
- The Nosh Bar – Restaurant in London, England
- Pall Mall Restaurant
- Pharmacy – Restaurant in London, England
- Pollen Street Social – Restaurant in London, England
- Rasoi
- Rhodes Twenty Four
- Rhodes W1
- Roussillon
- San Lorenzo – Defunct restaurant in London
- Les Saveurs de Jean-Christophe Novelli – Restaurant in London
- The Square – London fine dining restaurant
- La Tante Claire
- Titanic
- Tom Aikens
- Tom's Kitchen – English Michelin-starred chef (born 1970)
- Union Street Café

== See also ==
- List of companies based in London
- List of Michelin 3-star restaurants
- List of three Michelin starred restaurants in the United Kingdom
- List of pubs in London
- Lists of restaurants
- Restaurants in London (category)
