= Rainer Becker =

German chef and restaurateur (born 1961)

- Born: 1 May 1961 (age 64); Bernkastel-Kues, West Germany
- Citizenship: German
- Occupations: Restaurateur and chef
- Children: 2

Rainer Becker (born 1 May 1961) is a German chef and restaurateur. He is the co-founder of Azumi Restaurant Group and creator of the brands Zuma, Roka, Oblix and Inko Nito. Becker's restaurants are known for their Japanese cuisine, with flavours adapted for the Western palate.

== Early life and career ==
Rainer Becker was born and raised in Bernkastel-Kues, Germany. He began his culinary journey while he was a child, observing his mother cook meals for the family. Becker trained at the Goethehaus in Bensberg and Koenigshop in Munich.

After his training, he joined the Hyatt Hotels Corporation in Cologne where he was Chef de Cuisine. In 1992, Becker had his breakthrough when he was appointed Executive Chef of Park Hyatt Sydney. During his tenure, which spanned two years, Becker was recognized by the media earning the title of Executive Caterer of the Year. Subsequently after his time in Australia, he assumed the role of Executive Chef at the Park Hyatt Tokyo in 1994, where he oversaw the launch and operation of all the restaurants in the hotel. In 1998, Becker relocated to London where he served as the executive chef for the Hyatt Carlton Tower hotel.

In 2001, a chance meeting at a barber-shop led Becker to be introduced to investor Arjun Waney, with whom he would launch his first restaurant- Zuma. Zuma opened in Knightsbridge in the summer of 2002. Zuma was also the first restaurant outside of Japan to showcase open-fire cooking over a Robata grill. Its success led to its expansion in many cities internationally. In 2004, Becker introduced a second brand, Roka & Shochu Lounge, capitalising on the popularity of the Robata cooking. And in 2013, he also launched Oblix at The Shard. Inko Nito followed 5 years later.

In 2004, Harpers and Moet named him Chef of the Year in 2004. He was also ranked 45th in The Caterer's top 100 list of the most powerful people in hospitality in 2012.

By July 2024, Becker opened over 35 restaurants within the Azumi portfolio with locations in London, Hong Kong, Miami, Dubai, Maldives, Rome, Madrid, Capri, Bodrum, Porto Cervo, Las Vegas, Boston, New York, Bangkok, Cannes, Ibiza and Mykonos.

== Awards ==
- Best New Restaurant”, Square Meal Awards 2002
- Oriental Restaurant of the Year, Restauranteur’s
- Best Newcomer in 2003 by Guild of Chefs Awards
- Restaurant of the Year”, BMW Square Meal Awards 2003
- Restaurant of the Year “, Tatler Restaurant Awards 2005
- Top 10 Chefs and Top 100 most influential people (Rainer Becker)“, Caterer &Hotelier, Cateys-Auszeichnungen 2005
- Top 10 Chefs and Top 100 most influential people (Rainer Becker)“, Caterer und Hotelier, Catey's Awards 2006
- Winner of the Best Oriental, Best Romantic, and Best Interiors”, Time Out London's Top 50 Restaurants 2008”
- Hamburger Foodservice Preis 2011
