= Azumi Restaurant Group =

Restaurant group

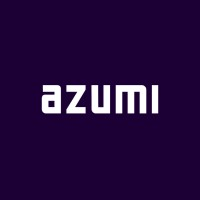
- Native name: Azumi
- Company type: Private
- Industry: Hospitality industry
- Founded: 2002
- Founder: Rainer Becker
- Headquarters: London
- Key people: Sven Koch
- Brands: Zuma, INKO NITO, Etaru, Roka, Oblix

Azumi Restaurant Group (also called "Azumi") is a London-based company which owns and operates restaurant concepts in London, Middle East, Asia and the United States.

== History ==
Azumi Restaurant Group was established by co-founders Arjun Waney and Rainer Becker. Sven Koch serves as the chief executive officer of Azumi restaurant group. Azumi began its restaurant group with the inauguration of Zuma London in 2002, subsequently followed by the inception of ROKA in 2004. Azumi expanded by introducing three additional brands: ETARU, Oblix at The Shard, and INKO NITO. Founded by Rainer Becker, in collaboration with Arjun Waney, Azumi commenced with the unveiling of Zuma London in 2002.

In 2002, Zuma made its debut in London, located near Harrods on a tranquil backstreet off the Brompton Road in Knightsbridge. Zuma has since expanded to have 15 restaurants worldwide, including various residency locations. Subsequently, in 2004, ROKA opened a branch on Charlotte Street, Oxford Street.

In 2013, Azumi launched Oblix at The Shard. In 2017, ETARU made its debut in Las Olas, launching as a neighborhood Japanese eatery.
