= L'Autre Pied =

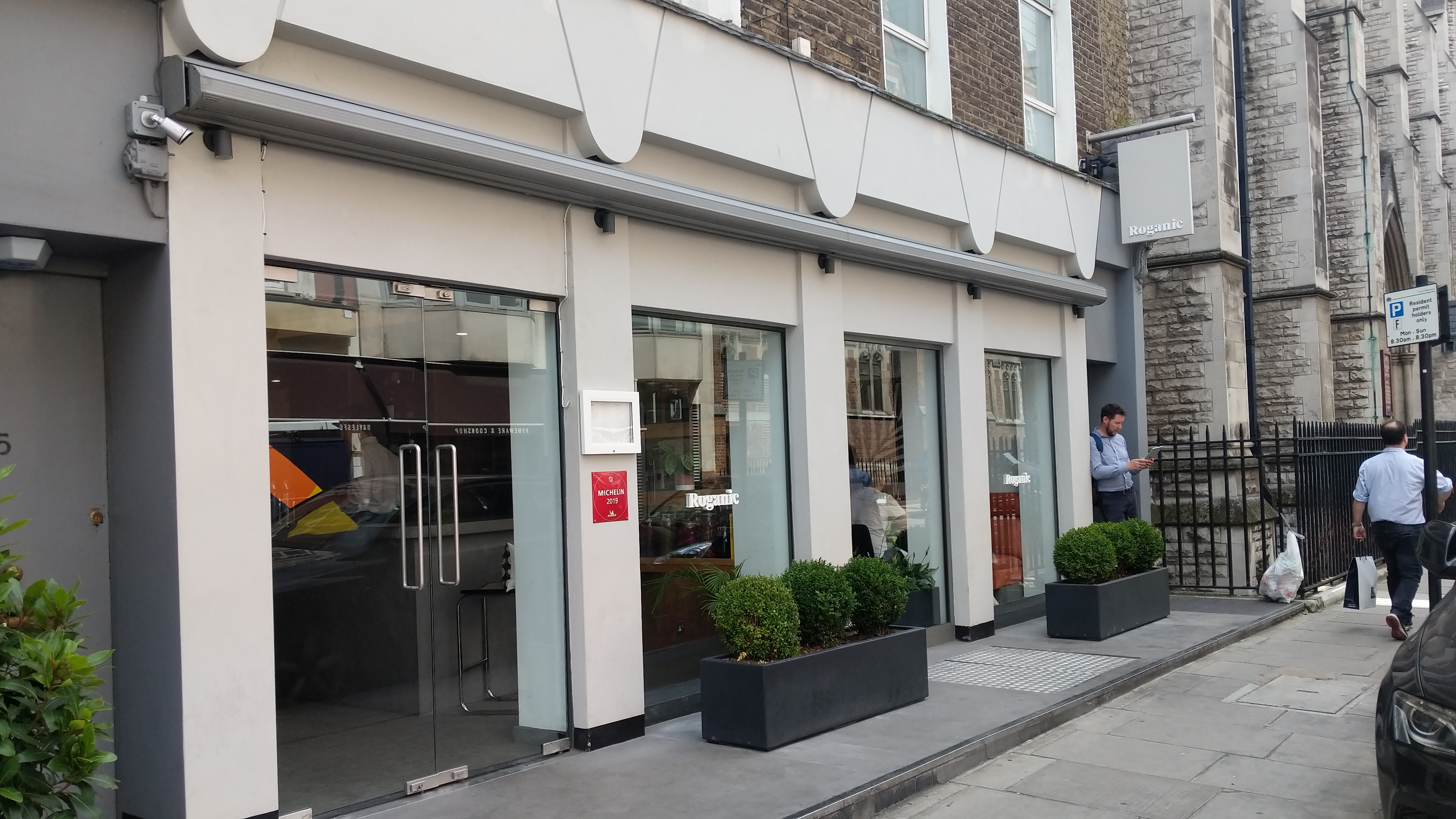
- 5-7 Blandford Street
- Interactive map of L'Autre Pied

Restaurant information
- Established: 2007 (19 years ago)
- Closed: 9 September 2017 (8 years ago)
- Food type: French cuisine
- Rating: (Michelin Guide)
- Location: Blandford St, Marylebone, London, W1U 3DB, UK
- Coordinates: 51°31′06″N 0°09′08″W
- Seating capacity: 53 (main dining room), 12 (terrace), 16 (private dining room)
- Website: lautrepied.co.uk, official website

L'Autre Pied was a Michelin one-star restaurant, situated in Marylebone, in London's West End in England, specialising in French cuisine.

== History and operations ==
The restaurant opened 1 November 2007, led by Marcus Eaves with the backing of established restaurateur David Moore of sister restaurant, Pied à Terre and pop-up restaurant Pieds Nus.

When Eaves moved across to take the head-chef role at Pied à Terre, Andy McFadden took over. McFadden continued to impress diners and critics and he landed the head-chef position in the Pied à Terre kitchen in November 2015. His successor was Graham Long, who was welcomed back after his previous experience in the Pied à Terre kitchen working under Shane Osborn.

The main restaurant seated 53 with an additional 12 seats on the terrace. A private dining room seated up to 16 people. Its total capacity was 81 people. There was also outdoor seating available for diners.

It featured prints by Richard Hamilton, Henry Moore, Gordon House and William Crozier, as well as a pencil drawing by Henri Matisse. Handcrafted tables were made by Toby Davis of Hunky Dory Designs and were a mix of Macassar Ebony, with placemats cut into the table-tops.

In January 2009, the restaurant was awarded its first star by the Michelin Guide.

The restaurant closed on 9 September 2017.

== Awards and accolades ==
- Best Newcomer BMW Square Meal Guide Spring 2008
- nominated for Best New Interior Time Out Award 2008
- Best Newcomer Time Out Award 2008
- 3 AA Rosettes
- 6/10 in Good Food Guide
- One star, Michelin Guide

== See also ==
- List of French restaurants
- List of restaurants in London
