= Kuo Yuan =

Coordinates: 51.548°N 0.236°W

- Interactive map of Kuo Yuan

Restaurant information
- Established: 1963
- Location: Willesden, London, United Kingdom

The Kuo Yuan was a Chinese restaurant on Willesden High Road, Willesden, London, England, which played an important part in the history of Chinese cuisine in the UK. In particular, it was the first restaurant in the UK to serve Pekinese dishes, including Peking Duck. Peking Duck is now served at most Chinese restaurants in the UK.

Jay Rayner of the Observer states "In 1963 the now communist Chinese Embassy once again gave the business a boost when a group of Chinese restaurateurs managed to convince the ambassador's chef, a Mr Kuo from Beijing, to defect. They set him up with his own restaurant, the Kuo Yuan in North West London, and it soon became a huge hit, not least because he was serving the first Pekinese dishes Britain had ever seen, including Peking Duck. A visit by Princess Margaret and Lord Snowdon, the Posh and Becks of their day, put both the restaurant and Chinese food on the map."

Matthew Norman, writing in the Guardian, claims to have heard a radio programme which explained that the Kuo Yuan was "subsidised a restaurant in Willesden as part of some cultural initiative".

== See also ==
- List of Chinese restaurants
- List of restaurants in London
