= Roka (restaurant chain) =

Restaurant chain

ROKA

Restaurant information
- Established: 2004
- Food type: Japanese Robatayaki
- Rating: 4.5
- Location: London

Roka is a global restaurant specializing in Robatayaki cuisine, owned by restaurateur Rainer Becker.

== History ==
Roka uses a dining concept where food and beverages are served around the robata grill, which is known for its flaming theatrics. Established in 2004 by Rainer Becker, Roka's flagship restaurant was inaugurated on Charlotte Street in London following the success of Zuma. The restaurant is listed in the Michelin guide.

Its flagship restaurant was opened in Charlotte Street, London after its success with Zuma. Between 2009 to, Roka expanded with two more locations in London at Mayfair and Aldwych. In 2020, Roka expanded to Dubai, which is its first international location. The offer the same modern approach to Japanese cuisine. Subsequently it opened another branch in Riyadh. After opening another branch in Riyadh, ROKA expanded to Jeddah with a visually attracted location in Cascade at Jeddah Walk. In 2021, Roka launched another branch in the Cap Vermell Grand Hotel, Mallorca. It also expanded to Galaport, Istanbul and The Avenues in Kuwait in 2022.

In 2024, Roka was named the Best Japanese restaurant in Jeddah at the Time Out Jeddah Restaurants Awards.
