= Mirabelle (London restaurant) =

Restaurant in England

Coordinates: 51°30′27″N 0°8′43″W

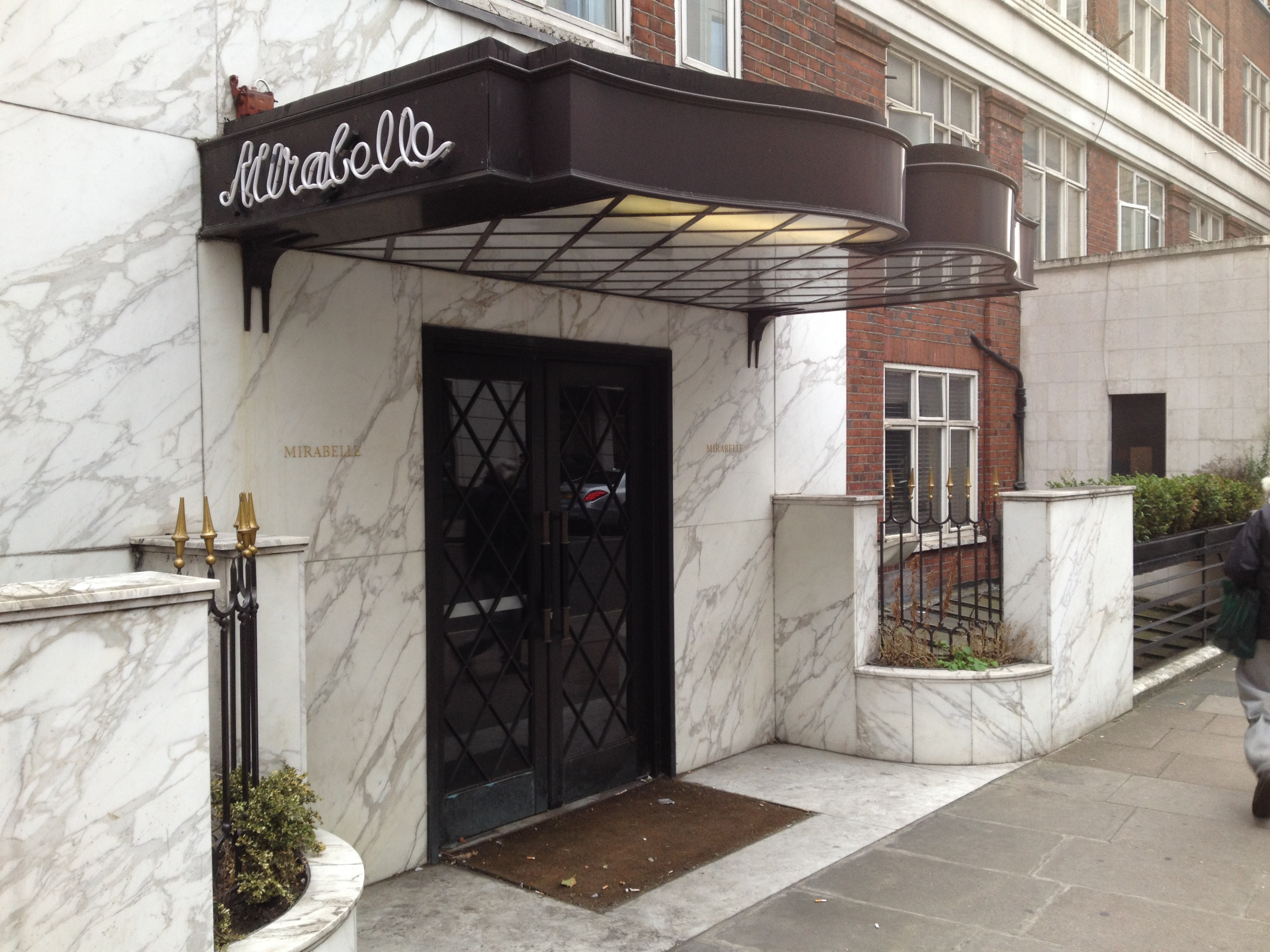
- The exterior of Mirabelle in 2014
- Interactive map of Mirabelle

Restaurant information
- Chef: Marco Pierre White (1998–2007); Charlie Rushton (2008)
- Food type: European/French
- Rating: (2000–08)
- Location: 56 Curzon Street, London, W1, United Kingdom

Mirabelle was a restaurant in the Mayfair area of London. It opened in 1936, and became popular during the 1950s and 1960s, with some celebrities being regulars. Chef Marco Pierre White owned it from 1998 to 2007, and it earned a Michelin star in 2000 under head chef Charlie Rushton, and kept it until its closure for refurbishment in 2008. It remained closed until the site was demolished in 2016/17.

== History ==
The restaurant was first opened in 1936. It was established as an integral part of the facilities of a newly-constructed eight-storey block of luxury flats occupying the sites of the former numbers 56 to 60 Curzon Street, and 23 to 26 Bolton Street. In March 1938, it was stated in Country Life that: "The Restaurant, which is available both to residents and non-residents is considered to be among the daintiest and cosiest in London". its proprietor at this time was an Austrian, Ferdinand Kasnar, and the restaurant was described in the press as having an "Austrian atmosphere".

The interior had a single main dining room, and two private dining rooms, the Pine Room and the Chinese Room. The restaurant was in the basement. Guests entered at street level and went downstairs. The restaurant became popular following the Second World War, and in the 1950s and 1960s it was seen as the place to be. Regulars of the restaurant included Orson Welles and Winston Churchill. The restaurant was also used to entertain foreign guests of the British Government, such as in February 1962 when Lord Privy Seal Edward Heath dined with the Assistant Foreign Secretary of Yugoslavia.

In 1957, the chef and staff of Mirabelle relocated to Paris for a week to promote English food in the French capital. This also involved the temporary overturning of a ban on the importation of English oysters so that a thousand of them from Colchester could be sent for the Mirabelle staff to use there. Other dishes served in Paris included devilled kidneys and silverside of beef served with dumplings.

In 1988, the Brent Walker leisure group attempted to buy the restaurant for £3 million in order to convert it partially into a casino. The purchase was made, but the owner of the group George Alfred Walker could not get a casino licence for the premises after his criminal history was publicly revealed. In 1990, the restaurant was purchased by a Japanese billionaire, who renovated it. Mirabelle reopened with a main dining room serving a French Menu and Japanese menu in two tepanyaki room, with an impressive wine list of the best French wines designed by Steven Spurrier. The restaurant never became popular despite the hire of London's best PR agency.

The mansion block in which the restaurant was situated was demolished in 2016/17.

=== Marco Pierre White ===
Marco Pierre White purchased Mirabelle and re-opened the restaurant in 1998. One of his changes was to install a disco ball as he thought it was romantic, with the overall design created by designer David Collins. Collins had previously worked with White on the interior design of Harveys, and at other restaurants including revamping La Tante Claire on two occasions. His decorations included Venetian glass and leather embellishments. Paintings by Pierre Le-Tan were commissioned, and added to drawings by Eugene Berman and ceramics by Pablo Picasso. The designs were later described by food critics as something out of a "1920s liner". The restoration was filmed for the Channel 5 show Waiting for Marco.

When Tim Zagat, founder of the Zagat restaurant guide, attempted to dine at the restaurant, he was ejected from the premises by White. Zagat had given a poor review of one of White's other restaurants, Titanic. White retired from the kitchens of all of his restaurants in 1999, handing back Michelin stars they had earned. Under head chef Charlie Rushton it earned a Michelin star in 2000, however the chef left shortly afterwards and was replaced by Martin Caws, who had been sous chef under White at the Oak Room.

Whilst White and his girlfriend Matilde Conejero were dining with Michael Winner at the restaurant in 2000, Winner asked why White hadn't yet had thoughts of marriage. The meal ended with White and Conejero having agreed to get married, although White later admitted that it wasn't exactly a proposal. They had already had two children, and would later have a daughter named Mirabelle. Shortly after celebrating his 40th birthday party at the restaurant in April 2002, White quit as Director amid reports that the establishment was somewhere in the region of £10 million in debt. An auction of a number of bottles of wine from the restaurant was conducted in 2002, expected to raise around £200,000 at Sotheby's, although it was denied that the intention was to raise money to pay off the restaurant's debts.

The restaurant hit the press again when a waiter refused to replace a bottle of Penfolds Grange Hermitage 1964 for actor Russell Crowe who said that it was corked. Eventually the waiter relented and replaced the £3,500 bottle, for Crowe and his guest, Connie Nielsen. Other Hollywood actors dined at the restaurant whilst it was owned by White, including Johnny Depp who ate there with partner Vanessa Paradis and spent £17,000 which included £11,000 for a single bottle of Romanée-Conti burgundy, and Leonardo DiCaprio who was not recognised by White when the actor thanked the chef for "the best meal I've ever had". Kylie Minogue was photographed outside the restaurant in 2002.

The Mirabelle was sold by White in 2007 as one of three restaurants sold to Stephen Schaffe and Joseph Ettedgui, as they were no longer making a profit. The duo planned to re-open the restaurant once more, and keep it in the same location. They announced in January 2008 that the restaurant would re-open with a 1930s design, but that the six-month refurbishment would result in some fifty staff members being laid off. However, it was later announced that the restaurant would not open until late 2010.

=== Menu ===
Dishes served at Mirabelle under Marco Pierre White were of French cuisine, including various tarte tatins, soufflés and sea bass served with fennel and mashed potato. When White took over the restaurant in 1997, he reviewed the historical menus in order to find inspiration for a revamped range and found that not a great deal had changed on the menu since the 1950s. For instance, a borscht soup called "Barszcz a la Cracovienne" had been on the menu for over twenty years. Previous hors d'oeuvres served in the era before White's influence include ham from either Bayonne or York, crab with avocado, potted shrimp, escargot, and grapefruit. White's newer menu was documented when he wrote The Mirabelle Cookbook, published by Ebury Publishing in 1999, and certain dishes were published in the national press to promote the restaurant.

=== Legacy ===
Whilst under White a number of future celebrity chefs were trained, including Australian Curtis Stone who was also involved in the production of The Mirabelle Cookbook. Other chefs to have worked with White there include British television chef Richard Phillips.

Chefs that worked at Mirabelle before White included Alberto Crisci. Other famous chefs at Mirabelle were royal chef Antony Jacobs, he opened a little upscale restaurant based on the Mirabelle menu, this was called Bastille. The Mirabelle cookbook features impossible to copy recipes from Robbie Robinson. Robinson was so secretive he would hide his skills from all other personnel at Mirabelle.

The Mirabelle was bought in 1961 by the DeVere group which also owned the Grand Hotel Eastbourne where they created a sister restaurant, also called Mirabelle, which as of 2015 continues as the hotel's fine dining restaurant. However, the Eastbourne restaurant is rather different to the London restaurant's 1998-2008 incarnation as the two were then no longer under common ownership and had no links other than the name. However the Eastbourne restaurant, which has its own separate entrance at the hotel, uses an external blue neon sign like the one familiar to visitors to the London restaurant.

== Reception ==
Caroline Stacey ate at Mirabelle in 1998 after Marco Pierre White took it over. She described the cooking as "timeless" with certain courses "unforgettable" and that the main courses were "stellar". She didn't think that the dessert options were as good as the rest of the menu however, but selected the restaurant as one of her favourites she had visited that year. Deborah Ross ate at the Mirabelle for The Spectator in May 2000, describing the food as "brilliant". She was pleased with the presentation of certain dishes, including the salmon terrine which appeared to be a sandcastle and a starter of asparagus with hollandaise sauce which she described as a "sweet little bundle like one of those dried-flower arrangements you can buy in National Trust shops".

Victoria Moore, who wrote a piece on the yorkshire pudding for The Guardian in 2000, described how she was disappointed by the version offered by Mirabelle. It was firstly delivered alongside the rest of the course, and not served ahead of the dish as in Yorkshire tradition and then thought that it had been made richer in order to make it "more appealing to toffs".

By 2006, critic Bryan Appleyard felt that the restaurant had been taken over by the hedge fund industry and had turned into little more than a staff canteen for them, and thought that the service he received at the restaurant was "appalling" as he was not one of them.

=== Awards and ratings ===
In 1999, it was named London's best new restaurant. Whilst under White's ownership, it was first awarded a Michelin star in the 2000 list under the Executive Chef of Charlie Rushton, which it retained until its closure in 2008.

In 2007, the restaurant publicly received a poor rating of its hygiene standards, being given only one star out of five by environmental health inspectors. This score was summarised as "A poor level of compliance with food safety legislation. Much more effort required."

== See also ==
- List of restaurants in London
