= Nobu Berkeley St =

Japanese restaurant in London, 2005–2020

- Interactive map of Nobu Berkeley St

Restaurant information
- Established: 2005 (21 years ago)
- Closed: 2020 (6 years ago)
- Food type: Japanese
- Location: 15 Berkeley Street, London, England, U.K.
- Coordinates: 51.5084°N 0.1434°W

Nobu Berkeley St was a restaurant located in the Mayfair district of London, England, opened in 2005.

== History and operations ==
The interior was designed by interior decorator David Collins with lighting by Isometrix.

The restaurant previously held one star in the Michelin Guide, however, this star was removed in the 2015 Guide. The restaurant was part – and was the first – of the international Nobu Restaurant group.

Nobu Berkeley St closed in 2020, with its staff moving to the Nobu Hotel in Portman Square.

== See also ==
- List of Japanese restaurants
- List of restaurants in London
