= Fuzzy's Grub =

Restaurant chain in London, England

Coordinates: 51.5140°N 0.1081°W

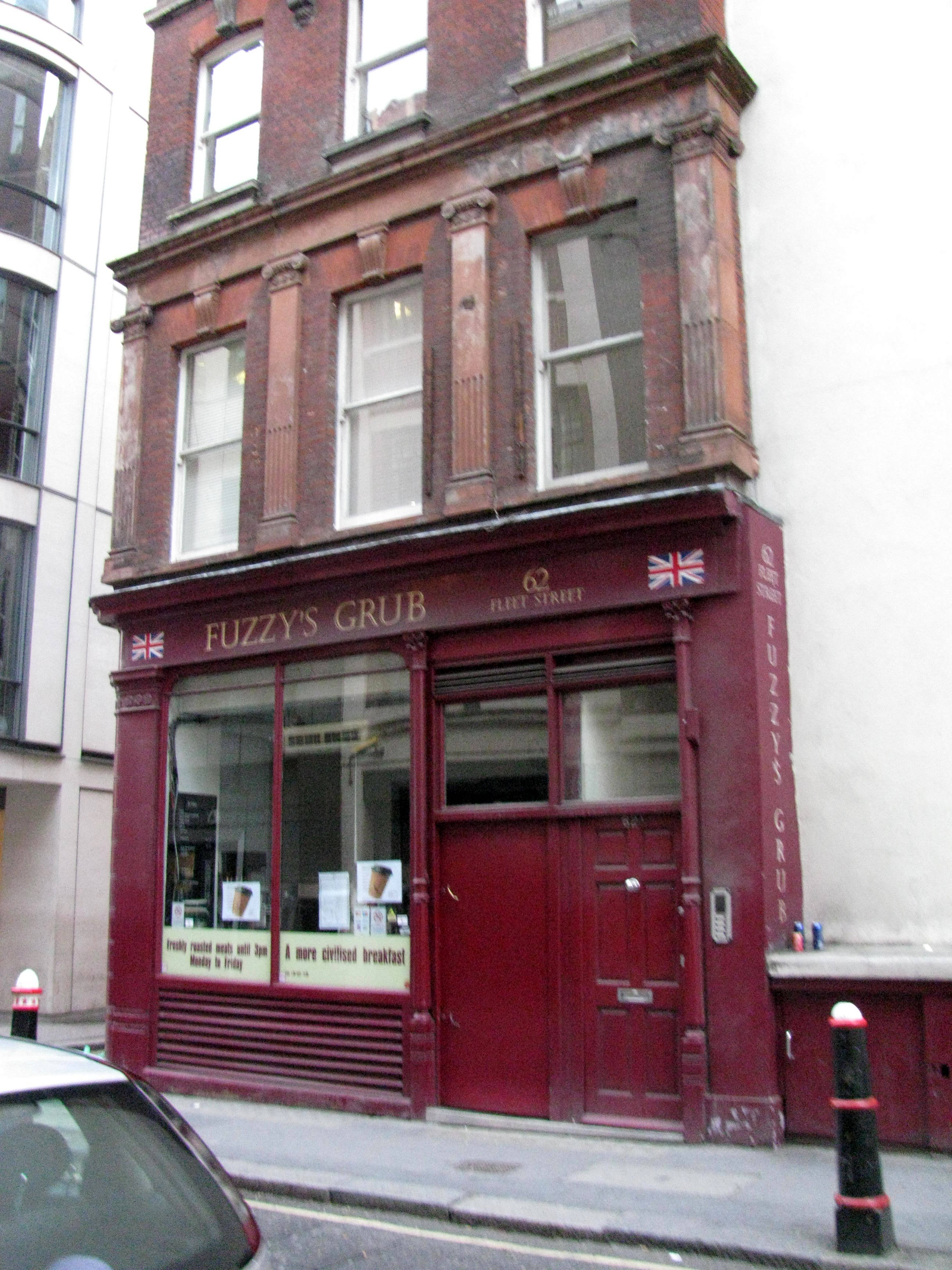
- A branch at 62 Fleet Street, in 2011
- Interactive map of Fuzzy's Grub

Restaurant information
- Established: 10 October 2002
- Closed: 22 December 2009
- Previous owners: Fazila Collins, Georgina Laing
- Food type: Fast food
- Location: 62 Fleet Street, London, England

Fuzzy's Grub was a restaurant chain located in London, England. It opened its first Fuzzy's in Fleet Street in 2002 and was set up by Fazila Collins and Georgina Laing, also known by the nicknames Fuzzy and Grub.

The chain was primarily a takeaway restaurant specialising in roast dinners, which were served either in box containers or as a sandwich (between thick slices of bread). The roast dinner sandwiches contained everything that was provided in the boxes, including peas and gravy.

In 2008, Fuzzy's was in danger of administration. and the chain was dissolved later in 2008.

As of December 2017 there is one restaurant using the Fuzzy's Grub name, in Houndsditch, London, England. This restaurant has no connection to the former chain.

== See also ==
- List of restaurants in London
