= David Collins (interior designer) =

Irish architect (1955–2013)

- Born: 1 March 1955; Dublin, Ireland
- Died: 17 July 2013 (aged 58); London, England
- Education: Bolton Street School of Architecture
- Occupation: Interior designer

David Collins (1 March 1955 – 17 July 2013) was an Irish architect who specialised in designing the interiors of bars and restaurants in London.

== Biography ==
=== Early life ===
David Collins was born in south Dublin, Ireland on 1 March 1955.His father, John Edward, was an architect, and David claimed his love of line and space came from his father, while his mother, Helen, inspired his sensitivity to colours and materials. He studied architecture at the Bolton Street School of Architecture in Dublin.

=== Career ===
He established the David Collins Studio, an interior design firm based in London, in 1985. One of his first interior designs was chef Pierre Koffmann's La Tante Claire in Chelsea. He then designed chef Marco Pierre White's (now defunct) Harvey's Harveys (restaurant) in 1988. Later, he designed The Gilbert Scott, chef Marcus Wareing's restaurant at the St Pancras Renaissance Hotel. Another Wareing restaurant that he designed was the Blue Bar in Belgravia. He went on to design The Wolseley, the Delaunay Hotel, J Sheekey, Brasserie Zédel, Colbert, Gordon Ramsay at Royal Hospital Road, and Nobu Berkeley St. He also designed retail interiors for Jimmy Choo, Alexander McQueen and Harrods.

Additionally, he designed The Charles, an apartment building on the Upper East Side in New York City. He was a close friend of Madonna: he designed her London and New York apartments and she used a poem that he wrote as the basis of her 1998 song "Drowned World/Substitute for Love", for which he received a co-writing credit.

=== Influence ===
David Collins's design and aesthetic has had a huge impact, which was part of what led him to be named to the 2012 AD100 list. Simon Mills of Wallpaper* magazine said that "It is no exaggeration to say that the restaurant and hotel revolution in London of the last two decades would not have been the same without him."

=== Death ===
Collins died in London on 17 July 2013 from melanoma only three weeks after being diagnosed.

== Legacy ==
A book that Collins had been working on was published posthumously in May 2014 and the Studio celebrated its 35th anniversary in 2020.
