= Bob Payton =

Marketing man, restaurateur and hotelier

- At Stapleford Park
- Born: Robert Michael Payton; 25 May 1944; Miami, Florida, United States
- Died: 13 July 1994 (aged 50); Stevenage, Hertfordshire, England
- Education: University of North Carolina at Chapel Hill; Northwestern University
- Occupations: Marketing man, restaurateur and hotelier

Robert Michael Payton (25 May 1944 – 13 July 1994) was an American marketing man, restaurateur and hotelier. He is known for starting a chain of American-style restaurants in London in the 1970s, starting with The Chicago Pizza Pie Factory.

Payton was born in Miami, Florida. He attended the University of North Carolina at Chapel Hill, in Chapel Hill, North Carolina, and later received a master's degree in business administration from Northwestern University in Evanston, Illinois.

When sent to England by J. Walter Thompson to promote Kraft products, he decided to stay. He opened several successful fast food outlets such as Chicago Pizza Pie Factories and a series of themed restaurants such as Rib Shacks, Chicago Meatpackers and Henry J. Bean's. In 1988 he bought Stapleford Park, a large Leicestershire country house, and converted it into a hotel.

== Death ==
He died at age 50, in an automobile accident near Stevenage, Hertfordshire, England.

== See also ==
- List of people from Miami, Florida
- List of people who died in road accidents
