= The Charles =

Residential skyscraper in Manhattan, New York

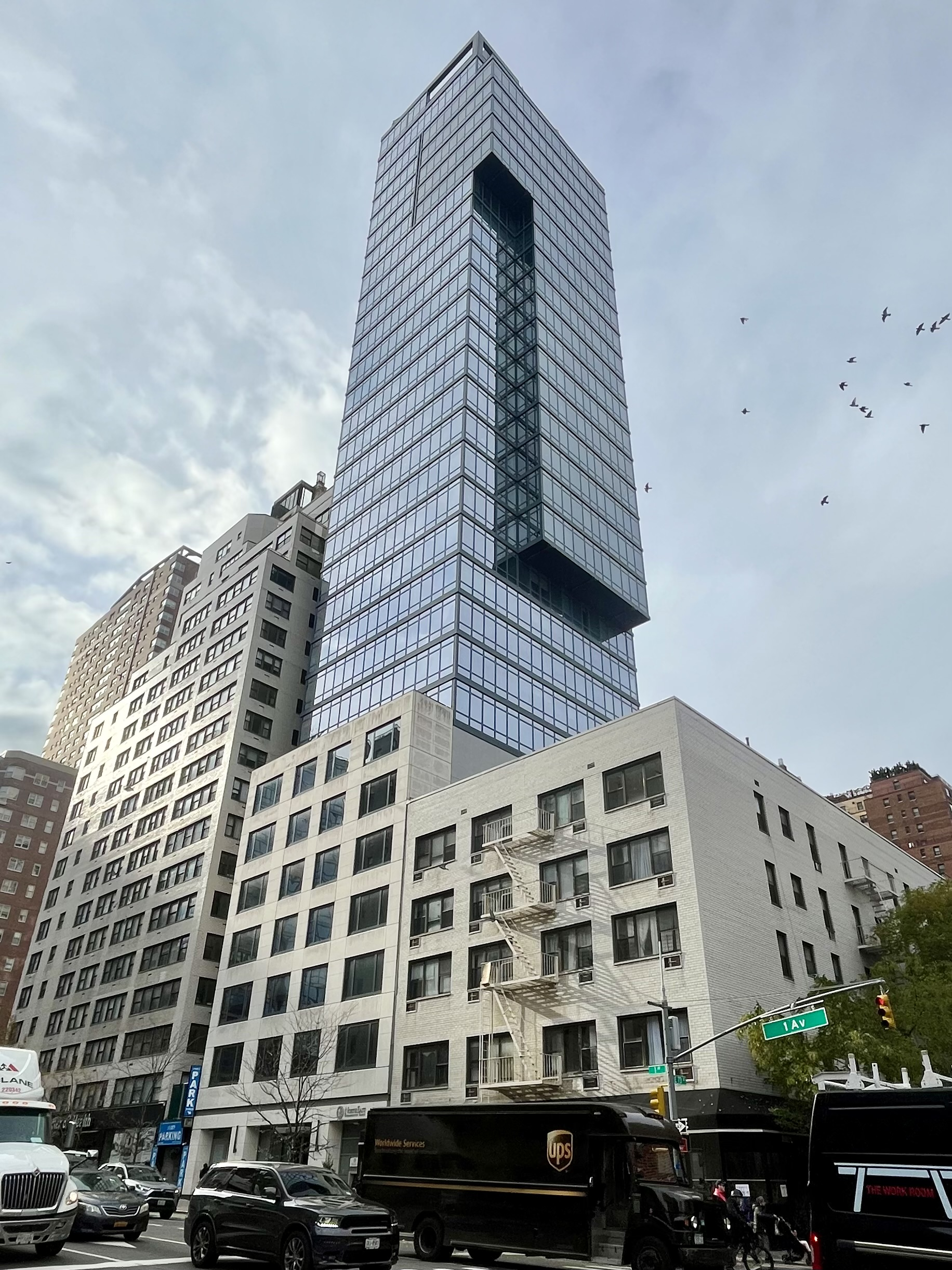
- The Charles in 2023
- Interactive map of the The Charles area

General information
- Location: 1353-1355 1st Avenue, Upper East Side, Manhattan, New York City
- Coordinates: 40°46′6″N 73°57′21″W
- Construction started: 2013

Design and construction
- Architect: Ismael Levya

The Charles is a building at 1353-1355 First Avenue on the Upper East Side of Manhattan in New York City.

In 2007, R. Ramin Kamfar, the chief executive of Bluerock Real Estate, purchased the land for development. A high-rise building with thirty-three floors was scheduled for construction. However, the project was postponed due to the Great Recession. Construction began again in February 2013, with only thirty-one floors. It is developed by Bluerock Real Estate, in conjunction with Victor Homes.

The building is a 121.31-metre-high (398.0 ft) structure. It is designed in the modernist architectural style by Ismael Levya. The facade is light blue. It is a residential building, with twenty-eight full-floor condominiums. The interior design is David Collins.
