= Madame Jojo's =

Nightclub and cabaret venue in England

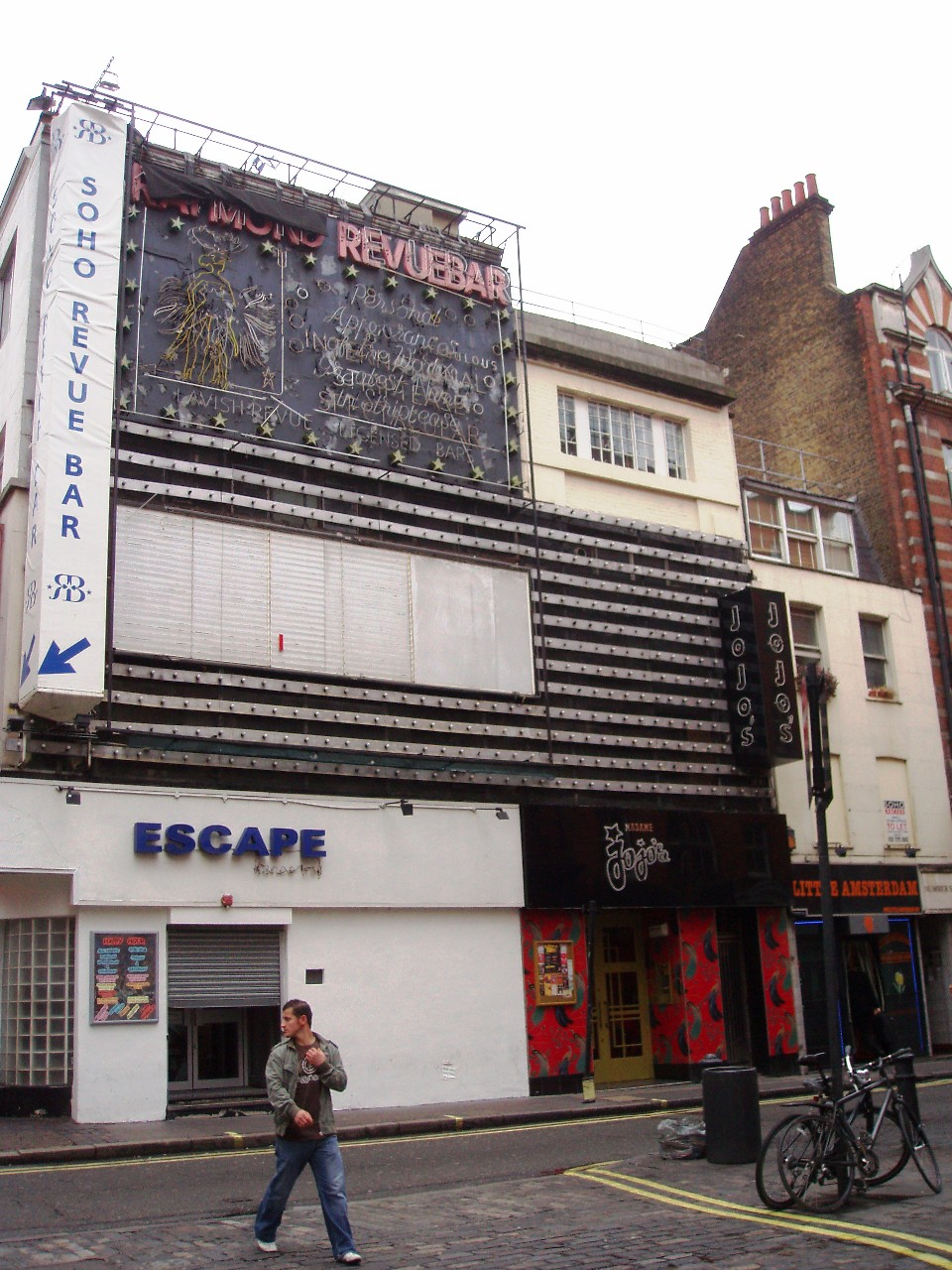
- The on street view of Madame Jojo's in 2008
- Interactive map of Madame Jojo's
- Location: 8-10 Brewer Street, Soho; London, W1F; United Kingdom
- Coordinates: 51°30′44.7″N 0°8′1.8″W
- Owner: Paul Raymond (1986 - 2008); Soho Estates (2008 - present)

Construction
- Opened: 1986
- Closed: November 2014

Madame Jojo's was a nightclub and venue for cabaret, burlesque, drag shows, and live music located on Brewer Street in the Soho area of the City of Westminster in the West End of London.

It was opened in 1986 by Paul Raymond. It closed in November 2014 due to its licence being revoked. After a new license was granted in December 2019, in July 2022 it was reported that the club would reopen in "spring 2023", however this failed to happen. In December 2024 local news outlets reported that an American company had applied for a license to open a two-floor strip club in the nightclub's former premises.

Supporters of the club believed the decision to close the venue permanently was influenced by the local council's negative attitude toward the older, late-licence venues in the area and a desire to curb some of that nightlife.

== History ==
The building the nightclub is in was previously, from the late 1930s to the early 1970s, the basement bar Jack of Hearts, with restaurant Isow's upstairs. After that closed it was an adult movie theatre for a period.

Madame Jojo's was opened in 1986 by magazine publisher and stripclub owner Paul Raymond. The club was named after drag performer Madame Jojo. She compèred the club until leaving in 1991. Raymond obtained an injunction to prevent the use of the stage name, so from then on she was billed as just Jojo.

Jojo presided over a group of drag cabaret performers called The Barbettes, named after a character from The Blood of a Poet, who originally performed at the bar six nights a week.

The club quickly became popular with parts of London's gay and trans communities.

In 1995 a Drag King night and regular contest started being held at Madame Jojo's. The night was originally named Club Naive, then changed to Club Geezer.

The club was used to shoot a scene in Stanley Kubrick’s 1999 film, Eyes Wide Shut.

Indie club night and music promoters White Heat started at Jojo's on Tuesdays in 2005, they put on early concerts there for artists such as Lorde, Jamie T, The XX, and Adele.

After Raymond's death in 2008 ownership was left to his grandchildren who manage the property under the company name of Soho Estates.

== Closure ==
It closed in November 2014, after its licence was revoked. This was due to a bouncer having been accused of pulling out baseball bats to attack a group throwing glass bottles outside of the venue, although he was later cleared of assault.

Upon its closure a campaign to 'Save Soho' was launched by Tim Arnold, with participation from Stephen Fry and Benedict Cumberbatch, among others.

The Guardian reported shortly after the closure that plans that had been submitted to Westminster council by Soho Estates in September 2013, and approved by the council in the December of that year, showed the venue was among several buildings owned by the company in Walker's Court and Brewer Street that were intended to be demolished and redeveloped. Soho Estates has said it "always intended to re-open the venue as" Madame Jojo's.

After a new licence was granted in December 2019, and following a renovation of the whole building, it was reported in July 2022 that the club would reopen in "spring 2023" in a venture run by Simon Hammerstein, the grandson of the renowned Hollywood composer Oscar Hammerstein, however this failed to happen with no explanation reported. In December 2024 local news outlets reported that Soho Prime Entertainment Ltd, owned by American company John Kirkendoll Management, had applied for a sexual entertainment venue licence to open a two-floor strip club in the nightclub's former premises. The licence was approved on 27 February 2025 by Westminster council's licensing sub-committee.
