= Bincho =

Japanese restaurant in London, England

Bincho Yakitori
- Type: Private
- Industry: Restaurant
- Founded: July 2007; 19 years ago
- Founder: David Miney
- Defunct: July 2014; 12 years ago
- Headquarters: London, UK
- Number of locations: OXO Tower; Soho; Exmouth Market
- Key people: Hidenori Ohata; Malcolm Simpson
- Services: Japanese Izakaya-style dining
- Owner: David Miney; Dominic Ford; Ronnie Truss

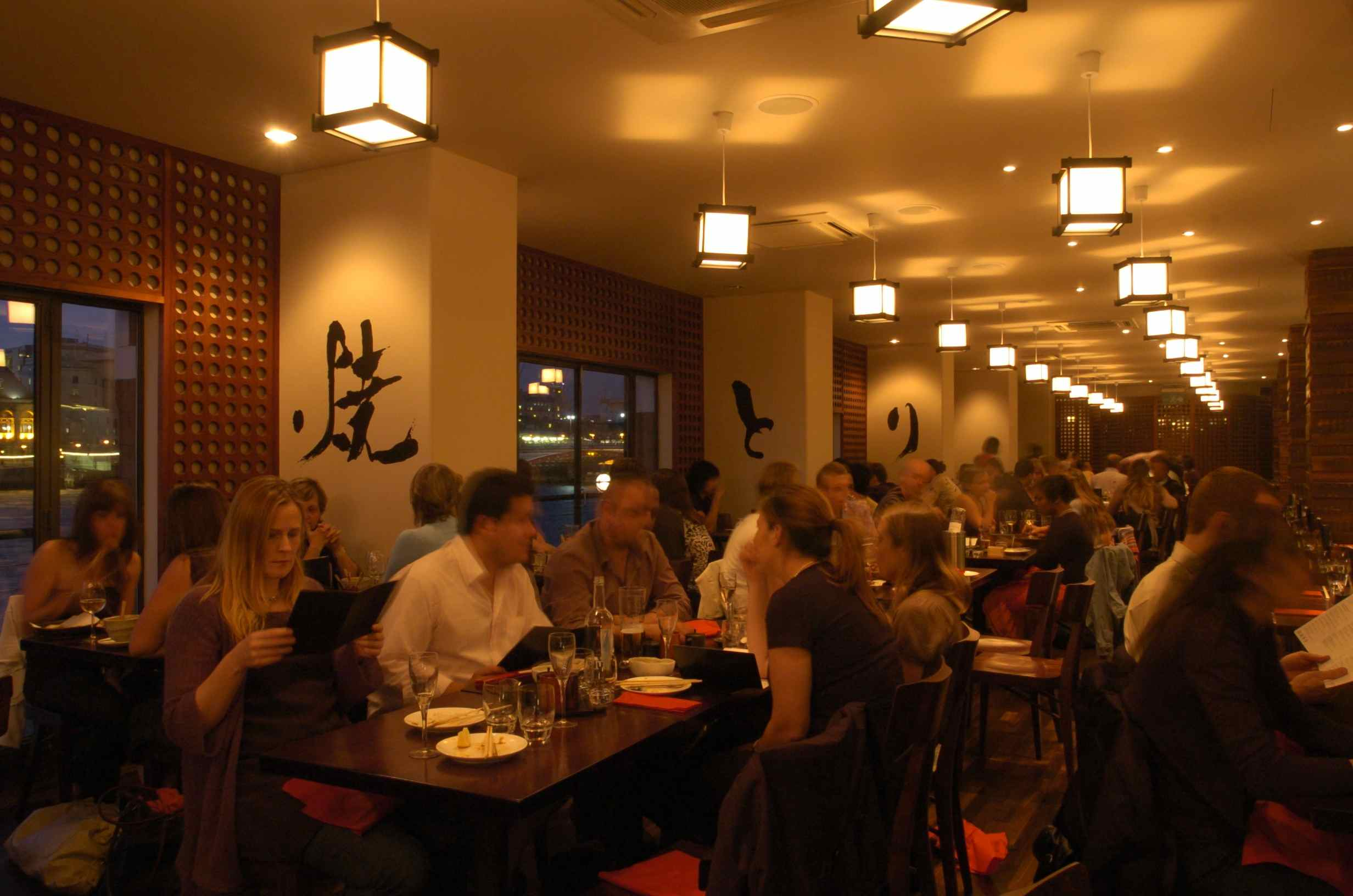
Bincho in the OXO Tower

Bincho, also known as Bincho Yakitori, was a London-based Japanese restaurant styled on the traditional izakayas found throughout Japan. Yakitori, literally translated as "grilled bird", is prepared on skewers and cooked over dense coals known as Bincho-tan made from oak.

== History ==
David Miney, formerly of OXO Tower Restaurant and Rick Stein, had the idea of opening an izakaya in London whilst he was living in Tokyo in the late 1990s. Miney spent several years delving into the dingy late night izakaya scene, usually the traditional haunt of drunken salarymen and young Japanese hostesses. In 2007 he teamed up with Dominic Ford opened the flagship Bincho Yakitori at OXO Tower near Blackfriars on the banks of the River Thames. Experienced Yakitori Chef and Bincho Head Chef Hidenori Ohata was brought over from Japan in 2009 to help with the menu and expansion of the Bincho chain. Malcolm Simpson, originally from Australia who had been working in Tokyo restaurants for many years, was also brought over from Japan to manage the expanding chain. The restaurant has been resurrected in Brighton on a smaller scale by David Miney.

== Awards and reputation ==
- UK The Daily Telegraph newspaper review
- UK The Guardian Jay Rayner review
- UK Sunday Times AA Gill review

== Locations ==
=== London/OXO Tower ===
Bincho OXO has a massive open-floor plan and seats around 140 covers. Opening in 2007, their OXO Tower flagship restaurant closed in early 2008.

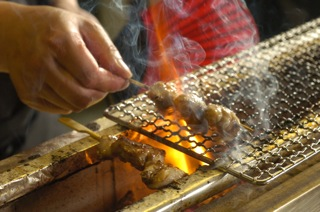

=== London/Soho ===
Opening in 2008, Bincho opened a second location in the heart of London's theatre-land on Old Compton Street in Soho.

=== Brighton ===
Opening in 2016, after the London restaurants closed, David Miney resurrected the concept in Brighton in Preston Street. It has become a feature of the Brighton food scene winning several awards.

== See also ==
- List of Japanese restaurants
- List of restaurants in London
