= Tokyo Diner =

Japanese restaurant in London, England

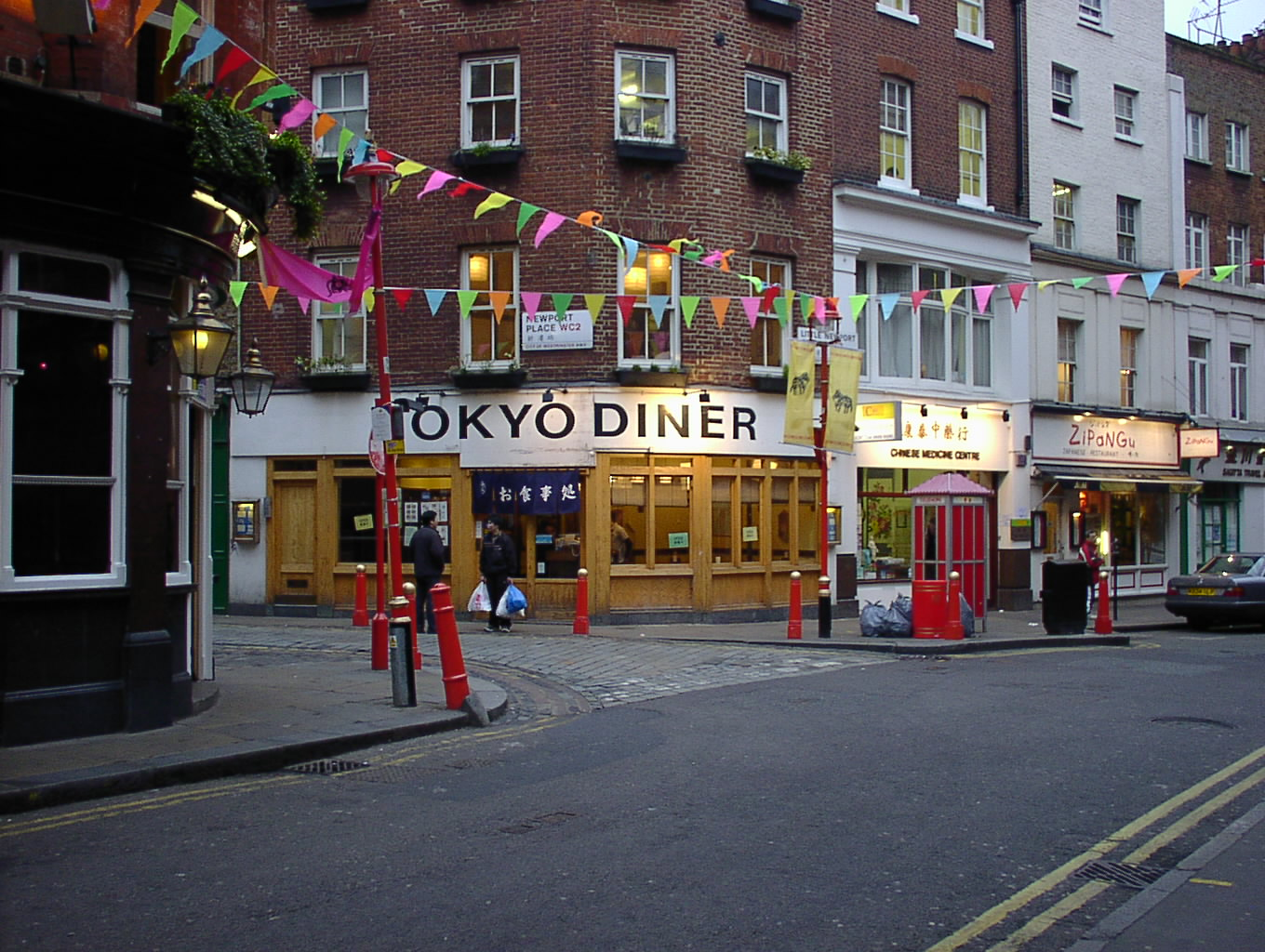

- Location within Central London

Restaurant information
- Established: 1992; 34 years ago
- Owner: Richard Hills
- Food type: Japanese
- Location: 2 Newport Place, London, WC2H 7JP, United Kingdom
- Coordinates: 51.51184°N 0.12934°W
- Seating capacity: 101
- Reservations: No
- Other information: Nearest station: Leicester Square
- Website: www.tokyodiner.com

Tokyo Diner is a three-floor Japanese restaurant on the corner of Newport Place and Lisle Street in Chinatown, London. The restaurant opened to the public in December 1992.

== History ==
In 1987, Richard Hills began taking Japanese evening classes, where he became interested in Japanese culture, considering it fascinating and beguiling. (Note: "Its language is as rewarding as it is challenging, and its people are charming, warm and enthusiastic. Their encouragement got me over the hardest part of learning the language.") Two years later, he went to Japan to learn more about its culture.

When he returned to London, having known the delights of cheap, cheerful eateries in Japan, he transformed the vacant launderette below his own flat into Tokyo Diner and opened in December 1992. As the proprietor, he stated, "it seems that my conviction proved right, because we went into profit within the first month of trading and, despite numerous competitors opening (and closing), we have never been short of customers."

== Policies ==
Tokyo Diner has the policy of using sustainable sources for its service ever since its opening in 1992. According to the staff members of Tokyo Diner, to extend awareness of the need to reduce the consumption of tuna, the restaurant will not serve tuna-based food. (Note: Tuna is a vital food source for Japanese cuisine. Because of its importance, this led to serious over-fishing of tuna. According to the restaurant's staff members, its success has certainly been responsible for spreading the popularity of raw fish, yet customers have consistently told them that they do not want to be the cause of the extinction of tuna.)

Another policy is the non-acceptance of tips. According to the menu, any money left on tables (regardless of the intention of the owners) will go to St. Martin-in-the-Fields’ charity for the homeless. (Note: According to its menu, tipping is not part of the culture in Japan, where paying extra for service is a foreign concept.)

== See also ==
- List of Japanese restaurants
- List of restaurants in London
