= Kettner's Townhouse =

Restaurant in London, England

Coordinates: 51.5131°N 0.1306°W

- Interactive map of Kettner's Townhouse

Restaurant information
- Established: 1867
- Previous owner: Auguste Kettner
- Location: 29 Romilly St, London, United Kingdom, W1D 5AL

Kettner's Townhouse is a restaurant in London. Dating from 1867, it is one of the oldest restaurants in the city.

== History ==
Kettner's Townhouse was founded in 1867 by Auguste Kettner, a German chef who served Napoleon III. It is the first restaurant to serve French food in London.

The restaurant drew small crowds until a letter was published in The Times acclaiming the restaurant's cooking in 1879. However, it was the visits of the Prince of Wales, Albert Edward – also known as King Edward VII – around 1890 that really began to attract large crowds to the restaurant. King Edward is believed to have taken his mistress, actress Lilie Langtry to Kettner's. There are rumors that he courted Lillie Langtry through a secret tunnel that connected the restaurant to The Palace Theatre where the actress performed. Since then, the restaurant developed a risque reputation as a place for affairs.

Margaret Thatcher, Winston Churchill, Bing Crosby, Agatha Christie and Oscar Wilde frequented the place.
