= The Chicago Pizza Pie Factory =

Restaurant information
- Food type: Pizza
- Location: United Kingdom

The Chicago Pizza Pie Factory was a chain of pizza restaurants. The chain originated in Crown Passage (off Pall Mall) as The Chicago Pizza Pie Factory and was started by entrepreneur Bob Payton in 1976–7. The London establishment also had a bar. This was the start of a series of restaurants forming the My Kinda Town chain. The chain opened restaurants in places such as Paris, Barcelona, Buenos Aires, and Tel Aviv, where they operated successfully for several decades.

When Payton sold the company in 1990 the business was pulling in a turnover of £35m.

Payton himself died just a few years later (1994) after being involved in a car crash near Stevenage, north of London.
