= The Nosh Bar =

Restaurant in London, England

Coordinates: 51.5112°N 0.1343°W

- Interactive map of The Nosh Bar

Restaurant information
- Established: 1944
- Closed: September 2012
- Food type: Salt beef, Jewish cuisine
- Location: 42 Great Windmill Street (1944–late 1980s); 39 Great Windmill Street (2008–2012), London, United Kingdom

The Nosh Bar was a salt beef bar at 42 Great Windmill Street, London, for over forty years, opening in 1944 and finally closing in the late 1980s. It re-opened in 2008 at 39 Great Windmill Street after an absence of almost 20 years, and closed again in September 2012.

== History ==
The Nosh Bar opened in 1944 and formed an important part of the Soho community during the post war years. It served traditional Jewish fare, including among other things, speciality chicken soups, salt beef on rye bread, new green pickles, hot potato latkas, Jewish cheesecake, and traditional lemon tea for over forty years.

It is still remembered fondly by many people, including renowned food critic AA Gill. Who said of it "the other thing my deja vu took me back to was the Nosh Bar on Windmill Street, which sold fantastic pastrami on rye with Dutch pickles and lemon tea. It was staffed by ancient rude men with sad eyes and brilliantined hair, who wore white coats. The walls had posters for old East End boxers. It was heaven... and it’s gone, along with all edible Jewish food in London."

The Nosh Bar was frequented by many boxers as well as boxing managers and promoters, owing to its proximity to Jack Solomon's Gym in nearby Ham Yard and it was a favourite of the showgirls from the Windmill Theatre.
