= Isow's =

Coordinates: 51°30′44.7″N 0°8′1.8″W

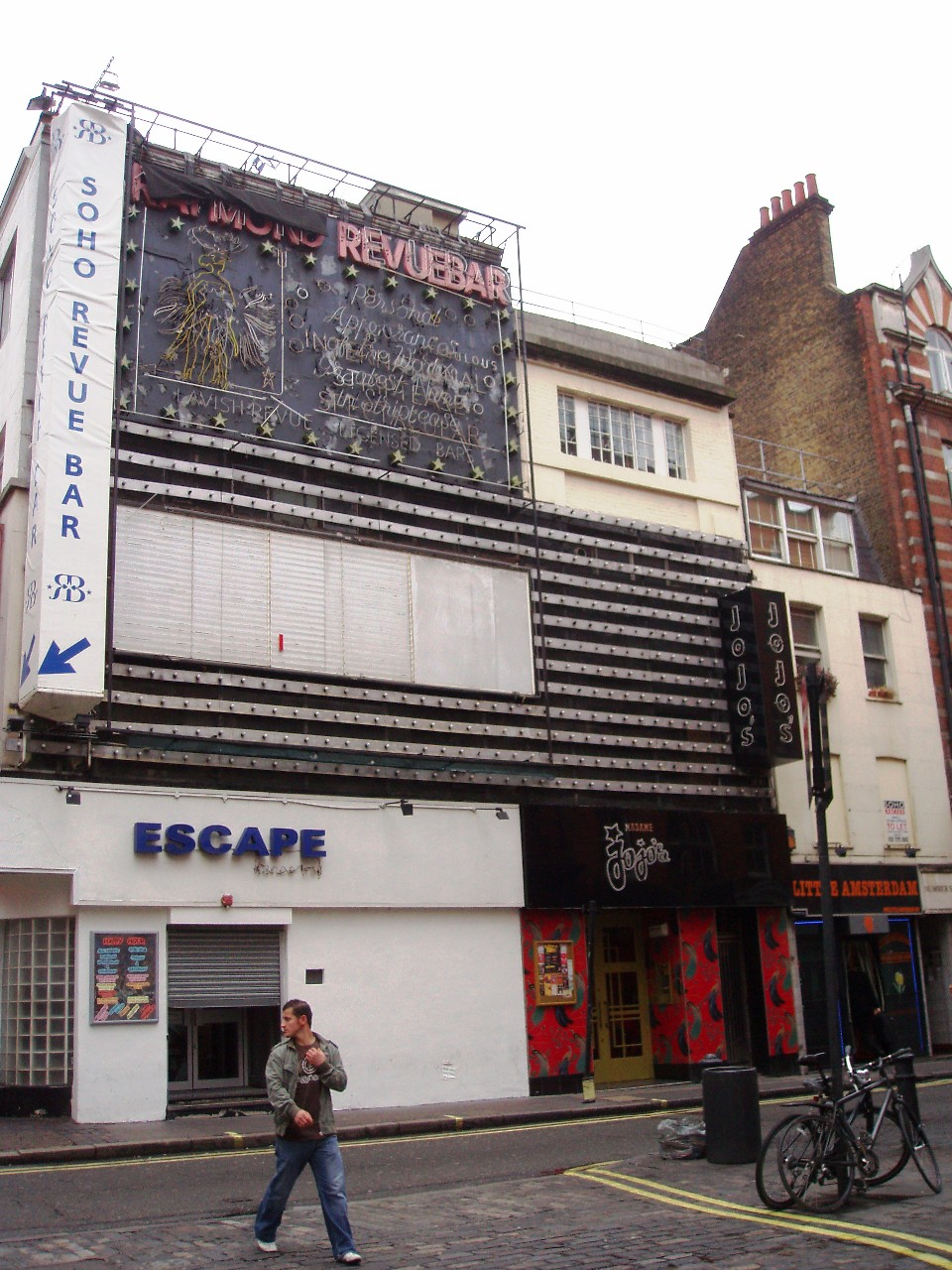
- The site of Isow's restaurant in Brewer Street, now Madame Jojo's
- Interactive map of Isow's

Restaurant information
- Established: 1938
- Closed: 1972
- Previous owners: Jack Isow; Norman Isow
- Location: 8–10 Brewer Street, Soho, London, United Kingdom

Isow's was a restaurant based at 8–10 Brewer Street, Soho, London, England. A popular misconception is that it was a kosher restaurant; it was not, but it did serve several Jewish dishes alongside its regular menu.

The restaurant was owned by Jack Isow and, when he died, it was passed on to his son, Norman; a popular venue for the entertainment industry. In 1969, Jack Isow married actress Sheree Winton. Regular celebrity patrons would have their names embossed in gold on the back of red chairs; they included Danny Kaye, Walt Disney, Frank Sinatra, Jack Solomons, Cyd Charisse, Rod Steiger, Judy Garland and Bette Davis.

The restaurant occupied the ground floor of the building. The basement housed the 'Jack Of Clubs' nightclub, named after Jack Isow. During WW2 the restaurant organised a Passover Seder meal for Jewish Canadian troops waiting to go into action on D-day.

Angelo Dundee was a regular patron of Isow's, and held there a press conference with Muhammad Ali.

Cabaret venue and nightclub Madame Jojo's now occupies the site where Isow's stood.
