= Towpath Cafe =

Cafe in Hackney, London, England

Towpath
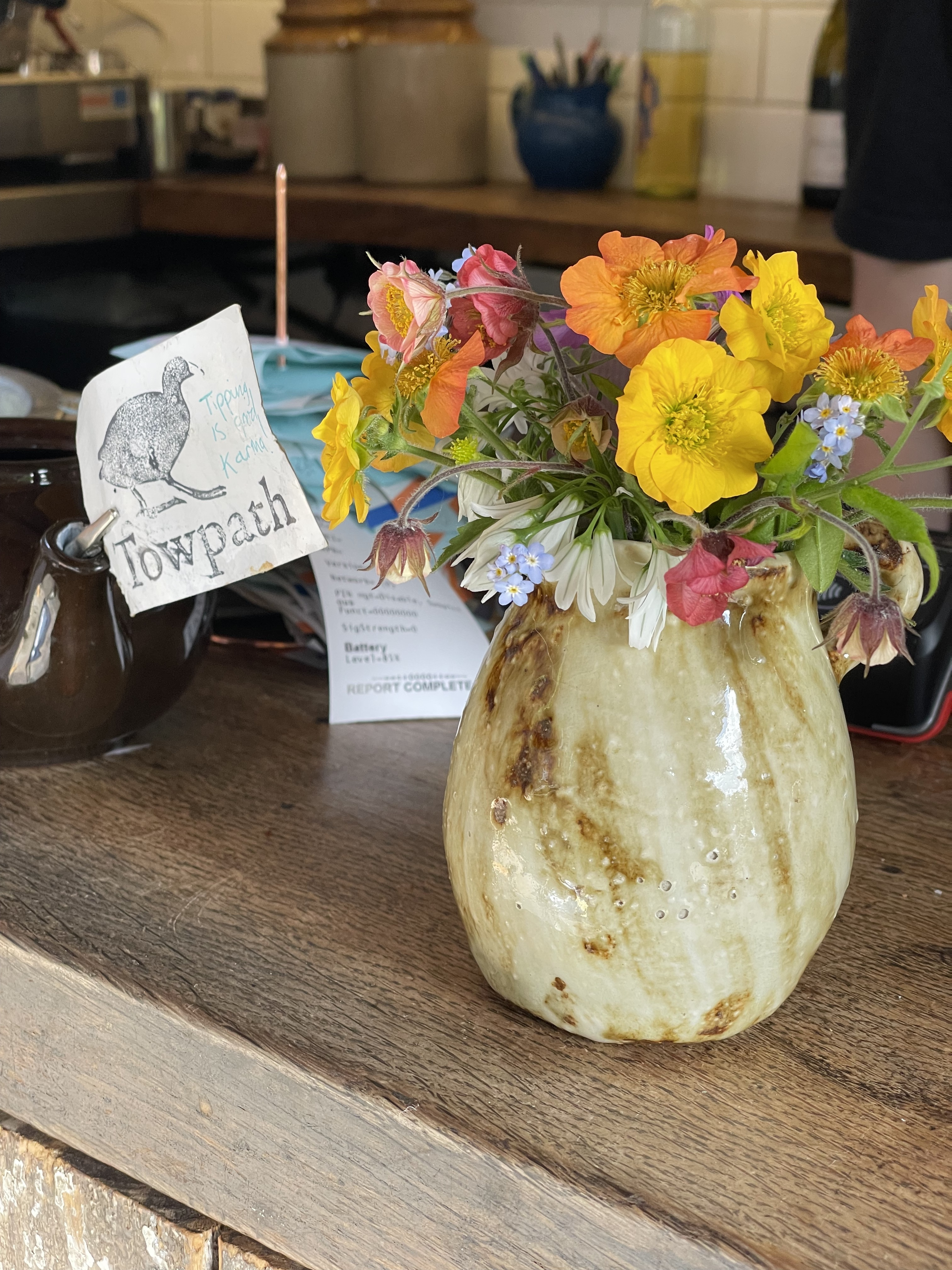
- Towpath Cafe, May 2023
- Interactive map of Towpath

Restaurant information
- Established: 2010
- Owners: Laura Jackson & Lori de Mori
- Location: 42 De Beauvoir Crescent, London, N1 5SB, United Kingdom
- Reservations: No reservations
- Website: www.towpathlondon.com

Towpath Cafe is a seasonal cafe located on Regent's Canal in De Beauvoir Town, London, England. It is open March through November, and offers visitors casual dining on the canal walkway.

== Location ==
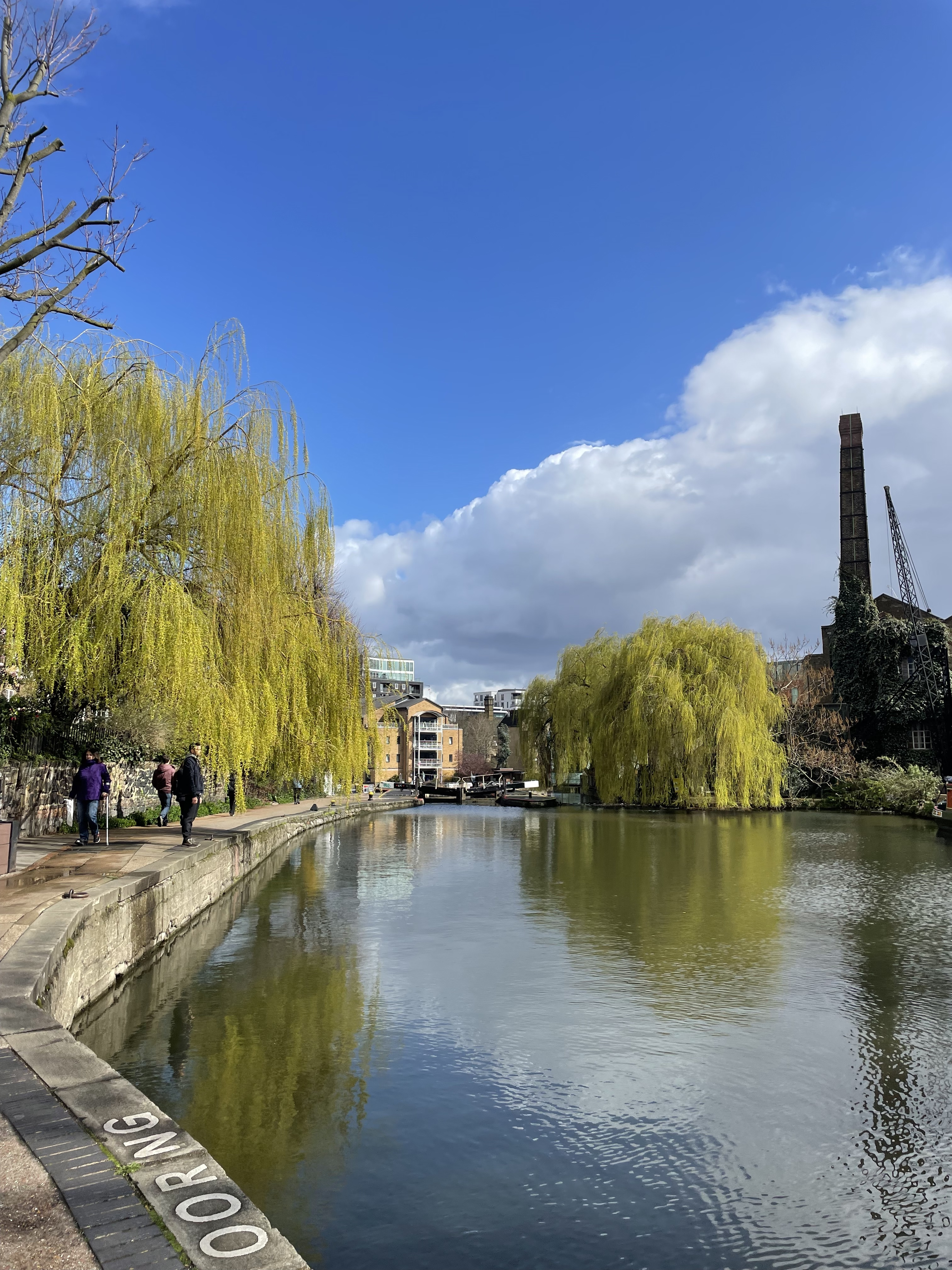
City Road Lock, Islington, London

The path along the canal is called a towpath, hence the name of the cafe.

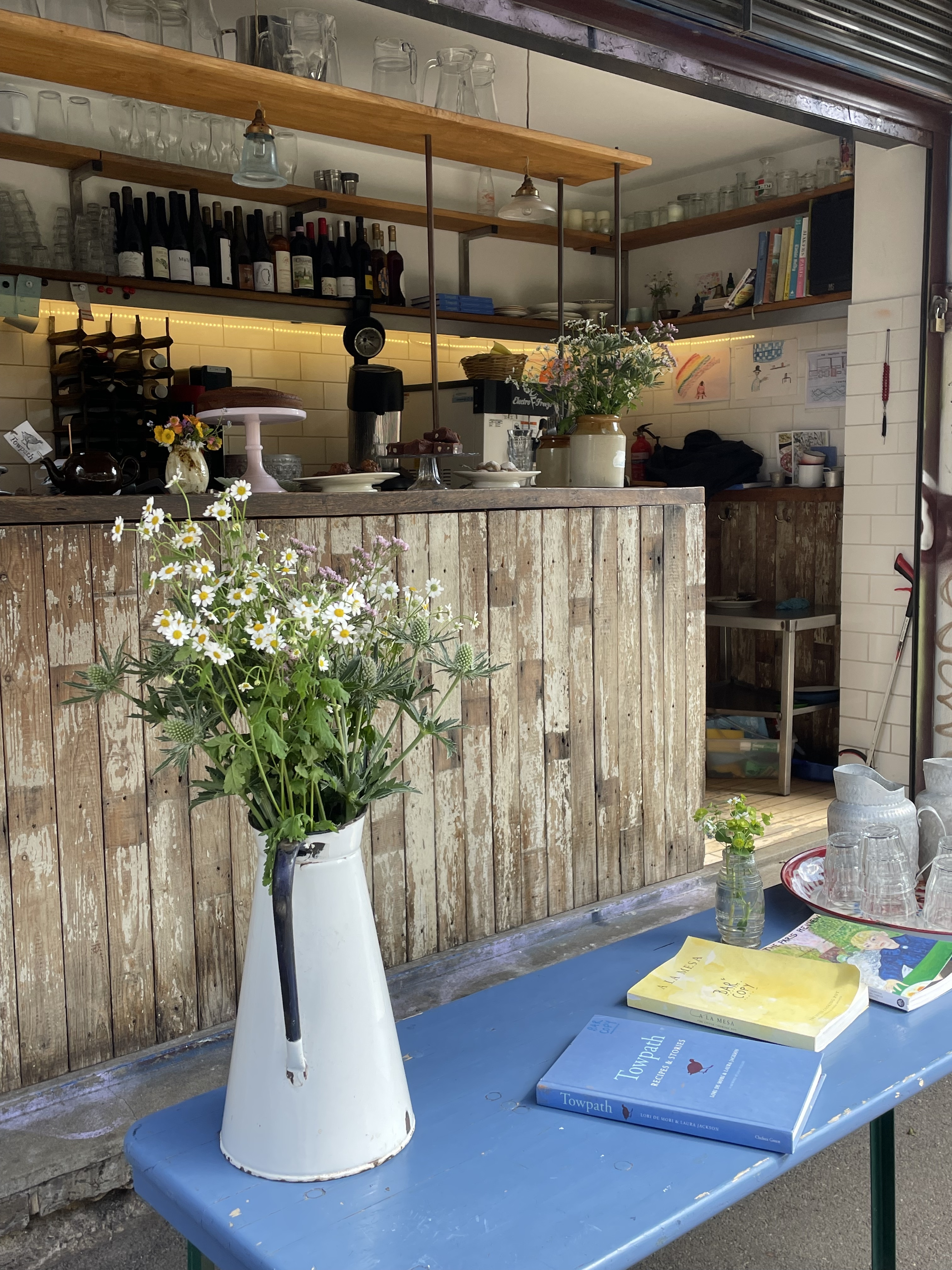
Towpath kiosk #2, bar

The cafe itself is located inside of four kiosks on the towpath between Whitmore Road and Kingsland High Street in De Beauvoir Town. In 2010, the cafe started out as three shallow units, but has since expanded. Each kiosk serves as a different section of the cafe: kitchen, bar, seating, and larder. Weather permitting, there is additional outdoor seating available.

== Food ==
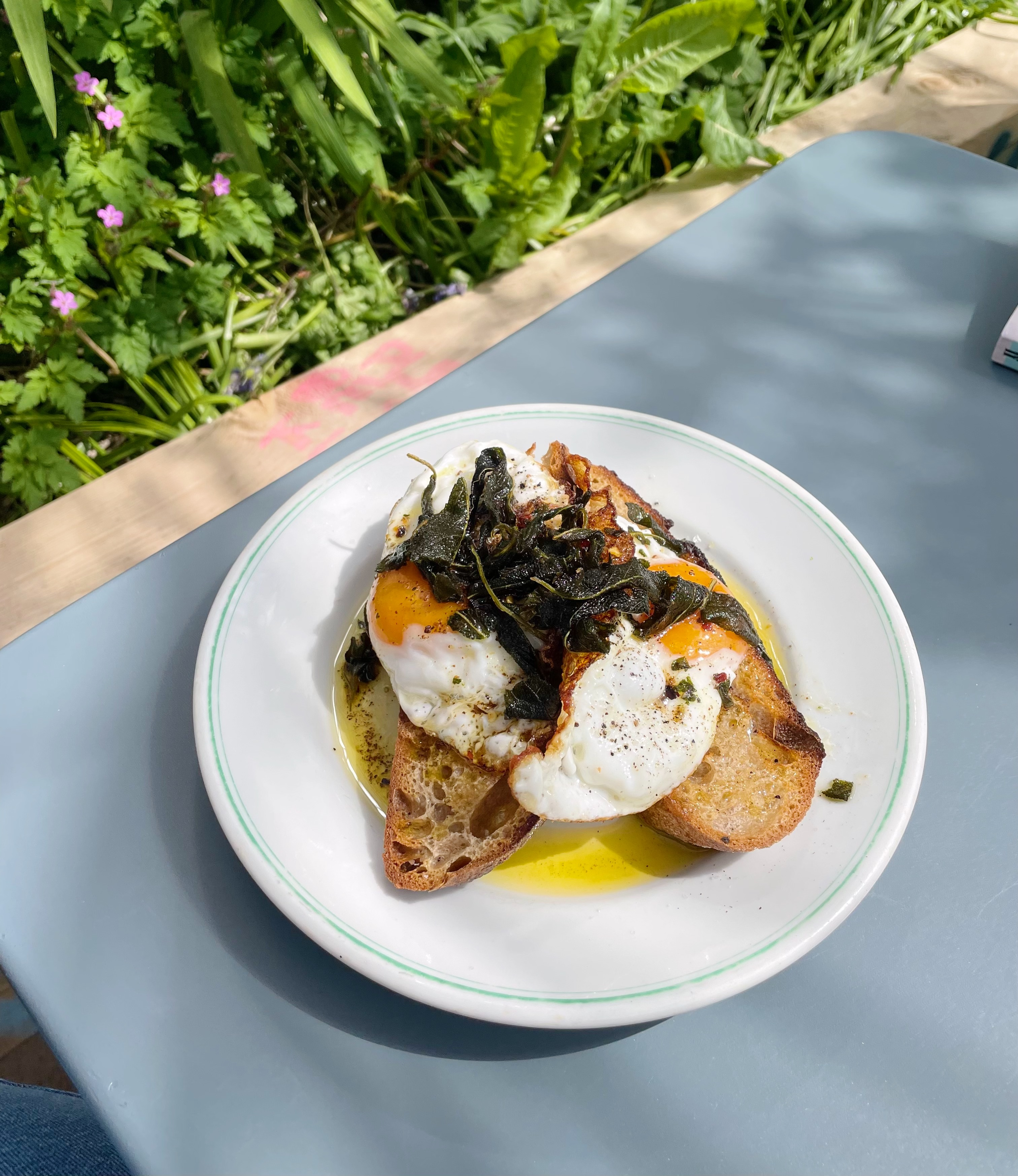
Fried eggs on sourdough with sage

The cafe serves breakfast, brunch, lunch, and pastries. Their menu features Mediterranean and British-inspired dishes prepared using locally sourced, seasonal ingredients.

== Owners ==
Laura Jackson, co-owner and chef at Towpath, received her diploma from Leith's Cookery School in London. Before starting Towpath, Jackson worked at Melrose & Morgan and Rochelle Canteen.

Lori de Mori, co-owner of Towpath, met Jackson while visiting the hotel Auberge de Chassignolles in Auvergne, France. De Mori asked Jackson to partner with her to create Towpath. Since then, de Mori has been working front of house while Jackson works back of house.

Jackson and de Mori launched a series of podcast episodes detailing their founding and operating Towpath.

== Cookbook ==
In October 2020, Jackson and de Mori published Towpath: Recipes and Stories, a cookbook that details Towpath Cafe's culinary offerings and background. Each chapter is marked by a month in which the cafe is open.

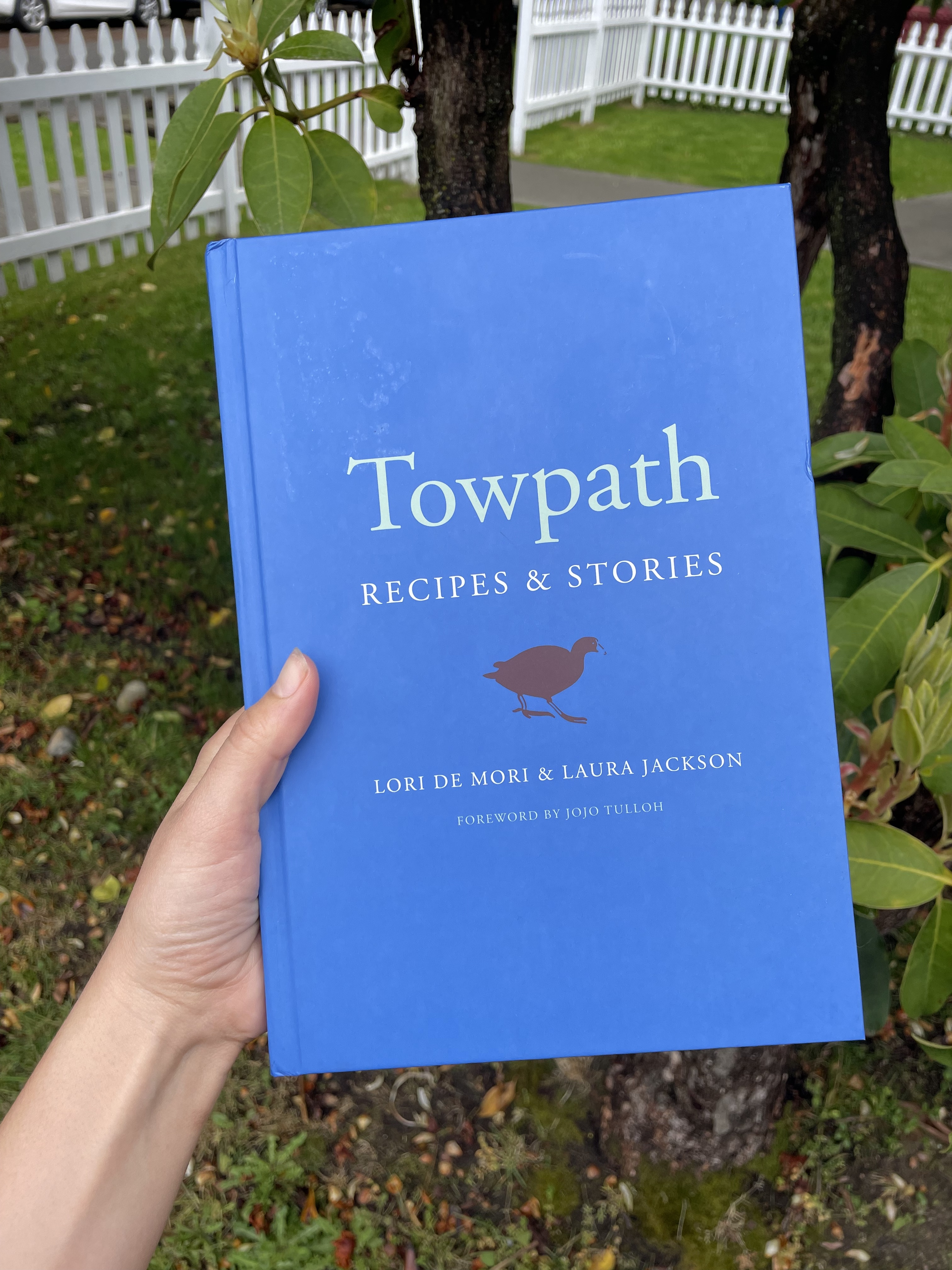
"Towpath: Recipes & Stories"
