= William Crozier =

William Crozier may refer to:

- William Crozier (artillerist) (1855–1942), American general, artillerist and inventor
- William Crozier (Scottish artist) (1893–1930)
- William Crozier (Irish artist) (1930–2011)
- William Crozier (cricketer) (1873–1916), Irish cricketer
- William Percival Crozier (1879–1944), British journalist and editor
- William Crozier (1839–1906), son and heir of John Crozier, South Australian pastoralist
- William John Crozier (1892–1955), American physiologist
