= Daquise =

Polish restaurant in London

Daquise is a Polish restaurant on Thurloe Street in South Kensington, London. It opened in 1947. The restaurant's name is a portmanteau of that of the founder, a Mr Dakowski, and his French wife Louise.

== History ==
First opened in 1947, the restaurant suffered fires in 2005 and 2011. According to the Independent, the restaurant was once the unofficial headquarters of Edward Raczynski, the Polish president-in-exile from 1979 to 1986. Writing in The Guardian in 2010, Oliver Thirring wrote that Daquise "was always a favourite of cold war spies", among them Christine Keeler. He also noted that "Roman Polanski came daily for dumplings and stews when he was filming Repulsion nearby".

In 2024 it was reported that the restaurant may close, partly because Transport for London wished to expand the nearby South Kensington tube station. Writing in The New European, Josh Barrie wrote that the news was "the latest potential blow to Britain’s food heritage".

== See also ==
- List of British restaurants
