= Titanic (restaurant) =

Coordinates: 51°30′39″N 0°8′10″W

- Interactive map of Titanic

Restaurant information
- Established: 6 December 1998
- Closed: January 2002
- Chef: Marco Pierre White
- Location: Regent Palace Hotel, London, United Kingdom
- Seating capacity: 220

Titanic was a restaurant near Piccadilly Circus within the Regent Palace Hotel in London that was open between December 1998 and January 2002. It was operated by chef Marco Pierre White as a joint venture with the Forte Group. It became a known celebrity hang-out, but went through two legal battles; first with shipbuilders Harland and Wolff and then with Oliver Peyton, proprietor of the Atlantic Bar and Grill which was also within the same hotel. The restaurant was named after the RMS Titanic, precisely because it was located above the Atlantic within the hotel. The menu served a simplified menu compared to White's other restaurants due to the number of covers that the restaurant could hold. The Titanic was poorly received by critics, with criticism directed at both the décor and the food.

== History ==
The restaurant was located within the Regent Palace Hotel, in central London. The Regent Palace was located directly off Piccadilly Circus. The hotel was owned by Forte Group, and already had a restaurant called the Atlantic Bar and Grill which was owned by restaurateur Oliver Peyton. The Titanic was located directly above the Atlantic within the hotel, and Peyton was irritated by diners attempting to book at the Titanic prior to opening by calling his restaurant. Marco Pierre White was the managing partner of the restaurant, being backed by hotel owners Forte. It was named Titanic because it was on top of the Atlantic, and so it was decorated in the style of a liner. White directly linked the restaurant to the RMS Titanic, with the phone number for the restaurant ending in 1912 – the year that the ship sank. The restaurant cost £2 million to decorate, and sat 220 diners. The location also converted into a night club in the late evenings. White described it as "Mirabelle's funky big sister".

The restaurant held a Christmas party for the magazine Tatler on 1 December 1998, during the week prior to the official launch which took place on 6 December. The opening party was attended by a number of celebrities, including Billy Zane who had recently appeared in the film Titanic (1997), as well as the Spice Girls, All Saints, Goldie, Lenny Kravitz and models Sophie Dahl and Mandy Smith.

The restaurant was involved in two legal battles. The first was when shipbuilders Harland and Wolff launched an action due to the use of the name "Titanic" as the ocean liner was built in their shipyard between 1908 and 1911. The challenge was ridiculed in the British press, with Sebastian Faulks stating in The Evening Standard that "A deep-sea diver instructed to work on an 86-year-old shipwreck many fathoms deep off the American coast could so easily be misled into going into a restaurant off Piccadilly Circus that bears the same name."

The second was when Peyton launched a legal challenge to the location of the restaurant around the time that it first opened, as his contract with Forte Group had an exclusivity clause. By the time the challenge was launched, Forte had been bought out by Granada plc. Peyton's lawyers offered White the opportunity to settle the case out of court, but he refused. Peyton dropped the injunction and damages case following the second day of the hearing, which resulted in White declaring a victory saying that "The Titanic has sailed over the Atlantic – and they have failed to sink us." Peyton subsequently stated that he was never suing White, only the hotel group. It was also mentioned in the press following the reaction of a customer after his credit card was declined. Rupinder Singh had run up a £895 bill, and subsequently issued death threats and punched through a glass wall panel. He was arrested and pleaded guilty to using threatening words and behaviour.

By June 2000, the restaurant was no longer opening at lunchtimes and was operating at half capacity. In January 2002, White handed control of the Titanic over to the hotel group. The umbrella group, MPW Criterion, lost £2.24 million during the previous year. Whilst he was in charge of the Titanic, the hotel chain had been repeatedly sold. First from Forte to Granada, then to Compass Group and finally to Japanese investment bank Nomura Group. White described the end of the Titanic, saying that it "sank".

== Menu ==
Due to the number of covers, White attempted to keep the menu at the Titanic much simpler than at his other restaurants. Staples such as burgers and french fries were included (listed on the menu as Steak Hache A La MacDonalds), as were Eggs Benedict and corned beef hash with fried eggs and HP Sauce. Desserts included a signature doughnut served with cherry sauce, and brandy snaps with vanilla cream.

== Reception ==
In January 1999, James Delingpole reviewed the restaurant for The Independent. He found that the wait between courses was long, his food arrived cooked incorrectly or undercooked and found that the waiter didn't know about wine but tried to make it up as he went along. He said that "Titanic is a total waste of life and only worth visiting if you're the sort of saddo who thinks it's essential for your credibility to be seen in the latest MPW restaurant". Another reviewer for The Independent, Tracey MacLeod, described the interior as an "Art-Deco approximation of Hades". She ordered the clam chowder but thought it was thin and the potato tasted re-heated. She also thought that the sticky toffee pudding was "neither sticky enough nor toffeeish enough", but the bread and butter pudding was better. Richard Wallace ate at Titanic in March 1999 and reviewed it for The Daily Mirror. He described the service as "first class" but that his fries were undercooked. A friend of his thought that the bread and butter pudding was soggy.

The Zagat guide stated in its review of Titanic that "its standards are sinking without a trace". Sebastian Faulks in The Evening Standard took along a younger friend, who praised the roast pheasant and the Caesar salads.
