= Oblix (restaurant) =

Restaurant in London

Oblix at the Shard

Restaurant information
- Location: The Shard, 31 St Thomas St, London, SE1 9RY, United Kingdom

Oblix or Oblix at The Shard is an English restaurant located in The Shard, Southwark, London. It was opened in September 2012 by restaurateur Rainer Becker, and is located on the 32nd floor of The Shard, the tallest building in the United Kingdom. The interiors were styled by Claudio Silvestrin.

In 2022, Country and Town House named Oblix "Restaurant of the Week".
