= Zuma (restaurant) =

International Japanese-style restaurant chain

Azumi Ltd t/a Zuma
- Industry: Food & beverage
- Founded: 2002; 24 years ago
- Founders: Rainer Becker Divia Lalvani
- Headquarters: London, UK
- Number of locations: London, Hong Kong, Istanbul, Dubai, Miami, Abu Dhabi, New York City, Las Vegas, Bangkok, Rome, Mykonos, Boston, Bodrum, Porto Cervo, Datça Peninsula, Phuket, Kitzbühel, Madrid, Maldives, Ibiza, Doha, Capri, Cannes
- Services: Japanese izakaya-style dining
- Parent: Azumi Ltd. Group
- Website: zumarestaurant.com

Zuma is a chain of Japanese izakaya-style restaurants founded in 2002 by Rainer Becker and Arjun Waney. The first Zuma location opened in the Knightsbridge area of London, with a concept developed by Becker during his six years working in Tokyo, where he immersed himself in Japanese cuisine and culture. The restaurant features three kitchens: the main kitchen, the sushi counter, and the robata grill. Zuma has expanded globally, with 14 permanent outlets and 8 seasonal locations in various cities worldwide.

== Background ==
Zuma was founded in 2002 by German chef Rainer Becker and investor Arjun Waney. It offers a variety of dishes and modern Japanese cuisine as well as a vegan and vegetarian menu. Zuma serves teriyaki dishes (chicken, beef, and shrimp), bento boxes, dumplings, tempura, and a variety of sushi rolls.

Zuma has outlets in London, Hong Kong, Thailand, Turkey, United Arab Emirates, United States, Italy, Austria, Spain, Maldives, France, Greece, Qatar, and Germany.
