= The Restaurant =

The Restaurant may refer to:

- The Restaurant (British TV series), a BBC Two series, featuring Raymond Blanc
  - The Restaurant (British series 1) (2007), the first series of the above
  - The Restaurant (British series 2) (2008), the second series of the above
  - The Restaurant (British series 3) (2009), the third series of the above
- Vår tid är nu, or The Restaurant in English, a Swedish television series
- The Restaurant (American TV series) (2003–2004)
- The Restaurant (Irish TV series), an RTÉ television series featuring celebrity head chefs each week

== See also ==
- Restaurant (disambiguation)
