= Van Zeller =

Coordinates: 53°59′35.1″N 1°32′38″W

- Interactive map of Van Zeller

Restaurant information
- Location: North Yorkshire, England

Van Zeller was a restaurant located in the North Yorkshire Spa town of Harrogate. It was part-owned by head chef Tom van Zeller, who is in partnership with David Moore (of London's two Michelin starred Pied à Terre and Michelin starred L’Autre Pied) and other private investors.

Tom van Zeller worked with international chefs around the world before returning to the UK to work with some of masters of the culinary world including Raymond Blanc, Pierre Koffman, Tom Aikens and Simon Gueller. Van Zellers served food using locally sourced, seasonal produce.

== Awards ==
Van Zellers won awards including:

- Best Newcomer 2010 – Northern Hospitality Awards
- Best Chef 2010 – Harrogate Hospitality and Tourism Awards
- Best Chef 2010 – Oliver Awards
- Shortlisted for the Best Newcomer at the Catey Awards 2010.
- Game Chef of the Year 2014

== See also ==
- List of companies in Harrogate
