= The Restaurant (British TV series) series 2 =

Season of television series

The Restaurant
- Season 2
- Contestants
- Starring: Michele & Russell; Alasdair & James; Lindsie & Tim; Helen & Stephen; Laura & Peter; Caroline & Chris; Harriet & Mike; Richard & Scott; Annette & Kashelle
- No. of episodes: 8

Release
- Original network: BBC Two

Series chronology
- ← Previous; Series 1 Next → Series 3

The second series of The Restaurant is a television series that aired in the United Kingdom on BBC Two from 10 September to 29 October in 2008. Auditions took place in Manchester and London during March and April 2008. (The series aired in the United States on BBC America in early 2009 under the title "Last Restaurant Standing.")

Raymond Blanc keeps his role in the series, and nine couples once again compete for the chance to open their own restaurant backed by Blanc.

In July 2009 the winners, Russell Clement & Michele English, launched their own venture The Cheerful Soul in the Hare and Hounds in Marlow, Buckinghamshire (the site of the restaurant of the runners-up, Alasdair Hooper & James Knight-Pacheco). On 30 July 2010 Russell and Michele announced (on their blog) that they were leaving The Cheerful Soul.

In 2009, the BBC announced that Alasdair & James would feature in a spin-off series, provisionally titled Plate Expectations, in early 2010. The series, which finally aired under the title Out of the Frying Pan, follows them as they launch their own event catering business.

== Contestants ==
The contestants that took part in the series were (in reverse order of elimination):

- Russell Clement & Michele English – a couple from Essex ran The Cheerful Soul in Northwood, Middlesex. They already run a buffet business but aspire to open their own restaurant.
- Alasdair Hooper & James Knight-Pacheco (2nd Place) – friends from Devon ran The Gallery, near Marlow, Buckinghamshire. Alasdair works for Pizza Express as a waiter and James is a former chef de partie at The Square and Gordon Ramsay at Claridge's. They both aim to open a Michelin-starred restaurant. In 2010 James was working as a tutor at the Ashburton Cookery School.

James is now married and living in Dubai working as a head chef. Alasdair is running the Dartmouth Ice-cream Company, Dartmouth, Devon. He lives with his fiancé Jessica Quick, who is an Occupational Therapist, and their baby daughter Isla.

- Tim & Lindsie Selby (3rd Place) – a married couple from Kent ran True Provenance in Brentford. Tim is a TGI Friday's operations manager and line cook who rose through the ranks to manage nine restaurants while Lindsie is an HR manager. They want to run an ethically sourced restaurant.
- Helen & Stephen Bryan (4th place) – a married couple from Cambridgeshire ran Nel's in Wendover, Buckinghamshire. Helen used to work in marketing but has some experience working in professional kitchens. Stephen is an ex-naval officer. They think they could be the new "Fanny and Johnnie".
  Following the series Steven has become a hotel manager. Helen is working in local government.
- Peter Dong & Laura Scale (5th) – a couple from South Wales ran The Welsh Wok, in Haddenham, Buckinghamshire. Peter is a team manager with a blue chip company and Laura is a service manager who has always wanted to work in the hospitality industry.
- Chris & Caroline Hanson (6th) – a married couple from South Yorkshire ran Ray White's in Weston-on-the-Green, Bicester, Oxfordshire. Chris has been a chef at a pub for the past nine years and Caroline is an extended schools worker. Their restaurant aims to celebrate the best of British food.
  Chris is now working the food festival circuit.
- Harriet & Mike Ashworth (7th) – a father and daughter pairing from Surrey ran The Blue Goose in Oxford. Mike is owner and director of two recruitment businesses and Harriet is an event planner who has worked as a Crown Court Clerk.
  Harriet currently runs the kitchen at Public House
- Scott Sheppard & Richard Hammond (8th) – a couple from Sussex ran Sorbet and Seasons in Surbiton. Scott trained as a chef 18 years ago, but is currently a manager in first and business class for an airline. Richard used to be an airline steward and is now the director of a soft drinks company.
- Annette Cockburn & Kashelle Taylor (9th – Weren't given a restaurant) – a mother and daughter team from South Yorkshire planned on opening Caribbean Delights but were eliminated without being given a restaurant. Annette is a care worker and Kashelle is a freelance actress.

== Episodes ==
=== Week One ===
- In challenge: All couples
- Challenge: Signature Dish – In 3 groups of three, create a signature dish that was either a starter, main or dessert for their restaurant.
- Eliminated: Annette and Kashelle, for creating "Mango Whizz" – frozen Mango Pulp from a tin, putting little to no effort in to the challenge.

=== Week Two ===
- Task: Pay What It Is Worth – The customers could pay what they wanted for their meals.
- Restaurant of the week: Helen & Stephen
- In challenge: Harriet & Mike (put in the challenge on the second episode of Week One, for their poor opening night), Michele & Russell (for being disorganised with their booking on the night of the task) and Richard & Scott (for ignoring Raymond's advice to add either Sorbets or Seasonal food to their menu)
- Challenge: Motorway Service – Create five dishes for the public at a motorway service station
- Eliminated: Richard & Scott, for failing to market their food well in the challenge and poor presentation of the food itself.

=== Week Three ===
- Task: No Waste, No Loss – Given half a pig, minimise waste, maximise profit.
- Restaurant of the week: Michele & Russell
- In challenge: Alasdair & James (because James regards the kitchen as his sole responsibility), Chris & Caroline (for tasteless food) and Harriet & Mike (for Mike's lack of effort)
- Challenge: Oxford Formal Halls – cater for high and low table at three Oxford colleges.
- Eliminated: Harriet & Mike for Mike's lack of commitment.

=== Week Four ===
- Task: Flags of the World – the couples must adjust their menus to include the national cuisine of a foreign country, while maintaining their own concept and identity.
- Restaurant of the week: Michele & Russell
- In challenge: Chris & Caroline (for their evening being a disaster), Peter & Laura (for lack of control in the kitchen) and Tim & Lindsie (as their commitment was in question, particularly Lindsie's due to missing their one-year-old son).
- Challenge: Airline Food – The three couples in the challenge must serve the First Class passengers on a jumbo jet the best food they can muster.
- Eliminated: Chris & Caroline for poor quality food and tasting from Chris.

=== Week Five ===
- Task: Takeaway – Run a take-away business as well as catering for customers in the restaurant.
- Restaurant of the week: None — Raymond didn't think that any of the restaurants were up to scratch.
- In challenge: Peter & Laura (for Peter's lack of control in the kitchen), Alasdair & James (for being immature) and Helen & Stephen (for not taking advice)
- Challenge: The Dinner Party – Cooking meals for dinner parties in three private homes
- Eliminated: Peter & Laura

=== Week Six ===
- Task: Cookery Demonstration – Demonstrating cooking in public on the streets
- Restaurant of the week: Lindsie & Tim
- In challenge: Alasdair & James ("if you have any talent for business it is very well hidden"), Michele & Russell (for failing to meet Blanc's high expectations) and Helen & Stephen (because the last time they were put in the challenge the quality of Helen's food improved significantly).
- Challenge: Cook Book – The couples have to come up with cook books that promote their restaurant concepts.
- Eliminated: Helen & Stephen for not being as high a standard as the other couples

=== Week Seven ===
- Task: Tricky Customer – Raymond invites back the least satisfied customers from the couples' previous weeks of service, and adds some customers that require very special care, but only tells the restaurants this when it is time for them to take their bookings.
- Restaurant of the week: None
- In challenge: All three couples, as Raymond thought it was very close between all three couples, and all had their strengths and weaknesses.
- Challenge: Masterclasses – Instead of sending them out to a challenge, he hands the couples' front-of-house to David Moore to test while personally putting the couples' chefs through a much tougher cooking regime than they expected. Then Sarah Willingham tests the couples' business skills. After that they have to serve up what they have learned to some of the most discerning palates and fastidious managers in the trade.
- Eliminated: Lindsie & Tim

=== Week Eight ===
- Task: First Class Service – The finalists must cater for a group of discerning guests on one of the world's most romantic railway journeys – The Orient Express
- Eliminated: Alasdair & James
- Winners of the Restaurant: Michele & Russell

== Weekly results ==
Contestants	Week								Result
Contestants	1^{1}	2	3	4	5^{2}	6	7^{3}	8	Result
Michele and Russell									Winners
Alasdair and James									Runners-up
Lindsie and Tim									Eliminated Week Seven
Helen and Stephen									Eliminated Week Six
Laura and Peter									Eliminated Week Five
Caroline and Chris									Eliminated Week Four
Harriet and Mike									Eliminated Week Three
Richard and Scott									Eliminated Week Two
Annette and Kashelle									Eliminated Week One
Contestants	1	2	3	4	5	6	7	8	Result
Contestants	Week								Result

Legend
Finale
Restaurant of the week
In challenge

^Note 1: All couples were in the challenge in the first week; Raymond revealed that only 8 of the 9 couples would receive a restaurant.
^Note 2: Raymond did not nominate a restaurant of the week in Week Five, as he thought that none of the restaurants met the required standard.
^Note 3: None of the three restaurants were put directly through to the final as Raymond thought that each couple had its own strengths and weaknesses.

== The restaurants ==
- Chris & Caroline's restaurant, Ray White's in Weston-on-the-Green, Bicester, Oxfordshire is the Ben Johnson pub.
- Helen & Stephen's restaurant, Nel's in Wendover, Buckinghamshire is usually Le Bistro.
- James & Alasdair's restaurant, The Gallery, near Marlow, Buckinghamshire is The Hare and Hounds on Henley Road. (Now the site of winners, Michelle and Russell's restaurant, The Cheerful Soul)
- Peter & Laura's restaurant, The Welsh Wok, in Haddenham, Buckinghamshire is usually The Green Dragon.
- Tim & Lindsie's restaurant, True Provenance in Brentford at San Marco on Ferry Quays.
- Russell & Michele's restaurant, The Cheerful Soul in Northwood, Middlesex is now Metro Piazza.
- Harriet & Mike's restaurant, The Blue Goose in Oxford was in real life the Sahara in Blue Boar Street. Now taken over and named The House.
- Scott & Richard's restaurant, Sorbet and Seasons in Surbiton is normally Da Lucio in Maple Road.
