= David Moore (restaurateur) =

British restaurateur, born 1964

David Moore (born 4 August 1964) is a restaurateur based in the United Kingdom.

== Biography ==
Moore was born in County Monaghan, Ireland. He is the owner of Michelin starred restaurant Pied à Terre, situated on London's Charlotte Street in Fitzrovia.

After achieving his Higher National Diploma in Hotel, Catering and Institutional Management (HCIMA), Moore worked in the highly regarded The Box Tree, Ilkley in 1985 when the restaurant was of two Michelin Star status. In 1986, he took a position in Le Manoir aux Quat' Saisons, Great Milton, Oxon working alongside world-renowned chef Raymond Blanc. Moore also worked for a stint in Le Louis XV restaurant in Monte Carlo's Hotel de Paris.

In 1991, Moore opened his first French fine-dining restaurant, Pied à Terre on Charlotte Street in London's West End. Pied à Terre was an instant success, gaining Michelin star status just thirteen months after opening, and a second Michelin star in January 1996.

In November 2004, a fire forced the closure of the restaurant for most of 2005 but Moore insisted it was rebuilt, redecorated and resurrected back to life to re-open on 26 September 2005.

With Moore as owner, Pied à Terre has achieved many more awards including: Four Red Rosettes AA, 8/10 in the Good Food Guide, 29/30 in the Zagat ‘Readers Choice’ and Best Restaurant in the World 2007 as voted in the Top 50 Restaurant Magazine. Pied à Terre's wine list has received multiple award, but moist recently joint N

In October 2013 Moore opened his first pop-restaurant, Pieds Nus. In the short time it was open, it received rave reviews from The Telegraph, Hello Magazine, The Evening Standard and many more.

David Moore is also founding partner of the London Cocktail Club, which has gone on to open multiple bars across the UK. He is a trustee of Cockpit Arts.

David Moore has made several TV appearances including BBC MasterChef: The Professionals and BBC Out of the Frying Pan, both of which aired in summer 2010. He was an inspector on BBC The Restaurant, series 2 and 3, alongside his former mentor Raymond Blanc and fellow inspector Sarah Willingham.
