= The Restaurant (British TV series) series 3 =

The Restaurant
- Season 3
- Contestants
- Starring: JJ and James; Chris and Nathan; Rebecca and Stephen; Daisy and Nadine; Barney and Badger; Frances and Lucy; Janet and Sean; Sarah and Joe; Natalie and Sandy
- No. of episodes: 8

Release
- Original network: BBC Two

Series chronology
- ← Previous; Series 2

The third and final series of The Restaurant is a television series that aired in the United Kingdom on BBC Two from 29 October to 17 December in 2009.

The judges were again Raymond Blanc, Sarah Willingham and David Moore. Nine couples competed for the chance to open their own restaurant, this time backed by all three judges.

Filming for the third series, which is based in Bristol, began on 12 June. In what were apparently cost-cutting measures, the format was changed from previous series. There was only one episode each week, no challenge, and the restaurants were not allocated until the third week. Only six couples were given a restaurant to run.

In a departure from the previous series there was much less emphasis on cooking skills, or actual performance during the series with a greater focus on the couples' concepts for their restaurants, as shown by JJ and James's win despite the former's lack of cooking skills and abysmal performance in the majority of tasks.

The Restaurant was made by BBC Vision Productions.

In July 2010 the BBC announced that the show has ended.

== Contestants ==
- JJ Goodman and James Hopkins (1st), partners in life, business partners and the winkers in The London Cocktail Club in Covent Garden, from London.
- Chris Hackett and Nathan Gooding (2nd), from Kent and London.
- Rebecca and Stephen (3rd), a married couple from London.
- Daisy and Nadine (4th), from Herefordshire and London.
- Barney and Badger (5th), two former soldiers from Essex and Kent.
- Frances and Lucy (6th), former Cheltenham Ladies' College pupils.
- Janet and Sean Duffy (7th), florists from Windsor, were eliminated without being given a restaurant.
- Sarah and Joe (8th), a mother and son team from Devon, were eliminated without being given a restaurant.
- Natalie and Sandy (9th), a mother and daughter team from Yorkshire, were eliminated without being given a restaurant, on safety grounds.

== Episodes ==
=== Week One ===
- Task: The Pitch — In 3 groups of three, create a signature dish that was either a starter, main or dessert for their restaurant. While presenting their dish to the judges they also had to pitch their concept for a restaurant.
- Eliminated:
  Natalie and Sandy were eliminated mid-show for dangerous use of knives, lack of organisation, and a mousse that failed to set.
  Sarah and Joe were eliminated at the end of the show for not having a clear vision for their restaurant, despite Sarah cooking one of the better dishes of all the contestants.

=== Week Two ===
- Task: The Chain — The seven couples left in the competition must run three leading chain restaurants in Bristol.

- Pizza Express at Harbourside : Janet and Sean, Daisy and Nadine;
- Yo Sushi at Cabot Circus : Barney and Badger, Frances and Lucy, Rebecca and Stephen; and
- Tampopo at Cabot Circus : Chris and Nathan, JJ and James.

- Eliminated: Janet and Sean were eliminated for falling behind so far in evening service that they closed without having served a large proportion of the customers seated in their restaurant.

=== Week Three ===
- Task: Opening Night — the remaining couples are given their restaurants and must demonstrate their concepts.
- Restaurants Drawn:

- Barney and Badger - Barrington & Badger's at The Muset on Clifton Road in Clifton.

- Chris and Nathan - Rags to Riches at the Walrus and Carpenter on Hensman's Hill.

- Daisy and Nadine - D'Soiree at the site of One30 on Cheltenham Road in Stokes Croft.

- JJ and James - The Summer House on the site of the former Deasons on Whiteladies Road.

- Frances and Lucy - The Cheeky Pig at The Olive Shed on Princes Wharf.

- Rebecca and Stephen - The Front Room at the former Howards Restaurant on Avon Crescent.

- Restaurant of the week: Barney and Badger - Barrington & Badger's
- Eliminated: Frances and Lucy were eliminated because the judges felt they did not possess the skills to successfully run a restaurant and were unlikely to develop them over the remaining weeks of the competition; "I felt — it was too much for you, too much too take on, too much to learn, that the industry is too tough for you; you're not prepared yet — I wish you all the best." said Blanc.

=== Week Four ===
- Task: The Seasonal Ingredient — The five remaining couples must make dishes to sell at a local farmers market using only fresh, local and seasonal produce. Their dishes must showcase the best produce and promote their restaurant concepts. They were then delivered gifts of freshly caught rabbit and pigeon with which to create dishes for their restaurants.
- Restaurant of the week: Rebecca and Stephen - The Front Room
- Eliminated: Barney and Badger did not attend the farmer's market challenge. In reviewing this with Blanc, Badger effectively quit when he admitted that he was "not going to be able to give 100%". "Their service was excellent, and their monition present; but the problem is they want different things — so I closed their restaurant" said Blanc.

=== Week Five ===
- Task: The Cake — During a heatwave in Bristol, the four remaining couples serve afternoon tea to over 130 guests at a tea dance. They then had to run a function for high-profile guests with exacting specifications, including a cake, as well as their normal service.
- Restaurant of the week: none
- Eliminated: Daisy and Nadine, as Blanc felt that their concept had been lost.

=== Week Six ===
- Task: The Singles — The remaining couples offer a romantic takeaway dinner for two, followed by a singles night.
- Restaurant of the week: none
- Eliminated: none

=== Week Seven ===
- Task: The Demo — The three remaining couples must stage a cookery masterclass in their restaurants.
- Restaurant of the week: none
- Eliminated: Rebecca and Stephen — The judges felt that they would not be reliable partners under the pressure of business.

=== Week Eight ===
- Task: Final — The two remaining chefs are given a cooking lesson at Le Manoir aux Quat' Saisons and their front-of-house partners are given a lesson in providing a high level of service at David Moore's restaurant in London. Their final challenge is to serve a banquet for Lord and Lady Arran and guests at Castle Hill, Filleigh. Following tough deliberations, JJ and James were chosen as winners.
- Eliminated: Chris and Nathan
- Winners of the Restaurant: JJ and James — Despite JJ's lack of cooking ability, they worked well together and had a clearer concept.
