= Shaun Dickens =

- Born: 29 March 1984 (age 42)
- Education: Westminster Kingsway College
- Spouse: Gemma Dickens
- Culinary career
- Cooking style: Modern British
- Awards won: Tatler Magazine – Best of Britain 2014; Oxfordshire Restaurant of the Year 2014; Toptable Top 100 Restaurants 2013; Acorn Award 2012
- Website: shaundickens.co.uk

Shaun Dickens is a chef who owns the Shaun Dickens at the Boathouse restaurant in Henley-on-Thames, Oxfordshire, England.

== Career ==
Dickens trained at Westminster Kingsway College in London, during which time he was one of six students to appear on ITV's Yes Chef!

His first position was at Raymond Blanc's two Michelin star restaurant Le Manoir aux Quat'Saisons before he moved to New York to work for Thomas Keller at the three Michelin star Per Se. He returned to England two years later and worked at L'Ortolan in Reading, which also holds a Michelin star. During this time he came third in the Restaurant Association's Young Chef Young Waiter 2009 competition, and the following year he came third in the Craft Guild of Chefs' Young National Chef of the Year competition.

In 2012, Dickens won The Caterer's Acorn Award, which recognises 30 people under the age of 30 who have made a significant impression in their field.

In April 2013, Shaun Dickens at the Boathouse was officially opened by Blanc. Shortly afterwards, it was named as one of that year's top 100 restaurants in the country by OpenTable/Toptable.

The restaurant was forced to close in February 2014 due to flooding from the nearby River Thames but reopened again in April. For these three months, Dickens operated from a pop-up restaurant on board the New Orleans, a paddle-steamer owned by neighbouring tour operator Hobbs of Henley.

In May 2014, Shaun Dickens at the Boathouse won the Best of Britain Award for the best restaurant outside London in that year's Tatler Magazine Restaurant awards. Six months later, Dickens' venture was named both best gastronomic restaurant in the county and best restaurant at the Oxfordshire Restaurant Awards.

Dickens has also featured in articles in the Financial Times, The Daily Express and The Independent.
