= Restaurant (disambiguation) =

A restaurant is a place for people to eat.

Restaurant may also refer to:

- The Restaurant (British TV series), a BBC Two TV show featuring Raymond Blanc
- The Restaurant (Irish TV series), an RTÉ television series featuring celebrity head chefs each week
- The Restaurant (American TV series), reality show featuring Rocco DiSpirito
- Restaurant (magazine), a British magazine
- Restaurant (1965 film), a film directed by Andy Warhol at The Factory in New York City
- Restaurant (1998 film), a romantic film starring Adrien Brody and Elise Neal, directed by Eric Bross
- Restaurant (2006 film), a Marathi language movie directed by Sachin Kundalkar

== See also ==
- Restaurateur, a term for a person who opens and runs a restaurant
