= Dru Masters =

British composer (born 1965)

- Born: 1965 (age 60–61); London, England
- Genre: Television score
- Occupation: Composer
- Website: www.drumasters.com

Dru Masters (born 29 July 1965) is a British composer, best known for composing television music. He has composed tracks for the British version of The Apprentice and The Unteachables, amongst others. He has also composed music for the television channel ITV4, and a number of advertisements (including PlayStation, Morrisons, Barclaycard and Martini).

== Early life ==
Born in London, Dru trained at the Purcell School of Music between 1976 and 1983. He played Tenor Saxophone with the National Youth Jazz Orchestra from 1980 to 1982.

== Music composed for TV ==
- Taskmaster (2015—present) Broadcaster: Dave/Channel 4
- Silk (2011) Broadcaster: BBC1 (BBC)
- Dispatches Broadcaster: Channel 4
- Last Chance Kids Broadcaster: Channel 4
- The Restaurant Broadcaster: BBC2 (BBC)
- The Apprentice (UK and some international versions, not US) (2005/2006) Broadcaster: BBC2/BBC1 (BBC)
- The Unteachables (2005) Broadcaster: Channel 4
- Football Icon (2005) Broadcaster: Sky One (BSkyB)
- Are You Younger Than You Think? (2005) Broadcaster: BBC1 (BBC)
- Dispatches: MMR What They Didn't Tell You (2005) Broadcaster: Channel 4
- The Body of... (2004) Broadcaster: BBC3 (BBC)
- Star Portraits (2004) Broadcaster: BBC1 (BBC)
- Transworld Sport (2000–2006) Broadcaster: Channel 4
- How Not to Die (2005) Broadcaster: Sky One (BSkyB)
- Total Rugby (2005) Broadcaster: Sky Sports 2 (BSkyB)
- Children's Ward (1995–2000) Broadcaster: ITV
- The Autistic Gardener (2015) Broadcaster: Channel 4
- Capital (2015) Broadcaster: BBC

== Record production ==
- Artist: Mediaeval Baebes Title: Mirabilis (album) Year: 2005 Label: Nettwerk
- Artist: Bananarama Title: Love The Way (album track) Year: 2005 Label: A&G
- Artist: Bananarama Title: Live in the Sun (B side) Year: 2005 Label: A&G
- Artist: Amici Forever Title: Jupiter (album track) Year: 2004 Label: RCA Victor BMG
- Artist: Holly Valance Title: State of Mind (Harry Valance remix) Year: 2003 Label: Warner Bros. Records
- Artist: The Big Blue Title: Theory of Everything (album) Year: 1996 Label: EMI
- Artist: Manic Street Preachers Title: Roses in the Hospital (Fillet-o-gang remix) Year: 1993 Label: Sony Records
- Artist: Cyndi Lauper Title: Time After Time (remix) Year: 1993 Label: Sony Records
- Artist: Praise Title: Love Without Reason (single) Year: 1991 Label: Sony Records
- Artist: Davina Lloyd Title: If I Know Love (single) Year: 1991 Label: DG
- Artist: Genus Title: The Island (single) Year: 1990 Label: white
- Artist: Steve Martland Title: Glad Day (album) Year: 1990 Label: Factory Records

== Releases ==
- The Apprentice: Soundtrack to the BBC Series (EMI, 2007)
