= The Autistic Gardener =

2015 British documentary TV series

- Genre: Documentary
- Presented by: Alan Gardner
- Composer: Dru Masters
- Country of origin: United Kingdom
- Original language: English
- No. of series: 2
- No. of episodes: 7

Production
- Executive producer: Ian Carre
- Producer: Kurt Seywald
- Running time: 45–46 minutes

Original release
- Network: Channel 4
- Release: 8 July 2015 – present

The Autistic Gardener is a British documentary television series that first aired on Channel 4 on 8 July 2015. The series is presented by Alan Gardner, a gardener who is autistic, with help from his friend Anthony. Alan Gardner has won numerous awards at Chelsea, Hampton Court and Tatton Park.

== Episodes ==
| Series | Episodes | Originally aired | |
| Series | Episodes | Series premiere | Series finale |
|---|---|---|---|
| 1 | 4 | 8 July 2015 | 29 July 2015 |
| 2 | 3 | 17 June 2017 | 1 July 2017 |

=== Series 1 ===
| No. | Title | Location | Original release date |
|---|---|---|---|
| 1 | "A Gardner" | Derbyshire | 8 July 2015 |
| 2 | "Ealing Patio Garden" | Ealing | 15 July 2015 |
| 3 | "South London Sound Garden" | South London | 22 July 2015 |
| 4 | "Radical Overhaul" | North-East London | 29 July 2015 |

=== Series 2 ===
| No. | Title | Location | Original release date |
|---|---|---|---|
| 1 | TBA | Lancashire | 17 June 2017 |
| 2 | TBA | Bristol | 24 June 2017 |
| 3 | TBA | London | 1 July 2017 |
