= William Curley =

Scottish patissier and chocolatier

- Born: William Curley; 29 October 1971 (age 54); Methil, Fife, Scotland
- Occupations: Patissier, chocolatier
- Website: williamcurley.com

William Curley (born 29 October 1971) is a Scottish patissier and chocolatier. Curley is the owner of the London chocolate company William Curley Ltd., and has won the Academy of Chocolate's 'Britain's Best Chocolatier' Award four times. In 2012 Curley was named a member of the prestigious pastry association Relais Desserts.

== Early life and career ==
William Curley, the son of a dock-worker, was born and raised in Methil, a small town in Fife. He began his career on the advice of Moysie, with an apprenticeship at Gleneagles Hotel, before moving on to train at numerous Michelin-starred establishments. He has worked amongst many chefs and patissiers in the business, including: Pierre Koffmann at La Tante Claire, Raymond Blanc at Le Manoir aux Quat' Saisons, Marco Pierre White at The Restaurant Hyde Park Hotel (now the Mandarin Oriental Hyde Park, London, Marc Meneau at L'Esperance in Burgundy and Pierre Romeyer at Maison Du Bouche, just outside Brussels. At the age of 27, William then moved to The Savoy[] to become Head Chef Patissier, where he led a team of 21 pastry chefs under Anton Edelman.

== Awards ==
Curley has won a number of awards, including the 'William Heptinstall Award', 'The Craft Guild Pastry Chef of the Year' award, 'Caterer and Hotelkeeper's Acorn Award,’ and 'British Dessert of the Year.'

Curley has won Gold at international culinary competitions and events in Chicago, Luxembourg and Basel, and at the Culinary Olympics in Germany in 2004.

Curley has been named 'Best British Chocolatier' by the Academy of Chocolate four times.

== Shops ==
William Curley opened his first shop in Richmond Upon Thames just off the green in 2004, serving a range of chocolates and patisseries. Following the success of Richmond, a second boutique was opened in November 2009 in Orange Square, Belgravia, London. Boasting the same fine selection of chocolates and patisseries as well as home-made ice cream and a brunch menu, William's Belgravia boutique introduced London's first "dessert bars" where customers can sit at the bar and sample a tasting menu of desserts created in front of them by one of William's chefs. Curley's Belgravia dessert bar featured creations such as Mille-feuille au chocolate - layers of hazelnut dacquoise and chocolate cremeux with an orange sauce, and muscavado ice-cream and then Rhubarbe sable – layers of shortbread sandwiched with rhubarb parfait and topped with berry sorbet, and rhubarb poached in ginger syrup. Both shops closed in early 2016 following a split between the two co-directors.

In the summer of 2011, William Curley opened a chocolate concession at the luxury department store Harrods. His chocolates are available to buy in the Chocolates and Confectionery Room on the ground floor of the store. To celebrate Chocolate Week in October 2010, William held an Afternoon Tea at Claridges Hotel in Mayfair, London, which featured some of William's signature creations including his Venezuelan Cadeaux and Sea Salt Caramel Tart.

William then began a regular Afternoon Tea set with the Halkin Hotel in November 2011 and launched his limited-run Jubilee Afternoon Tea in the Halkin Hotel in June 2012, featuring an Apricot and Ginger Macaron Crown. In the summer of 2012, William collaborated with the V&A Victoria and Albert Museum in London to celebrate their Ballgowns British Glamour exhibition. William selected four gowns and created 4 patisseries, available as part of Harrods' 'Best of British' Afternoon Tea range in their Tea Room during the Jubilee.

== Masterclasses & Workshops ==
William and his chefs provide chocolate masterclasses and workshops, where participants learn the basics of chocolate making. William also holds demonstrations and classes at Divertimenti Cookery School. The William Curley team was also the first ever to hold chocolate making classes at Harrods in May 2012, encouraging participants to get hands-on working with chocolate, in the Harrods Gourmet Cook Shop.

== Publicity ==
To commemorate the Queen's Diamond Jubilee in May/June 2012, William and his team created a chocolate crown displayed in the window of the luxury department store, Harrods.

In March 2012 William was invited to participate in Faberge's charity event The Big Egg Hunt to raise money for Action for Children and Elephant Family. William and his team created a giant chocolate egg measuring 1.5 metres. This egg was featured in the window of Fortnum & Mason during the hunt and on 20 March 2012 fetched £7,000 at a charity auction making it the most expensive edible chocolate Easter Egg ever sold at auction.

William regularly takes part in events and charity dinners and also appeared in the television series, Raymond Blanc's Kitchen Secrets, in early 2010.

== Books ==
- Nostalgic Delights: Classic Confections & Timeless Treats - 16 Oct 2016 - co-author Kevin Summers;
- Patisserie: A Masterclass in Classic and Contemporary Patisserie - 22 May 2014 - co-author - Susan Curley;
- Couture Chocolate: A Masterclass in Chocolate - 25 Oct 2013 - co-author - Jose Lasheras
