= James Knight-Pacheco =

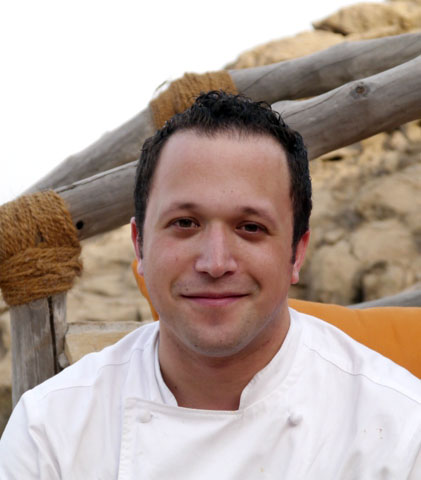
- James Knight-Pacheco
- Born: Venezuela
- Culinary career
- Current restaurant: Cove Beach as group executive chef

James Knight-Pacheco is a television personality who has appeared in cooking shows on the BBC. Knight-Pacheco and Alasdair Hooper were the runners-up in Raymond Blanc's BBC Two programme The Restaurant. Blanc offered them both a job at Le Manoir aux Quat' Saisons. In 2010, Knight-Pacheco and Hooper hosted a BBC Two series on event catering Out of the Frying Pan.

Knight-Pacheco became the executive chef at ME by Melia, Dubai.

In June 2022, Knight-Pacheco was appointed group executive chef with AMZ Group, working across Cove Beach in both Dubai and Abu Dhabi.
