= Paul Heathcote =

Paul Heathcote MBE
- Born: 3 October 1960 (age 65); Bolton, Lancashire, England
- Occupations: chef and restaurant owner
- Height: 5 ft 11 in (180 cm)
- Title: MBE
- Children: 2

Paul Heathcote (born 3 October 1960) is a chef, restaurateur and food consultant who spent two years under the guidance of Raymond Blanc at Le Manoir aux Quat' Saisons. He has appeared on many UK food television shows. Heathcote is one of only two chefs in the North West of England ever to hold two Michelin stars, which he held at his Longridge restaurant, founded in 1990. He sold the last of his restaurant group in 2015 and at one period owned 15 restaurants as well as an events and contract catering business.

Heathcote is a triple Catey winner and previous winner of the Egon Ronay Chef of the Year.

Heathcotes Outside catered for contracts at a number of sporting stadia including Liverpool F.C., Preston North End, Warrington Rugby League, Sale Sharks, Chester Racecourse, and concerts at the Liverpool Arena. The business was sold to Lindley in 2007 and he remained with the main board until its sale to Centerplate in 2013. Heathcote has returned into event catering with Heathcote&Co. Heathcote&Co continue to hold a contract to cater at Manchester International Festival, the Macron Stadium (home of Bolton Wanderers Football Club), 125-bedroom Bolton Whites Hotel and workplace canteen Social Mess. Bolton Wanderers have been awarded gold for the best food and hospitality in any medium-sized stadium in the UK 2017 and third, bronze, in the country for 2017. Heathcote&Co had previously been awarded Silver in 2015 and 2016 by Stadium Events and Hospitality Awards.

He is the author of two books, Paul Heathcote's Rhubarb and Black Pudding (with Matthew Fort) and Heathcotes at Home.

He hails from Bolton, Lancashire, and supports the town's football club, Bolton Wanderers.

Heathcote was appointed Member of the Order of the British Empire (MBE) in the 2009 Birthday Honours.
