= Great Milton =

Village in Oxfordshire, England

Coordinates: 51.720°N 1.087°W

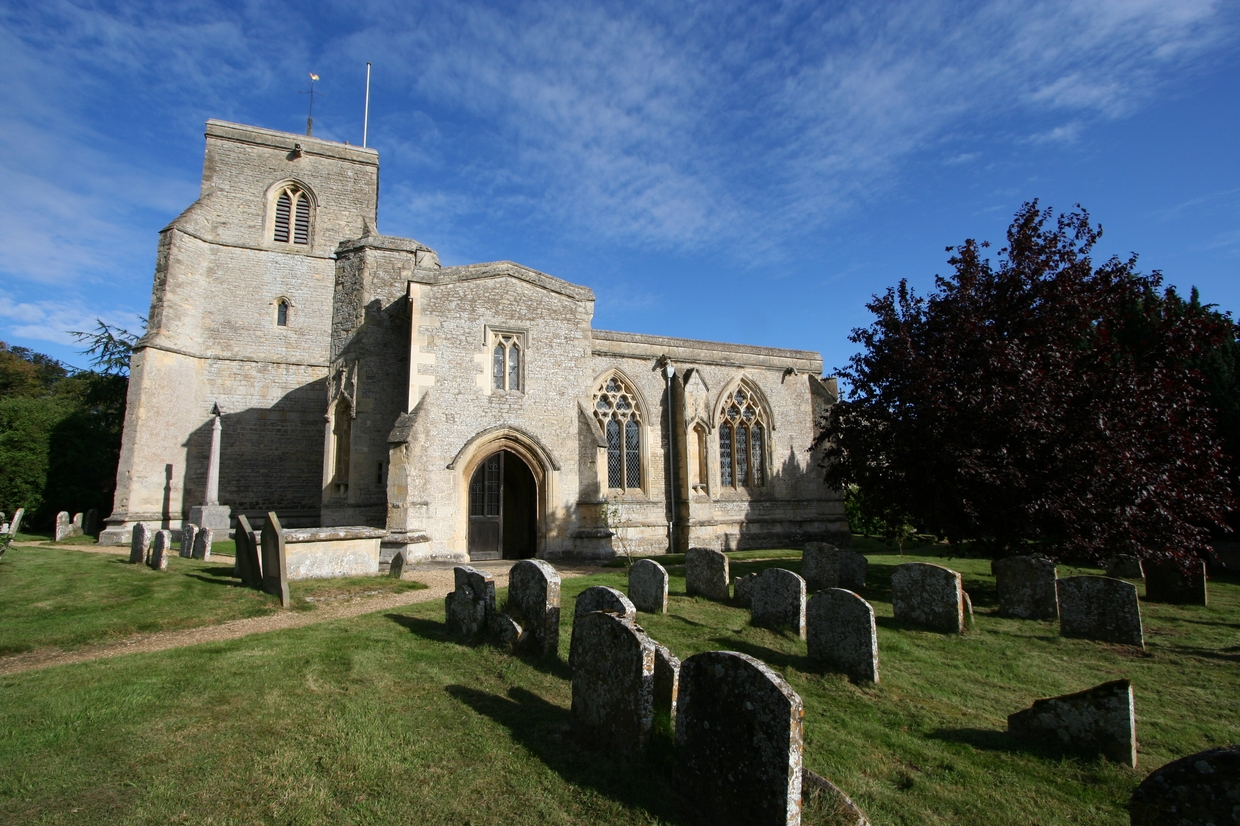
- St Mary the Virgin parish church

- Location within Oxfordshire
- Area: 7.90 km^{2} (3.05 sq mi)
- Population: 1,042 (2011 census)
  - Density: 132/km^{2} (340/sq mi)
- OS grid reference: SP6302
- Civil parish: Great Milton
- District: South Oxfordshire
- Shire county: Oxfordshire
- Region: South East
- Country: England
- Sovereign state: United Kingdom
- Post town: Oxford
- Postcode district: OX44
- Dialling code: 01844
- Police: Thames Valley
- Fire: Oxfordshire
- Ambulance: South Central
- UK Parliament: Henley and Thame
- Website: Great Milton, Oxfordshire

Great Milton is a village and civil parish in Oxfordshire, about 7 miles (11 km) east of Oxford. The 2011 census recorded the parish's population as 1,042.

== The School ==
Great Milton church of England primary school is a prominent part of the village community with the only village tennis courts.

== History ==
The Domesday Book of 1086 records that Remigius de Fécamp, Bishop of Lincoln held a large estate of 31 hides of land at Great Milton. The estate had presumably belonged to the Diocese of Dorchester, of which Remigius had been consecrated bishop in 1070. The see of Dorchester had been absorbed into that of Lincoln in 1072, and Remigius had been translated to Lincoln as bishop of the newly united diocese.

The Domesday Book lists two water mills in the parish. By the time of the Hundred Rolls in 1279 there was a third watermill and in about 1500 there was a fourth mill. There is no known subsequent record of the third and fourth mills, but both of the others seem to have survived until the 17th century and in at least one case the 18th century. By the end of 19th century both mills were disused.

Great Milton had a post mill with four sails. In about 1901 Henry Taunt photographed it, by which time it had lost one pair of sails and appeared derelict.

In 1762 a fire destroyed 16 houses in the village.

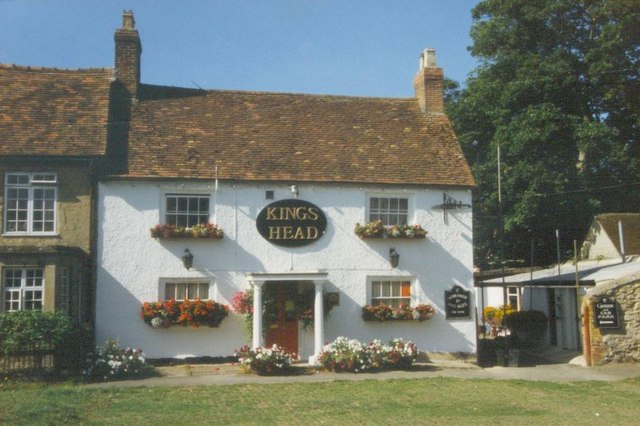
The King's Head public house, 1989, now a private house

By 1822 the parish had at least four public houses: the Bell, the Bull, the King's Head and the Red Lion. The Bell, King's Head and Red Lion had all ceased trading by the 1990s. Greene King Brewery controlled The Bull until 2013, when 110 villagers including chef Raymond Blanc bought it and turned it into a community pub.

== Churches ==
=== Parish church ===
The nave and chancel of the Church of England parish church of Saint Mary were built shortly after the Norman Conquest of England. The building was damaged by fire in the 13th century. During the 14th century the chancel was enlarged and the north and south aisles were added. At this time the church served a parish including the villages of Chilworth Valery and Chilworth Muzzard, the hamlets of Combe and Little Milton, and the manor of Ascot. In 1850 St Mary's was restored at a cost of £2,000.

In 1552 St Mary's had four bells plus a Sanctus bell, and in 1631 Ellis I Knight of Reading, Berkshire cast a ring of five bells. It now has a ring of eight. Ellis II & Henry III Knight recast what are now the fifth and eighth bells in 1673. Thomas Rudhall of Gloucester cast the treble, second and third bells in 1771 and the tenor bell in 1772. In 1848 William Taylor of Loughborough, who at that time also had a foundry at Oxford, cast the sixth bell. In 1825 W & J Taylor of Loughborough also cast the present Sanctus bell.

St Mary's has a church clock that was made in 1699 by Nicholas Harris of Fritwell.

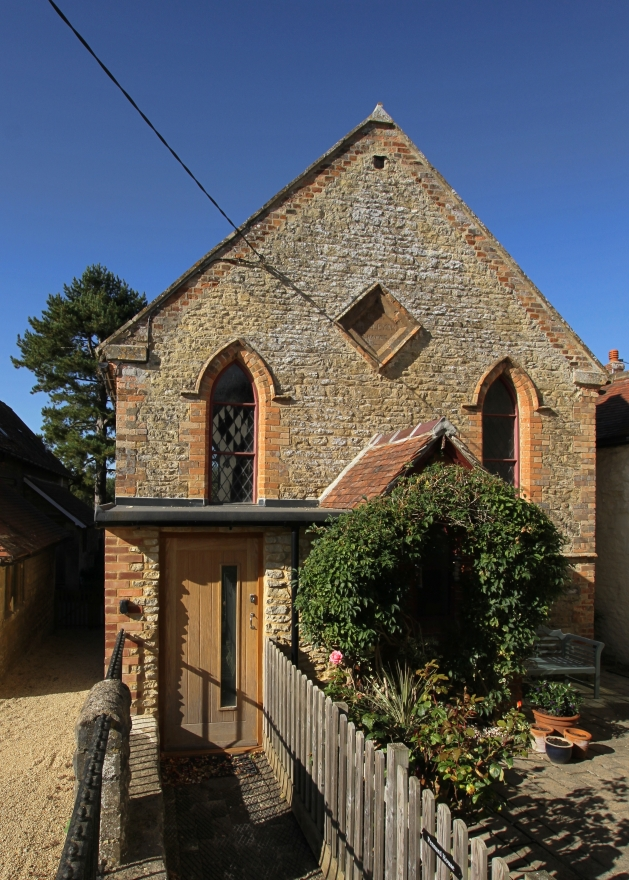
Methodist church in High Street

=== Methodist church ===
Great Milton Methodist church was built in 1842 as a Wesleyan chapel. It is a member of the Oxford Methodist Circuit.

== Notable historic houses ==
The oldest part of Great Milton Manor House is 15th-century. The south wing was rebuilt around 1600, and the north wing later in the 17th century. In 1908 the house was doubled in size to designs by the architect EP Warren. In 1984 Raymond Blanc had the house converted into Le Manoir aux Quat'Saisons hotel and restaurant. It is a Grade II* listed building.

The Priory is a 16th- and 17th-century Tudor and Jacobean house in Church Road, said to have been built for Herbert Westfaling and later to have been the home of John Thurloe. It is a Grade II* listed building.

Pettits House is an early 17th-century Jacobean house in the High Street. In 1854 a school room and a bell gable were added to the north side to accommodate a National School for the parish. In the 20th century the parish school moved to new premises and the school room was converted into a house. It is a Grade II* listed building.

The Great House was built around 1720. It has a seven-bay front facing the parish church. In 1788 the politician Richard Ryder had a south wing added, almost certainly designed by James Wyatt. It is a Grade II* listed building.

== Amenities ==
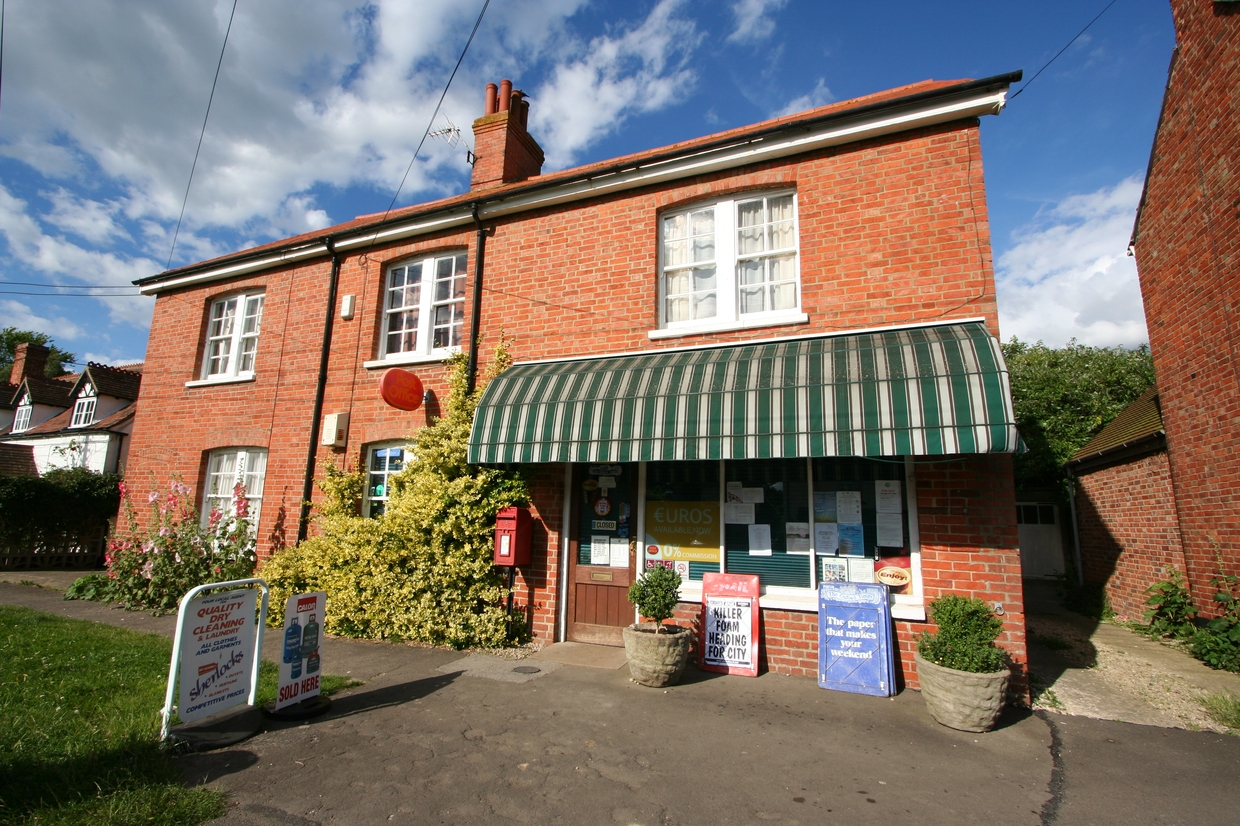
Post Office in High Street

The village has a Church of England Primary School, a public house, The Bull, and a post office and general store. The Manor House is now Raymond Blanc's restaurant and hotel, Le Manoir aux Quat'Saisons.

Great Milton has two bus services. Oxford Bus Company route 46 links the village with central Oxford via Wheatley, Horspath and Cowley. Buses run hourly, seven days a week, from early morning until after midnight. Red Rose Travel route 275 serves the village six days a week, once each morning on the way to Oxford and once each afternoon on the way back to High Wycombe. It does not serve Great Milton on Sundays or Bank Holidays.

== Sports ==
The village was the original base of Great Milton Hockey Club, a mixed-sex field hockey team that plays annually in the Oxfordshire Gladiators' Cup.

== Notable residents ==
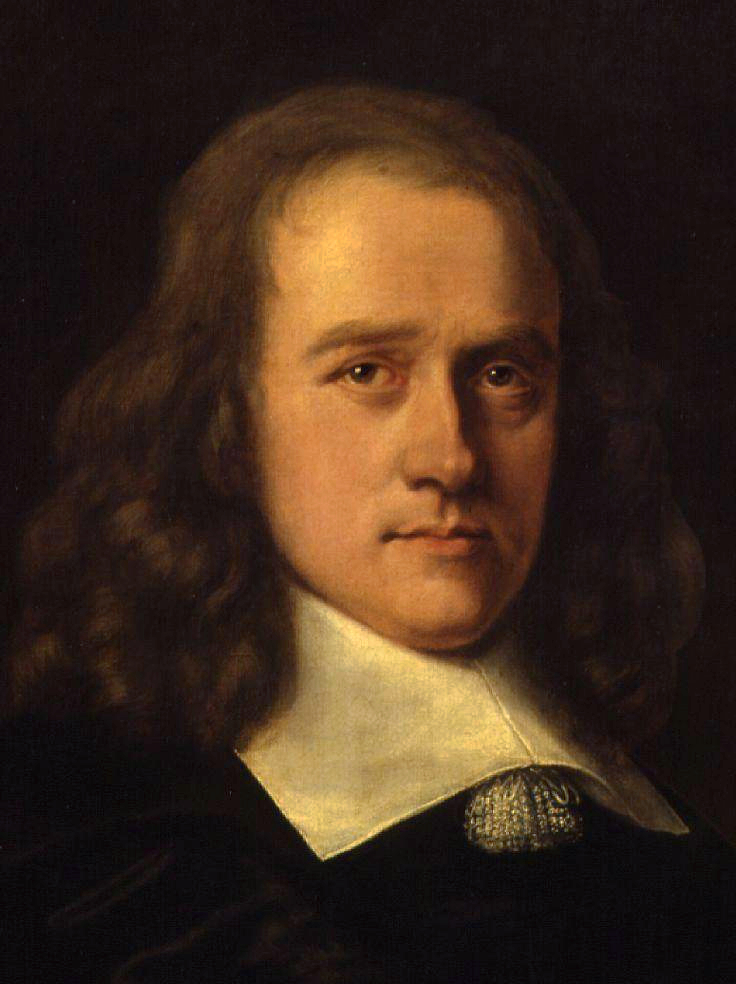
John Thurloe, painted in 1896

- Raymond Blanc (born 1949), chef patron at Le Manoir aux Quat' Saisons, a hotel-restaurant in the village
- Sinclair Hood, archaeologist and academic. (1917–2021)
- Michael de Larrabeiti (1934–2008), an English novelist and travel writer, lived in the village.
- Peter Lawrence (1913–2005), a master at Eton College and an author, retired to Great Milton in 1977.
- Sir Tim Rice (born 1944), lyricist and author.
- Richard Ryder (1766–1832), politician, Home Secretary between 1809 and 1812.
- Thomas Skynner (17281789), Archdeacon of Totnes from 1772 until 1775.
- William Speechly (1735–1819), horticulturalist and early cultivator of pineapples and grapes in the UK.
- John Thurloe (1616–68), Secretary of State under Oliver Cromwell.
- Sir Martin Wood CBE, FRS, (1927–2021), an engineer.
- Dr Peter Zinovieff (1933–2021), composer, musician, inventor and engineer

== Sources ==
- Beeson, CFC (1989) [1962]. Simcock, AV (ed.). Clockmaking in Oxfordshire 1400–1850 (3rd ed.). Oxford: Museum of the History of Science. pp. 46–47. ISBN 0-903364-06-9.
- Emery, Frank (1974). Hoskins, WG (ed.). The Oxfordshire Landscape. The Making of the English Landscape. London: Hodder & Stoughton. pp. 117, 167, 218. ISBN 0-340-04301-6.
- Graham, Malcolm (1973). Henry Taunt of Oxford: A Victorian Photographer. Headington: Oxford Illustrated Press. ISBN 0-902280-14-7.
- Lobel, Mary D, ed. (1962). "Great Milton". A History of the County of Oxford. Victoria County History. Vol. VII: Thame and Dorchester Hundreds. London: Oxford University Press for the Institute of Historical Research. pp. 117–146.
- Sherwood, Jennifer; Pevsner, Nikolaus (1974). Oxfordshire. The Buildings of England. Harmondsworth: Penguin Books. pp. 620–623. ISBN 0-14-071045-0.
