= The Restaurant (British TV series) series 1 =

The Restaurant
- Season 1
- Contestants
- Starring: Jeremy & Jane; Laura & Jess; Grant & Laura; Lloyd & Adwoa; Martin & Emma; Ed & Mike; Tom & Nicola; Sam & Jacqui; Chris & Jade
- No. of episodes: 8

Release
- Original network: BBC Two

Series chronology
- Next → Series 2

The first series of The Restaurant was broadcast in the United Kingdom from 29 August to 17 October in 2007. The programme aired on Tuesdays and Wednesdays at 8 pm on BBC Two, over a total of fifteen episodes. It marked the start of a three-series run for the concept.

This show is airing as Last Restaurant Standing in the US on BBC America from February to May 2008.

The winners, Jeremy and Jane Hooper, beat eight other couples to win the chance to set up their own restaurant backed by French chef and restaurateur Raymond Blanc. The couple ran their restaurant, Eight at the Thatch, at Thame, Oxfordshire from November 2007 until May 2008.

== Contestants ==
Chris and Jade are a couple from Edinburgh. Both were studying hospitality management at university at the time of their appearance on the show. The couple's Oxford-based restaurant, Studio New York, was the first to be closed in the series after a challenge to hold a function. The couple did admit to Raymond that they missed Scotland and wanted to be closer to home, but would continue to follow their dream.

Brothers Ed and Mike ran The Treacle Well in Watlington, Oxfordshire. Their concept was to produce simple, traditional food. They were eliminated in the fourth week after a challenge to cater for a banquet at Blenheim Palace.

Grant and Laura are a couple from Deptford. The couple have a young baby and, at the time of appearing on the show, were expecting another. They operated a restaurant in Windsor, known as Jacques Tamson's which served a combination of French and Scottish cuisine. In week seven, they were eliminated from the competition after a challenge to run Raymond Blanc's own restaurant, Le Manoir aux Quat' Saisons.

Jeremy and Jane are a couple from Devon. Jeremy is an ex-Royal Marines corporal whilst his wife Jane is a trainee teacher. Their concept behind their restaurant, Eight in the Country, was to provide customers with a lasting memory of good service. The couple, on occasions, didn't see eye to eye, Jeremy not being very organised outside of the kitchen and Jane feeling she had little support at times. But despite having spent much time apart due to Jeremy's job they were extremely close. Jeremy's determination to be the winner paid off and he and Jane beat Jess and Laura in the final. Jeremy was called 'the best cook in the competition' by Lee Cash, an inspector, and was very relaxed. His wife, Jane was very organised but was often overcome with emotion.

Jess and Laura are twin sisters from London and both work as children's entertainers. They operated Brown & Green, a restaurant serving organic cuisine in Aylesbury. They came second overall, losing to Jeremy and Jane in the final.

In November 2009 they were looking for a location to open their Brown & Green café. The sisters have now opened several branches of Brown & Green in London, including Crystal Palace, Gipsy Hill and Sydenham.

Lloyd and Adwoa are an engaged couple from London. Outside of the show, the couple run a Ghanaian catering company, a cuisine which they brought to their restaurant on the show. Spinach & Agushi was located in Englefield Green, Surrey and was closed in week six after a challenge to host a singles night. Lloyd was criticised for not being enough of a personality front of house, but this improved with time. Their food was constantly praised and Adwoa was praised for her dishes by Raymond and the inspectors even though she lacked in confidence.

Engaged couple Martin and Emma from Bolton took over Veritas Wine Bar and Bistro, a restaurant in Banbury, to run it under the name Bravo! serving traditional English cuisine. Raymond Blanc eliminated the couple in week five after a challenge to create a microwavable meal. The couple were not as professional as other contestants- Emma, on numerous occasions, disclosed a little too much detail to her customers, especially when it came to serving the eels.

Newly weds Sam and Jacqui operated The Ostrich in Fairford, a restaurant with live jazz entertainment. which was closed in the second week after a challenge to run a canteen. Sam appeared to be much more interested in his band than attempting to run a successful restaurant whilst Jacqui tried desperately to hold things together front of house. Sam's inexperience as a chef was more than obvious and he couldn't accept criticism gracefully. He constantly blamed others for his own errors.

Son and mother Tom and Nicola, from Norfolk, ran Monks in Shipton. Their restaurant was closed in week three after a challenge to hold a local history themed night. Nicola wasn't suited to cooking in a restaurant, very much the house-wife cook she lacked control of her kitchen.

== Winners ==
Jeremy and Jane Hooper won The Restaurant. They were supported by Raymond Blanc and The Peach Pub company in opening and running a restaurant in Thame, Oxfordshire. Blanc was personally financially supporting the new restaurant, sinking a six figure sum into it. Formerly known as The Old Trout Inn, it opened as Eight at the Thatch on 6 November 2007.

After a period of maternity/paternity leave, Jeremy and Jane stepped down and left Eight at the Thatch, on 5 May 2008 their brief tenure marked by reported rampant arguments and failure.

== Episodes ==
=== Week One ===
- Task: Restaurants opening weekend
- Restaurant of the week: Jeremy and Jane
- In challenge: Chris and Jade, Lloyd and Adwoa, Sam and Jacqui
- Challenge: Organising a function
- Eliminated: Chris and Jade

=== Week Two ===
- Task: Make profits from cocktails and desserts
- Restaurant of the week: Jess and Laura
- In challenge: Sam and Jacqui, Martin and Emma, Tom and Nicola
- Challenge: Canteen catering
- Eliminated: Sam and Jacqui

=== Week Three ===
- Task: Cater for families, by creating marketing strategies and suitable food
- Restaurant of the week: Lloyd and Adwoa
- In challenge: Tom and Nicola, Grant and Laura, Jeremy and Jane
- Challenge: Evening of local food with a local history theme
- Eliminated: Tom and Nicola

=== Week Four ===
- Task: Sell as may dishes as possible with Raymond's surprise ingredient, eel
- Restaurant of the week: Jess and Laura
- In challenge: Ed and Mike, Martin and Emma, Lloyd and Adwoa
- Challenge: Cater for a banquet at Blenheim Palace
- Eliminated: Ed and Mike

=== Week Five ===
- Task: Create a distinctive brand that sells itself
- Restaurant of the week: Grant and Laura
- In challenge: Martin and Emma, Jeremy and Jane, Jess and Laura
- Challenge: Create ready meals for supermarkets
- Eliminated: Martin and Emma

=== Week Six ===
- Task: Delight and surprise customers, make them feel special. Increase covers and table turnover.
- Restaurant of the week: Jeremy and Jane
- In challenge: Lloyd and Adwoa, Grant and Laura
- Challenge: Host a Singles Night.
- Eliminated:Lloyd and Adwoa

=== Week Seven ===
- Task: Impress Raymond when he comes to the Restaurant.
- Restaurant of the week: Jeremy and Jane
- In challenge: Grant and Laura, Jess and Laura
- Challenge: Work in Raymond's Restaurant.
- Eliminated: Grant and Laura

=== Week Eight ===
- Task: Open the Restaurant in Raymond's home town and impress his mother.
- Eliminated: Jess and Laura
- Winners of the Restaurant: Jeremy and Jane

== Weekly results ==
Contestants	Week								Result
Contestants	1	2	3	4	5	6	7	8	Result
Jeremy and Jane									Winners
Jess and Laura									Runners-up
Grant and Laura									Eliminated Week Seven
Lloyd and Adwoa									Eliminated Week Six
Martin and Emma									Eliminated Week Five
Ed and Mike									Eliminated Week Four
Tom and Nicola									Eliminated Week Three
Sam and Jacqui									Eliminated Week Two
Chris and Jade									Eliminated Week One
Contestants	1	2	3	4	5	6	7	8	Result
Contestants	Week								Result

Legend
Finale
Restaurant of the week
In challenge

== See also ==
- The Restaurant (British series 2)
