= Elisha Carter =

British chef

Elisha Carter (born 6 October 1969) is a British chef who appeared in the BBC television series Great British Menu in 2008. He is Head Chef at The Landau restaurant located in The Langham, London.

== Biography ==
Carter was born in North London, and got his love of food from his mother. He went to Pimlico School where he studied Home Economics at General Certificate of Education O-Level and for a Certificate of Pre-Vocational Education in Hospitality. As part of his studies, he went on a work experience placement for two weeks to Shell House to work in the directors' private dining room, which prompted him to decide to be a chef.

Carter started his career with a two-year apprenticeship at the Ritz Hotel. He then became a commis chef at the Gleneagles Hotel in Scotland where he stayed for over a year, and in 1992, he went to work at John Burton Race's two-Michelin-starred restaurant L'Ortolan in Reading, Berkshire. Burton Race sent him to train with Raymond Blanc at his two-Michelin-starred restaurant Le Manoir aux Quat' Saisons in Oxfordshire and at Ledoyen in Paris. In 1997, Carter returned to London to work at Leith's restaurant and then for Richard Corrigan at Lyndsay House, Soho, and at the Foliage restaurant at the Mandarin Oriental Hotel. He came to prominence as head chef at Lola's in Islington in 2003, where his signature dish was Duck Three Ways, a boned duck separated into three parts, with each cooked in a different way. He later became the head chef at the Silk restaurant at the Courthouse Hotel Kempinski in Great Marlborough Street, and then head chef at the Sharpham Park restaurant at Charlton House hotel in Somerset. He was awarded the "Somerset Life" Chef of the year 2007 and awarded the Silver Medal for Bath chef of the year 2007. In September 2008 he moved to The Landau's kitchens and in October 2009 became Head Chef.

Giles Coren, restaurant critic of The Times, described him in 2005 as being "...a young chef of mercurial genius...". Carter featured on the BBC television programme Indian Food Made Easy, and appeared in the BBC television series Great British Menu in 2008, where he lost to Chris Horridge, head chef at The Bath Priory hotel, in the South West region final.
