= David Goodridge =

David Goodridge, is the Chef de Cuisine of the venerable Gaddi's restaurant at the Peninsula Hong Kong hotel.

He joined Le Manoir aux Quat' Saisons, a two-Michelin-starred restaurant in Oxfordshire, England, owned by one of the world's finest chefs Raymond Blanc, as a commis pâtissier at the age of 18. He was promoted to the position of Senior Sous Chef after five-year time and became the Senior Sous Chef at the age of just 25. Goodridge also spent time in the kitchen at Le Maison Troisgros, Restaurant Pierre Gagnaire and La Côte D'Or, all three-star Michelin restaurants.

In 1999, Goodridge was honoured with the 1999 Acorn High Achievers Award by Caterer and Hotel Magazine, the award acknowledging young achievers aged under 30. He also won three gold medals and two silvers in Salon Culinaire national competitions.

After spending eight years in Le Manoir, Goodridge worked in Tokyo and Tokushima, under respected chef Koyama Hirohisa at his eponymous restaurants. In 2004, he received an offer to helm the Gaddi's team and had become head chef at Gaddi's restaurant in 2005.
