= Pied à Terre (restaurant) =

London restaurant

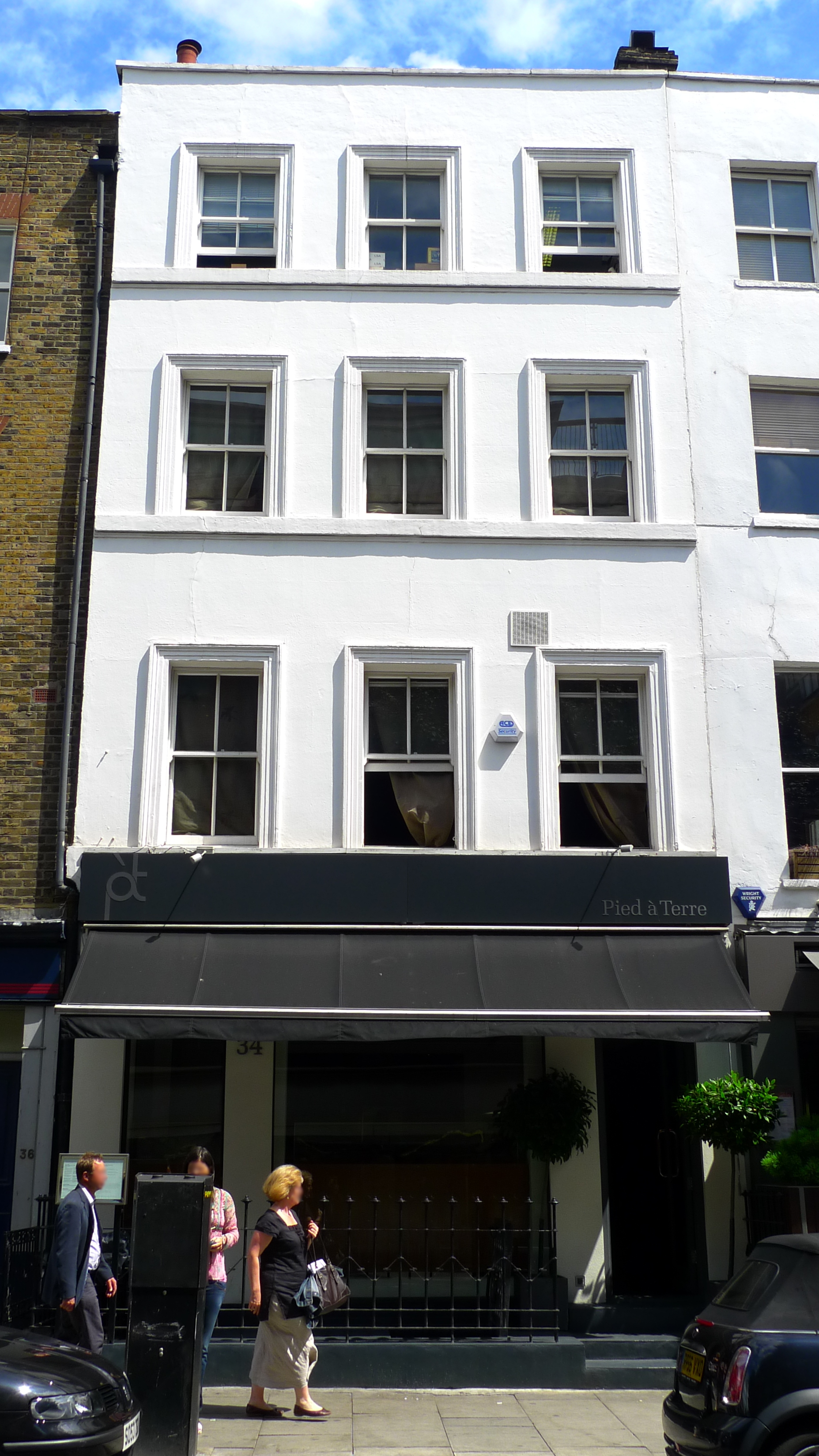
- Pied à Terre in 2009

- Location within Central London

Restaurant information
- Established: 1991; 35 years ago
- Owner: David Moore
- Head chef: Aggelos Kassais
- Food type: Classic French technique with delicate, fresh and light touch
- Dress code: Smart Casual
- Rating: (Michelin Guide); AA Rosettes
- Location: 34 Charlotte St, London, W1, W1T 2NH, United Kingdom
- Coordinates: 51°31′8.5″N 0°8′7″W
- Seating capacity: 40
- Reservations: Yes
- Other information: Nearest station: Goodge Street
- Website: www.pied-a-terre.co.uk

Pied à Terre is a Michelin starred French restaurant in Fitzrovia in central London.

The restaurant is owned by David Moore who founded the restaurant in 1991, with Richard Neat as the first head chef. Moore has contributed to television programmes such as BBC's The Restaurant and Masterchef.

== History ==
Pied à Terre is the longest standing independently owned Michelin starred restaurant in London. It was founded in 1991 and is still owned and run by David Moore.

Pied à Terre opened in December 1991 by David Moore and chef Richard Neat and was awarded a Michelin star in their first guide and a second Michelin star in 1996. Moore invited Tom Aikens, sous chef to Neat to become head chef, when Neat moved on. Aikens remained head chef with two stars, until December 1999 when his sous chef Shane Osborn took the reins. Pied à Terre regained the second star in 2003 and maintained it until Osborn's departure in 2011. Since 2011, Pied à Terre has maintained one Michelin star.

In 2004, a faulty part fitted to an ice machine started a fire in the middle of the night. Pied à Terre was closed, the roof was off, the staircase dropped, a dangerous buildings order was imposed and it took 10 months to rebuild and reopen. Moore kept the whole team on sending them to gain experience elsewhere and Pied à Terre re-opened in September 2005.

2007 saw Moore open L'Autre Pied on Blandford Street, Marylebone, with chef Marcus Eaves. L'Autre Pied was to be a local, casual restaurant but was awarded a Michelin star in the first year. In 2011 on the departure of Osborn, Eaves returned to Charlotte Street and Andy McFadden another Pied à Terre chef took over at Blandford Street. Andy returned as Head Chef to Charlotte Street in 2015. McFadden now runs Michelin starred Glovers Alley in Dublin. Asimakis Chaniotis became Head Chef, having joined the Pied à Terre group in 2012 as a chef de Partie (section chef).

== See also ==
- List of French restaurants
