= Sarah Willingham =

British entrepreneur and investor

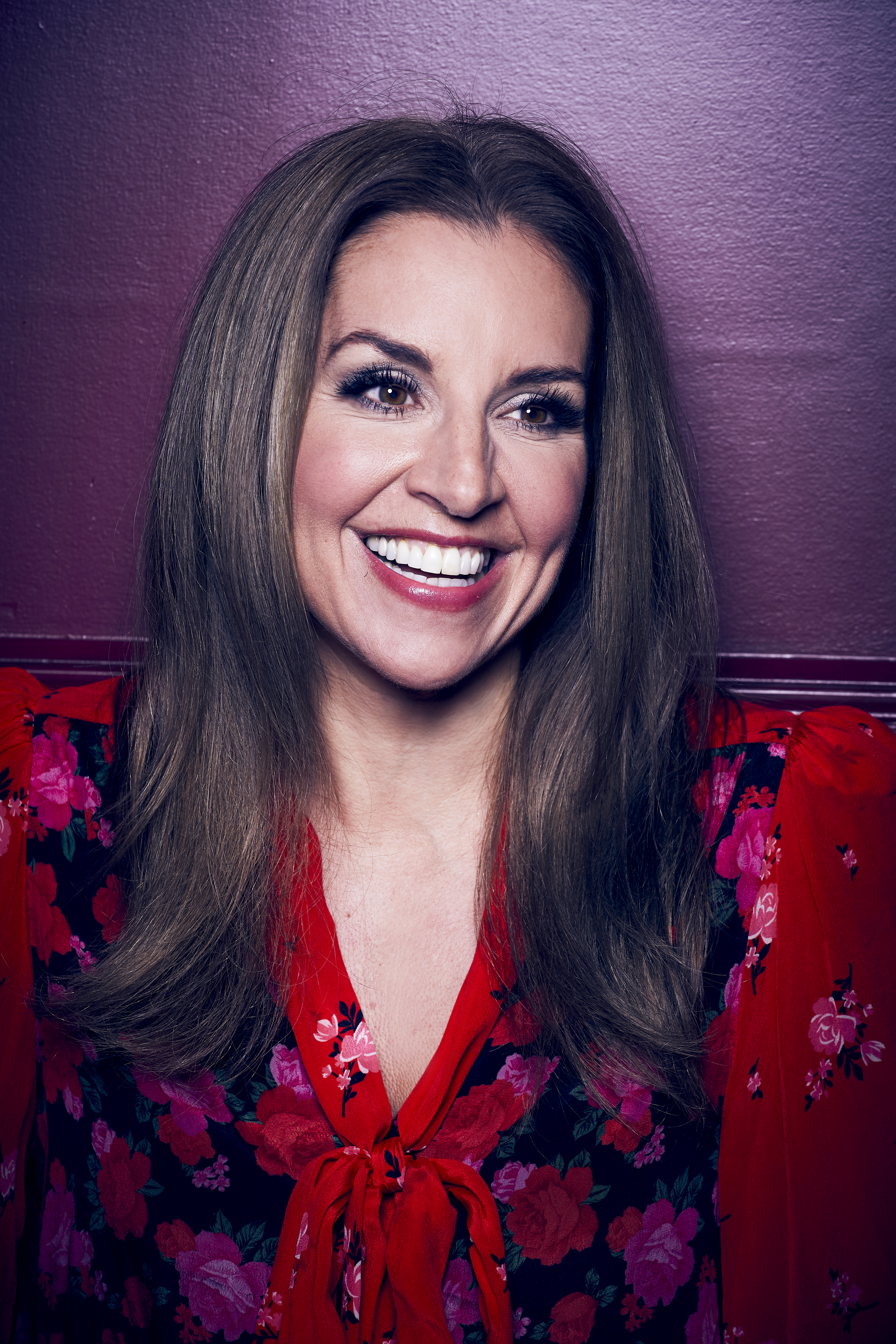
- Born: Sarah Louise Willingham; 21 December 1973 (age 52); Newcastle-under-Lyme, Staffordshire, England
- Education: Cranfield University; Oxford Brookes University; École supérieure de commerce de La Rochelle
- Occupations: Entrepreneur, serial investor and founder of Nightcap
- Television: The Restaurant; Dragons' Den
- Spouse: Michael Willingham-Toxvaerd (m. 2008)
- Children: 4
- Website: www.sarahwillingham.com

Sarah Louise Willingham (born 20 December 1973) is a British entrepreneur, serial investor, founder and CEO of Nightcap, with extensive experience in the hospitality industry.

== Education ==
Willingham has two business degrees from Oxford Brookes University and the École supérieure de commerce de La Rochelle. In 2004 she completed an MBA at the Cranfield University School of Management. Willingham attended Newcastle-under-Lyme School during high school located in her home town of Newcastle under Lyme, Staffordshire.

== Career ==
=== Businesses ===
Willingham spent the early years of her career managing some restaurants including Chessageed Delights, Planet Hollywood and Pizza Express.

In partnership with The Clapham House Group, she bought The Bombay Bicycle Club in 2004, and expanded the company, making it the largest Indian restaurant chain in the United Kingdom. Willingham sold her share back to The Clapham House Group in 2007 where she continued as a main board director responsible for three of their four brands (Tootsies, The Real Greek and The Bombay Bicycle Club) with over 50 restaurants and more than 1,500 employees.

In 2004, Willingham co-established an AIM-listed company, Neutrahealth plc, which acquired six businesses in the vitamin and mineral supplements industry and was sold to Indian company Elder Pharmaceuticals Ltd in 2011.

In April 2008, she co-established a private equity platform in the UK.

In 2010, Willingham invested in the London Cocktail Club. The first cocktail bar opened in 2011 on Goodge Street, London. In February 2012 the London Cocktail Club added their second cocktail bar on Shaftesbury Avenue, Their third opened in Great Portland Street, London in 2013.

Management Today named her as one of the "35 most successful women under 35" in the UK. In January 2016, Willingham was named one of The Sunday Times' 500 Most Influential people in Britain. In 2017 Willingham received an honorary doctorate from Staffordshire University and in 2018 she received honorary doctorates from Cranfield University and Oxford Brookes University in recognition of her contribution to business and entrepreneurship.

In 2021 Willingham, with husband Michael, founded bar group Nightcap PLC. The company was previously listed on AIM and was a "one to watch" in 2021. In 2023 Sarah won Business Leader of the Year at the Publican Awards. In 2025 Sarah and her husband Michael acquired Brighton's iconic tower the i360 out of administration.

=== Television ===
Willingham was a restaurant inspector and investor on three series of Raymond Blanc's The Restaurant and as an independent investor on the Sky television series Cooks to Market.

She has appeared on various TV programmes, including GMB, This Morning, BBC Breakfast, GB News, ITV News and Sky News.

In March 2015, Willingham was named as one of the new "Dragons" on the BBC television programme Dragons' Den from the thirteenth series which began airing in July 2015. She returned to Dragons' Den for the fourteenth series, beginning in July 2016. She appeared for two seasons.

In September 2016, Willingham took part in a celebrity episode of The Chase.

== Personal life ==
Sarah and her husband Michael live in Brighton and London with their four children.
