= The Restaurant (British TV series) =

British television series, 2007–2009

- The title screen of The Restaurant
- Genre: Reality television series
- Starring: Raymond Blanc
- Narrated by: Alex Jennings (2007); Barbara Flynn (2008)
- Theme music composer: Dru Masters
- Country of origin: United Kingdom
- Original language: English
- No. of series: 3
- No. of episodes: 30

Production
- Running time: 60 minute episodes

Original release
- Network: BBC Two
- Release: 29 August 2007 – 17 December 2009

The Restaurant is a British reality television series which is based on the Australian television show My Restaurant Rules, where a group of couples competes for the chance to set up a restaurant financially backed and personally supported by French chef Raymond Blanc. The winning couple was given their own restaurant to run. For the winners of the first series, the prize restaurant was in Oxfordshire, near Blanc's own Le Manoir aux Quat' Saisons. For the second series, it was in Marlow, Buckinghamshire.

The first series aired on BBC Two on 29 August 2007 and a second series aired on 10 September 2008. The first series also had a spin-off, The Restaurant: You're Fried! (a play on The Apprentice: You're Fired!) which aired on BBC Three after the main programme; it did not return for either of the subsequent series. The third and final series was broadcast on 29 October 2009.

In the US, the show was retitled Last Restaurant Standing by BBC America. The first series aired in spring 2008, the second in spring 2009, and the third in winter 2010.

In July 2010, the BBC announced that the show has officially ended.

== Format ==
Nine couples with little or no restaurant experience competed in a series of challenges whilst running their own restaurants. Challenges were set by Raymond Blanc, a successful French chef who owns a number of restaurants in the UK, most notably Le Manoir aux Quat' Saisons. The couples lived together in a shared house during the eight-week series.

Each week, Blanc set a task, such as to make as much profit from selling cocktails or desserts. Each couple's restaurant was visited by Blanc's "inspectors" – restaurant industry experts David Moore and Sarah Willingham – who reported back to Blanc on the service, food and organisation of each. There was then a "boardroom" showdown in which each couple was given individual feedback. All couples were then called in together and the "Restaurant of the Week" award was presented to the couple deemed to have performed the best during the task. Blanc then named the three (or two in later episodes) poorest performing couples that would perform a further challenge.

In the specific challenge, the three couples chose or were assigned helpers from amongst the other contestants. They then competed again in tasks such as selling the most meals in a cafeteria. The couple deemed to be the worst-performing were eliminated by Blanc, with the line "I'm closing your restaurant".

For its first two series, The Restaurant was shown twice a week; the first being the task in which all couples took part, and the second being the challenge and subsequent elimination of one couple. In the third series, this was reduced to one episode a week.

The theme music was written by Dru Masters. Other music used included "Waltz No. 2" from Shostakovich's Jazz Suite, '"Showtime" from the Magnolia soundtrack composed by Jon Brion, and "Middlesex Times" from the Donnie Darko soundtrack composed by Michael Andrews. Some music from the Amelie soundtrack was used the series. "Let's Groove Again" by Gonzales was used as the music for the programme's promotional trailer.

== History ==
The BBC announced the production of The Restaurant in October 2006, with chef and restaurateur Raymond Blanc named as the star of the series. Blanc invested a six-figure sum of money into the programme, and was described as being "very excited" about the series. The first series began airing on 29 August 2007 and drew to a close on 17 October 2007. The series saw married couple Jeremy and Jane Hooper win the chance to set up their own restaurant, Eight at the Thatch, in the Oxfordshire town Thame, which opened in November 2007. After a period of maternity/paternity leave, Jeremy and Jane stepped down and left Eight at the Thatch, on 5 May, 2008 with their former head chef reporting the couple had been treated badly.

On 28 January 2008 the BBC confirmed the return of the programme for a second series, which began airing on 10 September 2008. It is reported in The Aylesbury Commuter newspaper (8/5/08) that two local restaurants, The Green Dragon in Haddenham and Le Bistro in Wendover are to feature in the next series, which commenced filming 21 May 2008. The Ben Johnson at Weston On The Green, near Oxford, also features in the next series. The final episode of the second series was screened on 29 October 2008, in which finalists Michele and Russell competed against James Knight-Pacheco and Alasdair Hooper to provide a high class five-course meal to passengers on the Orient Express. The programme concluded as Raymond Blanc chose to start a new restaurant with winners Michele English and Russell Clement.

A third series of The Restaurant aired on BBC2 and BBC HD in 2009 and was won by JJ Goodman and James Hopkins. The victory was surprising to some as JJ had no kitchen experience, being instead a mixologist. The BBC defended the decision stating "the judges liked their ability to think on their feet, their work ethic and their concept." They beat runners up Christopher Hackett and Nathan Gooding in the final.
