= Belmond Le Manoir aux Quat'Saisons =

Le Manoir aux Quat' Saisons
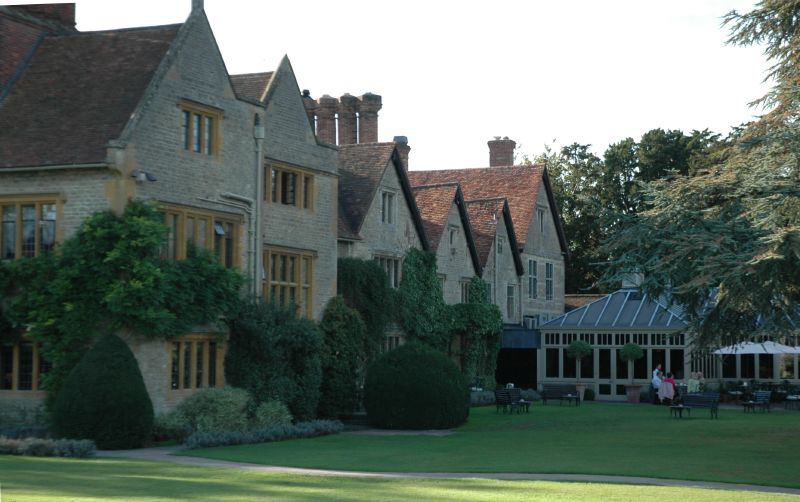
- Le Manoir in September 2006
- Interactive map of Le Manoir aux Quat' Saisons

Restaurant information
- Established: 1984; 42 years ago
- Owner: Belmond
- Head chef: Raymond Blanc and Luke Selby
- Food type: French; haute cuisine
- Dress code: Smart casual
- Rating: (Michelin Guide); AA Rosettes; Good Food Guide
- Location: Great Milton, Oxford, Oxfordshire, OX44 7PD, United Kingdom
- Coordinates: 51.7163°N 1.0919°W
- Reservations: Yes
- Other information: Nearest train station: Haddenham & Thame Parkway
- Website: www.belmond.com/

Belmond Le Manoir aux Quat' Saisons ("Four Seasons Manor") is a luxury hotel-restaurant in the village of Great Milton near Oxford, in Oxfordshire, England. It is situated in a 15th-century manor house. In March 2014 the company owning the restaurant introduced a new brand name, Belmond and the hotel changed its name to "Belmond Le Manoir aux Quat'Saisons". In December 2018 Belmond was acquired by LVMH.

The venue is currently closed for renovations until 2027.

== Description ==
The restaurant has two Michelin stars, as well as scoring 9/10 in the Good Food Guide. It is capable of serving 260 guests per day. It is owned by LVMH (since acquiring Belmond Ltd in December 2018) and run by the leading French chef Raymond Blanc. The executive chef is Luke Selby, having replaced Gary Jones who left the role in November 2022, after over 20 years. The head pastry chef is Benoit Blin. The gardens are used to grow fresh food for the restaurant. A helipad is available for clients.

The restaurant was used as a filming location in the BBC 2 television programme The Restaurant, where it has been used for challenges as well as Raymond Blanc's "room of truth".

The restaurant kitchen has trained 34 Michelin starred chefs. Its basic training programs for its chefs lasts approximately 2.5 years, with each chef spending 6 months on each "section" in the kitchen. Chefs who stay longer than the initial 2.5 years of training go on to learn the management side of the business.

=== Chefs trained at Le Manoir ===
Many notable chefs and restaurateurs were mentored by or worked for Raymond Blanc at Le Manoir, including:

- John Burton-Race
- Heston Blumenthal
- Michael Caines
- Elisha Carter
- Éric Chavot
- William Curley
- David Goodridge
- Paul Heathcote
- Paul Liebrandt
- David Moore
- Marco Pierre White
- James Knight-Pacheco

== Reception ==
Restaurant critic Jay Rayner visited Le Manoir for the first time in 2013. Whilst he described it as possibly the most expensive restaurant in Britain, he praised the set up including the kitchen garden. Regarding the food, he praised a "pitch-perfect" beetroot terrine, which was served with a horseradish sorbet quenelle. He wondered at the skill involved in creating a dessert of poached meringue and fried apricots inside a globe of nougatine. He said that while he could not justify or excuse the expense, the meal was fabulous.

== Public transport ==
Since June 2022, Le Manoir has subsidised a bus service between Great Milton and central Oxford. Oxford Bus Company route 46 links the village with central Oxford via Wheatley, Horspath and Cowley. Buses run hourly, seven days a week, from early morning until after midnight.
