= Raymond Blanc =

French chef (born 1949)

- Blanc at the 2019 Chelsea Flower Show
- Born: 19 November 1949 (age 76); Near Besançon
- Children: 2
- Culinary career
- Cooking style: French; haute cuisine
- Ratings
- Michelin stars AA Rosettes; Good Food Guide
- Current restaurant
- Le Manoir aux Quat' Saisons Brasserie Blanc
- Awards
- OBE
- Website: raymondblanc.com

Raymond Blanc OBE (born 19 November 1949) is a French chef. Blanc is the chef at Le Manoir aux Quat' Saisons, a hotel-restaurant in Great Milton, Oxfordshire, England. The restaurant has two Michelin stars and scored 9/10 in the Good Food Guide. He has said that he is self-taught, and has taught or employed chefs including Heston Blumenthal, John Burton-Race, Michael Caines, Paul Liebrandt, and Marco Pierre White.

== Early life ==
Blanc was born near Besançon, the capital of the Franche-Comté region in eastern France, between Burgundy and the Jura Mountains. He grew up in Saône, a village just east of there.

While his two sisters were taught to cook by the influential Maman Blanc, his father taught Blanc and his two brothers to work in the kitchen garden. His father gave him a colander and foraging map for his 10th birthday, and what he collected his mother taught him to cook.

== Early career ==
Training as a waiter, Blanc worked at the Michelin-starred Le Palais de la Bière in Besançon. In 1972 he was fired for upsetting the head chef when Blanc offered him advice on how to cook; however, the manager knew of a job at The Rose Revived in Newbridge, England. Not speaking English well enough to communicate without writing out what he wanted to say, it took Blanc three days to drive from Dover to Newbridge in his Renault 5 Gordini.

Blanc worked as a waiter at André Chavagnon's French restaurant, La Sorbonne, in Oxford High Street, where he learned how to cook. In 1976, Blanc married Jenny, the daughter of the owner of the Rose Revived, and they had two sons.

== Les Quat' Saisons and Le Manoir aux Quat' Saisons ==
In 1977, Blanc and his wife opened Les Quat' Saisons in a row of modern shops in Summertown, Oxford: "We mortgaged the house, owed 18 further people, and opened in a corridor between a lingerie shop and Oxfam". The restaurant was awarded one Michelin star in 1979, followed by two in 1982, before Blanc moved the restaurant to Great Milton in 1984 where it has continuously won 2 stars since. In 1983, Blanc purchased a manor-house in the Oxfordshire village of Great Milton, where he opened Le Manoir aux Quat' Saisons, a country house hotel and double Michelin starred restaurant. Awarded five AA stars and with a score of 19/20 from the French guide Gault Millau, Le Manoir describes itself as "one of the ultimate gastronomic destinations in the country".

== La Maison Blanc ==
In 1981, Blanc opened La Maison Blanc, a chain of boulangeries and pâtisseries that also contained cafès. There were 14 branches of Maison Blanc across the country, including several in London and one in Oxford. Maison Blanc cakes were also available nationwide in Waitrose supermarkets. The chain was closed in 2017 by its owners, Kout Food Group.

== Petit Blanc / Brasserie Blanc ==
Blanc opened Le Petit Blanc, the first of a chain of smaller restaurants, in Oxford in June 1996. Blanc's aim was to bring the French philosophy of "good food being central to good living" to the United Kingdom. His desire was to create and serve food that can be enjoyed by everyone – "from the time-conscious business person to those looking for a welcoming family restaurant". Blanc suffered two mini strokes when he was 42, believed to have been brought on by stress and overwork.

In June 2003, after nearly losing the chain to his ex-wife Jenny as part of his divorce settlement, the four Le Petit Blanc Brasseries (now known as Brasserie Blanc) in Birmingham (which closed in 2008), Cheltenham, Manchester and Oxford became part of the Loch Fyne Restaurant Group portfolio. Blanc maintains a share in the business, and continues to be involved creating new menus, developing the chef and kitchen teams and participating in the promotion of the restaurants. Since 1996, Raymond has opened the following branches of Brasserie Blanc:

- 1996 - Le Petit Blanc brasserie, Oxford. Awarded one Michelin Star in its first year and classed amongst the ten best restaurants in the country, in 2006 it was re-launched as Brasserie Blanc
- 1998 - Cheltenham
- 1999 - Birmingham (closed 2008)
- 2000 - Manchester
- 2004 - Tunbridge Wells (closed 2009)
- 2007 - Leeds and Milton Keynes
- 2008 - Bristol (closed 2019) and Winchester
- 2009 - Portsmouth
- 2010 - Chichester and Threadneedle Street, London
- 2012 - Bath, Berkhamsted, St Albans; and Chancery Lane, Charlotte Street, Covent Garden (closed 2016), St Paul's and Tower Hill in London

== Personal life ==
In 2012 Blanc became the president of the Sustainable Restaurant Association, and the Culinary Director for Eurostar. In March 2013, Raymond Blanc made the news with Mayor of London Boris Johnson, to publicise a scheme to get young people into the food and hospitality industry. Blanc took on twenty-one apprentices across the Brasserie Blanc Restaurants.

Blanc is one of the patrons of the Children's Food Festival, which was held on the Northmoor Trust Estate in south Oxfordshire in June 2009. In 2014 Blanc and Kate Humble presented Kew on a Plate, a 4-part television series demonstrating the garden growth and preparation of several vegetable dishes.

During the fourth series of The Great British Bake Off, Blanc made personal attacks against the contestant Ruby Tandoh in online comments. He derided her for being thin which he claimed indicated she must not truly love baking or cooking. He also criticised her for crying, which he called "female tears" and portrayed her crying as an attempt to manipulate the judges. Tandoh defended herself with an article in The Guardian and reflected on the anger and misogyny in online commentary about the show and responded to Blanc's comments directly. Blanc apologised for his comments, which became controversial. He described himself as a "grumpy Frenchman" to explain his behaviour.

== Notable chefs trained under Blanc ==
Blanc has taught or employed chefs and restaurateurs including:

- Sat Bains
- John Burton-Race
- Heston Blumenthal
- Michael Caines
- Elisha Carter
- Éric Chavot
- William Curley
- Shaun Dickens
- David Goodridge
- Paul Heathcote
- Marco Pierre White

== TV appearances ==
Blanc has made numerous appearances on many major television stations, during prime time viewing, in the UK. These include his own series Food & Drink in 1987, Take Six Cooks in 1986 and Masterchef in 1990, 1991, 1992, 1995 and 1998, as well as The Restaurant, a BBC 2 series hosted by Blanc where nine couples competed to win their own restaurant.

Blanc was a featured chef on Great Chefs television, appearing in Great Chefs of the World.

On 13 January 2007, he appeared on Saturday Kitchen. In the Omelette Challenge, he finished last because he took the longest to cook an omelette. However, he was nudged up a few places by James Martin, right above Ken Hom, as Blanc produced a black truffle out of his pocket and garnished the finished omelette with truffle shavings.

In summer 2007, a BBC promotion for his new reality TV programme The Restaurant was shown on UK television. (The show is known to BBC America viewers in the US as Last Restaurant Standing). The promo showed a group of well-dressed diners in a slow-motion food fight, to a Gonzales backing track. The show was part of BBC Two's autumn season in 2007 and returned, with minor changes to the format, in 2008. In 2009, The Restaurant returned to BBC Two in a low-budget format. This season was much criticised for the poor standard of contestants, for neglecting the successful elements of previous series, and for Blanc choosing as the winner a team without any discernible culinary ability outside of making cocktails.

- 1985 - Take Six Cooks
- 1987 - Food and Drink - Six-part series on BBC2
- 1994 - Blanc Mange - Six-part BBC2 series on food and chemistry
- 2000 - Friends for Dinner - Six-part BBC2 series with high-profile chefs participating in individual episodes
- 2001 to 2007 - BBC Radio 4 - Discussing topical industry issues, including organic produce
- 2001 - Newsnight - Foot and mouth issues - appeared with representatives from the Soil Association and the National Farmers Union
- 2001 - SKY News - Relevant and topical industry issues
- 2001 - Housecall - BBC1 daytime programme, hosted by Lowri Turner. Blanc appeared on a few of the shows cooking slots.
- 2002 - Passion for Perfection - Twelve-part Carlton Television series
- 2004 - So What Do You Do All Day - Dedicated episode of BBC Two series, which follows a high-profile professional through a typical working day.
- 2007 - The Restaurant series 1 - Eight-part BBC Two series. Nine couples are put through their paces to see if they have what it takes to run their own restaurant.
- 2008 - The Restaurant series 2 - Over eight weeks, nine couples compete to win a restaurant personally supported by Blanc.
- 2009 - The Restaurant series 3
- 2010 - Kitchen Secrets - BBC cookery show with a range of achievable and inspirational recipes for cooks of all abilities.
- 2011 - Kitchen Secrets 2 - Second series of cookery show with a range of achievable and inspirational recipes for cooks of all abilities
- 2011 - Raymond Blanc's Christmas Feast - BBC
- 2012 - The Very Hungry Frenchman - BBC 2
- 2013 - Raymond Blanc: How to Cook Well - Series of six half-hour programmes on BBC 2.
- 2015 - Kew on a Plate
- 2015 - Food and Drink - Appeared on 6 April 2015.
- 2021 - Simply Raymond - Series 1; April 2021
- 2022 - Simply Raymond - Series 2; January - February 2022
- 2024 - Raymond Blanc's Royal Kitchen Gardens - February - May 2024

Blanc also made a guest appearance on the BBC sitcom Miranda in episode 5 of the third series.

== Personal life ==
Blanc has two sons. Blanc lives in Oxford with long-term partner Natalia Traxel. In 2008 he received an honorary OBE.

== Bibliography ==
- 1988 - Recipes from Le Manoir aux Quat' Saisons (MacDonald Orbis) ISBN 978-0356120775
- 1991 - Cooking for Friends (Headline) ISBN 0-7472-7892-X
- 1994 - Mange: The Mysteries of the Kitchen Revealed ISBN 978-0563370161
- 1998 - Blanc Vite: Fast Fresh Food from Raymond Blanc (Murdoch Books) ISBN 978-0747217084
- 1999 - A Blanc Christmas (Headline) ISBN 978-0747275183
- 2002 - Foolproof French Cookery (BBC Worldwide) ISBN 978-0563534648
- 2005 - Simple French Cookery (BBC Books) ISBN 978-0563522850
- 2008 - A Taste of My Life (Bantam Press) ISBN 978-0593060360 (autobiography)
- 2011 - Kitchen Secrets (Bloomsbury Publishing) ISBN 978-1408816875
- 2012 - My Kitchen Table: 100 Recipes for Entertaining (BBC Books) ISBN 978-1849904353
- 2014 - Kitchen Garden Experts (Frances Lincoln) ISBN 978-0711234963
- 2015 - Kew on a Plate with Raymond Blanc (Headline) ISBN 978-1472224378
- 2019 - The Lost Orchard (Headline) ISBN 9781472267580
- 2021 - Simply Raymond (Headline) ISBN 978-1472267603
