= The Gambia–Iran relations =

- Gambia: Iran

Gambia–Iran relations are the bilateral relations between The Gambia and Iran. Neither country has a resident ambassador.

== History ==
Relations between The Gambia and Iran begun in the 1970s. The government of Dawda Jawara followed a policy of neutrality during the Iran-Iraq War. Relations progressed following Yahya Jammeh's ascension to the Gambian presidency in a coup d'état in 1994, with Iran offering economic assistance to The Gambia regarding agriculture and fisheries in 1996.

Mahmoud Ahmadinejad, the President of Iran, was a guest of honor at the 2006 African Union summit in The Gambia's capital city, Banjul, and he and Jammeh maintained "close ties". The Gambia has supported Iran's right to develop its nuclear program (see Nuclear program of Iran).

=== Severing of official ties (2010-2024) ===
"All government of The Gambia projects and programmes, which were [being] implemented in co-operation with the government of the Islamic Republic of Iran, have been cancelled."

— Ministry of Foreign Affairs of The Gambia

On 23 November 2010, The Gambia severed diplomatic and economic relations with Iran and ordered the expulsion from the country within 48 hours of all Iranian officials. The announcement of the Ministry of Foreign Affairs of the Gambia included no reason for the decision, but "sources close to the ministry" pointed to the seizure, in October, by Nigerian security forces of an Iranian weapons shipment headed to The Gambia.

Alaeddin Boroujerdi, Chairman of the National Security and Foreign Policy Committee of the Iranian parliament, the Islamic Consultative Assembly, attributed the action to pressure from the United States.

Among the projects which will be ended by the termination of relations will be an agreement, worth US$2 billion (£1.2 billion), whereby Iran would have supplied lorries and commercial vehicles to the Gambia.

Diplomatic relations were renewed on 29 July 2024.

== See also ==
- Foreign relations of The Gambia
- Foreign relations of Iran
