= The Gambia–United Kingdom relations =

- Gambia: United Kingdom

Diplomatic mission
- High Commission of The Gambia, London: High Commission of the United Kingdom, Banjul

The Gambia–United Kingdom relations are the bilateral relations between The Gambia and the United Kingdom (UK).

Both countries share common membership of the Atlantic Co-operation Pact, the Commonwealth, the International Criminal Court, the United Nations, and the World Trade Organization. Bilaterally the two countries have a Double Taxation Convention, and an Investment Agreement.

== History ==
The UK governed the Gambia from 1816 until 1965, when the Gambia achieved full independence.

== Diplomatic missions ==
As Commonwealth nations, The Gambia and the United Kingdom are accredited to each other through high commissions.

- The Gambia maintains a high commission in London.
- The United Kingdom is accredited to the Gambia through its high commission in Banjul.

== See also ==
- Foreign relations of the Gambia
- Foreign relations of the United Kingdom
