= List of diplomatic missions of the Gambia =

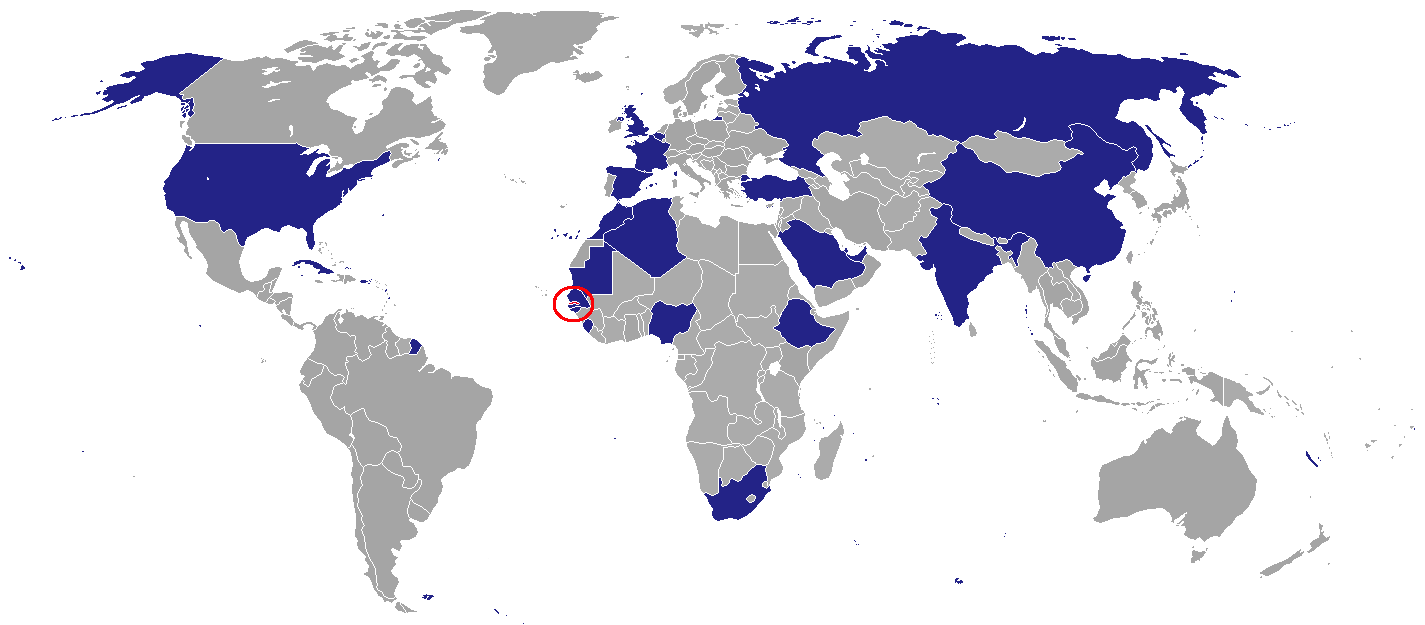
Diplomatic missions of the Gambia

This is a list of diplomatic missions of the Gambia. The Republic of the Gambia became independent from Britain in 1965. As a relatively small country in West Africa, the Gambia has only a limited number of foreign missions abroad.

== Current missions ==
=== Africa ===
Host country	Host city	Mission	Concurrent accreditation	Ref.
Ethiopia	Addis Ababa	Embassy	Countries: Kenya; International Organizations: African Union; United Nations Economic Commission for Africa	
Guinea-Bissau	Bissau	Embassy	Countries: Guinea	
Mauritania	Nouakchott	Embassy		
Morocco	Rabat	Embassy	Countries: Cyprus; Libya; Tunisia	
Morocco	Dakhla	Consulate-General	Countries: Cyprus; Libya; Tunisia	
Nigeria	Abuja	High Commission	Countries: Angola; Benin; Cameroon; Central African Republic; Chad; Congo-Brazzaville; Gabon; Ghana; Niger; Rwanda; Togo; International Organizations: Economic Community of West African States	
Senegal	Dakar	High Commission	Countries: Burkina Faso; Mali	
Sierra Leone	Freetown	High Commission		
South Africa	Pretoria	High Commission	Countries: Botswana; Eswatini; Lesotho; Malawi; Mozambique; Namibia; Zambia; Zimbabwe	

=== Americas ===
Host country	Host city	Mission	Concurrent accreditation	Ref.
Cuba	Havana	Embassy		
United States	Washington, D.C.	Embassy	Countries: Brazil; Canada; Mexico	

=== Asia ===
Host country	Host city	Mission	Concurrent accreditation	Ref.
China	Beijing	Embassy	Countries: Japan; Mongolia; North Korea; Philippines; South Korea	
India	New Delhi	High Commission	Countries: Bangladesh; Indonesia; Maldives; Myanmar; Nepal; Sri Lanka	
Qatar	Doha	Embassy		
Saudi Arabia	Riyadh	Embassy	Countries: Bahrain; Oman	
Saudi Arabia	Jeddah	Consulate-General	Countries: Bahrain; Oman	
Turkey	Ankara	Embassy	Countries: Azerbaijan; Uzbekistan	
United Arab Emirates	Abu Dhabi	Embassy		

=== Europe ===
Host country	Host city	Mission	Concurrent accreditation	Ref.
Belgium	Brussels	Embassy	Countries: Czechia; Germany; Luxembourg; Netherlands; Poland; Serbia; Slovenia; Multilateral Organizations: European Union; Organisation for the Prohibition of Chemical Weapons	
France	Paris	Embassy	Countries: Hungary; Portugal; Romania; Multilateral Organizations: UNESCO	
Spain	Madrid	Embassy	Countries: Italy; Greece; Malta; International Organizations: Food and Agriculture Organization; International Fund for Agricultural Development; World Food Programme	
Russia	Moscow	Embassy		
United Kingdom	London	High Commission	Countries: Austria; Denmark; Finland; Holy See; Iceland; Ireland; Israel; Norway; Sweden; Sovereign Entity: Sovereign Military Order of Malta	

=== Multilateral organisations ===
Organization	Host city	Host country	Mission	Concurrent accreditation	Ref.
United Nations	New York City	United States	Permanent Mission	Countries: Guatemala	
United Nations	Geneva	Switzerland	Permanent Mission	Countries: Switzerland	

== Gallery ==
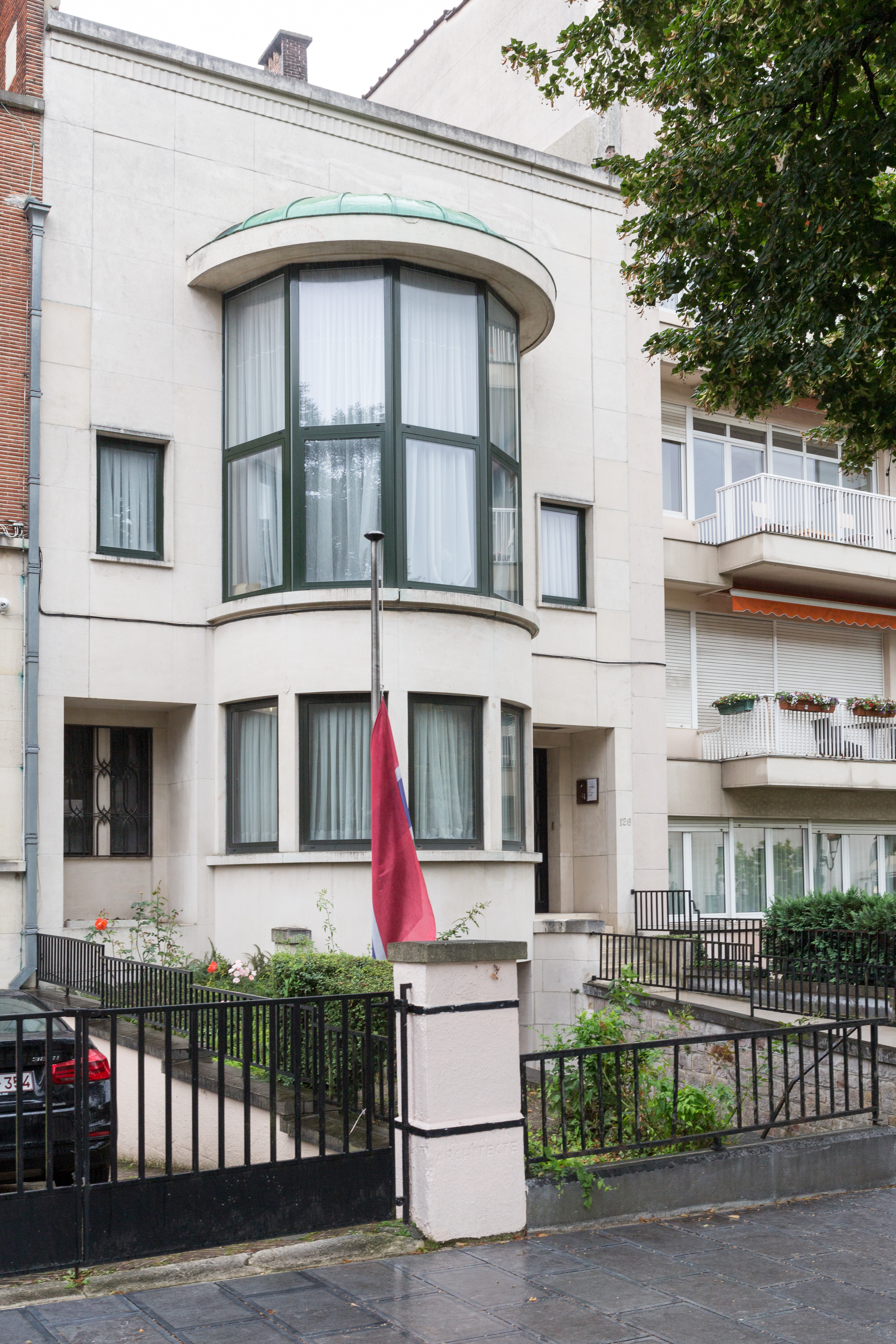
Embassy in Brussels

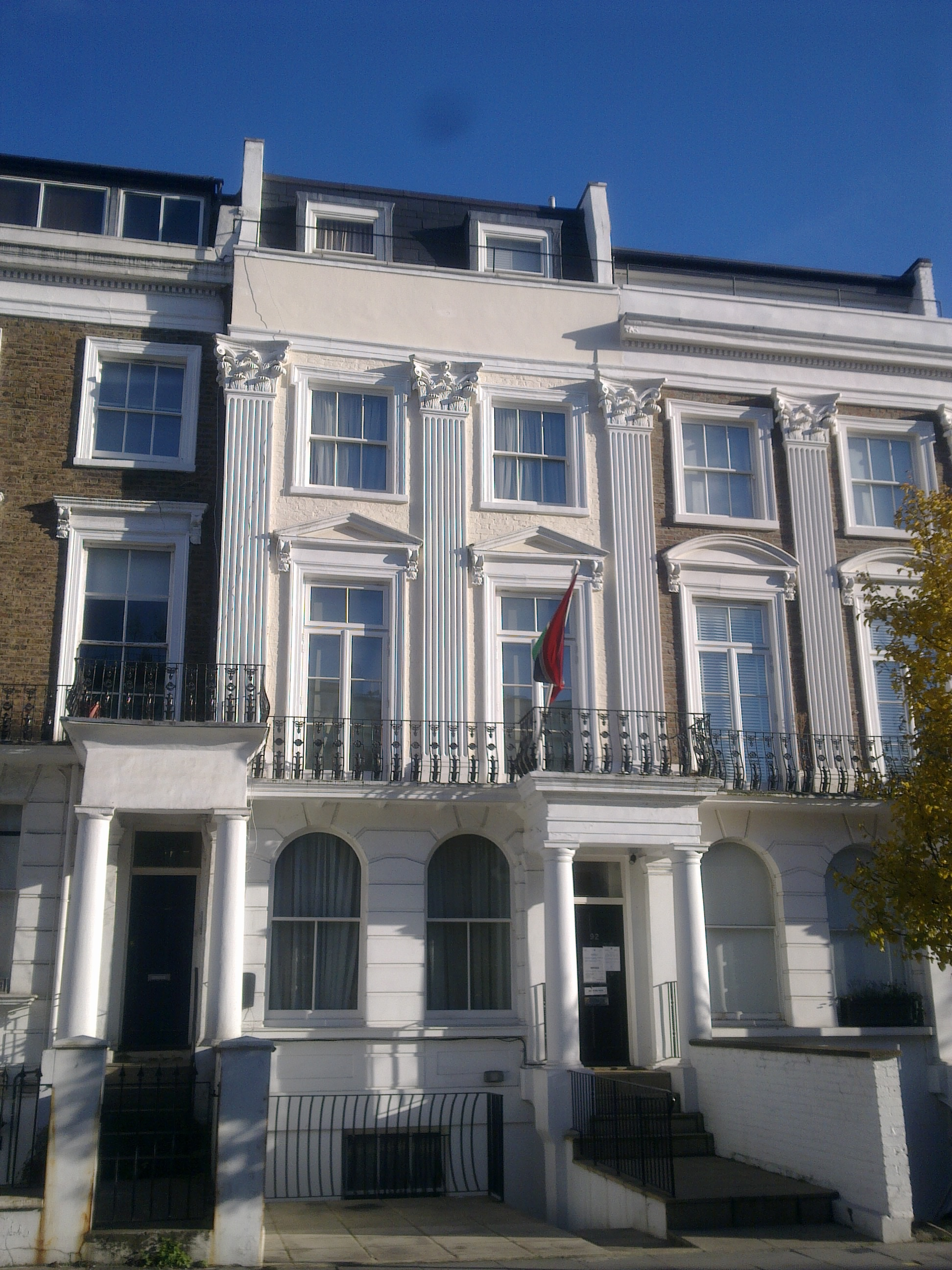
High Commission in London

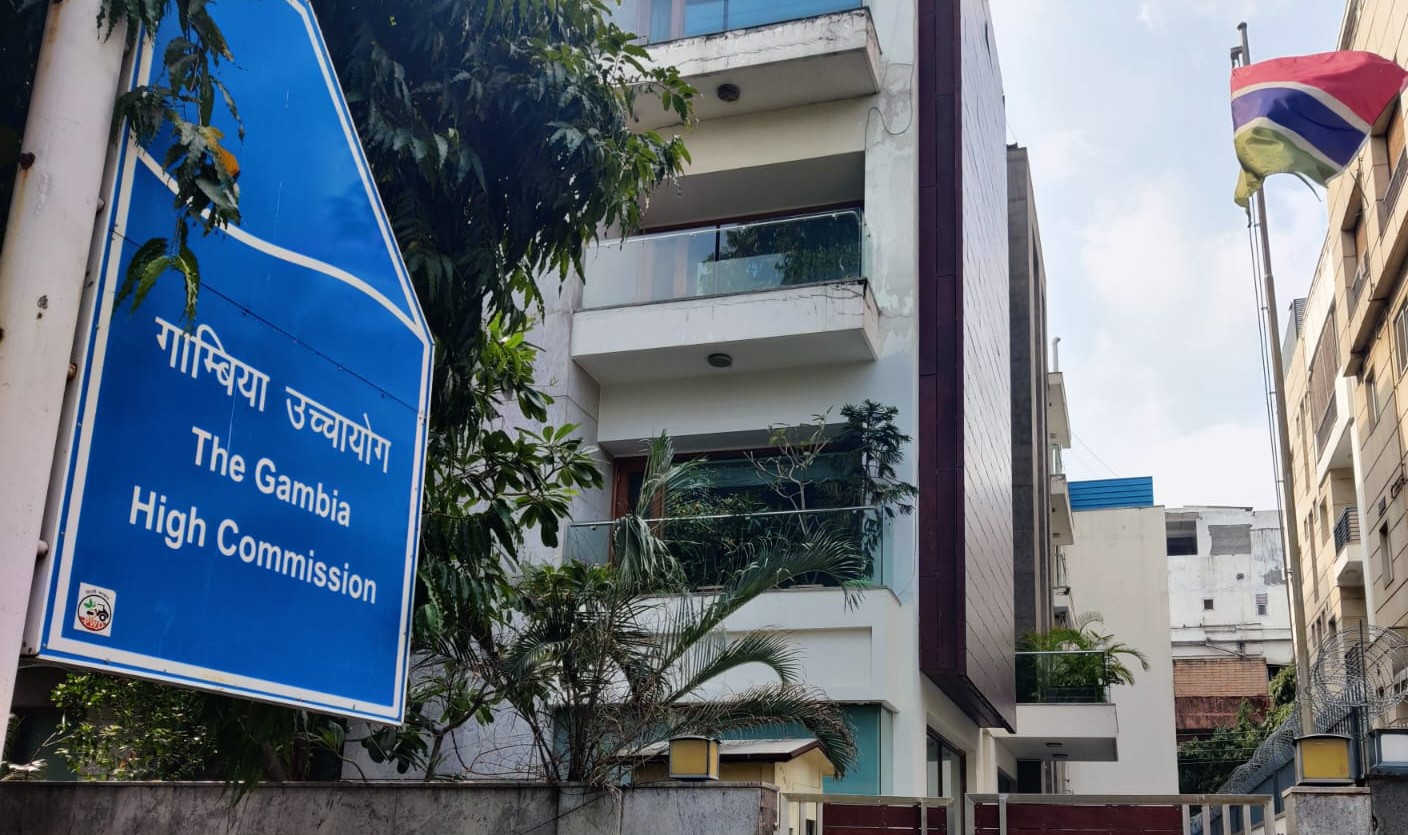
High Commission in New Delhi

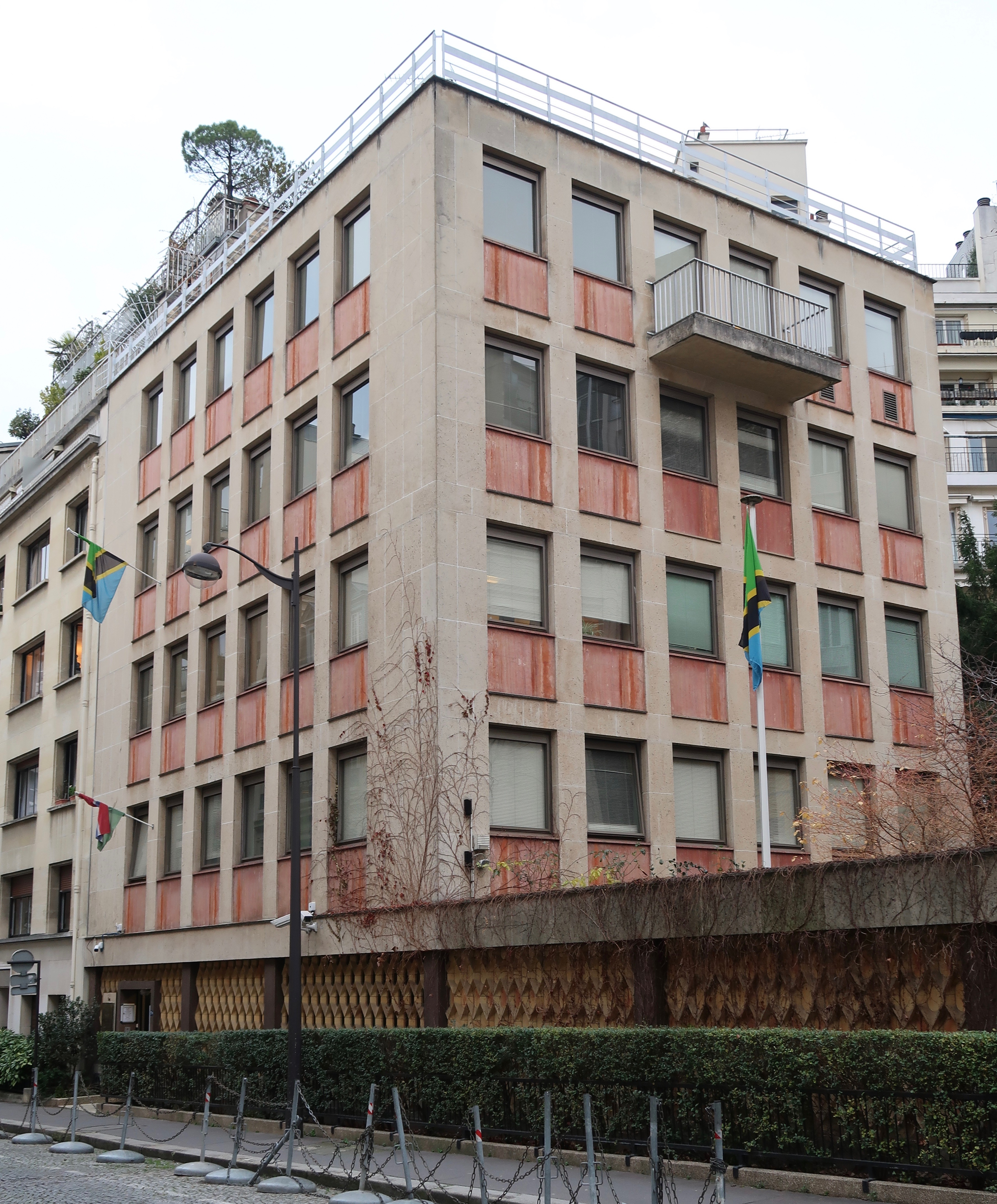
Embassy in Paris

== Closed missions ==
=== Asia ===
Host country	Host city	Mission	Year closed	Ref.
Iran	Tehran	Embassy	2010	
Malaysia	Kuala Lumpur	High Commission	2020	
Republic of China (Taiwan)	Taipei	Embassy	2013	

== Missions to open ==
Host country	Host city	Mission	Ref.
Germany	Berlin	Embassy	
Japan	Tokyo	Embassy	
Sweden	Stockholm	Embassy	

== See also ==
- Foreign relations of the Gambia
- List of diplomatic missions in the Gambia
- Visa policy of the Gambia
