= List of diplomatic missions in the Gambia =

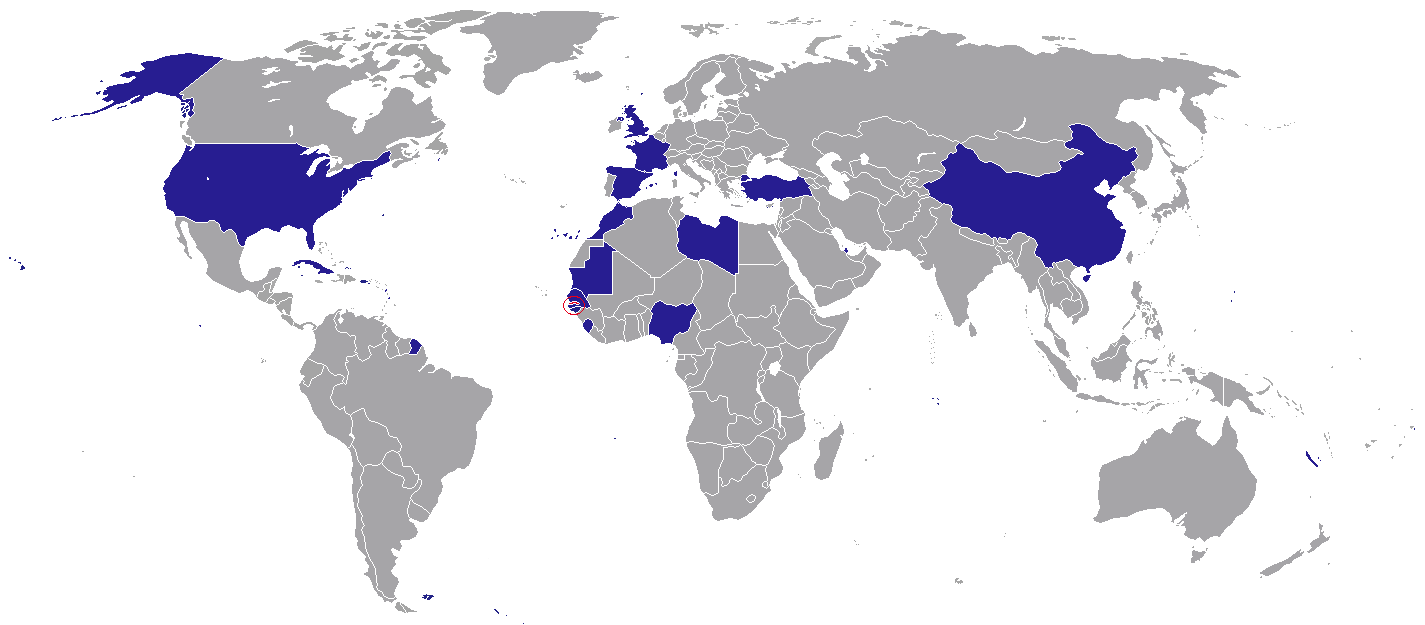
Map of diplomatic missions in the Gambia

At present, the Gambia's capital city of Banjul hosts 16 embassies and 2 embassy extension offices. Several other countries have honorary consuls to provide emergency services to their citizens, while others accredit ambassadors from neighbouring countries.

== Embassies and High Commissions in Banjul ==
1. China
2. Cuba
3. Germany
4. Guinea-Bissau
5. Libya
6. Mauritania
7. Morocco
8. Nigeria
9. Qatar
10. Russia
11. Senegal
12. Sierra Leone
13. Sovereign Military Order of Malta
14. Turkey
15. United Kingdom
16. United States

== Other missions in Banjul ==
- France (Embassy office)
- Spain (Embassy office)

== Non-resident embassies ==
Most of the embassies accredited to the Gambia are located in Dakar, Senegal unless indicated otherwise.

- Algeria
- Angola
- Argentina (Abuja)
- Australia (Accra)
- Austria
- Azerbaijan (Rabat)
- Belgium
- Brazil
- Cameroon
- Canada
- Colombia
- Croatia (London)
- Cyprus (Brussels)
- Denmark (Bamako)
- Dominican Republic (Rabat)
- Finland
- France
- Greece
- India
- Indonesia
- Iran
- Ireland
- Israel
- Italy
- Japan
- Kenya
- Malaysia
- Mali
- Mexico (Accra)
- Netherlands
- New Zealand (Cairo)
- Norway (Accra)
- Philippines (Abuja)
- Poland (Rabat)
- Portugal
- Romania
- Serbia (New York City)
- Seychelles (Addis Ababa)
- Slovakia (Abuja)
- Somalia
- Spain
- South Africa
- South Korea
- Sweden (Abuja)
- Switzerland
- Tanzania (Abuja)
- Venezuela
- Vietnam (Algiers)
- Zimbabwe

== Former embassies ==
- Iran (Note: Resident in Dakar, Senegal)
- Palestine
- Republic of China (Taiwan)
- Togo
- Venezuela

== See also ==
- Foreign relations of the Gambia
- List of diplomatic missions of the Gambia
