= Visa policy of the Gambia =

Policy on permits required to enter the Gambia

Visitors to the Gambia must obtain a visa from one of the Gambian diplomatic missions, unless they come from one of the visa exempt countries or they do not have a Gambian diplomatic representative/embassy in their country, in this case they can obtain one at the Banjul International Airport.

In October 2019, the Government of the Gambia announced plans for a new visa policy.

== Visa policy map ==
The Gambia Visa not required Visa on arrival Visa required

== Visa exemption ==
=== Ordinary Passports ===
Citizens of the following countries may enter Gambia without a visa for stays up to the duration below:

90 Days

- All African Union member states
- All Commonwealth of Nations member states
- All European Union member states
- All European Free Trade Association member states

- Albania
- Andorra
- Bosnia and Herzegovina
- Indonesia
- Monaco
- Montenegro
- North Macedonia
- San Marino
- Serbia
- Turkey
- United Arab Emirates
- United Kingdom
- Vatican City

Andorra, Indonesia, Liechtenstein, San Marino, Monaco, and Vatican City are listed as visa-free on Timatic, despite not appearing on the Gambian Tourism Board list.

Citizens of United States can enter the country with a visa on arrival for maximum of 30 days. (Travelers entering and exiting The Gambia are required to pay 20 USD (or 20 EURO / 10000 DALASI) security fee upon arrival and departure at the airport, payable in cash (USD or DALASI) only at kiosks.)

Date of visa changes
- 30 April 1980: ECOWAS (Economic Community of West African States): Benin, Burkina Faso, Cape Verde, Ghana, Guinea, Guinea-Bissau, Ivory Coast, Liberia, Mali, Niger, Nigeria, Senegal, Sierra Leone, Togo

Citizens of all countries who travel on a tourist charter flight do not need a visa to enter The Gambia.

=== Non-ordinary passports ===
Holders of diplomatic, official or service passports of the following countries may enter The Gambia without a visa for a maximum period of 90 days each visit (unless otherwise stated):

- Azerbaijan^{D}
- Indonesia^{D} ^{O} ^{1}

_{D - Diplomatic passports}
_{O - Official passports}
_{1 – 30 days}

== History ==
In the past, The Gambia required citizens of some countries to obtain clearance in addition to a traditional visa, while others needed either a visa or only clearance. In recent years, this policy has been abandoned, but some government websites have not been properly updated, which has created a lot of confusion.

== Visitor statistics ==
Most visitors arriving to the Gambia for tourism purposes were from the following countries of nationality:

Country	2023	2012
United Kingdom	32,957	60,424
Netherlands	20,861	19,817
United States	11,266	4,058
Spain	10,087	4,280
Senegal	7,847	
Germany	6,995	7,076
Belgium	6,337	5,802
Nigeria	5,638	8,657
Sweden	4,517	8,107
France	4,312	2,073

== See also ==
- Visa requirements for Gambian citizens
- Gambian passport
