= Gambian passport =

Travel document

- The front cover of a contemporary Gambian passport.
- Type: Passport
- First issued: 2022 (current biometric version)
- Purpose: Identification
- Eligibility: Gambian citizenship
- Expiration: 5 years

Gambian passports are issued to Gambian citizens to travel outside the Gambia.

== Physical properties ==
- Surname
- Given names
- Nationality Gambian
- Date of birth
- Sex
- Place of birth
- Date of Expiry
- Passport number

== Languages ==
The data page/information page is printed in English and French.

== See also ==
- ECOWAS passports
- List of passports
- Visa policy of Gambia
- Visa requirements for Gambian citizens
