= Azerbaijan–the Gambia relations =

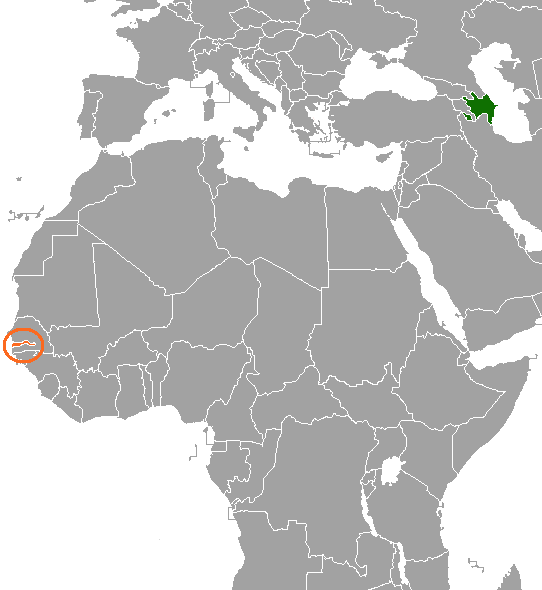

- Azerbaijan: Gambia

Azerbaijan–the Gambia relations are the bilateral relations between Azerbaijan and The Gambia. Neither country has a resident ambassador.

== Diplomatic relations ==
On November 11, 1994, the Protocol on the establishment of diplomatic relations between the two states was signed.

According to the Order of President of Azerbaijan Ilham Aliyev dated December 11, 2012 No. 2587, Tariq Ismail oglu Aliyev was appointed as the Extraordinary Ambassador of Azerbaijan to The Gambia.

== High-level visits ==
In order to participate in the second meeting of the Ministers of Labor of the Organization of Islamic Cooperation member states, held on April 23–26, 2013 in Baku, a delegation headed by the Minister of Labor of The Gambia Kebba S. Turay visited Azerbaijan.

In June 2018, a meeting took place between Minister of Foreign Affairs of Azerbaijan Elmar Mammadyarov and Gambian MFA, Ousainou Darboe.

== Economic cooperation ==
According to statistics from the United Nations Trade Office (COMTRADE), in 2015, the volume of exports from Azerbaijan amounted to 11.03 thousand US dollars.

== International cooperation ==
In the international arena, cooperation is carried out within the framework of various international organizations, including the Organization of Islamic Cooperation and the UN.

At the vote held on March 14, 2008 within the framework of the 62nd session of the UN General Assembly in connection with the draft resolution submitted by Azerbaijan "On the situation in the occupied territories of Azerbaijan", the government of The Gambia supported the position of Azerbaijan.

== See also ==
- Foreign relations of Azerbaijan
- Foreign relations of The Gambia
