= Visa requirements for Gambian citizens =

Administrative entry restrictions

Visa requirements for Gambian citizens are administrative entry restrictions imposed on citizens of Gambia by the authorities of other states. As of 2026, Gambian citizens had visa-free or visa on arrival access to 68 countries and territories, ranking the Gambian passport 65th in terms of travel freedom according to the Henley Passport Index.

== Visa requirements map ==
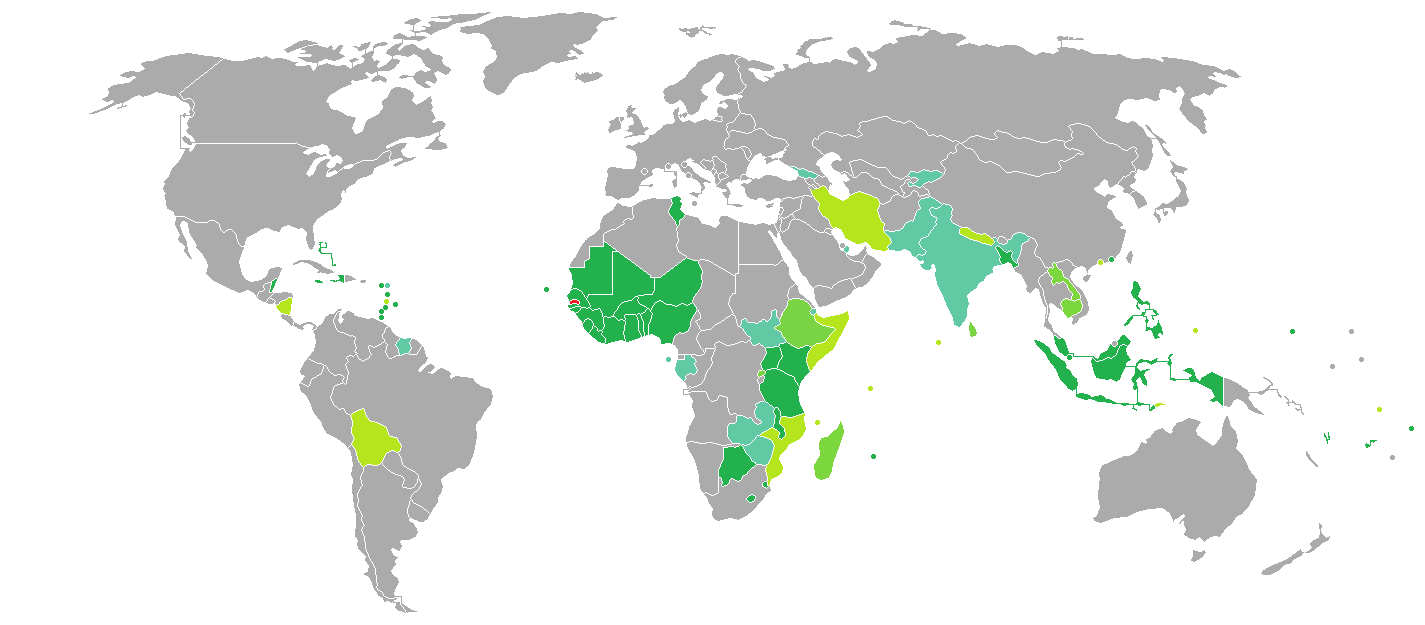
The Gambia Visa not required Visa obtainable on arrival eVisa Visa available both on arrival or online Pre-arrival visa required

== Visa requirements ==
Country	Visa requirement	Allowed stay	Notes (excluding departure fees)
Afghanistan	eVisa		Visa is not required in case born in Afghanistan or can proof that one of their parents is a national of Afghanistan or born in Afghanistan.; e-Visa : Visitors must arrive at Kabul International (KBL).
Albania	eVisa		Visa free if hold a valid, multiple-entry and previously used visa or a residence permit issued by a Schengen area country, United States, Cyprus, Ireland or the United Kingdom
Algeria	Visa required		
Andorra	Visa required		
Angola	Visa required		
Antigua and Barbuda	Electronic Entry Visa		
Argentina	Visa required		The AVE (High Speed Travel) is open to Gambian citizens holding valid, current ordinary passports traveling to Argentina for tourism. To do so, they must hold a valid category B2/J/B1/O/P (P1-P2-P3)/E/H-1B visa issued by the United States of America.
Armenia	Visa required		
Australia and territories	Visa required		May apply online (Online Visitor e600 visa).
Austria	Visa required		
Azerbaijan	Visa required		
Bahamas	Visa not required	3 months	
Bahrain	eVisa	2 weeks	
Bangladesh	Visa not required	90 days	
Barbados	Visa not required	6 months	
Belarus	Visa required		Visa-free for 5 days for holders a Schengen visa or a national visa of country of EU, must arrive via Minsk International Airport.
Belgium	Visa required		
Belize	Visa not required		
Benin	Visa not required	90 days	
Bhutan	Visa required		
Bolivia	Visa on arrival	90 days	
Bosnia and Herzegovina	Visa required		30 days visa free if hold a valid multiple entry visa holders and residents of the European Union, Schengen Area member states, and United States of America
Botswana	Visa not required	90 days	
Brazil	Visa required		
Brunei	Visa required		
Bulgaria	Visa required		
Burkina Faso	Visa not required		
Burundi	Visa on arrival		
Cambodia	eVisa / Visa on arrival	30 days	
Cameroon	Visa required		
Canada	Visa required		
Cape Verde	Visa not required	90 days	
Central African Republic	Visa required		
Chad	Visa required		
Chile	Visa required		
China	Visa required		
Colombia	Visa required		
Comoros	Visa on arrival	45 days	
Republic of the Congo	Visa required		
Democratic Republic of the Congo	Visa required		
Costa Rica	Visa required		holding a valid, multiple-entry visa or residence permit issued by the Schengen Area, Canada, the United Kingdom or the United States
Côte d'Ivoire	Visa not required		
Croatia	Visa required		
Cuba	Tourist Card required	90 days	
Cyprus	Visa required		
Czech Republic	Visa required		
Denmark	Visa required		
Djibouti	eVisa	31 days	
Dominica	Visa not required	6 months	
Dominican Republic	Visa required		
Ecuador	Visa required		
Egypt	Visa required		
El Salvador	Visa required		180 days visa free if hold a valid visa issued by Canada, the United States or a Schengen member state
Equatorial Guinea	eVisa		e-Visa holders must arrive via Malabo International Airport. 75 USD for processing fee
Eritrea	Visa required		
Estonia	Visa required		
Eswatini	Visa on arrival	30 days	
Ethiopia	eVisa / Visa on arrival	up to 90 days	Visa on arrival is obtainable only at Addis Ababa Bole International Airport.; e-Visa holders must arrive via Addis Ababa Bole International Airport.; e-Visa is available for 30 or 90 days.
Fiji	Visa not required	4 months	
Finland	Visa required		
France	Visa required		
Gabon	eVisa		Electronic visa holders must arrive via Libreville International Airport.
Georgia	Visa required		180 days visa free if Hold a valid visa or residence permit of The European Union, European Free Trade Association or Gulf Cooperation Council member states
Germany	Visa required		
Ghana	Visa not required	90 days	
Greece	Visa required		
Grenada	Visa not required	3 months	
Guatemala	Visa required		90 days visa free if hold a valid visa issued by Canada, the United States or a Schengen member state
Guinea	Visa not required		
Guinea-Bissau	Visa not required		
Guyana	Visa required		
Haiti	Visa not required	3 months	
Honduras	Visa required		90 days visa free if hold a valid visa issued by Canada, the United States or a Schengen member state
Hungary	Visa required		
Iceland	Visa required		
India	e-Visa	60 days	e-Visa holders must arrive via 32 designated airports (Note: Ahmedabad; Amritsar; Bagdogra; Bengaluru; Bhubaneswar; Chandigarh; Chennai; Coimbatore; Delhi; Gaya; Goa-Dabolim; Goa-Manohar; Guwahati; Hyderabad; Indore; Jaipur; Kannur; Kochi; Kolkata; Kozhikode; Lucknow; Madurai; Mangaluru; Mumbai; Nagpur; Port Blair; Pune; Surat; Thiruvananthapuram; Tiruchirappalli; Varanasi; Visakhapatnam) or 5 designated seaports. (Note: Chennai; Cochin; Mormugao (Goa); Mumbai; Mangalore); An Indian e-Tourist Visa may only be obtained twice within 1 calendar year.; Foreigners of Pakistani origin or who hold a Pakistani Passport are not eligible for an e-Visa. Foreigners who are not Pakistani nationals, but whose parents or grandparents (either paternal or maternal) were born in, or were permanent residents in Pakistan, are also not eligible for an e-Visa.
Indonesia	Visa required		
Iran	Visa on arrival	30 days	
Iraq	Visa required		
Ireland	Visa required		
Israel	Visa required		
Italy	Visa required		
Jamaica	Visa not required		
Japan	Visa required		
Jordan	Visa required		
Kazakhstan	eVisa		must arrive via Nursultan Nazarbayev Airport or Almaty Airport
Kenya	Electronic Travel Authorisation	3 months	
Kiribati	Visa not required	90 days	90 days within calendar year
North Korea	Visa required		
South Korea	Visa required		
Kuwait	Visa required		
Kyrgyzstan	eVisa		
Laos	eVisa / Visa on arrival	30 days	18 (Note: Savannakhet Airport; Lanetoui - Mengkang (China); Meuangmom - Wan Pong (Myanmar); Banvang - Ban Khok Phai (Thailand); Namngeun - Huay Kon (Thailand); Paksan - Bueng Kan (Thailand); Paktaphan - Pak Saeng (Thailand); Pangmon - Ban Huak (Thailand); Phoudou (Thailand); Dak ta ock - Nam Giang (Vietnam); La Lai (Vietnam); Namkan (Vietnam); Namphao - Cau Treo (Vietnam); Namsoy - Na Meo (Vietnam); Naphao - Cha Lo (Vietnam); Pahang - Long Sap (Vietnam); Panghok - Tây Trang (Vietnam); Phoukeua - Bo Y (Vietnam)) of the 33 border crossings are only open to regular visa holders.; e-Visa may be used to enter Laos through the Luang Prabang, Pakse and Vientiane international airports, 3 Thai-Lao Friendship Bridges (Note: Vientiane (Friendship Bridge 1); Savannakhet (Friendship Bridge 2); Bokeo (Friendship Bridge 4)), in Boten (road and railroad), and in Vientiane (at Khamsavath railway station).; Visa on arrival is available at the Luang Prabang, Pakse and Vientiane international airports, 4 Thai-Lao Friendship Bridges (Note: Vientiane (Friendship Bridge 1); Savannakhet (Friendship Bridge 2); Khammouane (Friendship Bridge 3); Bokeo (Friendship Bridge 4)) and 7 border crossings. (Note: Nongnokkheane - Trapeang Kriel (Cambodia); Boten - Bo han (China); Golden Triangle/Samliemkham (Thailand); Khamsavath railway station (Thailand); Namheuang - Ban Na Kraseng (Thailand); Vang tao - Chongmek (Thailand); Dansavan - Lao Bảo (Vietnam))
Latvia	Visa required		
Lebanon	Visa required		In addition to a visa, an approval should be obtained from the Immigration department of the General Directorate of General Security (La Surete Generale).
Lesotho	Visa not required	90 days	
Liberia	Visa not required		
Libya	Visa required		mighe be accessed online here
Liechtenstein	Visa required		
Lithuania	Visa required		
Luxembourg	Visa required		
Madagascar	eVisa / Visa on arrival	90 days	
Malawi	Visa not required	90 days	
Malaysia	Visa not required	30 days	
Maldives	Free visa on arrival	30 days	
Mali	Visa not required		
Malta	Visa required		
Marshall Islands	Visa required		
Mauritania	Visa not required		
Mauritius	Visa not required	180 days	
Mexico	Visa required		90 days visa free if hold a valid visa or permanent residence of Canada, Schengen Area, Japan, the United Kingdom or the United States as well as permanent residence of Chile or Colombia
Micronesia	Visa not required	30 days	
Moldova	Visa required		
Monaco	Visa required		
Mongolia	eVisa		
Montenegro	Visa required		30 days if Hold a valid of the Schengen Member, Australia, Japan, Canada, New Zealand, Ireland, the United States or the United Kingdom
Morocco	Visa required		
Mozambique	Visa on arrival	30 days	
Myanmar	Visa required		
Namibia	Visa on arrival	90 days	
Nauru	Visa required		
Nepal	Visa on arrival	90 days	
Netherlands	Visa required		
New Zealand	Visa required		Holders of an Australian Permanent Resident Visa or Resident Return Visa may be granted a New Zealand Resident Visa on arrival permitting indefinite stay (pursuant to the Trans-Tasman Travel Arrangement), subject to meeting character requirements and obtaining an Electronic Travel Authority prior to departure.
Nicaragua	Visa on arrival	30 days	
Niger	Visa not required		
Nigeria	Visa not required		
North Macedonia	Visa required		15 days visa free if Hold a valid of Canada, the United States or the United Kingdom
Norway	Visa required		
Oman	Visa required		
Pakistan	Electronic Travel Authorization		
Palau	Free visa on arrival	30 days	
Panama	Visa required		
Papua New Guinea	Visa required		
Paraguay	Visa required		
Peru	Visa required		
Philippines	Visa not required	30 days	
Poland	Visa required		
Portugal	Visa required		
Qatar	eVisa		
Romania	Visa required		
Russia	Visa required		
Rwanda	eVisa / Visa on arrival	30 days	
Saint Kitts and Nevis	Visa not required	3 months	
Saint Lucia	Visa on arrival	6 weeks	
Saint Vincent and the Grenadines	Visa not required	3 months	
Samoa	Visa not required	60 days	
San Marino	Visa required		
São Tomé and Príncipe	eVisa		
Saudi Arabia	Visa required		
Senegal	Visa not required	90 days	
Serbia	Visa required		90 days within 180 days visa free if hold a valid visa or residents of the Cyprus, Ireland, Schengen Area member states, United Kingdom or the United States
Seychelles	Electronic Border System	3 months	
Sierra Leone	Visa not required		
Singapore	Visa not required	30 days	
Slovakia	Visa required		
Slovenia	Visa required		
Solomon Islands	Visa required		VoA if having Pre-arranged visa
Somalia	Visa on arrival	30 days	All visitors must have an approved Electronic Visa (eTAS) before the start of their journey.
South Africa	Visa required		
South Sudan	Electronic Visa		Obtainable online; Printed visa authorization must be presented at the time of travel
Spain	Visa required		
Sri Lanka	eVisa / visa on arrival	30 days or 60 days	
Sudan	Visa required		
Suriname	eVisa		
Sweden	Visa required		
Switzerland	Visa required		
Syria	Visa required		
Tajikistan	Visa required		
Tanzania	Visa not required	90 days	
Thailand	Visa required		
Timor-Leste	Visa on arrival	30 days	
Togo	Visa not required		
Tonga	Visa required		
Trinidad and Tobago	Visa not required		
Tunisia	Visa not required	3 months	
Turkey	Visa required		
Turkmenistan	Visa required		
Tuvalu	Free visa on arrival	1 month	
Uganda	Visa not required	3 months	
Ukraine	Visa required		
United Arab Emirates	Visa required		
United Kingdom and Crown dependencies	Visa required		
United States	Visa required		
Uruguay	Visa required		
Uzbekistan	Visa required		
Vanuatu	Visa not required	30 days	
Vatican City	Visa required		
Venezuela	Visa required		
Vietnam	eVisa	90 days	30 days visa free when visit Phu Quoc Island
Yemen	Visa required		
Zambia	eVisa	90 days	
Zimbabwe	eVisa	3 months	

== Dependent, Disputed, or Restricted territories ==
Unrecognized or partially recognized countries

Territory	Conditions of access	Notes
Abkhazia	Visa required	
Kosovo	Visa required	Do not need a visa a holder of a valid biometric residence permit issued by one of the Schengen member states or a valid multi-entry Schengen Visa, a holder of a valid Laissez-Passer issued by United Nations Organizations, NATO, OSCE, Council of Europe or European Union a holder of a valid travel documents issued by EU Member and Schengen States, United States of America, Canada, Australia and Japan based on the 1951 Convention on Refugee Status or the 1954 Convention on the Status of Stateless Persons, as well as holders of valid travel documents for foreigners (max. 15 days stay)
Northern Cyprus	Visa not required	
Palestine	Visa not required	Arrival by sea to Gaza Strip not allowed.
Sahrawi Arab Democratic Republic		Undefined visa regime in the Western Sahara controlled territory.
Somaliland	Visa on arrival	30 days for 30 US dollars, payable on arrival.
South Ossetia	Visa not required	Multiple entry visa to Russia and three day prior notification are required to enter South Ossetia.
Taiwan	Visa required	Gambian citizens are subject to special visa requirements and may only visit Taiwan under specific conditions, including official invitations, business activities, medical treatment, family visits, or participation in approved events.; Those visiting Taiwan on business must be interviewed by a Taiwanese consular officer, and their sponsors must submit a letter of guarantee to the Bureau of Consular Affairs in Taiwan.
Transnistria	Visa not required	Registration required after 24h.

Dependent and autonomous territories

Territory	Conditions of access	Notes
China
Hong Kong	Visa required	
Macau	Visa on arrival	30 days
Denmark
Faroe Islands	Visa required	
Greenland	Visa required	
France
French Guiana	Visa required	
French Polynesia	Visa required	
(France) French West Indies	Visa required	Includes overseas departments of Guadeloupe and Martinique and overseas collectivities of Saint Barthélemy and Saint Martin.
Mayotte	Visa required	
New Caledonia	Visa required	
Réunion	Visa required	
Saint Pierre and Miquelon	Visa required	
Wallis and Futuna	Visa required	
Netherlands
Aruba	Visa required	
Caribbean Netherlands	Visa required	Includes Bonaire, Sint Eustatius and Saba.
Curaçao	Visa required	
Sint Maarten	Visa required	
New Zealand
Cook Islands	Visa not required	31 days
Niue	Visa not required	30 days
Tokelau	Visa required	
United Kingdom
Akrotiri and Dhekelia	Visa required	
Anguilla	eVisa	Holders of a valid visa issued by the United Kingdom do not require a visa.
Bermuda	Visa required	
British Indian Ocean Territory	Special permit required	Special permit required.
British Virgin Islands	Visa not required	
Cayman Islands	Visa required	
Falkland Islands	Visa required	
Gibraltar	Visa required	
Montserrat	Visa not required	6 months
Pitcairn Islands	Visa not required	14 days visa free and landing fee US$35 or tax of US$5 if not going ashore.
Ascension Island	eVisa	3 months within any year period
Saint Helena	eVisa	
Tristan da Cunha	Permission required	Permission to land required for 15/30 pounds sterling (yacht/ship passenger) for Tristan da Cunha Island or 20 pounds sterling for Gough Island, Inaccessible Island or Nightingale Islands.
South Georgia and the South Sandwich Islands	Permit required	Pre-arrival permit from the Commissioner required (72 hours/1 month for 110/160 pounds sterling).
Turks and Caicos Islands	Visa required	Holders of a valid visa issued by Canada, United Kingdom or the USA do not required a visa for a maximum stay of 90 days.
United States
American Samoa	Visa required	
Guam	Visa required	
Northern Mariana Islands	Visa required	
Puerto Rico	Visa required	
U.S. Virgin Islands	Visa required	
Antarctica and adjacent islands
Special permits required for Bouvet Island, British Antarctic Territory, French Southern and Antarctic Lands, Argentine Antarctica, (Australia) Australian Antarctic Territory, (Antártica Chilena Province) Chilean Antarctic Territory, (Australia) Heard Island and McDonald Islands, (Norway) Peter I Island, (Norway) Queen Maud Land, (New Zealand) Ross Dependency.

== See also ==
- Visa policy of Gambia
- Gambian passport
