= Ledbury Road =

Street in the Portobello area of London

Coordinates: 51°30′58″N 0°11′59″W

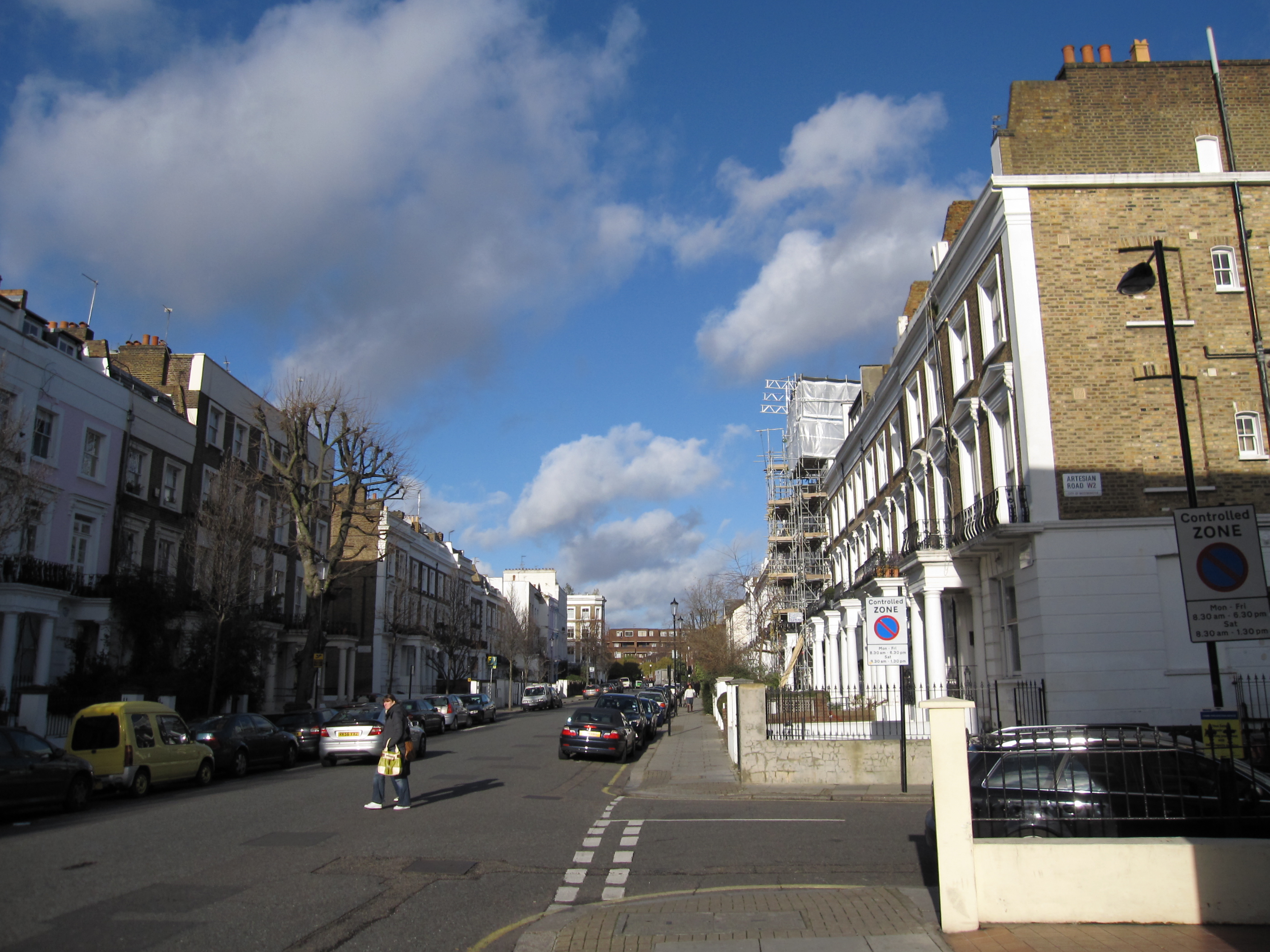
Ledbury Road (2009)

Ledbury Road is situated near Notting Hill Gate and within the area known as Portobello (best known for its market on the Portobello Road). The road is intersected by Westbourne Grove.

It has a number of restaurants and bars running down its length. Examples of these are The Ledbury and the Beach Blanket Babylon bar. The road is also home to a number of fashionable boutiques including Sweaty Betty and the independent lifestyle boutique Wolf & Badger. The High Commission of Gambia is also located on the road. Well known local residents include Mike Atherton (former England Cricket captain) and Carol Wyatt (artist). English broadcaster Jeremy Clarkson is a former resident.

The road has appeared in many films, including Notting Hill (1999) and Match Point (2005), and is often used for the purpose of filming TV street interviews owing to its glamorous reputation.
