= The Gambia–Russia relations =

- Gambia: Russia

The Gambia–Russia relations (Russian: Российско-гамбийские отношения) are the bilateral relationship between the two countries, The Gambia and Russia. Both countries have established diplomatic relations on July 17, 1965. Diplomatic relations were later established once again after the breakup of the Soviet Union.

== Relations ==
The Gambia maintains an embassy in Moscow, although former President Yahya Jammeh closed it for a time during the 2016–17 Gambian constitutional crisis. Russia has no corresponding embassy in Banjul, but the Russian embassy in Dakar in neighboring Senegal also represents Russian interests in the Gambia. There is also an Honorary Consulate. The Gambia and Russia have signed a cooperative military agreement for training and a visa waiver agreement for diplomats. The Gambia and Russia are also mutual participants in a number of international multilateral treaties and organizations.

Since independence, The Gambia has sent students for training Soviet and Russian universities such as the Peoples' Friendship University of Russia.

== See also ==
- Foreign relations of The Gambia
- Foreign relations of Russia
- Romanov Empire (micronation)
- List of ambassadors of Russia to Senegal - ambassadors have dual accreditation to The Gambia
