= The Ledbury =

Coordinates: 51.5167°N 0.2001°W

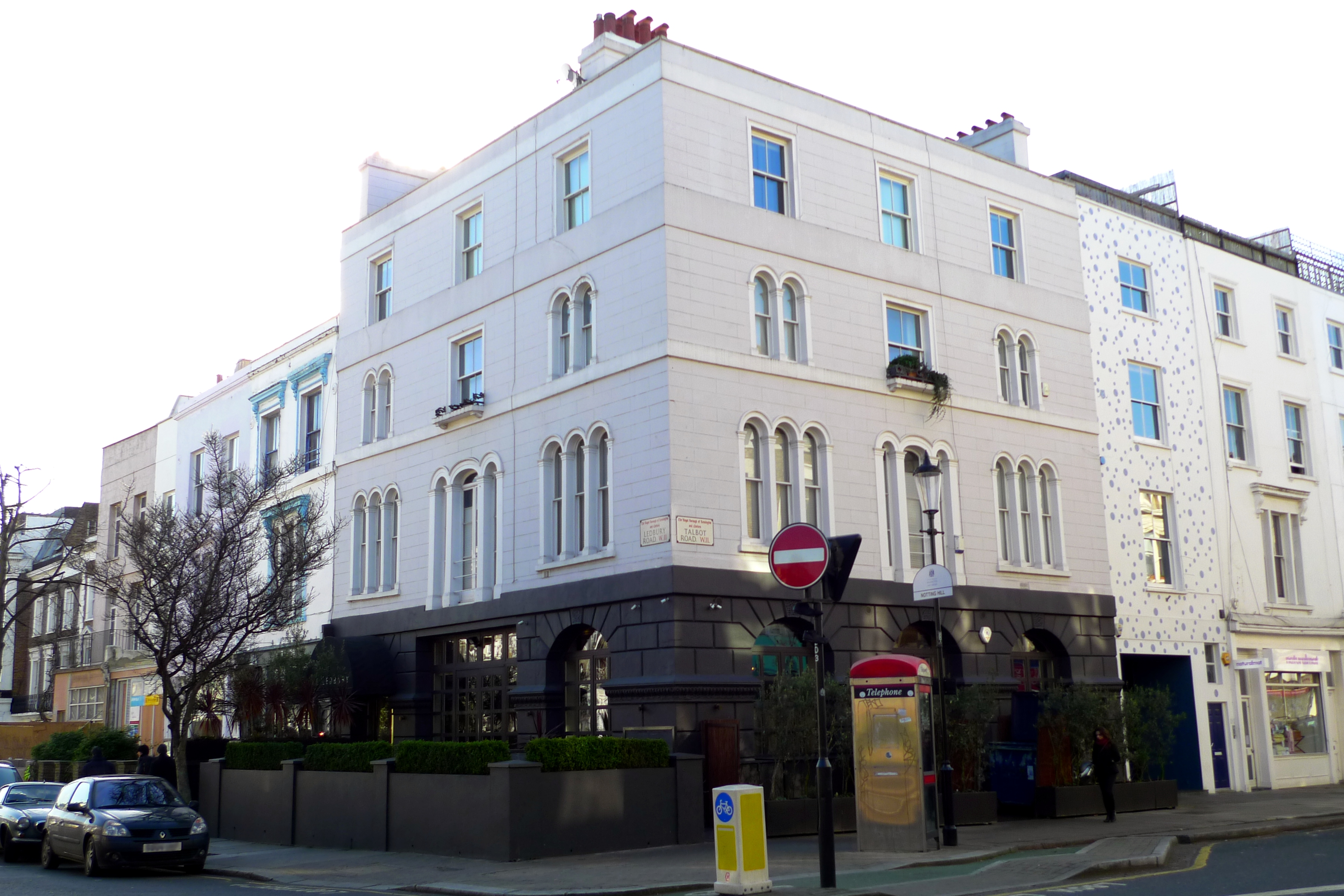
- The Ledbury, on 127 Ledbury Road
- Interactive map of The Ledbury

Restaurant information
- Established: 2005; 21 years ago (first iteration); February 2022; 4 years ago (reopening)
- Closed: 2020; 6 years ago (first iteration)
- Head chef: Brett Graham and Tom Spenceley
- Food type: Modern European
- Rating: Michelin stars AA Rosettes (2026)
- Location: Ledbury Road, Notting Hill, London, W11, United Kingdom
- Seating capacity: 45 (2022–present); 55 (2005–2020)
- Reservations: Yes
- Other information: Nearest station: Westbourne Park
- Website: Official website

The Ledbury is a restaurant located on Ledbury Road, Notting Hill, London, England. It held two Michelin stars from 2010 until 2021, when it lost them as it shut due to Covid-19 restrictions being impractical for the restaurant, making it ineligible for assessment by Michelin inspectors. It has also been featured in S.Pellegrino World's 50 Best Restaurants. The restaurant reopened in February 2022, after being closed for almost 2 years. It regained both Michelin stars in the 2023 Michelin Guide and was promoted to three Michelin stars in the 2024 Michelin guide.

The chef-patron is Brett Graham, and he has been received favourably by critics. Graham continues to actively run the kitchen alongside head chef Tom Spenceley.

== History ==
The restaurant opened in 2005. It was the sister restaurant of The Square, a two-Michelin-starred restaurant in Mayfair, London, with the same backers investing in both restaurants. The Square closed permanently in early 2020. The restaurant gained a Michelin star within a year of opening, but sales only increased by 2009. A second Michelin star followed in 2010. Also in 2010, it was awarded the Square Meal BMW Restaurant of the Year Award.

Amid the ongoing COVID-19 pandemic, Graham announced in June 2020 that the restaurant would remain closed indefinitely, citing one-metre social distancing measures in place as impractical to keep staff and customers safe. Due to its closure, The Ledbury lost its two Michelin stars from January 2021 until March 2023, when it regained both.

The Ledbury was refurbished and then reopened to the public in early February 2022. Its seating capacity was reduced from 55 to 45 in favor of a centre table to be used by the serving staff.

== Reception ==
Giles Coren visited the restaurant for The Times shortly after it opened. He described it as having a "hushed, moneyed feel" Terry Durack also reviewed the restaurant during 2005, for The Independent on Sunday. He described the restaurant as "seriously good", and thought it was off to a "very good start".

In 2008, Matthew Norman, writing in The Guardian, commented on its "recession-resistant prices" and gave it 9.25 out of 10. Jasper Gerard ate at the restaurant for The Daily Telegraph in 2010, describing some courses as "scrumptious", but he felt that the dessert options were a let down compared to the rest of the dishes on offer.

Harden's restaurant guide describes the food at The Ledbury as "genius" and scores the food as a one, service as a one and ambience as a two. It uses a scale of one to five, where one is high and five is low.

=== Awards ===
- The Ledbury became one of the Top Ten Restaurants for 2014 in S.Pellegrino World's 50 Best Restaurants.
- As of February 2024, the restaurant holds 3 stars in the Michelin Guide.
- 2012, S.Pellegrino World's 50 Best Restaurants in its second year listed, and was the highest climber on the list.
- In both 2010 and 2011, The Ledbury was voted the UK's top restaurant in Restaurant Magazine's 'National Restaurant Awards'.
- In 2011, it was also voted the best restaurant in London by Zagat, Harden's and the Sunday Times.

== Chef and co-restaurateur ==
The restaurant's chef-patron Brett Graham was born in Newcastle, New South Wales, Australia in 1979. He worked as an apprentice at a fish restaurant called Scratchleys. Then at age 18, he moved to a Sydney restaurant, Banc. He immigrated to London in the early 2000s after winning the Josephine Pignolet Young Chef of the Year Award in Sydney. He had previously worked at The Square as a sous chef for three and a half years under its chef-patron, Phil Howard. Graham won the Young Chef of the Year in 2002 from the Restaurant Association.

== See also ==
- List of Michelin 3-star restaurants in the United Kingdom
- April Partridge
