= April Partridge =

British chef

April Lily Partridge (born 1993) is a British chef. She is currently Sous Chef at The Ledbury in London.

Partridge is from Chingford. She worked for two weeks in the Reform Club kitchen in Pall Mall at the end of her GCSEs. She won the London heat of the nationwide Rotary Young Chef competition. She placed in the top four and won a day in The Ivy's kitchen. She stayed there, eventually earning an Ivy scholarship.

Partridge attended Westminster Kingsway College on a professional chef scholarship and aspires to become a television chef. In 2012, while she was commis chef at the Ivy, Partridge received the Hot Talent award as part of Hotelympia. She was named Best Young Chef in the Observer Food Monthly Awards in 2014. Senior chef at the Ivy, Gary Lee, has described her as "more methodical, artistic, hard working and consistent than some boys with 10 years' experience... She might be better than me."
