= Foreign relations of the Gambia =

The Gambia followed a formal policy of non-alignment throughout most of former President Sir Dawda Jawara's tenure. It maintained close relations with the United Kingdom, Senegal, and other African countries. The July 1994 coup strained The Gambia's relationship with Western powers, particularly the United States. Starting in 1995, President Yahya Jammeh established diplomatic relations with several additional countries, including Libya, the Republic of China (on Taiwan, before 2013), and Cuba. As scholars on Gambia's foreign policy have argued, throughout Jammeh's period, the country's foreign policy was a shifting sand, with little of direction.

Amat Jeng, a scholar on The Gambia's foreign policy, argues that "The Gambia under Jammeh was not constrained by the bureaucratic hurly-burly which characterizes the foreign policy terrain of big democracies. In The Gambia, the Ministry of Foreign Affairs (MFA) had, on several occasions, been left in a vacuum, thereby placing it under the Office of the President. Between 1997 and 2013, the MFA had been occupied by more than 18 different ministers in more than 20 sworn-in occasions. This qualifies the argument that Jammeh had always had the power to fire ministers at will. In North Korea, the MFA has been occupied only by ten different foreign ministers since 1948." During Yahya Jammeh's presidency, The Gambia's foreign relations were characterized by a mix of isolationism, confrontational diplomacy, and strategic alliances. Jammeh's regime frequently clashed with Western nations over human rights issues, resulting in strained relations with the European Union and the United States. He often pursued alliances with non-Western countries, such as China, Iran, and Libya, to counterbalance Western influence and gain economic support. His administration also pulled The Gambia out of the Commonwealth in 2013, accusing the organization of neo-colonialism. Jammeh's unpredictable and authoritarian leadership style made Gambia's foreign policy under his rule highly controversial and often isolated the country on the international stage.

Despite these tensions, Jammeh's government engaged in regional diplomacy within West Africa, maintaining membership in the Economic Community of West African States (ECOWAS), though relations with neighboring Senegal were often tense due to border disputes and differing political stances. Jammeh's erratic foreign policy choices ultimately contributed to The Gambia's diplomatic isolation until his ouster in 2017.

During his last years, the EU grew increasingly intolerant of Jammeh's iron-fist rule. Consequently, Brussels withheld millions of euros to The Gambia. Jammeh fired back by expelling the EU's top diplomat in the country after he had accused the bloc and human rights activists of conniving to besmirch the image of his government for its stance on homosexuality.

== Diplomatic relations ==
List of countries which the Gambia maintains diplomatic relations with:

#	Country	Date
1	United Kingdom	18 February 1965
2	Japan	18 February 1965
3	Turkey	18 February 1965
4	South Korea	21 April 1965
5	Germany	26 April 1965
6	Senegal	13 May 1965
7	Lebanon	24 May 1965
8	France	28 May 1965
9	Ghana	28 May 1965
10	Nigeria	28 May 1965
11	Egypt	31 May 1965
12	Israel	3 June 1965
13	India	25 June 1965
14	Russia	17 July 1965
15	United States	9 August 1965
16	Spain	14 August 1965
17	Italy	30 October 1965
18	Liberia	3 November 1965
19	Mauritania	15 December 1965
20	Serbia	1965
21	Belgium	7 February 1966
22	Switzerland	30 March 1966
23	Morocco	29 June 1966
24	Netherlands	1 August 1966
25	Canada	24 August 1966
26	Ethiopia	17 October 1966
27	Sierra Leone	10 December 1966
28	Pakistan	1967
29	Sweden	1968
30	Austria	1971
31	Hungary	14 June 1971
32	Mali	25 June 1971
33	Romania	30 July 1971
34	Guinea	6 August 1971
35	Czech Republic	19 February 1972
36	Algeria	22 May 1972
37	Tunisia	28 December 1972
38	North Korea	2 March 1973
39	Vietnam	30 October 1973
40	Libya	1973
41	Saudi Arabia	9 May 1974
42	Guinea-Bissau	10 August 1974
43	Venezuela	17 August 1974
44	Kuwait	29 August 1974
45	China	14 December 1974
46	Zambia	30 December 1974
47	Bangladesh	1974
48	Poland	21 January 1975
49	Iran	27 January 1975
50	Cameroon	8 March 1975
51	Luxembourg	15 April 1975
52	United Arab Emirates	9 July 1975
53	Ivory Coast	8 August 1975
54	Mexico	15 August 1975
55	Portugal	8 September 1976
56	Malta	21 October 1976
57	Uganda	16 November 1976
58	Togo	10 May 1977
59	Suriname	17 October 1977
60	Qatar	22 January 1978
61	Cape Verde	January 1978
—	Holy See	7 June 1978
62	Denmark	January 1979
63	Brazil	11 May 1979
64	Cuba	19 May 1979
65	Argentina	15 January 1980
66	Oman	4 February 1980
67	Democratic Republic of the Congo	7 January 1981
68	Niger	23 February 1981
69	Australia	10 July 1981
70	Malaysia	1981
71	Iraq	16 February 1982
72	Indonesia	30 May 1982
73	Bahrain	6 February 1983
74	Norway	8 February 1983
75	Thailand	15 February 1985
76	Yemen	28 March 1985
77	Bahamas	1985
78	Finland	1 September 1988
79	Colombia	3 October 1988
80	Maldives	3 July 1989
—	State of Palestine	1989
81	Azerbaijan	11 November 1994
82	Slovakia	18 August 1995
83	Philippines	26 June 1996
84	Bosnia and Herzegovina	12 July 1996
85	Latvia	12 March 1998
86	South Africa	7 August 1998
87	North Macedonia	29 September 1998
88	Croatia	16 October 1998
89	Bulgaria	11 June 1999
90	Ukraine	2 July 1999
91	Costa Rica	26 October 1999
92	Lithuania	17 February 2000
93	Kyrgyzstan	30 June 2000
94	Cyprus	8 December 2000
95	Ireland	29 May 2001
96	Estonia	30 May 2001
97	Belarus	10 April 2002
98	Greece	25 July 2002
99	Mauritius	4 March 2003
100	Iceland	11 May 2004
101	Madagascar	20 July 2004
102	San Marino	29 October 2004
103	Slovenia	25 August 2005
104	Guatemala	25 September 2006
105	Burkina Faso	20 October 2006
106	Jordan	13 March 2007
107	Uruguay	25 September 2007
108	Sudan	13 February 2008
109	Kenya	15 October 2008
110	Saint Vincent and the Grenadines	2 March 2009
111	Guyana	24 September 2009
112	Georgia	21 April 2010
113	Paraguay	22 April 2010
114	Cambodia	28 April 2010
115	Myanmar	13 January 2011
116	Kazakhstan	26 April 2011
117	Solomon Islands	19 May 2011
118	Jamaica	29 November 2011
119	Ecuador	1 December 2011
120	Mongolia	22 December 2011
121	Moldova	12 June 2012
122	Zimbabwe	19 July 2012
123	Dominica	26 July 2012
124	Tuvalu	26 July 2012
125	Turkmenistan	9 August 2012
126	Montenegro	16 August 2012
127	Kiribati	27 September 2012
128	Nauru	27 September 2012
129	Rwanda	14 July 2014
130	Fiji	24 October 2014
131	Singapore	23 January 2015
132	Brunei	21 January 2016
133	Saint Lucia	13 April 2016
134	Saint Kitts and Nevis	6 June 2016
—	Kosovo	23 September 2016
135	Namibia	11 December 2017
136	Tajikistan	18 December 2017
137	Armenia	9 October 2018
138	Malawi	19 February 2019
139	Tanzania	25 April 2019
140	Dominican Republic	10 May 2019
141	Sri Lanka	10 May 2019
142	Nicaragua	8 July 2019
143	Nepal	24 May 2021
144	Djibouti	1 July 2021
145	Chad	31 August 2021
146	Gabon	1 September 2021
147	Angola	3 September 2021
148	Comoros	11 October 2021
149	Burundi	15 October 2021
150	Equatorial Guinea	29 May 2022
151	Republic of the Congo	17 June 2022
152	Somalia	22 June 2022
—	Sovereign Military Order of Malta	20 September 2023
153	Belize	22 September 2023
154	Seychelles	16 November 2023
155	Botswana	13 February 2024
156	Uzbekistan	14 March 2024
157	Marshall Islands	25 September 2024
158	Mozambique	11 June 2025
159	Grenada	18 June 2025
160	South Sudan	24 September 2025
161	El Salvador	24 February 2026
162	Trinidad and Tobago	9 March 2026
163	Eritrea	23 October 2026
164	Benin	Unknown

== Bilateral relations ==
=== Africa ===
Country	Formal Relations Began	Notes
Benin		The two countries maintain diplomatic relations.

=== Asia ===
Country	Formal Relations Began	Notes
Azerbaijan	11 November 1994	See Azerbaijan-The Gambia relations On November 11, 1994, Azerbaijan and the Gambia signed the Protocol on the establishment of diplomatic relations.
China	14 December 1974	See China–Gambia relations China and Gambia reestablished diplomatic relations on 17 March 2016.
India	25 June 1965	See The Gambia–India relations Both countries established diplomatic relations on 25 June 1965
Malaysia	1981	Both countries established diplomatic relations in 1981 See The Gambia–Malaysia relations The Malaysian embassy in Dakar is accredited to The Gambia while the Gambian embassy in Abu Dhabi is accredited to Malaysia. The relations are friendly and warm.
Taiwan	—	See The Gambia–Taiwan relations The Gambia firstly established diplomatic relations with the Republic of China (Taiwan) in 1968, three years after The Gambia gained its independence from the United Kingdom. In 1974, The Gambia switched diplomatic relations from ROC to the People's Republic of China but switched again back to ROC in 1995. In December 2006, the Premier of the Republic of China (Taiwan) completed an official visit to the Gambia in part to pay respects to President Jammeh's inaugural ceremony and to donate funds for medical purposes. The Gambian Secretary of State reciprocated with an official visit to Taiwan. There have been several occasional official visits between the two countries. The People's Republic of China cut ties with the Gambia in 1995 after the latter established diplomatic links with the Republic of China (Taiwan). After 18 years, however, Gambian President Yahya Jammeh announced the breaking of diplomatic ties with ROC to recognize PRC on 14 November 2013 citing national strategic interest, immediately even after receiving US$6.6 million worth of aid from the Republic of China (Taiwan) earlier. The ROC officially terminated its ties with The Gambia four days later on 18 November 2013. In an unprecedented move, however, the PRC did not respond to Gambia's offer to establish diplomatic relations, presumably because of its desire to improve relations with Taiwan. The PRC and Gambia reestablished diplomatic relations on 17 March 2016.
Turkey	18 February 1965	The Gambia has an embassy in Ankara.; Turkey has an embassy in Banjul.; There are direct flights from Istanbul to Banjul since August 2018.

=== Americas ===
Country	Formal Relations Began	Notes
United States	9 August 1965	See The Gambia–United States relations Both countries established diplomatic relations on 9 August 1965 U.S. policy seeks to build improved relations with the Gambia on the basis of historical ties, mutual respect, democratic rule, human rights, and adherence to UN resolutions on counterterrorism, conflict diamonds, and other forms of trafficking. In accordance with U.S. law, most direct bilateral development and military assistance to the Gambia was suspended because of the 1994 coup d'état. U.S. assistance continues, however, in the form of food aid administered through Catholic Relief Services, support for democracy and human rights projects, and the financing of girls' secondary education. In addition, the Peace Corps maintains a large program with about eighty volunteers engaged in the environment, public health, and education sectors, mainly at the village level. The Gambia is also a member of the International Criminal Court with a Bilateral Immunity Agreement of protection for the US-military (as covered under Article 98).

=== Europe ===
Country	Formal Relations Began	Notes
Belgium		Gambia has an embassy in Brussels.
Greece		The two countries maintain diplomatic relations.
Italy		Italy is represented in Gambia through its embassy in Dakar, Senegal.
Luxembourg		Gambia is represented in Luxembourg through its embassy in Brussels.
Netherlands		Gambia is represented in the Netherlands through its embassy in Brussels.
Russia	17 July 1965	See The Gambia–Russia relations Both countries established diplomatic relations on 17 July 1965.
Spain	14 August 1965	See The Gambia–Spain relations Both countries established diplomatic relations on 14 August 1965
United Kingdom	18 February 1965	See The Gambia–United Kingdom relations The Gambia established diplomatic relations with the United Kingdom on 18 February 1965.: The Gambia maintains a High Commission in London.; The United Kingdom is accredited to Ghana through its High Commission in Banjul.; The UK governed the Gambia from 1816 to 1965, when it achieved full independence. Both countries share common membership of the Atlantic Co-operation Pact, the Commonwealth, the International Criminal Court, and the World Trade Organization. Bilaterally the two countries have a Double Taxation Convention, and an Investment Agreement. An 1889 agreement with France established the present boundaries. The Gambia became a British Crown Colony, British Gambia, divided for administrative purposes into the colony (city of Banjul and the surrounding area) and the protectorate (remainder of the territory). The Gambia received its own executive and legislative councils in 1901 and gradually progressed toward self-government. It passed a 1906 ordinance abolishing slavery. During World War II, Gambian troops fought with the Allies in Burma. Banjul (then named Bathurst) served as an air stop for the U.S. Army Air Corps and a port of call for Allied naval convoys. U. S. President Franklin D. Roosevelt stopped overnight in Banjul en route to and from the Casablanca Conference in 1943, marking the first visit to the African continent by a sitting American president. After World War II, the pace of constitutional reform increased. Following general elections in 1962, the United Kingdom granted full internal self-governance in the following year. The Gambia achieved independence on 18 February 1965, as a constitutional monarchy within the Commonwealth of Nations.

== The Gambia and the Commonwealth of Nations ==
The Gambia was a member of the Commonwealth of Nations from its independence in 1965 until its withdrawal in October 2013.

After presidential elections in 2016, the winning candidate Adama Barrow promised to return The Gambia to the Commonwealth. On 14 February 2017, The Gambia began the process of returning and formally presented its application to re-join to Secretary-General Patricia Scotland on 22 January 2018. Boris Johnson, who became the first British Foreign Secretary to visit The Gambia since the country gained independence in 1965, announced that the British government welcomed The Gambia's return to the Commonwealth.

== See also ==
- List of diplomatic missions in the Gambia
- List of diplomatic missions of the Gambia
