= High Commission of The Gambia, London =

Diplomatic mission of The Gambia in the United Kingdom

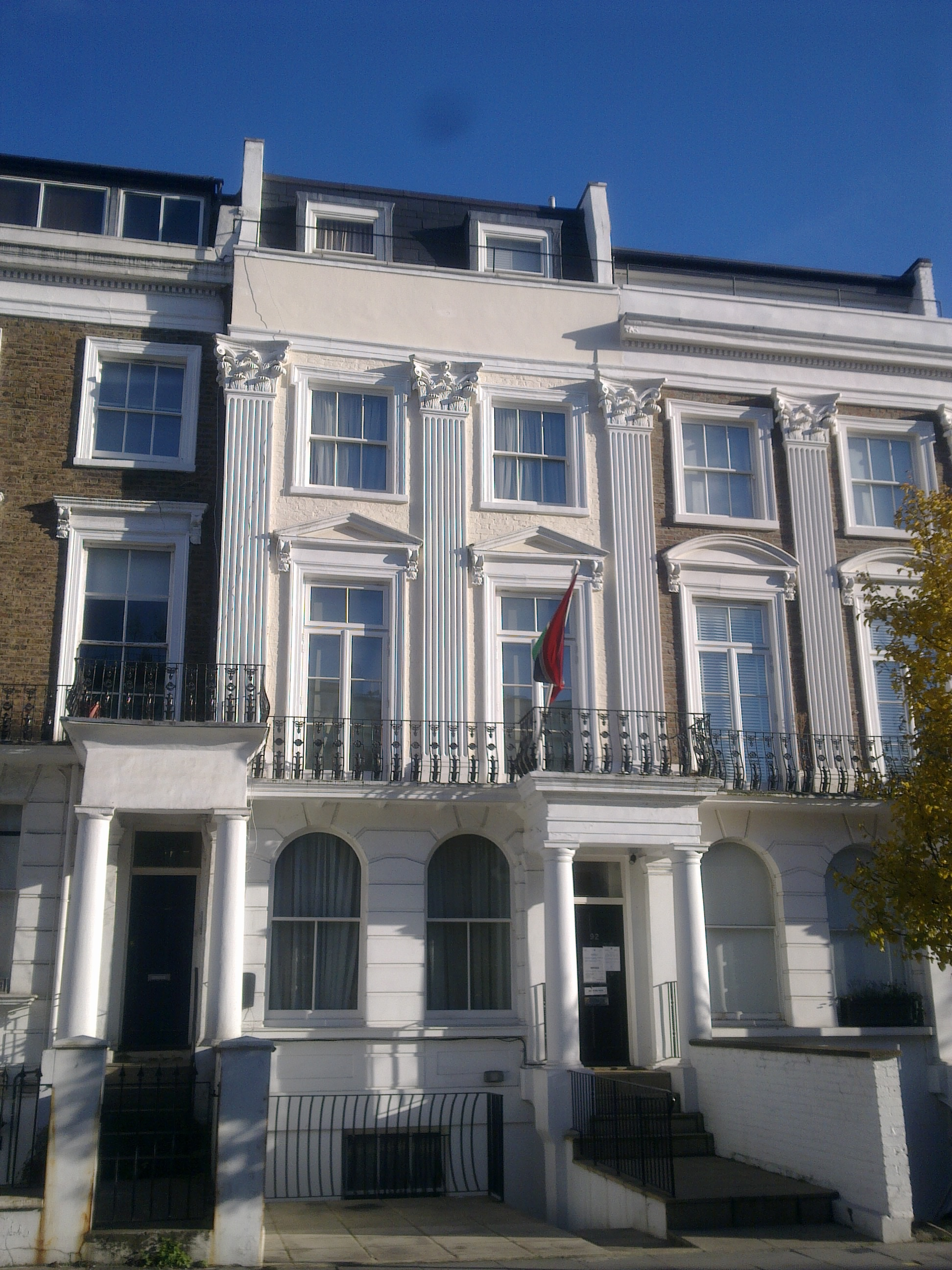
- Location: Bayswater, London
- Address: 92 Ledbury Road, London, W11 2AH
- Coordinates: 51°30′58″N 0°11′58.3″W
- High Commissioner: Fatou Bensouda

The High Commission of The Gambia, London is the diplomatic mission of The Gambia in the United Kingdom. It is located south of Hyde Park and Kensington High Street, on Kensington Court in West London.

Between October 2013 and February 2018, it was known as the Embassy of The Gambia due to The Gambia's temporary withdrawal from the Commonwealth, thanks to Yahya Jammeh.

Protests have been common outside of the building. In 2013, by people opposed to the government of Yahya Jammeh and also in 2013 by those opposed to alleged homophobia in the country.

The Gambia returned to its membership of the Commonwealth on 8 February 2018. Therefore, Francis Blain the former Ambassador became the High Commissioner. He has been replaced since 3 August 2022 by Fatou Bensouda.
