= List of Michelin-starred restaurants in Greater London =

As of the 2026 guide, there are 88 restaurants in Greater London with a Michelin-star rating, a rating system used by the Michelin Guide to grade restaurants based on their quality.

== 2020–2026 lists ==
Key
1 Michelin star	One Michelin star
2 Michelin stars	Two Michelin stars
3 Michelin stars	Three Michelin stars
—	The restaurant did not receive a star that year
Closed	The restaurant is no longer open

Michelin-starred restaurants
Name	Cuisine	Location	2020	2021	2022	2023	2024	2025	2026
64 Goodge Street	French	Camden	—	—	—	—	—	1 Michelin star	1 Michelin star
1890 by Gordon Ramsay	French	Westminster	—	—	—	—	1 Michelin star	1 Michelin star	1 Michelin star
A. Wong	Chinese	Westminster	1 Michelin star	2 Michelin stars	2 Michelin stars	2 Michelin stars	2 Michelin stars	2 Michelin stars	2 Michelin stars
Akoko	West African	Westminster	—	—	—	—	1 Michelin star	1 Michelin star	1 Michelin star
Alain Ducasse at The Dorchester	French	Westminster	3 Michelin stars	3 Michelin stars	3 Michelin stars	3 Michelin stars	3 Michelin stars	3 Michelin stars	3 Michelin stars
Alex Dilling at Hotel Café Royal	French	Westminster	—	—	—	2 Michelin stars	2 Michelin stars	2 Michelin stars	2 Michelin stars
Alyn Williams at the Westbury	Contemporary	Westminster	1 Michelin star	Closed					
Amaya	Indian	Westminster	1 Michelin star	1 Michelin star	1 Michelin star	1 Michelin star	1 Michelin star	1 Michelin star	1 Michelin star
Ambassadors Clubhouse	Indian	Westminster	—	—	—	—	—	—	1 Michelin star
Angler	Seafood	Islington	1 Michelin star	1 Michelin star	1 Michelin star	1 Michelin star	1 Michelin star	1 Michelin star	1 Michelin star
AngloThai	Thai	Westminster	—	—	—	—	—	1 Michelin star	1 Michelin star
Aquavit	Nordic	Westminster	1 Michelin star	—	—	Closed			
Aulis	British	Westminster	—	—	—	—	1 Michelin star	1 Michelin star	1 Michelin star
Barrafina Dean Street	Spanish	Westminster	1 Michelin star	1 Michelin star	1 Michelin star	1 Michelin star	—	—	—
Behind	British	Hackney	—	1 Michelin star	1 Michelin star	1 Michelin star	1 Michelin star	1 Michelin star	1 Michelin star
Benares	Indian	Westminster	—	1 Michelin star	1 Michelin star	1 Michelin star	1 Michelin star	1 Michelin star	1 Michelin star
Bonheur	Modern	Westminster	—	—	—	—	—	—	2 Michelin stars
Brat	British	Hackney	1 Michelin star	1 Michelin star	1 Michelin star	1 Michelin star	1 Michelin star	1 Michelin star	1 Michelin star
Brooklands	French	Westminster	—	—	—	—	2 Michelin stars	2 Michelin stars	2 Michelin stars
Caractère	French	Kensington and Chelsea	—	—	—	—	—	1 Michelin star	1 Michelin star
Casa Fofo	Mediterranean	Hackney	—	1 Michelin star	1 Michelin star	1 Michelin star	1 Michelin star	1 Michelin star	1 Michelin star
Céleste	French	Westminster	1 Michelin star	1 Michelin star	—	Closed			
Chez Bruce	French	Wandsworth	1 Michelin star	1 Michelin star	1 Michelin star	1 Michelin star	1 Michelin star	1 Michelin star	1 Michelin star
Chishuru	West African	Westminster	—	—	—	—	1 Michelin star	1 Michelin star	1 Michelin star
City Social	British	City of London	1 Michelin star	1 Michelin star	1 Michelin star	1 Michelin star	1 Michelin star	—	—
Claude Bosi at Bibendum	French	Kensington and Chelsea	2 Michelin stars	2 Michelin stars	2 Michelin stars	2 Michelin stars	2 Michelin stars	2 Michelin stars	Closed
Club Gascon	French	City of London	1 Michelin star	1 Michelin star	1 Michelin star	1 Michelin star	1 Michelin star	1 Michelin star	—
CORE by Clare Smyth	British	Kensington and Chelsea	2 Michelin stars	3 Michelin stars	3 Michelin stars	3 Michelin stars	3 Michelin stars	3 Michelin stars	3 Michelin stars
Corenucopia	British	Kensington and Chelsea	—	—	—	—	—	—	1 Michelin star
Cornerstone	Contemporary	Hackney	—	1 Michelin star	1 Michelin star	1 Michelin star	1 Michelin star	Closed	
Cornus	British	Westminster	—	—	—	—	—	1 Michelin star	1 Michelin star
Cycene	Modern	Tower Hamlets	—	—	—	1 Michelin star	1 Michelin star	1 Michelin star	1 Michelin star
Davies and Brook	British	Westminster	—	1 Michelin star	Closed				
Da Terra	Creative	Hackney	1 Michelin star	2 Michelin stars	2 Michelin stars	2 Michelin stars	2 Michelin stars	2 Michelin stars	2 Michelin stars
Dining Room at the Goring	British	Westminster	1 Michelin star	1 Michelin star	1 Michelin star	1 Michelin star	1 Michelin star	1 Michelin star	1 Michelin star
Dinner by Heston Blumenthal	British	Westminster	2 Michelin stars	2 Michelin stars	2 Michelin stars	2 Michelin stars	2 Michelin stars	2 Michelin stars	2 Michelin stars
Dorian	British	Kensington and Chelsea	—	—	—	—	1 Michelin star	1 Michelin star	1 Michelin star
DOSA	Korean	Westminster	—	—	—	—	—	1 Michelin star	Closed
Dysart Petersham	Modern	Richmond	1 Michelin star	1 Michelin star	1 Michelin star	1 Michelin star	1 Michelin star	1 Michelin star	1 Michelin star
Elystan Street	British	Kensington and Chelsea	1 Michelin star	1 Michelin star	1 Michelin star	1 Michelin star	1 Michelin star	1 Michelin star	1 Michelin star
Endo at the Rotunda	Japanese	Hammersmith and Fulham	1 Michelin star	1 Michelin star	1 Michelin star	1 Michelin star	1 Michelin star	1 Michelin star	1 Michelin star
Evelyn's Table	Modern	Westminster	—	—	1 Michelin star	1 Michelin star	1 Michelin star	1 Michelin star	1 Michelin star
Five Fields	British	Kensington and Chelsea	1 Michelin star	1 Michelin star	1 Michelin star	1 Michelin star	1 Michelin star	1 Michelin star	Closed
Frog by Adam Handling	Modern	Westminster	—	—	1 Michelin star	1 Michelin star	1 Michelin star	1 Michelin star	1 Michelin star
Galvin La Chapelle	French	Tower Hamlets	1 Michelin star	1 Michelin star	1 Michelin star	1 Michelin star	1 Michelin star	1 Michelin star	1 Michelin star
Gymkhana	Indian	Westminster	1 Michelin star	1 Michelin star	1 Michelin star	1 Michelin star	2 Michelin stars	2 Michelin stars	2 Michelin stars
Hakkasan Hanway Place	Chinese	Camden	1 Michelin star	1 Michelin star	1 Michelin star	1 Michelin star	—	Closed	
Hakkasan Mayfair	Chinese	Westminster	1 Michelin star	1 Michelin star	1 Michelin star	1 Michelin star	—	—	—
Hélène Darroze at The Connaught	Modern	Westminster	2 Michelin stars	3 Michelin stars	3 Michelin stars	3 Michelin stars	3 Michelin stars	3 Michelin stars	3 Michelin stars
HIDE	British	Westminster	1 Michelin star	1 Michelin star	1 Michelin star	1 Michelin star	1 Michelin star	1 Michelin star	1 Michelin star
Humble Chicken	Japanese	Westminster	—	—	—	—	1 Michelin star	2 Michelin stars	2 Michelin stars
Humo	Colombian	Westminster	—	—	—	—	1 Michelin star	1 Michelin star	—
Ikoyi	West African	Westminster	1 Michelin star	1 Michelin star	2 Michelin stars	2 Michelin stars	2 Michelin stars	2 Michelin stars	2 Michelin stars
Jamavar	Indian	Westminster	—	—	1 Michelin star	1 Michelin star	1 Michelin star	1 Michelin star	1 Michelin star
Kai Mayfair	Chinese	Westminster	1 Michelin star	1 Michelin star	1 Michelin star	1 Michelin star	1 Michelin star	—	—
Kerfield Arms	British	Southwark	—	—	—	—	—	—	1 Michelin star
Kitchen Table	Modern	Camden	2 Michelin stars	2 Michelin stars	2 Michelin stars	2 Michelin stars	2 Michelin stars	2 Michelin stars	2 Michelin stars
Kitchen W8	Modern	Kensington and Chelsea	1 Michelin star	1 Michelin star	1 Michelin star	1 Michelin star	1 Michelin star	1 Michelin star	1 Michelin star
KOL	Mexican	Westminster	—	—	1 Michelin star	1 Michelin star	1 Michelin star	1 Michelin star	1 Michelin star
La Dame de Pic	French	City of London	2 Michelin stars	2 Michelin stars	2 Michelin stars	2 Michelin stars	2 Michelin stars	2 Michelin stars	Closed
La Trompette	British	Hounslow	1 Michelin star	1 Michelin star	1 Michelin star	1 Michelin star	1 Michelin star	1 Michelin star	1 Michelin star
Labombe	Modern	Camden	—	—	—	—	—	—	1 Michelin star
Le Gavroche	French	Westminster	2 Michelin stars	2 Michelin stars	2 Michelin stars	2 Michelin stars	Closed		
Legado	Spanish	Hackney	—	—	—	—	—	—	1 Michelin star
Leroy	British	Hackney	1 Michelin star	1 Michelin star	1 Michelin star	1 Michelin star	—	Closed	
Lita	Mediterranean	Westminster	—	—	—	—	—	1 Michelin star	1 Michelin star
Locanda Locatelli	Italian	Westminster	1 Michelin star	1 Michelin star	1 Michelin star	1 Michelin star	1 Michelin star	Closed	
Luca	Italian	Islington	—	—	—	1 Michelin star	1 Michelin star	1 Michelin star	1 Michelin star
Lyle's	British	Hackney	1 Michelin star	1 Michelin star	1 Michelin star	1 Michelin star	1 Michelin star	1 Michelin star	Closed
Mãos	Portuguese	Hackney	1 Michelin star	1 Michelin star	1 Michelin star	Closed			
Marcus	British	Westminster	1 Michelin star	1 Michelin star	1 Michelin star	1 Michelin star	Closed		
Mauro Colagreco	Modern	Westminster	—	—	—	—	—	1 Michelin star	1 Michelin star
Michael Caines at the Stafford	British	Westminster	—	—	—	—	—	—	1 Michelin star
Mountain	Spanish	Westminster	—	—	—	—	1 Michelin star	1 Michelin star	1 Michelin star
Murano	Italian	Westminster	1 Michelin star	1 Michelin star	1 Michelin star	1 Michelin star	1 Michelin star	1 Michelin star	1 Michelin star
Muse	Creative	Kensington and Chelsea	—	1 Michelin star	1 Michelin star	1 Michelin star	1 Michelin star	1 Michelin star	1 Michelin star
OMA	Greek	Southwark	—	—	—	—	—	1 Michelin star	1 Michelin star
Ormer	British	Westminster	—	—	—	—	1 Michelin star	1 Michelin star	1 Michelin star
Pavyllon	French	Westminster	—	—	—	—	1 Michelin star	1 Michelin star	1 Michelin star
Pétrus	French	Westminster	1 Michelin star	1 Michelin star	1 Michelin star	1 Michelin star	1 Michelin star	1 Michelin star	1 Michelin star
Pied à Terre	French	Camden	1 Michelin star	1 Michelin star	1 Michelin star	1 Michelin star	1 Michelin star	1 Michelin star	1 Michelin star
Plates	Vegan	Hackney	—	—	—	—	—	1 Michelin star	1 Michelin star
Pollen Street Social	British	Westminster	1 Michelin star	1 Michelin star	1 Michelin star	1 Michelin star	1 Michelin star	Closed	
Portland	Modern	Westminster	1 Michelin star	1 Michelin star	1 Michelin star	1 Michelin star	1 Michelin star	1 Michelin star	1 Michelin star
Quilon Restaurant	Indian	Westminster	1 Michelin star	1 Michelin star	1 Michelin star	1 Michelin star	1 Michelin star	1 Michelin star	1 Michelin star
Restaurant Gordon Ramsay	French	Kensington and Chelsea	3 Michelin stars	3 Michelin stars	3 Michelin stars	3 Michelin stars	3 Michelin stars	3 Michelin stars	3 Michelin stars
Restaurant Gordon Ramsay High	British	City of London	—	—	—	—	—	—	1 Michelin star
Ritz Restaurant	British	Westminster	1 Michelin star	1 Michelin star	1 Michelin star	1 Michelin star	1 Michelin star	2 Michelin stars	2 Michelin stars
River Café	Italian	Hammersmith and Fulham	1 Michelin star	1 Michelin star	1 Michelin star	1 Michelin star	1 Michelin star	1 Michelin star	1 Michelin star
Roganic	British	Westminster	1 Michelin star	Closed					
Row on 5	Modern	Westminster	—	—	—	—	—	1 Michelin star	2 Michelin stars
Sabor	Spanish	Westminster	1 Michelin star	1 Michelin star	1 Michelin star	1 Michelin star	1 Michelin star	1 Michelin star	1 Michelin star
Seven Park Place	British	Westminster	1 Michelin star	1 Michelin star	1 Michelin star	—	Closed		
Sketch	French	Westminster	3 Michelin stars	3 Michelin stars	3 Michelin stars	3 Michelin stars	3 Michelin stars	3 Michelin stars	3 Michelin stars
Social Eating House	Contemporary	Westminster	1 Michelin star	—	—	—	Closed		
Sola	American	Westminster	—	1 Michelin star	1 Michelin star	1 Michelin star	1 Michelin star	1 Michelin star	1 Michelin star
Sollip	Korean	Southwark	—	—	1 Michelin star	1 Michelin star	1 Michelin star	1 Michelin star	1 Michelin star
Somssi	Korean	Westminster	—	—	—	—	—	—	1 Michelin star
St. Barts	British	City of London	—	—	—	1 Michelin star	1 Michelin star	1 Michelin star	1 Michelin star
St. JOHN	British	Islington	1 Michelin star	1 Michelin star	1 Michelin star	1 Michelin star	1 Michelin star	1 Michelin star	1 Michelin star
Story	Modern	Southwark	1 Michelin star	2 Michelin stars	2 Michelin stars	2 Michelin stars	2 Michelin stars	2 Michelin stars	2 Michelin stars
Sushi Kanesaka	Japanese	Westminster	—	—	—	—	1 Michelin star	1 Michelin star	1 Michelin star
Taku	Japanese	Westminster	—	—	—	1 Michelin star	1 Michelin star	1 Michelin star	1 Michelin star
Texture	Nordic	Westminster	1 Michelin star	Closed					
The Clove Club	British	Hackney	1 Michelin star	1 Michelin star	2 Michelin stars	2 Michelin stars	2 Michelin stars	2 Michelin stars	2 Michelin stars
The Glasshouse	French	Richmond	1 Michelin star	1 Michelin star	1 Michelin star	Closed			
The Greenhouse	French	Westminster	2 Michelin stars	2 Michelin stars	Closed				
The Harwood Arms	British	Hammersmith and Fulham	1 Michelin star	1 Michelin star	1 Michelin star	1 Michelin star	1 Michelin star	1 Michelin star	1 Michelin star
The Ledbury	Modern	Kensington and Chelsea	2 Michelin stars	Closed		2 Michelin stars	3 Michelin stars	3 Michelin stars	3 Michelin stars
The Ninth	Mediterranean	Camden	1 Michelin star	1 Michelin star	1 Michelin star	1 Michelin star	1 Michelin star	1 Michelin star	1 Michelin star
The Square	French	Westminster	1 Michelin star	Closed					
Tom Brown at the Capital	Seafood	Kensington and Chelsea	—	—	—	—	—	—	1 Michelin star
Trinity	British	Lambeth	1 Michelin star	1 Michelin star	1 Michelin star	1 Michelin star	1 Michelin star	1 Michelin star	1 Michelin star
Trishna	Indian	Westminster	1 Michelin star	1 Michelin star	1 Michelin star	1 Michelin star	1 Michelin star	1 Michelin star	1 Michelin star
Trivet	Modern	Southwark	—	—	1 Michelin star	1 Michelin star	2 Michelin stars	2 Michelin stars	2 Michelin stars
Umu	Japanese	Westminster	2 Michelin stars	1 Michelin star	1 Michelin star	1 Michelin star	1 Michelin star	1 Michelin star	1 Michelin star
Veeraswamy	Indian	Westminster	1 Michelin star	1 Michelin star	1 Michelin star	1 Michelin star	1 Michelin star	1 Michelin star	1 Michelin star
Wild Honey St James	British	Westminster	—	—	1 Michelin star	1 Michelin star	1 Michelin star	1 Michelin star	1 Michelin star
Reference									

== 2010–2019 lists ==
Key
1 Michelin star	One Michelin star
2 Michelin stars	Two Michelin stars
3 Michelin stars	Three Michelin stars
—	The restaurant did not receive a star that year
Closed	The restaurant is no longer open

Michelin-starred restaurants
Name	Cuisine	Location	2010	2011	2012	2013	2014	2015	2016	2017	2018	2019
A. Wong	Chinese	Westminster	—	—	—	—	—	—	—	—	1 Michelin star	1 Michelin star
Alain Ducasse at The Dorchester	French	Westminster	3 Michelin stars	3 Michelin stars	3 Michelin stars	3 Michelin stars	3 Michelin stars	3 Michelin stars	3 Michelin stars	3 Michelin stars	3 Michelin stars	3 Michelin stars
Alyn Williams at the Westbury	Contemporary	Westminster	—	—	—	1 Michelin star	1 Michelin star	1 Michelin star	1 Michelin star	1 Michelin star	1 Michelin star	1 Michelin star
Amaya	Indian	Westminster	1 Michelin star	1 Michelin star	1 Michelin star	1 Michelin star	1 Michelin star	1 Michelin star	1 Michelin star	1 Michelin star	1 Michelin star	1 Michelin star
Ametsa (Note: Restaurant closed in 2020)	Spanish	Westminster	—	—	—	—	1 Michelin star	1 Michelin star	1 Michelin star	1 Michelin star	1 Michelin star	—
Angler	Seafood	Islington	—	—	—	—	1 Michelin star	1 Michelin star	1 Michelin star	1 Michelin star	1 Michelin star	1 Michelin star
Apsleys	Italian	Westminster	1 Michelin star	1 Michelin star	1 Michelin star	1 Michelin star	1 Michelin star	Closed				
Aquavit	Nordic	Westminster	—	—	—	—	—	—	—	—	1 Michelin star	1 Michelin star
Arbutus	British	Westminster	1 Michelin star	1 Michelin star	1 Michelin star	1 Michelin star	1 Michelin star	1 Michelin star	1 Michelin star	Closed		
Barrafina Dean Street	Spanish	Westminster	—	—	—	—	—	1 Michelin star	1 Michelin star	1 Michelin star	1 Michelin star	1 Michelin star
Benares	Indian	Westminster	1 Michelin star	1 Michelin star	1 Michelin star	1 Michelin star	1 Michelin star	1 Michelin star	1 Michelin star	1 Michelin star	1 Michelin star	1 Michelin star
Bingham Restaurant	British	Richmond	1 Michelin star	1 Michelin star	—	—	—	—	—	—	—	—
Bo London	Chinese	Westminster	—	—	—	—	1 Michelin star	Closed				
Bonhams (Note: Restaurant closed in 2020)	European	Westminster	—	—	—	—	—	—	1 Michelin star	1 Michelin star	1 Michelin star	1 Michelin star
Brasserie Chavot	French	Westminster	—	—	—	—	1 Michelin star	1 Michelin star	1 Michelin star	Closed		
Brat	British	Hackney	—	—	—	—	—	—	—	—	—	1 Michelin star
Céleste	French	Westminster	—	—	—	—	—	—	—	1 Michelin star	1 Michelin star	1 Michelin star
Chapter One	Modern	Bromley	1 Michelin star	1 Michelin star	1 Michelin star	1 Michelin star	1 Michelin star	—	—	—	—	—
Chez Bruce	French	Wandsworth	1 Michelin star	1 Michelin star	1 Michelin star	1 Michelin star	1 Michelin star	1 Michelin star	1 Michelin star	1 Michelin star	1 Michelin star	1 Michelin star
City Social	British	City of London	—	—	—	—	—	1 Michelin star	1 Michelin star	1 Michelin star	1 Michelin star	1 Michelin star
Claude Bosi at Bibendum	French	Kensington and Chelsea	—	—	—	—	—	—	—	—	2 Michelin stars	2 Michelin stars
Club Gascon	French	City of London	1 Michelin star	1 Michelin star	1 Michelin star	1 Michelin star	1 Michelin star	1 Michelin star	1 Michelin star	1 Michelin star	1 Michelin star	1 Michelin star
CORE by Clare Smyth	British	Kensington and Chelsea	—	—	—	—	—	—	—	—	—	2 Michelin stars
Dabbous	Modern	Westminster	—	—	—	1 Michelin star	1 Michelin star	1 Michelin star	1 Michelin star	1 Michelin star	Closed	
Dining Room at the Goring	British	Westminster	—	—	—	—	—	—	1 Michelin star	1 Michelin star	1 Michelin star	1 Michelin star
Dinner by Heston Blumenthal	British	Westminster	—	—	1 Michelin star	1 Michelin star	2 Michelin stars	2 Michelin stars	2 Michelin stars	2 Michelin stars	2 Michelin stars	2 Michelin stars
Ellory	British	Hackney	—	—	—	—	—	—	—	1 Michelin star	1 Michelin star	Closed
Elystan Street	British	Kensington and Chelsea	—	—	—	—	—	—	—	—	1 Michelin star	1 Michelin star
Fera at Claridge's (Note: Restaurant closed in 2020)	British	Westminster	—	—	—	—	—	1 Michelin star	1 Michelin star	1 Michelin star	1 Michelin star	1 Michelin star
Five Fields	British	Kensington and Chelsea	—	—	—	—	—	—	—	1 Michelin star	1 Michelin star	1 Michelin star
Galvin at Windows (Note: Restaurant lost its star in 2020 and closed in 2024)	French	Westminster	1 Michelin star	1 Michelin star	1 Michelin star	1 Michelin star	1 Michelin star	1 Michelin star	1 Michelin star	1 Michelin star	1 Michelin star	1 Michelin star
Galvin La Chapelle	French	Tower Hamlets	—	1 Michelin star	—	1 Michelin star	1 Michelin star	1 Michelin star	1 Michelin star	1 Michelin star	1 Michelin star	1 Michelin star
Gauthier Soho	Vegan	Westminster	—	1 Michelin star	1 Michelin star	—	—	—	—	—	—	—
Gymkhana	Indian	Westminster	—	—	—	—	—	1 Michelin star	1 Michelin star	1 Michelin star	1 Michelin star	1 Michelin star
Hakkasan Hanway Place	Chinese	Camden	1 Michelin star	1 Michelin star	1 Michelin star	1 Michelin star	1 Michelin star	1 Michelin star	1 Michelin star	1 Michelin star	1 Michelin star	1 Michelin star
Hakkasan Mayfair	Chinese	Westminster	—	—	1 Michelin star	1 Michelin star	1 Michelin star	1 Michelin star	1 Michelin star	1 Michelin star	1 Michelin star	1 Michelin star
Hedone (Note: Restaurant closed in 2020)	European	Hounslow	—	—	—	1 Michelin star	1 Michelin star	1 Michelin star	1 Michelin star	1 Michelin star	1 Michelin star	1 Michelin star
Hélène Darroze at The Connaught	Modern	Westminster	1 Michelin star	2 Michelin stars	2 Michelin stars	2 Michelin stars	2 Michelin stars	2 Michelin stars	2 Michelin stars	2 Michelin stars	2 Michelin stars	2 Michelin stars
Hibiscus	French	Westminster	2 Michelin stars	2 Michelin stars	2 Michelin stars	2 Michelin stars	2 Michelin stars	2 Michelin stars	2 Michelin stars	Closed		
HIDE	British	Westminster	—	—	—	—	—	—	—	—	—	1 Michelin star
HKK	Chinese	Hackney	—	—	—	—	1 Michelin star	1 Michelin star	1 Michelin star	1 Michelin star	1 Michelin star	Closed
Ikoyi	West African	Westminster	—	—	—	—	—	—	—	—	—	1 Michelin star
Jamavar	Indian	Westminster	—	—	—	—	—	—	—	—	1 Michelin star	—
Kai Mayfair	Chinese	Westminster	1 Michelin star	1 Michelin star	1 Michelin star	1 Michelin star	1 Michelin star	1 Michelin star	1 Michelin star	1 Michelin star	1 Michelin star	1 Michelin star
Kitchen Table	Modern	Camden	—	—	—	—	—	1 Michelin star	1 Michelin star	1 Michelin star	1 Michelin star	2 Michelin stars
Kitchen W8	Modern	Kensington and Chelsea	—	1 Michelin star	1 Michelin star	1 Michelin star	1 Michelin star	1 Michelin star	1 Michelin star	1 Michelin star	1 Michelin star	1 Michelin star
L'Atelier De Joel Robuchon (Note: Restaurant closed in 2020)	French	Westminster	2 Michelin stars	2 Michelin stars	2 Michelin stars	2 Michelin stars	1 Michelin star	1 Michelin star	1 Michelin star	1 Michelin star	1 Michelin star	1 Michelin star
L'Autre Pied	French	Westminster	1 Michelin star	1 Michelin star	1 Michelin star	1 Michelin star	1 Michelin star	1 Michelin star	1 Michelin star	—	Closed	
La Dame de Pic	French	City of London	—	—	—	—	—	—	—	—	1 Michelin star	1 Michelin star
La Trompette	British	Hounslow	1 Michelin star	1 Michelin star	1 Michelin star	1 Michelin star	1 Michelin star	1 Michelin star	1 Michelin star	1 Michelin star	1 Michelin star	1 Michelin star
Launceston Place	British	Kensington and Chelsea	—	—	—	1 Michelin star	1 Michelin star	1 Michelin star	1 Michelin star	Closed		
Le Gavroche	French	Westminster	2 Michelin stars	2 Michelin stars	2 Michelin stars	2 Michelin stars	2 Michelin stars	2 Michelin stars	2 Michelin stars	2 Michelin stars	2 Michelin stars	2 Michelin stars
Leroy	British	Hackney	—	—	—	—	—	—	—	—	—	1 Michelin star
Lima Fitzrovia	Peruvian	Westminster	—	—	—	—	1 Michelin star	1 Michelin star	1 Michelin star	1 Michelin star	1 Michelin star	—
Locanda Locatelli	Italian	Westminster	1 Michelin star	1 Michelin star	1 Michelin star	1 Michelin star	1 Michelin star	1 Michelin star	1 Michelin star	1 Michelin star	1 Michelin star	1 Michelin star
Lyle's	British	Hackney	—	—	—	—	—	—	1 Michelin star	1 Michelin star	1 Michelin star	1 Michelin star
Marcus	British	Westminster	2 Michelin stars	2 Michelin stars	2 Michelin stars	2 Michelin stars	2 Michelin stars	2 Michelin stars	2 Michelin stars	2 Michelin stars	2 Michelin stars	1 Michelin star
Maze	Pan-Asian	Westminster	1 Michelin star	1 Michelin star	1 Michelin star	1 Michelin star	1 Michelin star	1 Michelin star	—	—	—	Closed
Medlar	French	Kensington and Chelsea	—	—	—	1 Michelin star	1 Michelin star	—	—	—	—	—
Murano	Italian	Westminster	1 Michelin star	1 Michelin star	1 Michelin star	1 Michelin star	1 Michelin star	1 Michelin star	1 Michelin star	1 Michelin star	1 Michelin star	1 Michelin star
Nahm	Thai	Westminster	1 Michelin star	—	Closed							
Nobu at the Metropolitan	Japanese	Westminster	1 Michelin star	1 Michelin star	1 Michelin star	1 Michelin star	1 Michelin star	—	—	—	—	—
Nobu Berkeley Square	Japanese	Westminster	1 Michelin star	1 Michelin star	1 Michelin star	1 Michelin star	1 Michelin star	—	—	—	—	Closed
North Road	Modern	Islington	—	—	1 Michelin star	1 Michelin star	Closed					
Outlaw's at the Capital	British	Kensington and Chelsea	—	—	—	—	1 Michelin star	1 Michelin star	1 Michelin star	1 Michelin star	1 Michelin star	Closed
Petersham Nurseries Café	Modern	Richmond	—	1 Michelin star	1 Michelin star	1 Michelin star	Closed					
Pétrus	French	Westminster	—	1 Michelin star	1 Michelin star	1 Michelin star	1 Michelin star	1 Michelin star	1 Michelin star	1 Michelin star	1 Michelin star	1 Michelin star
Pidgin	Pan-Asian	Hackney	—	—	—	—	—	—	—	1 Michelin star	—	—
Pied à Terre	French	Camden	2 Michelin stars	2 Michelin stars	1 Michelin star	1 Michelin star	1 Michelin star	1 Michelin star	1 Michelin star	1 Michelin star	1 Michelin star	1 Michelin star
Pollen Street Social	British	Westminster	—	—	1 Michelin star	1 Michelin star	1 Michelin star	1 Michelin star	1 Michelin star	1 Michelin star	1 Michelin star	1 Michelin star
Portland	Modern	Westminster	—	—	—	—	—	—	1 Michelin star	1 Michelin star	1 Michelin star	1 Michelin star
Quilon Restaurant	Indian	Westminster	1 Michelin star	1 Michelin star	1 Michelin star	1 Michelin star	1 Michelin star	1 Michelin star	1 Michelin star	1 Michelin star	1 Michelin star	1 Michelin star
Rasoi	Indian	Kensington and Chelsea	1 Michelin star	1 Michelin star	1 Michelin star	1 Michelin star	1 Michelin star	1 Michelin star	—	—	Closed	
Restaurant Gordon Ramsay	French	Kensington and Chelsea	3 Michelin stars	3 Michelin stars	3 Michelin stars	3 Michelin stars	3 Michelin stars	3 Michelin stars	3 Michelin stars	3 Michelin stars	3 Michelin stars	3 Michelin stars
Rhodes Twenty Four	British	City of London	1 Michelin star	1 Michelin star	1 Michelin star	1 Michelin star	—	Closed				
River Café	Italian	Hammersmith and Fulham	1 Michelin star	1 Michelin star	1 Michelin star	1 Michelin star	1 Michelin star	1 Michelin star	1 Michelin star	1 Michelin star	1 Michelin star	1 Michelin star
Ristorante Semplice	Italian	Westminster	1 Michelin star	1 Michelin star	1 Michelin star	1 Michelin star	Closed					
Ritz Restaurant	British	Westminster	—	—	—	—	—	—	—	1 Michelin star	1 Michelin star	1 Michelin star
Roganic	British	Westminster	—	—	—	—	—	—	—	—	—	1 Michelin star
Roussillon	French	Westminster	1 Michelin star	—	Closed							
Sabor	Spanish	Westminster	—	—	—	—	—	—	—	—	—	1 Michelin star
Seven Park Place	British	Westminster	—	1 Michelin star	1 Michelin star	1 Michelin star	1 Michelin star	1 Michelin star	1 Michelin star	1 Michelin star	1 Michelin star	1 Michelin star
Sketch	French	Westminster	1 Michelin star	1 Michelin star	1 Michelin star	2 Michelin stars	2 Michelin stars	2 Michelin stars	2 Michelin stars	2 Michelin stars	2 Michelin stars	2 Michelin stars
Social Eating House	Contemporary	Westminster	—	—	—	—	1 Michelin star	1 Michelin star	1 Michelin star	1 Michelin star	1 Michelin star	1 Michelin star
St. JOHN	British	Islington	1 Michelin star	1 Michelin star	1 Michelin star	1 Michelin star	1 Michelin star	1 Michelin star	1 Michelin star	1 Michelin star	1 Michelin star	1 Michelin star
St. JOHN Hotel	British	Westminster	—	—	—	1 Michelin star	1 Michelin star	Closed				
Story	Modern	Southwark	—	—	—	—	1 Michelin star	1 Michelin star	1 Michelin star	1 Michelin star	1 Michelin star	1 Michelin star
Tamarind (Note: Restaurant lost its star in 2020)	Indian	Westminster	1 Michelin star	1 Michelin star	1 Michelin star	1 Michelin star	1 Michelin star	1 Michelin star	1 Michelin star	1 Michelin star	1 Michelin star	—
Texture	Nordic	Westminster	1 Michelin star	1 Michelin star	1 Michelin star	1 Michelin star	1 Michelin star	1 Michelin star	1 Michelin star	1 Michelin star	1 Michelin star	1 Michelin star
The Araki (Note: Restaurant lost its stars in 2020)	Japanese	Westminster	—	—	—	—	—	—	2 Michelin stars	2 Michelin stars	3 Michelin stars	3 Michelin stars
The Clove Club	British	Hackney	—	—	—	—	—	1 Michelin star	1 Michelin star	1 Michelin star	1 Michelin star	1 Michelin star
The Ledbury	Modern	Kensington and Chelsea	2 Michelin stars	2 Michelin stars	2 Michelin stars	2 Michelin stars	2 Michelin stars	2 Michelin stars	2 Michelin stars	2 Michelin stars	2 Michelin stars	2 Michelin stars
The Glasshouse	French	Richmond	1 Michelin star	1 Michelin star	1 Michelin star	1 Michelin star	1 Michelin star	1 Michelin star	1 Michelin star	1 Michelin star	1 Michelin star	1 Michelin star
The Greenhouse	French	Westminster	1 Michelin star	1 Michelin star	1 Michelin star	1 Michelin star	2 Michelin stars	2 Michelin stars	2 Michelin stars	2 Michelin stars	2 Michelin stars	2 Michelin stars
The Harwood Arms	British	Hammersmith and Fulham	1 Michelin star	1 Michelin star	1 Michelin star	1 Michelin star	1 Michelin star	1 Michelin star	1 Michelin star	1 Michelin star	1 Michelin star	1 Michelin star
The Ninth	Mediterranean	Camden	—	—	—	—	—	—	—	1 Michelin star	1 Michelin star	1 Michelin star
The Square	French	Westminster	2 Michelin stars	2 Michelin stars	2 Michelin stars	2 Michelin stars	2 Michelin stars	2 Michelin stars	2 Michelin stars	—	1 Michelin star	1 Michelin star
Tom Aikens Restaurant	French	Kensington and Chelsea	1 Michelin star	1 Michelin star	Closed	1 Michelin star	1 Michelin star	—	—	—	—	Closed
Trinity	British	Lambeth	—	—	—	—	—	—	—	1 Michelin star	1 Michelin star	1 Michelin star
Trishna	Indian	Westminster	—	—	—	1 Michelin star	1 Michelin star	1 Michelin star	1 Michelin star	1 Michelin star	1 Michelin star	1 Michelin star
Umu	Japanese	Westminster	1 Michelin star	1 Michelin star	1 Michelin star	1 Michelin star	1 Michelin star	1 Michelin star	2 Michelin stars	2 Michelin stars	2 Michelin stars	2 Michelin stars
Veeraswamy	Indian	Westminster	—	—	—	—	—	—	—	1 Michelin star	1 Michelin star	1 Michelin star
Viajante	Modern	Tower Hamlets	—	1 Michelin star	1 Michelin star	1 Michelin star	1 Michelin star	Closed				
Vineet Bhatia	Indian	Westminster	—	—	—	—	—	—	—	—	1 Michelin star	Closed
W1	French	Westminster	1 Michelin star	1 Michelin star	1 Michelin star	1 Michelin star	Closed					
Wild Honey	British	Westminster	1 Michelin star	1 Michelin star	1 Michelin star	1 Michelin star	1 Michelin star	1 Michelin star	1 Michelin star	—	—	Closed
Yauatcha Soho (Note: Restaurant lost its star in 2020)	Chinese	Westminster	1 Michelin star	1 Michelin star	1 Michelin star	1 Michelin star	1 Michelin star	1 Michelin star	1 Michelin star	1 Michelin star	1 Michelin star	1 Michelin star
Zafferano	Italian	Westminster	1 Michelin star	1 Michelin star	1 Michelin star	—	—	—	—	—	—	—
Reference												

== 2000–2009 lists ==
Key
1 Michelin star	One Michelin star
2 Michelin stars	Two Michelin stars
3 Michelin stars	Three Michelin stars
—	The restaurant did not receive a star that year
Closed	The restaurant is no longer open

Michelin-starred restaurants
Name	Cuisine	Location	2008	2009
1 Lombard Street	British	City of London	1 Michelin star	—
Ambassade de L’ile (Note: Restaurant closed in 2010)	French	Kensington and Chelsea	—	1 Michelin star
Alain Ducasse at The Dorchester	French	Westminster	—	2 Michelin stars
Amaya	Indian	Westminster	1 Michelin star	1 Michelin star
Arbutus	British	Westminster	1 Michelin star	1 Michelin star
Assaggi (Note: Restaurant lost its Michelin star in 2010 but remains open)	Italian	Westminster	1 Michelin star	1 Michelin star
Aubergine (Note: Restaurant closed in 2010)	French	Kensington and Chelsea	1 Michelin star	1 Michelin star
Benares	Indian	Westminster	1 Michelin star	1 Michelin star
Chapter One	Modern	Bromley	—	1 Michelin star
Chez Bruce	French	Wandsworth	1 Michelin star	1 Michelin star
Club Gascon	French	City of London	1 Michelin star	1 Michelin star
Foliage (Note: Restaurant closed in 2009)	French	Westminster	1 Michelin star	1 Michelin star
Gordon Ramsay at Claridge's (Note: Restaurant lost its star in 2010 and closed in 2013)	French	Westminster	1 Michelin star	1 Michelin star
Hakkasan Hanway Place	Chinese	Camden	1 Michelin star	1 Michelin star
Hélène Darroze at The Connaught	Modern	Westminster	—	1 Michelin star
Hibiscus	French	Westminster	1 Michelin star	2 Michelin stars
Kai Mayfair	Chinese	Westminster	—	1 Michelin star
L'Atelier De Joel Robuchon	French	Westminster	1 Michelin star	2 Michelin stars
L'Autre Pied	French	Westminster	—	1 Michelin star
L'Escargot	French	Westminster	1 Michelin star	—
La Noisette	French	Kensington and Chelsea	1 Michelin star	Closed
La Trompette	British	Hounslow	1 Michelin star	1 Michelin star
Le Gavroche	French	Westminster	2 Michelin stars	2 Michelin stars
Locanda Locatelli	Italian	Westminster	1 Michelin star	1 Michelin star
Marcus (Note: Was named Marcus Wareing at the Berkeley until 2009)	British	Westminster	2 Michelin stars	2 Michelin stars
Maze	Pan-Asian	Westminster	1 Michelin star	1 Michelin star
Mirabelle	French	Westminster	1 Michelin star	Closed
Murano	Italian	Westminster	—	1 Michelin star
Nahm	Thai	Westminster	1 Michelin star	1 Michelin star
Nobu at the Metropolitan	Japanese	Westminster	1 Michelin star	1 Michelin star
Nobu Berkeley Square	Japanese	Westminster	1 Michelin star	1 Michelin star
Pied à Terre	French	Camden	2 Michelin stars	2 Michelin stars
Quilon Restaurant	Indian	Westminster	1 Michelin star	1 Michelin star
Rasoi	Indian	Kensington and Chelsea	1 Michelin star	1 Michelin star
Restaurant Gordon Ramsay	French	Kensington and Chelsea	3 Michelin stars	3 Michelin stars
Rhodes Twenty Four	British	City of London	1 Michelin star	1 Michelin star
Richard Corrigan at Lindsay House (Note: Restaurant closed in 2009)	British	Westminster	1 Michelin star	1 Michelin star
Ristorante Semplice	Italian	Westminster	—	1 Michelin star
Roussillon	French	Westminster	1 Michelin star	1 Michelin star
Sketch	French	Westminster	1 Michelin star	1 Michelin star
St. JOHN	British	Islington	—	1 Michelin star
Tamarind	Indian	Westminster	1 Michelin star	—
The Capital Restaurant	British	Kensington and Chelsea	2 Michelin stars	2 Michelin stars
The Glasshouse	French	Richmond	1 Michelin star	1 Michelin star
The Greenhouse	French	Westminster	1 Michelin star	1 Michelin star
The Ledbury	Modern	Kensington and Chelsea	1 Michelin star	1 Michelin star
River Café	Italian	Hammersmith and Fulham	1 Michelin star	1 Michelin star
The Square	French	Westminster	2 Michelin stars	2 Michelin stars
Tom Aikens Restaurant	French	Kensington and Chelsea	1 Michelin star	1 Michelin star
Umu	Japanese	Westminster	1 Michelin star	1 Michelin star
W1 (Note: Was named Rhodes W1 until 2009)	French	Westminster	1 Michelin star	1 Michelin star
Wild Honey	British	Westminster	1 Michelin star	1 Michelin star
Yauatcha Soho (Note: Restaurant lost its star in 2020)	Chinese	Westminster	1 Michelin star	1 Michelin star
Zafferano	Italian	Westminster	1 Michelin star	1 Michelin star
Reference				

== See also ==
- List of Michelin 3-star restaurants in the United Kingdom
- List of Michelin-starred restaurants in England
- List of Michelin-starred restaurants in Ireland
- List of Michelin-starred restaurants in Scotland
- List of Michelin-starred restaurants in Wales
- Lists of restaurants
