= Angler =

Angler may refer to:

- A fisherman who uses the fishing technique of angling
- Angler (video game)
- Angler (San Francisco restaurant), a seafood restaurant in San Francisco, California
- Angler (London restaurant), a Michelin-starred seafood restaurant in London
- The angler, Lophius piscatorius, a monkfish
- More generally, any anglerfish in the order Lophiiformes
- Angler: The Cheney Vice Presidency, a book written by Barton Gellman in 2008 about Vice President Dick Cheney, whose Secret Service codename was "Angler"
- The Huawei Nexus 6P, codename angler
