= Aulis =

Aulis may refer to:

- Aulis (given name)
- Aulis (ancient Greece), an ancient Greek town in Boeotia, traditionally the port from which the Greek army set sail for the Trojan War
- Aulis (beetle), a genus of ladybird beetle
- Aulis (mythology), a daughter of King Ogyges
- Aulis (restaurant), in London
- Avlida, a modern Greek town, traditionally identified with ancient Aulis

== See also ==
- Auli (disambiguation)
