= Taste Festivals =

Food festival company

Taste Festivals is a company which runs a series of food festivals around the world. As of 2012, these have taken place in fifteen cities. The events typically have the prefix "Taste of", although the company also runs The World Restaurant Awards. The events are typically attended by restaurants who operate mini-kitchens, these include Michelin starred restaurants.

== Description ==
The events run by Taste Festivals feature mini-kitchens from different restaurants, along with live demonstrations from chefs. The restaurants featured have included Michelin starred establishments such as Rhodes 24 and Le Gavroche at Taste of London. The Best in Taste award is given out by each festival to the restaurant who serves the best dish at each event.

== History ==
Taste Festivals launched in 2004 with the first Taste of London, which took place at Somerset House. The London event was moved to Regent's Park in 2005, where it has remained since. The show was named Best Consumer Show at the 2012 Exhibition News Awards. A second London-based event runs later in the year, entitled the festive edition of Taste of London. It runs on similar principles to the main Taste of London event, with a greater focus on festive shopping alongside restaurants and live demonstrations. As of 2016, the festive edition of Taste of London is held at Tobacco Docks, London.

Taste of Edinburgh was first run in 2007, initially at The Meadows, but after two years moved to Inverleith Park. In 2012, the festival was called off at late notice following high levels of rainfall in the days prior to the event making the site unsafe for the expected number of visitors. Initially the plans were to continue with the event despite the weather. As of 2012, there have been Taste festivals held in fifteen cities around the world, the restaurants at the 2012 Taste of London held a combined 11 Michelin stars.

The events were expanded to Africa in 2006 with Taste of Joburg, and expanded in 2008 to add a second South African event with Taste of Cape Town,

In February 2013 Taste Festivals Ltd was acquired by IMG Arts & Entertainment, which is part of IMG Worldwide, for £4.97m from Brand Events.

Hong Kong was added to the list of Taste Festivals in 2016. The festivals have been held at the Central Harbourfront, and outdoor space with the iconic city skyline as the backdrop. In 2018, the Taste of Hong Kong festival welcomed approximately 24,000 foodie enthusiasts over the 4 days and continues to grow in popularity.

On November 3, 2025 the global events and experiences company MARI announced the acquisition of IMG’s Arts & Entertainment and Action Sports events portfolios. The global Taste Festivals culinary series is therefore now part of the MARI Group.

=== The Big Feastival ===
Taste Festivals began running the Jamie Oliver backed Big Feastival in 2011, a combination event featuring both restaurants and musical artists. The initial plan was to host the event in Victoria Park during 2012 to coincide with the 2012 Summer Olympics, however due to branding restrictions this plan was cancelled. The event instead was arranged to take place at the farm of musician Alex James in Oxfordshire, who had previously hosted a similar festival in 2011 which resulted in the event's organisers going out of business due to the losses involved. In 2013, The Big Feastival was acquired by IMG alongside Taste Festivals.

== List of Taste Festivals ==
Australia

- Taste of Sydney
- Taste of Melbourne

Ireland

- Taste of Dublin
- Taste of Dublin: Festive Edition

Europe

- Taste of Amsterdam
- Taste of Athens
- Taste of Milano
- Taste of Paris
- Taste of Roma

United Kingdom

- Taste of London
- Taste of London: Festive Edition

Middle East
- Taste of Dubai
- Taste of Abu Dhabi
Elsewhere

- Taste of Auckland
- Taste of Hong Kong
- Taste of Moscow
- Taste of Sao Paulo
