= Five Fields (restaurant) =

Restaurant in London, United Kingdom

- Interactive map of Five Fields

Restaurant information
- Established: May 2013
- Closed: February 28, 2025
- Owner: Taylor Bonnyman
- Manager: Matthew Widdowson
- Head chef: Marguerite Keogh
- Rating: Michelin star AA Rosettes
- Location: 8-9 Blacklands Terrace, Chelsea, London, SW3 2SP, United Kingdom
- Coordinates: 51°29′30.1″N 0°9′40.5″W
- Website: fivefieldsrestaurant.com

Five Fields was a Michelin-starred restaurant in London, United Kingdom.

== See also ==
- List of Michelin-starred restaurants in Greater London
