= Caractère (restaurant) =

French restaurant in London, England

- Interactive map of Caractère

Restaurant information
- Established: 2018
- Food type: French
- Rating: 1 Michelin star
- Location: 209 Westbourne Park Road, London, United Kingdom
- Coordinates: 51.5178°N 0.2008°W

Caractère is a Michelin-starred French restaurant in the Notting Hill neighbourhood of London, United Kingdom.

The restaurant was opened in 2018 by chefs Emily Roux and Diego Ferrari who had formerly served as head chef at Le Gavroche. It received positive reviews in The Times and The Guardian, although Grace Dent writing in the latter was critical of the service. The restaurant first earned a Michelin-star in 2025.

== See also ==
- List of Michelin-starred restaurants in Greater London
