= Sollip =

Restaurant in London, United Kingdom

- Interactive map of Sollip

Restaurant information
- Food type: Korean
- Rating: 1 Michelin star
- Location: 8 Melior Street, Southwark, London, United Kingdom
- Coordinates: 51°30′09.5″N 0°05′06.4″W
- Website: sollip.co.uk

Sollip is a Michelin-starred restaurant in London, United Kingdom.

== See also ==
- List of Michelin-starred restaurants in Greater London
