= Davies and Brook =

Defunct restaurant in Greater London, United Kingdom

Restaurant information
- Location: United Kingdom

Davies and Brook was a Michelin-starred restaurant in Westminster, Greater London.

== See also ==
- List of Michelin-starred restaurants in Greater London
