= Alex Dilling at Hotel Café Royal =

French restaurant in London, England

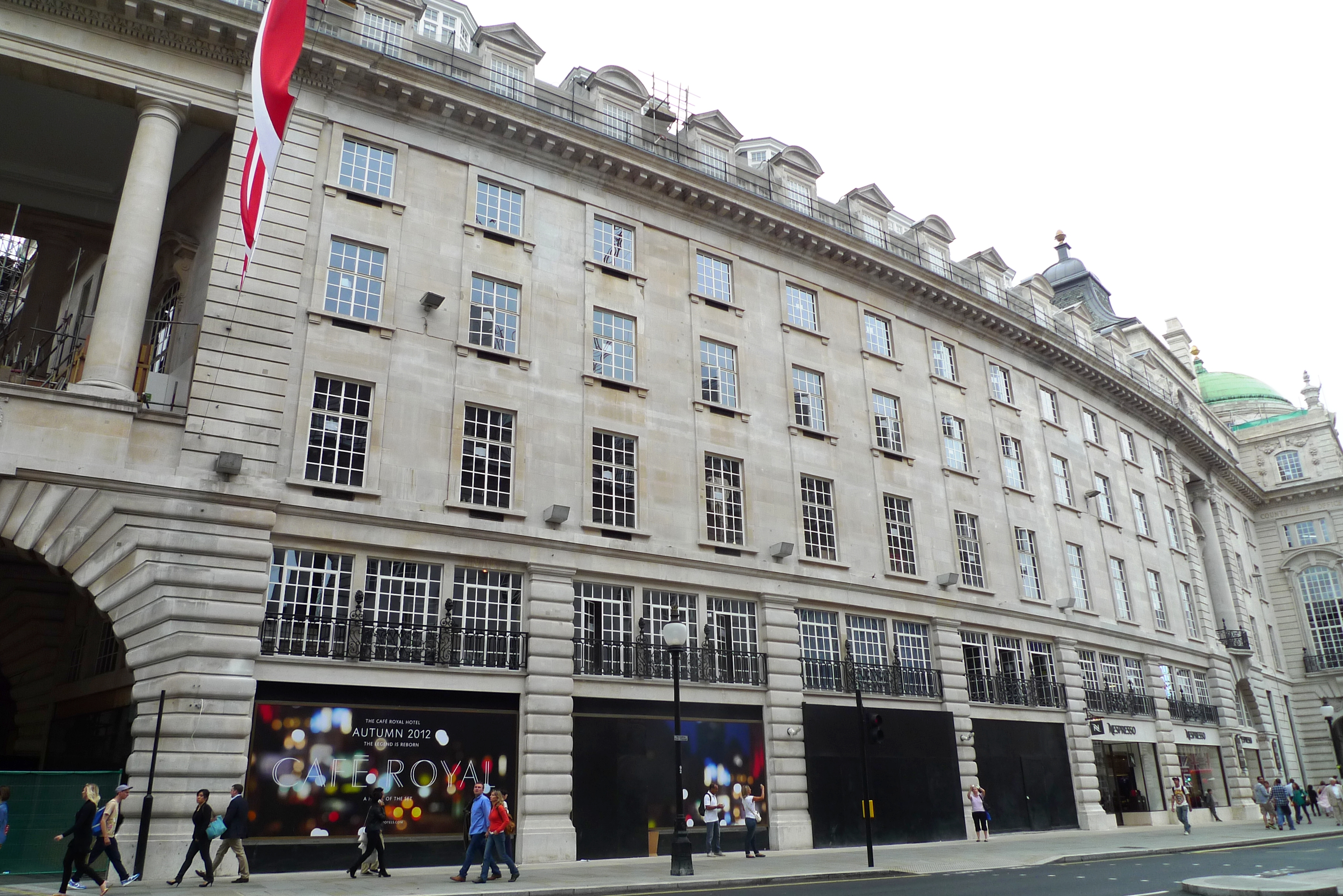
- Exterior of the Hotel Café Royal
- Interactive map of Alex Dilling at Hotel Café Royal

Restaurant information
- Established: 2022
- Chef: Alex Dilling
- Food type: French
- Rating: 2 Michelin stars
- Location: 68 Regent St., London, United Kingdom
- Coordinates: 51.5101°N 0.1359°W

Alex Dilling at Hotel Café Royal is a Michelin-starred French restaurant in London, United Kingdom.

The restaurant is attached to the Hotel Café Royal on Regent Street. It was first awarded two Michelin-stars in 2023 within 6 months of its opening.

In 2023, the restaurant began operation of a "minimum spend" policy which was seen as controversial due to increasing the price significantly for solo diners. The move as made due to high demand for space and reservations.

== See also ==
- List of Michelin-starred restaurants in Greater London
