= Benares (restaurant) =

Indian restaurant in London, United Kingdom

Benares Restaurant & Bar
- Interactive map of Benares Restaurant & Bar

Restaurant information
- Manager: Mukesh Pandey
- Head chef: Sameer Taneja
- Pastry chef: Elroy Pereira
- Food type: Modern Indian / Contemporary Indian fine dining
- Dress code: Smart casual
- Rating: 1 Michelin star
- Location: 12a Berkeley Square, London, United Kingdom
- Coordinates: 51°30′35″N 0°08′42″W
- Website: benaresrestaurant.com

Benares is a Michelin-starred Indian restaurant in London, United Kingdom.

== See also ==
- List of Indian restaurants
- List of Michelin-starred restaurants in Greater London
