= Umu (restaurant) =

Japanese restaurant in London, United Kingdom

- Interactive map of Umu

Restaurant information
- Food type: Japanese

Umu is a Michelin-starred Japanese restaurant in London, United Kingdom.

== See also ==
- List of Japanese restaurants
- List of Michelin-starred restaurants in Greater London
