= List of British restaurants =

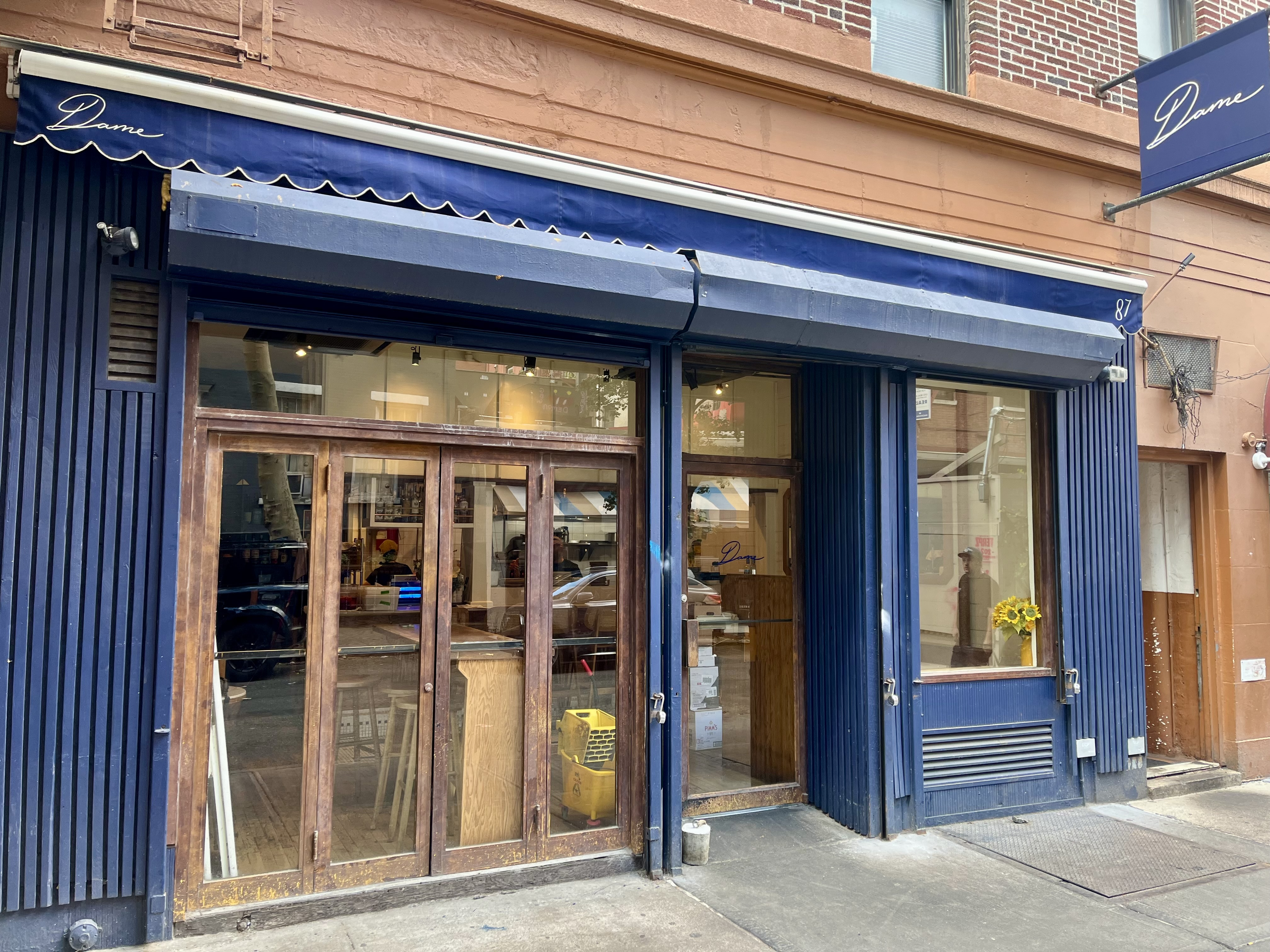
Dame, New York City

Following is a list of notable restaurants that have served British cuisine:

- Aulis, London, England
- Behind, London
- Brat, London
- Britannia Pub, Santa Monica
- Dame, New York City
- Dinner by Heston Blumenthal, London
- Dorian, London
- Fallow, London
- Forest Side, Grasmere, England
- Horse Brass Pub, Portland, Oregon
- Kitchen Table, London
- Leaky Roof Gastropub, Portland, Oregon
- Leroy, London
- Lord's, New York City
- Lyle's, London
- Ormer, London
- Quo Vadis, London
- Rhodes Twenty Four, London
