= Humo (restaurant) =

Restaurant in London, United Kingdom

- Interactive map of Humo

Restaurant information
- Location: London
- Coordinates: 51.5124°N 0.1433°W
- Website: humolondon.com

Humo was a Michelin-starred restaurant in London, United Kingdom. It was the debut solo restaurant project of chef Miller Prada. It featured a fully-open kitchen, with the team doing the plating directly on the counter. The cuisine blended Japanese with a number of other international influences.

In 2026, Humo lost its Michelin Star. The site was eventually was closed and relaunched as IGNI under chef Theo Clench.

== See also ==
- List of Michelin-starred restaurants in Greater London
