= Brat (restaurant) =

British restaurant in London, United Kingdom

- Interactive map of Brat

Restaurant information
- Food type: British
- Location: London

Brat is a Michelin-starred British restaurant in London, United Kingdom.

== See also ==
- List of British restaurants
- List of Michelin-starred restaurants in Greater London
