= 64 Goodge Street =

French restaurant in London, England

- Interactive map of 64 Goodge Street

Restaurant information
- Established: August 2023
- Chef: Stuart Andrew
- Food type: French
- Rating: 1 Michelin star
- Location: 64 Goodge Street, London, United Kingdom
- Coordinates: 51.5190°N 0.1369°W
- Website: 64goodgestreet.co.uk

64 Goodge Street is a Michelin-starred French restaurant in London, United Kingdom.

The restaurant was established in 2023 by Woodhead Restaurant Group as a sister restaurant to Portland and Clipstone in a former travel agent. Shortly after, it received positive reviews by Giles Coren and Grace Dent in The Times and The Guardian respectively. It was first awarded a Michelin-Star in 2025. Stuart Andrew serves as head chef.

== See also ==
- List of Michelin-starred restaurants in Greater London
