= Amaya (restaurant) =

Indian restaurant in Greater London, United Kingdom

Coordinates: 51.4991°N 0.1572°W

- Interactive map of Amaya

Restaurant information
- Food type: Indian
- Website: www.amaya.biz

Amaya is an Michelin-starred Indian restaurant in Greater London, United Kingdom.

== See also ==
- List of Indian restaurants
- List of Michelin starred restaurants in Greater London
