= Cornerstone (restaurant) =

Defunct restaurant in London, United Kingdom

Restaurant information
- Location: London

Cornerstone is a defunct restaurant in London, United Kingdom. It had received a Michelin star.

== See also ==
- List of Michelin-starred restaurants in Greater London
