= Auli =

Auli may refer to:

== People ==
=== Given name ===
- Auli Kiskola (born 1995), Finnish biathlete
- Auli Hakulinen (born 1941), Finnish professor
- Auli Mantila (born 1964), Finnish film director
- Jia Jia (Auli Puruburubuane), Taiwanese aboriginal singer and songwriter (born 1983)

=== Surname ===
- Jordi Condom Aulí, Spanish footballer
- Joan Auli (1796–1869), Spanish organist

== Places ==
- Auli, India
- Auli, Norway, served by Auli Station

== Other ==
- Auļi, Latvian folk/world music band
- An early form of the constructed language Interlingue

== See also ==
- Aulis (disambiguation)
