= Sola (restaurant) =

Restaurant in London, United Kingdom

- Interactive map of Sola

Restaurant information
- Established: 2019
- Chef: Victor Garvey
- Food type: California
- Rating: 1 Michelin star
- Location: 64 Dean Street, Soho, London, United Kingdom
- Coordinates: 51°30′47.5″N 0°07′56.4″W
- Website: solasoho.com

Sola is a Michelin-starred restaurant in London, United Kingdom. It serves California cuisine.

== See also ==
- List of Michelin-starred restaurants in Greater London
