= Ormer (restaurant) =

British restaurant in London, United Kingdom

Coordinates: 51.5064°N 0.1451°W

Ormer Mayfair
- Interactive map of Ormer Mayfair

Restaurant information
- Food type: British
- Location: 7-12 Half Moon Street, London, W1J 7BH, United Kingdom
- Website: www.flemings-mayfair.co.uk/fine-dining-london/ormer-mayfair-restaurant

Ormer Mayfair, also known as Ormer, is a Michelin-starred restaurant in Mayfair, London and is located within the Flemings Mayfair hotel. It was awarded a Michelin star in 2024.

== See also ==
- List of British restaurants
- List of Michelin-starred restaurants in Greater London
