= Dorian (restaurant) =

Restaurant in London, United Kingdom

- Interactive map of Dorian

Restaurant information
- Food type: British
- Location: 105, 107 Talbot Rd, London, W11 2AT, United Kingdom
- Coordinates: 51.5166°N 0.2006°W
- Website: www.dorianrestaurant.com

Dorian is a Michelin-starred restaurant in London, United Kingdom. It serves modern British cuisine.

== See also ==
- List of British restaurants
- List of Michelin-starred restaurants in Greater London
