= Trishna (restaurant) =

Indian restaurant in London, United Kingdom

- Interactive map of Trishna

Restaurant information
- Manager: Preeta Nair
- Chef: Sajeev Nair
- Food type: Indian
- Rating: 1 Michelin star
- Location: 15-17 Blandford Street, London, W1U 3DG, United Kingdom
- Coordinates: 51°31′06.0″N 0°09′10.6″W
- Website: trishnalondon.com

Trishna is a Michelin-starred Indian restaurant in London, United Kingdom.

== See also ==
- List of Indian restaurants
- List of Michelin-starred restaurants in Greater London
