= Flemings Mayfair =

Hotel in Mayfair, London

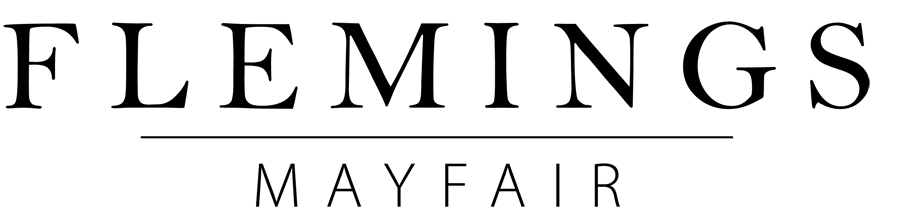

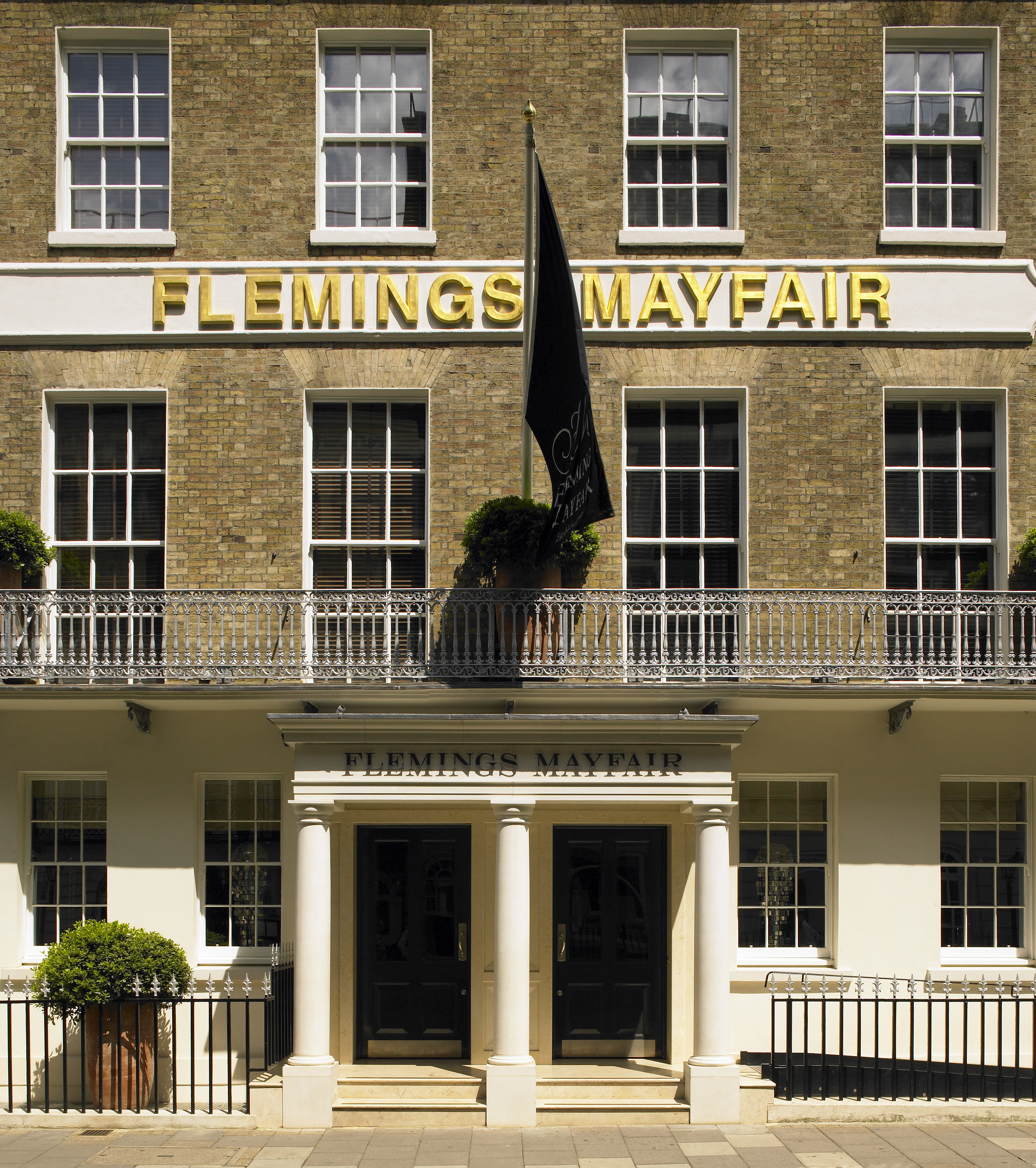

- Location within Central London

General information
- Location: 7-12 Half Moon Street, Mayfair, London, England
- Coordinates: 51°30′33″N 0°8′33″W
- Opened: 1851
- Owner: Gulhati family

Technical details
- Floor count: 4

Other information
- Number of rooms: 129
- Number of suites: 20
- Number of restaurants: 1
- Parking: Valet parking

Website
- flemings-mayfair.co.uk

Flemings Mayfair is a luxury hotel in Mayfair, London. The hotel is home to Manetta’s Bar and Ormer Mayfair, which was awarded a Michelin star in 2024.

== History ==
In 1851, Robert Fleming owned and ran a lodging house at number 10 Half Moon Street (believed to have originated in 1730). He started running what he called a 'private hotel' in 1855, at 9 and 10 Half Moon Street.

From 1855 to 1857, George Hudson, MP for Sunderland, owned apartments in the hotel. Hudson, famed as the 'Railway King', was a fraudster who had his downfall when he was discovered to have falsified railway company share prices. He stayed at Flemings when it was not possible for him to be arrested due to his position as MP.

In 1964, Agatha Christie published At Bertram's Hotel, about an up-market hotel which serves as the home base for a sophisticated criminal gang. Christie's official biography claims Flemings as the model for the eponymous hotel, based on correspondence between Christie and her literary agent Edmund Cork.

7, 8 and 9-12 Half Moon Street were originally Georgian townhouses and have been Grade II listed on the[National Heritage List for England since March 1980. The rear of the hotel at 39-42 Clarges Street was a separate hotel before the war, and is also Grade II listed.
