= Cycene =

Restaurant in London, United Kingdom

Restaurant information
- Location: London

Cycene is a Michelin-starred restaurant in London, United Kingdom.

== See also ==
- List of Michelin-starred restaurants in Greater London
