= Barrafina Dean Street =

Restaurant in Soho, London

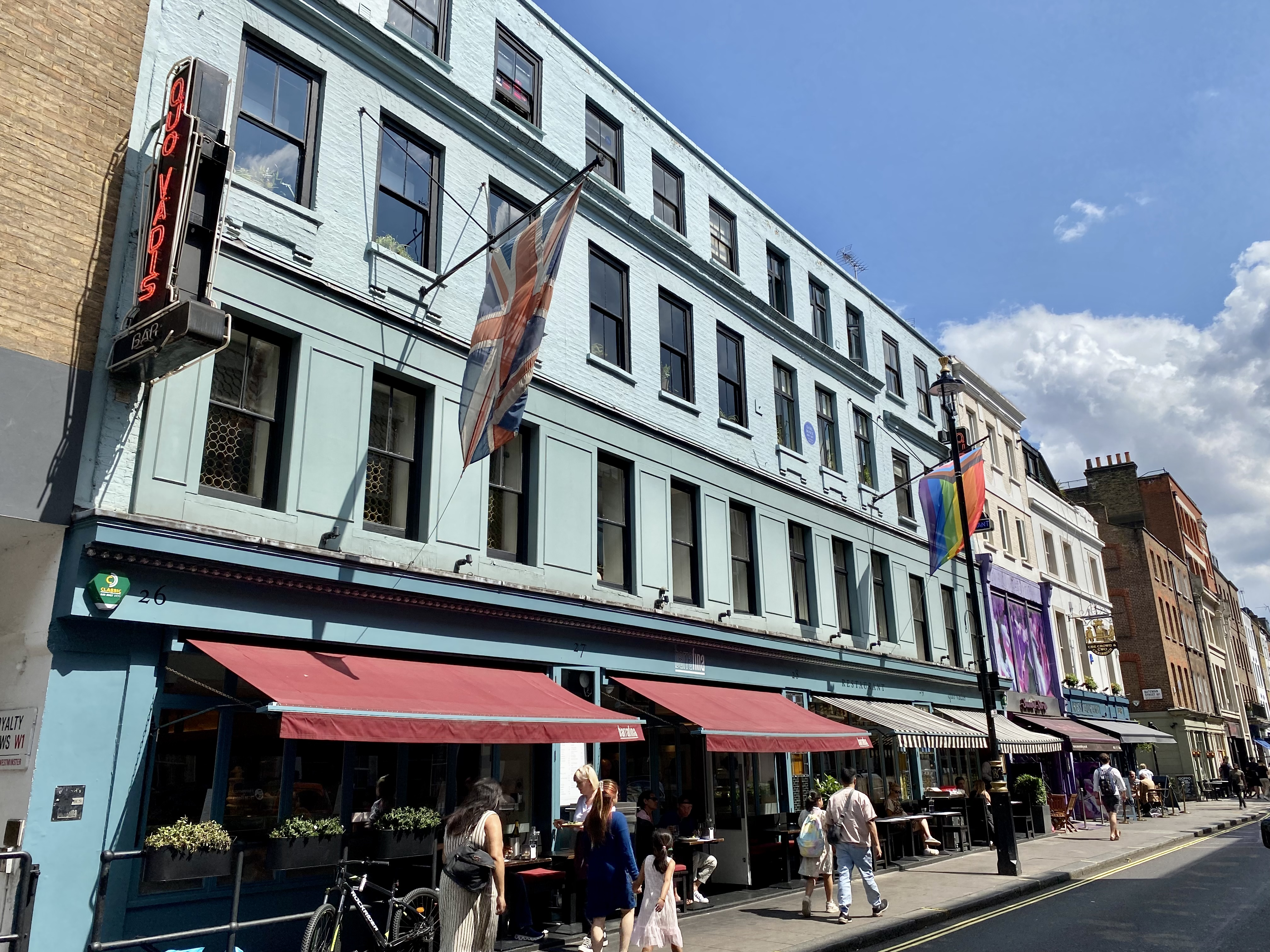
- Interactive map of Barrafina Dean Street

Restaurant information
- Food type: Tapas
- Location: 26-27 Dean Street, London, W1D 3LL, England

Barrafina Dean Street is a Spanish restaurant in the City of Westminster. It has received a Michelin star.

== See also ==
- List of Michelin-starred restaurants in Greater London
- List of Spanish restaurants
