= Ikoyi (restaurant) =

Restaurant in London, United Kingdom

- Interactive map of Ikoyi

Restaurant information
- Rating: (Michelin Guide)
- Location: 180 Strand, Strand, London, WC2R 1EA, United Kingdom
- Coordinates: 51°30′44.6″N 0°06′55.7″W
- Website: ikoyilondon.com

Ikoyi is a two time Michelin-starred West African inspired restaurant in London, United Kingdom. In 2024, it was named the 10th best restaurant in the UK at The National Restaurant Awards. The name is Yoruba and named after a place in Lagos, Nigeria, called Ikoyi.

== See also ==
- List of African restaurants
- List of Michelin-starred restaurants in Greater London
