= Behind (restaurant) =

Restaurant in London, United Kingdom

Restaurant information
- Location: London, United Kingdom

Behind is a Michelin-starred restaurant in London, United Kingdom. It serves modern British cuisine.

== See also ==
- List of British restaurants
- List of Michelin-starred restaurants in Greater London
