= Seven Park Place =

Defunct restaurant in Greater London, United Kingdom

- Interactive map of Seven Park Place

Restaurant information
- Established: September 2009
- Owner: Althoff Hotels
- Food type: Modern French-influenced British
- Rating: Michelin Guide (2011–2022); AA Rosettes
- Location: 7–8 Park Place, St James's, London, SW1A 1LS, United Kingdom
- Coordinates: 51.5059°N 0.1411°W
- Website: www.stjameshotelandclub.com/en/seven-park-place

Seven Park Place was a Michelin-starred restaurant in Greater London, United Kingdom.

== See also ==
- List of Michelin-starred restaurants in Greater London
