= Gymkhana (restaurant) =

Indian restaurant in London

- Interactive map of Gymkhana

Restaurant information
- Established: 2013
- Food type: North Indian
- Rating: London (Michelin Guide)
- Location: 42 Albemarle Street, Mayfair, London, United Kingdom
- Coordinates: 51°30′30.8″N 0°08′29.6″W
- Website: gymkhanarestaurants.com

Gymkhana (/'ʤɪmˈkɑːnə/) is a two-Michelin-star restaurant in Mayfair, London. Opened in 2013, the restaurant earned its first star one year later, followed by a second star in 2024. The name is taken from the Indian social and sports clubs of the same name. Known for its classic, largely North Indian cuisine, the restaurant was named National Restaurant of the Year 2014 and has since launched a retail brand, Gymkhana Fine Foods, and opened internationally.

== History ==
Jyotin, Karam and Sunaina Sethi founded JKS Restaurants with their first restaurant, Trishna, in 2008. Gymkhana, their second restaurant, opened five years later. The Times critic Giles Coren cited it the "best restaurant I have ever been to" in December 2013, giving Gymkhana his first 10/10 rating.

In 2014, Gymkhana won the title of National Restaurant of the Year at the National Restaurant Awards and gained its first Michelin-star that same year.

The restaurant was forced to close after a fire, from 6 June 2019 to 18 February 2020, with the space redesigned by Samuel Hosker.

In 2022, JKS Restaurants opened Gymkhana's first international site in the Middle East

Gymkhana Fine Foods, the restaurant's range of cooking sauces, marinades and chutneys, came to market exclusively with Whole Foods Market UK in October 2023.

The London restaurant celebrated its 10th anniversary in September 2023.

Gymkhana was awarded its second Michelin star in 2024, becoming the first two-Michelin-star Indian restaurant in London and one of only four Indian restaurants in the world to hold two Michelin stars.

In December 2025, Gymkhana opened its first US location at Aria on the Las Vegas Strip.

In September 2026, Gymkhana Dubai will open in DIFC.

== Food ==
Gymkhana serves classic Indian cuisine of largely Northern Indian origin. The menu was described by The Independent restaurant critic Lisa Markwell as being "exemplary of the fine line between comforting and imaginative". Nicholas Lander, Financial Times, wrote of co-founder Karam Sethi: "Sethi has created a restaurant that delivers highly labour intensive and flavourful dishes with style and wit".

Dishes include Tandoori Masala Lamb Chops, Kid Goat Methi Keema and Wild Muntjac Biryani.

== International ==
In 2022, Gymkhana opened its first international site in the Middle East. It opened its second in Riyadh in June 2023.

On 6 August 2025, it was announced by Priya Krishna of The New York Times that Gymkhana will open its first U.S location. Gymkhana Las Vegas opened December 2025 within ARIA Resort & Casino, an MGM Resorts International venue. In July 2026, JKS Restaurants announced the arrival of Gymkhana Dubai in DIFC, set to open in September 2026.

== Retail ==
Gymkhana Fine Foods launched into retail exclusively with Whole Foods Market UK in October 2023, and is now also listed at major retailers Ocado, Selfridges and Harrods. The business is backed by US venture capitalist, CAVU Consumer Partners. Four of the nine products in the range won stars at The Great Taste Awards 2024 from The Guild of Fine Food. Gymkhana Fine Foods launched in the US in February 2026.

== 42 Cocktail Lounge ==
In November 2023, Gymkhana opened its first cocktail lounge above the restaurant. The "maximalist" interiors have been shortlisted in the 2024 Restaurant & Bar Design Awards.

The cocktail lounge has been featured in British Vogue,. Bloomberg, the FT How To Spend It and Conde Nast Traveller. The drinks use Indian ingredients such as Banasura peppercorns and Chaprah chutney, made of weaver ants.

== Awards ==
- 2014: National Restaurant Awards – National Restaurant of the Year
- 2014-2023: Michelin Guide London – one star
- 2024-2025: Michelin Guide London – two stars
- 2018 SquareMeal Gold Awards

== See also ==
- List of Indian restaurants
- List of Michelin-starred restaurants in Greater London
