= Horse Brass Pub =

Pub in Portland, Oregon, U.S.

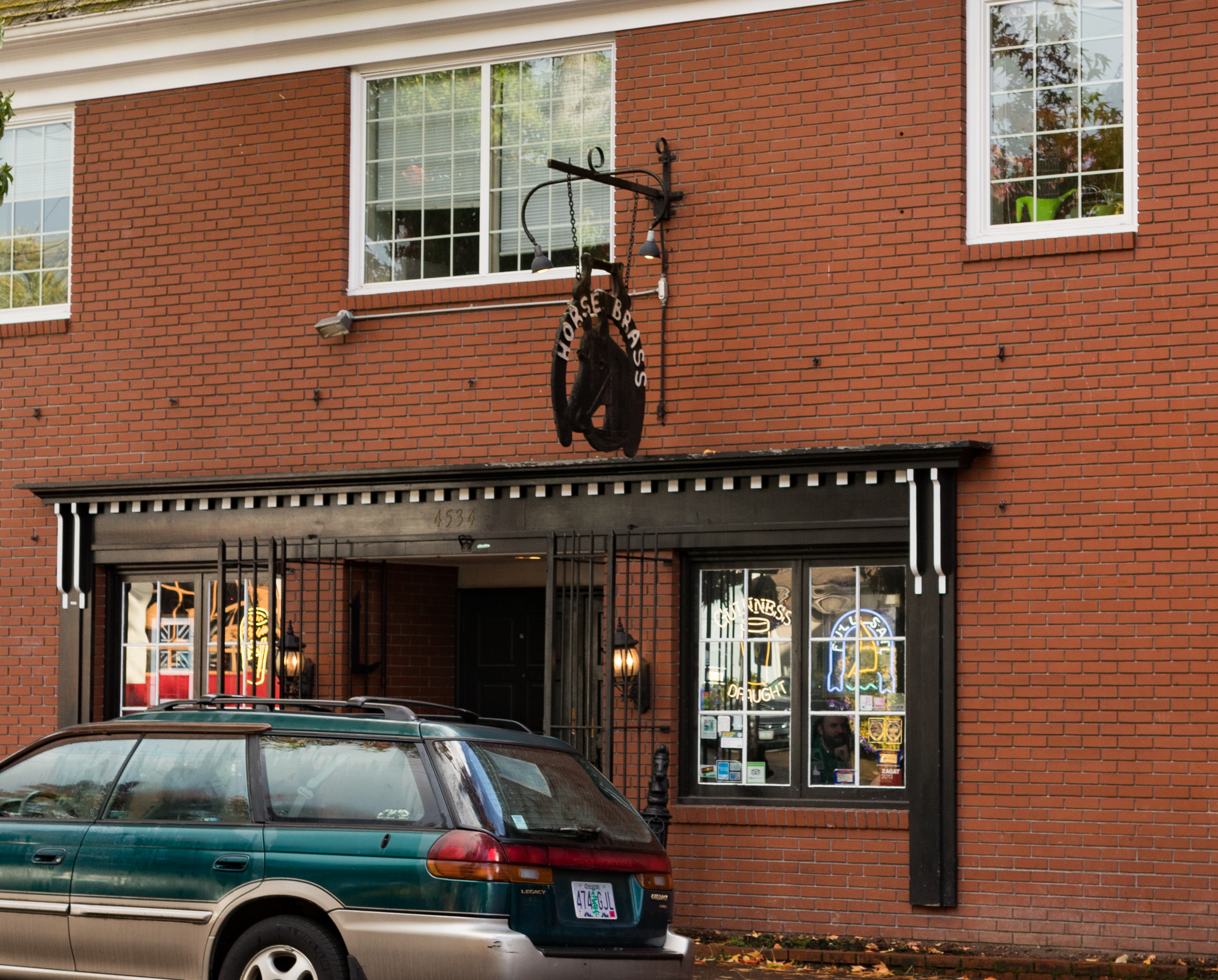
- The pub's exterior, October 2017
- Interactive map of Horse Brass Pub

Restaurant information
- Established: 1976
- Location: 4534 SE Belmont Street, Portland, Multnomah, Oregon, 97215, United States
- Coordinates: 45°30′59.0″N 122°36′55.8″W
- Website: horsebrass.com

Horse Brass Pub is a British-style pub in Portland, Oregon, in the United States. Established in 1976, the bar and restaurant serves British cuisine and has approximately 50 beers on tap.

In The Beer Geek Handbook (2016), Patrick Dawson called owner Don Younger "the godfather of 'American Beer Geeks'", who "helped blaze the path for good beer in America".

== Description ==
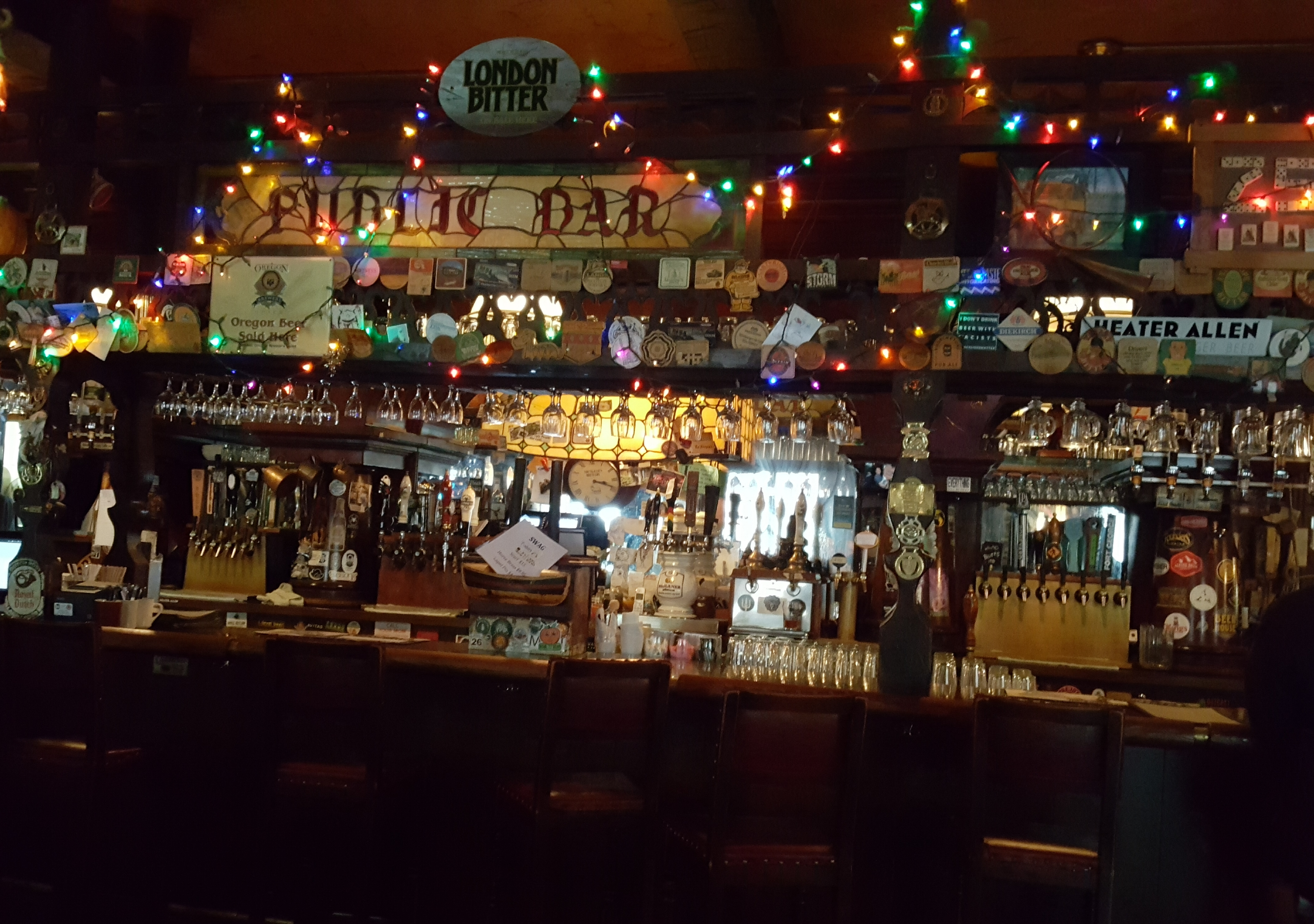
The bar's interior, 2021

Horse Brass Pub is a British-style pub on Belmont Street in southeast Portland's Sunnyside neighborhood. The pub has dark wood, exposed beams, and darts. It has approximately 50 beers on tap and is "especially popular with the late-night crowd". The menu has British cuisine such as bangers and mash, fish and chips, meat pies, sausage rolls, and Scotch eggs.

== History ==
Horse Brass Pub was established in 1976. The bar was owned by Don Younger.

Prior to Oregon's ban on indoor smoking, the pub was known for having a smoky atmosphere.

== Reception ==
Thrillist says Horse Brass Pub "has never not been a great place to knock back a few. It’s the best British pub outside of Britain, right down to the halibut fish and chips". The bar has been described as "venerable" and "a pre-eminent beer destination in a city full of brewpubs and beer bars". It has also been called "a beer-supping shrine run by the godfather of Portland's beer scene".

Melissa Stranger included Horse Brass Pub in Business Insider's 2015 list of the "best Irish pubs in 19 big cities around the US". David Greenwald included the pub in The Oregonian's 2017 list of 38 "kid-friendly" beer establishments in Portland. Men's Journal included Horse Brass Pub in a 2017 overview of "America's Founding Craft Beer Bars", or "beer bars that set the pace for the rest of the country". In 2022, Julia Silverman of Portland Monthly said Horse Brass Pub was "perhaps the most authentic of Portland’s British pubs". Alex Frane included the business in the magazine's 2025 list of the city's best bars.

In 2017, Willamette Week's Ezra Johnson-Greenough said "Portland's status as a beer mecca can be traced back to a grungy, smoky, dimly lit neighborhood British pub". Reporting on the bar's early history, in 2018 the newspaper's Parker Hall said Horse Brass Pub "would eventually become one of the most iconic beer bars in the United States". The bar placed second in the Best Beer Selection on Tap category of Willamette Week's annual "Best of Portland" readers' poll in 2020.

== See also ==
- List of British restaurants
