= Jamavar (restaurant) =

Indian restaurant in London, United Kingdom

- Interactive map of Jamavar

Restaurant information
- Food type: Indian

Jamavar is a Michelin-starred Indian restaurant in London, United Kingdom.

== See also ==
- List of Indian restaurants
- List of Michelin-starred restaurants in Greater London
