= Lyle's =

British restaurant in London, United Kingdom

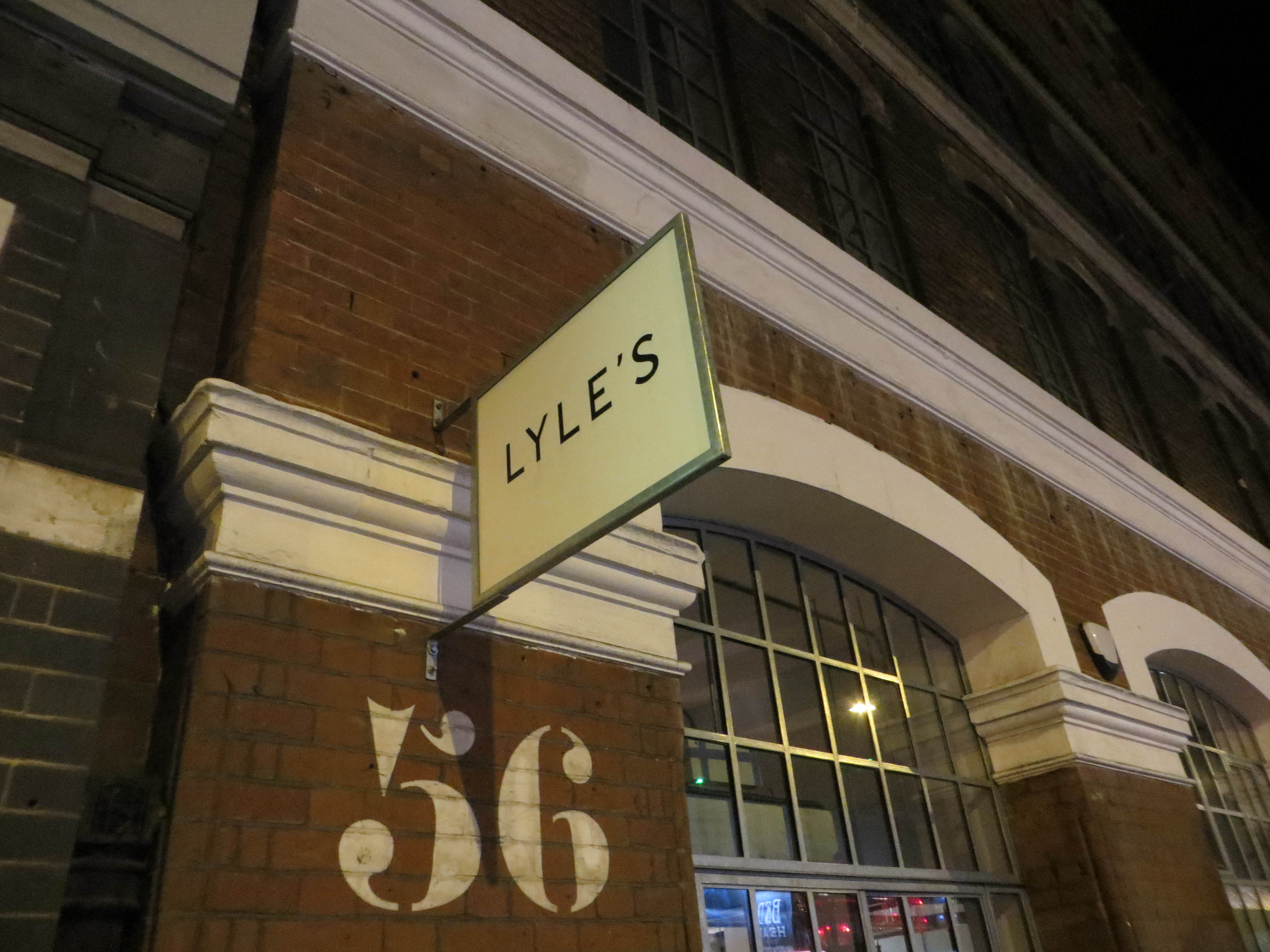
- Pictured in 2016
- Interactive map of Lyle's

Restaurant information
- Established: April 2014
- Closed: May 18, 2025
- Head chef: James Lowe
- Food type: British
- Rating: 1 Michelin star
- Location: Tea Building, 56 Shoreditch High Street, London, E1 6JJ
- Coordinates: 51.52374°N 0.07642°W

Lyle's was a Michelin-starred British restaurant in Shoreditch, London. It opened in April 2014 under chef James Lowe and closed in 2025.

== See also ==
- List of British restaurants
- List of Michelin-starred restaurants in Greater London
