= Da Terra =

Restaurant in London, United Kingdom

- Interactive map of Da Terra

Restaurant information
- Chef: Rafael Cagali
- Dress code: Comfortable
- Rating: 2 Michelin stars
- Location: 8 Patriot Square, Bethnal Green, London, E2 9NF, United Kingdom
- Coordinates: 51°31′49.5″N 0°03′21.9″W
- Website: daterra.co.uk

Da Terra is a Michelin-starred restaurant in London, United Kingdom.

== See also ==
- List of Michelin-starred restaurants in Greater London
