= Céleste (restaurant) =

Former French restaurant in London, England

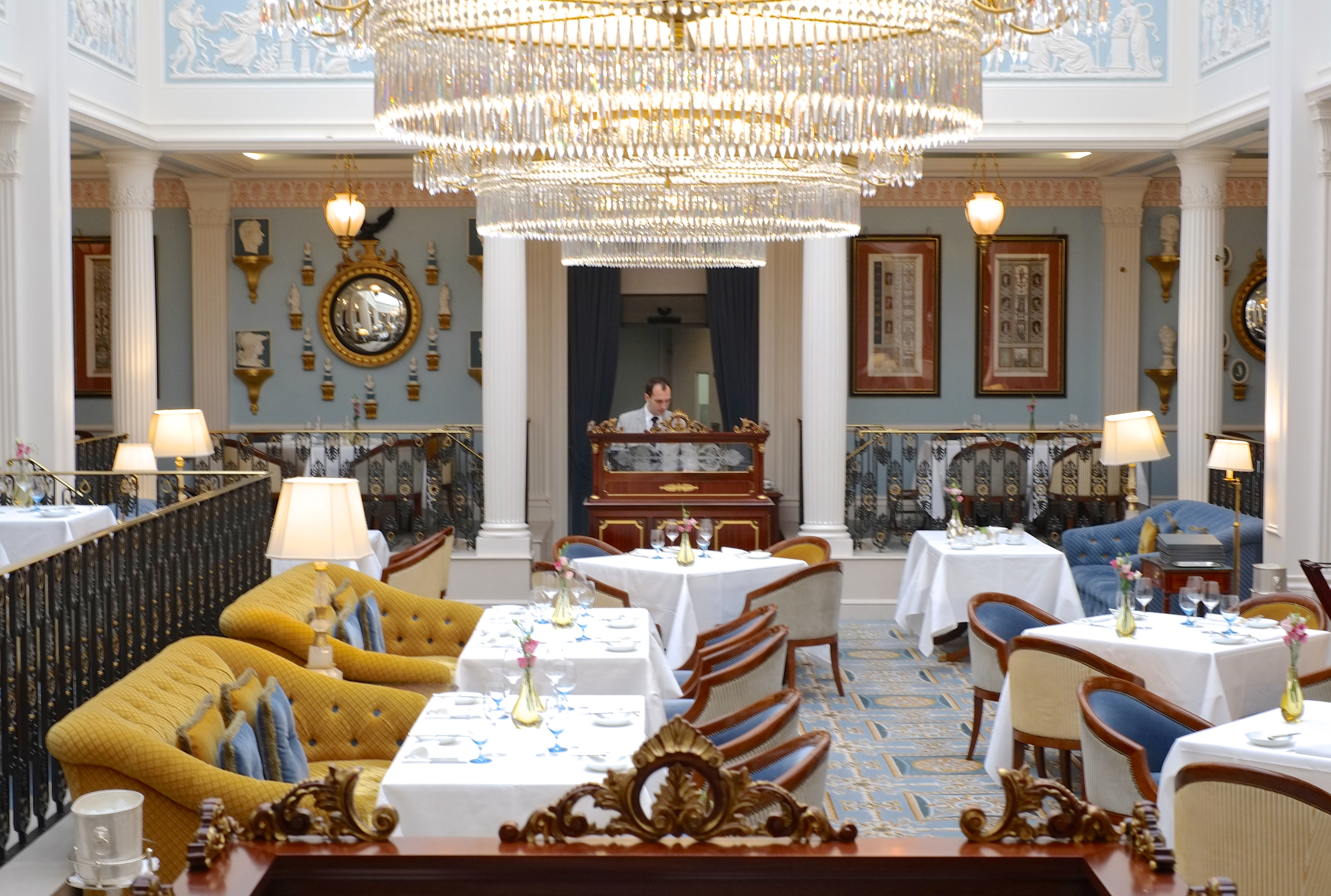
- Dining room of Céleste
- Interactive map of Céleste

Restaurant information
- Established: 2015
- Closed: 2022
- Food type: French
- Location: The Lanesborough, Hyde Park Corner, London, United Kingdom
- Coordinates: 51.5024°N 0.1524°W

Céleste was a Michelin-starred French restaurant in London, United Kingdom.

The restaurant was established in 2015 in the Lanesborough Hotel. It replaced Apsleys and was first awarded a Michelin-Star in 2017. It lost its Michelin-star in 2022 and closed the following year, later being replaced by the Lanesborough Grill.

== See also ==
- List of Michelin-starred restaurants in Greater London
