= Humble Chicken =

Japanese restaurant in London, United Kingdom

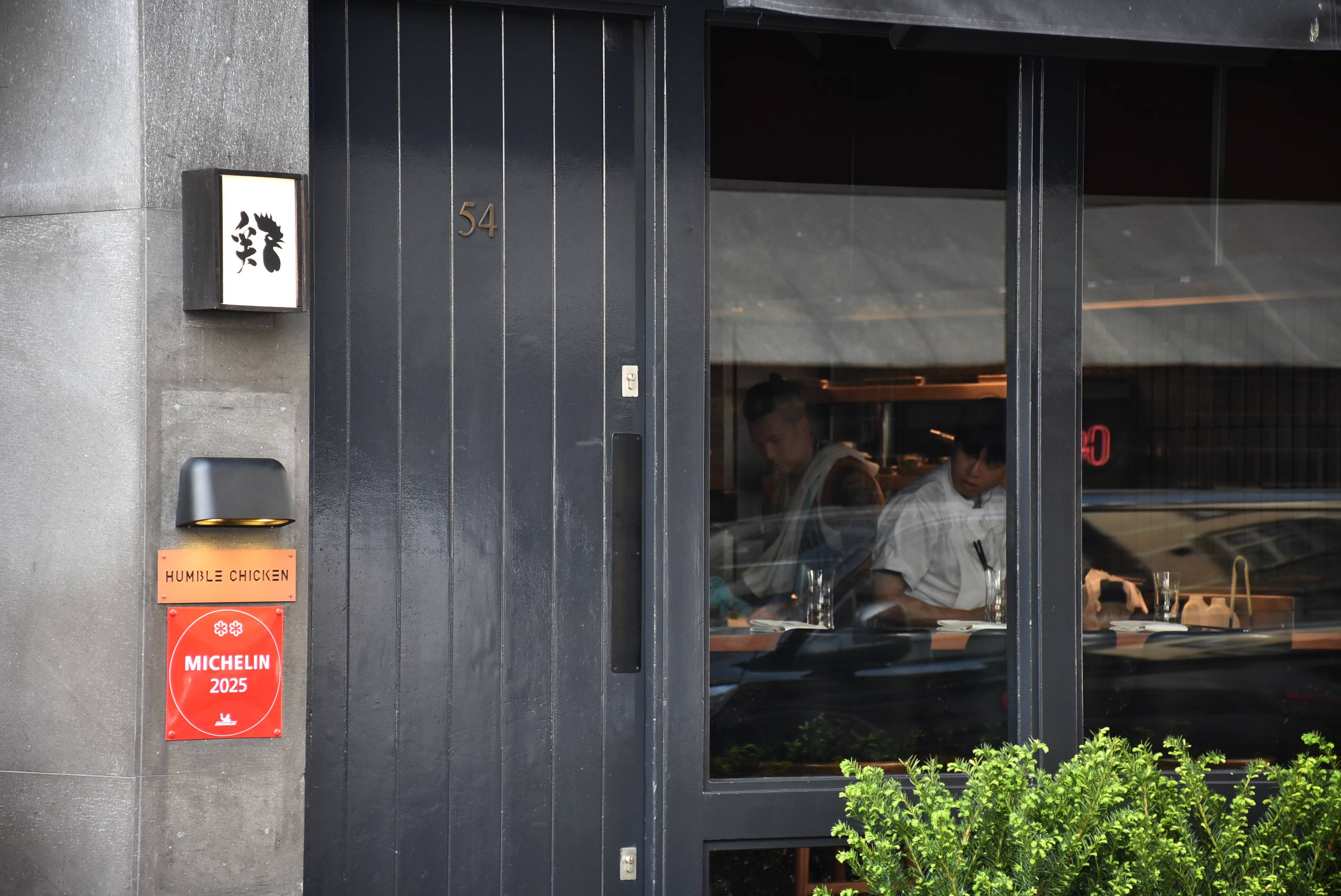
- The entrance to Humble Chicken on Frith Street
- Interactive map of Humble Chicken

Restaurant information
- Established: January 2021
- Owner: Angelo Sato
- Manager: Aiden Monk
- Head chef: Angelo Sato
- Food type: Japanese
- Rating: 2 Michelin stars
- Location: 54 Frith Street, Soho, London, W1D 4SL, United Kingdom
- Coordinates: 51°30′49.8″N 0°07′54.3″W
- Website: humblechickenuk.com

Humble Chicken is a Michelin-starred Japanese restaurant in London, United Kingdom. The restaurant was opened in 2021 and currently serves a multi-course set menu.

== History ==
The restaurant was initially opened by Angelo Sato in 2021 as a casual yakitori bar, before pivoting to a more high-end format in 2023. This new format involved changing from à la carte to an eight-course tasting menu of various European-inspired Japanese dishes.

In March 2025, after being awarded a second Michelin star, the restaurant was closed for a second major overhaul. The interior was refurbished and covers were reduced from 20 to 13. Sato said in an Instagram post that his goal with this refurbishment was to achieve a third Michelin star.

The restaurant eventually reopened in June 2025 with the branding Humble Chicken 3.0.

== Menu ==
The restaurant currently serves a 16 course lunch and dinner tasting menu for £235 per person. Most of the menu centres around seafood, though there are meat dishes on offer too such as pigeon. Some signature dishes have been on the menu since 2023, including the avocado-stuffed mussel. The restaurant also has its own fermentation wall for pickles, koji and soy sauce.

== Chef and restaurateur ==
Angelo Sato was born in May 1992 to a Japanese father and a German mother in Japan. He was brought up in the Children of God religious cult until the age of 14. He first started cooking while a part of the cult. Sato said his childhood was "normal", though he added that the lack of education for children in the cult meant he struggled "in the real world".

After his father died when he was 15, Sato left home and got a job at a restaurant in Tokyo. Before his shifts, he would work for free at a fish market to practice filleting. At age 18, he moved to London and started work as a commis chef at Restaurant Gordon Ramsay.

After a year at the restaurant, Sato left and worked at Trinity in Clapham for a few years before moving to New York to work at Eleven Madison Park. His first head chef role was in 2013 at Restaurant Story near Tower Bridge.

Before opening Humble Chicken, Sato started up two Japanese food-to-go businesses: a bento restaurant called Mission Sato in 2017 and a rice bowl restaurant called Omoide in 2018. Both have since shut down.

== Reception ==
Humble Chicken was awarded its first Michelin star in 2024. It went on to receive its second star the following year in 2025. The Michelin guide describes the restaurant's tasting menu as "theatrical" and praises the kitchen's "immense precision and technical skill".

The restaurant has been reviewed favourably by food critics Jay Rayner and Giles Coren. The Financial Times listed Humble Chicken's third refurbishment as one of London's best new restaurants of 2025.

== See also ==
- List of Japanese restaurants
- List of Michelin-starred restaurants in Greater London
