= Story (restaurant) =

Restaurant in London, United Kingdom

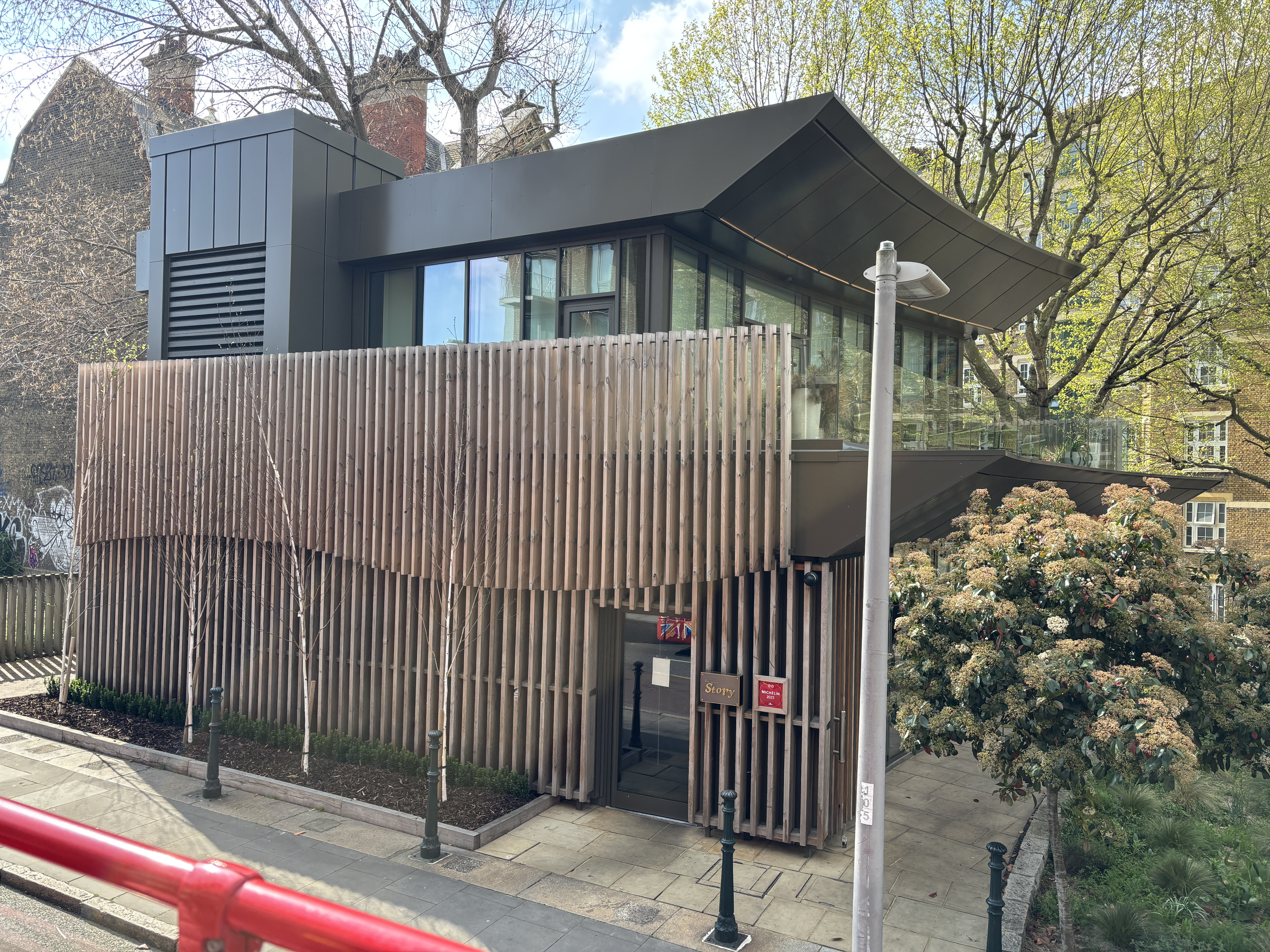
- Interactive map of Story

Restaurant information
- Established: April 2013
- Chef: Tom Sellers
- Rating: 2 Michelin stars
- Location: 199 Tooley Street, Southwark, London, United Kingdom
- Coordinates: 51°30′10.1″N 0°04′40.0″W
- Website: restaurantstory.co.uk

Story is a Michelin-starred restaurant in London, United Kingdom.

== See also ==
- List of Michelin-starred restaurants in Greater London
