= Leroy (restaurant) =

British restaurant in London, United Kingdom

- Interactive map of Leroy

Restaurant information
- Established: March 21, 2018
- Closed: November 16, 2024
- Food type: British
- Location: London, United Kingdom
- Coordinates: 51.5241°N 0.0815°W

Leroy was a British restaurant in Shoreditch, London, which opened in March 2018. It was awarded a Michelin Star in 2019, which it held until February 2024. It closed in November of the same year.

== See also ==
- List of British restaurants
- List of Michelin-starred restaurants in Greater London
