= Plates (restaurant) =

Vegan restaurant in London, England

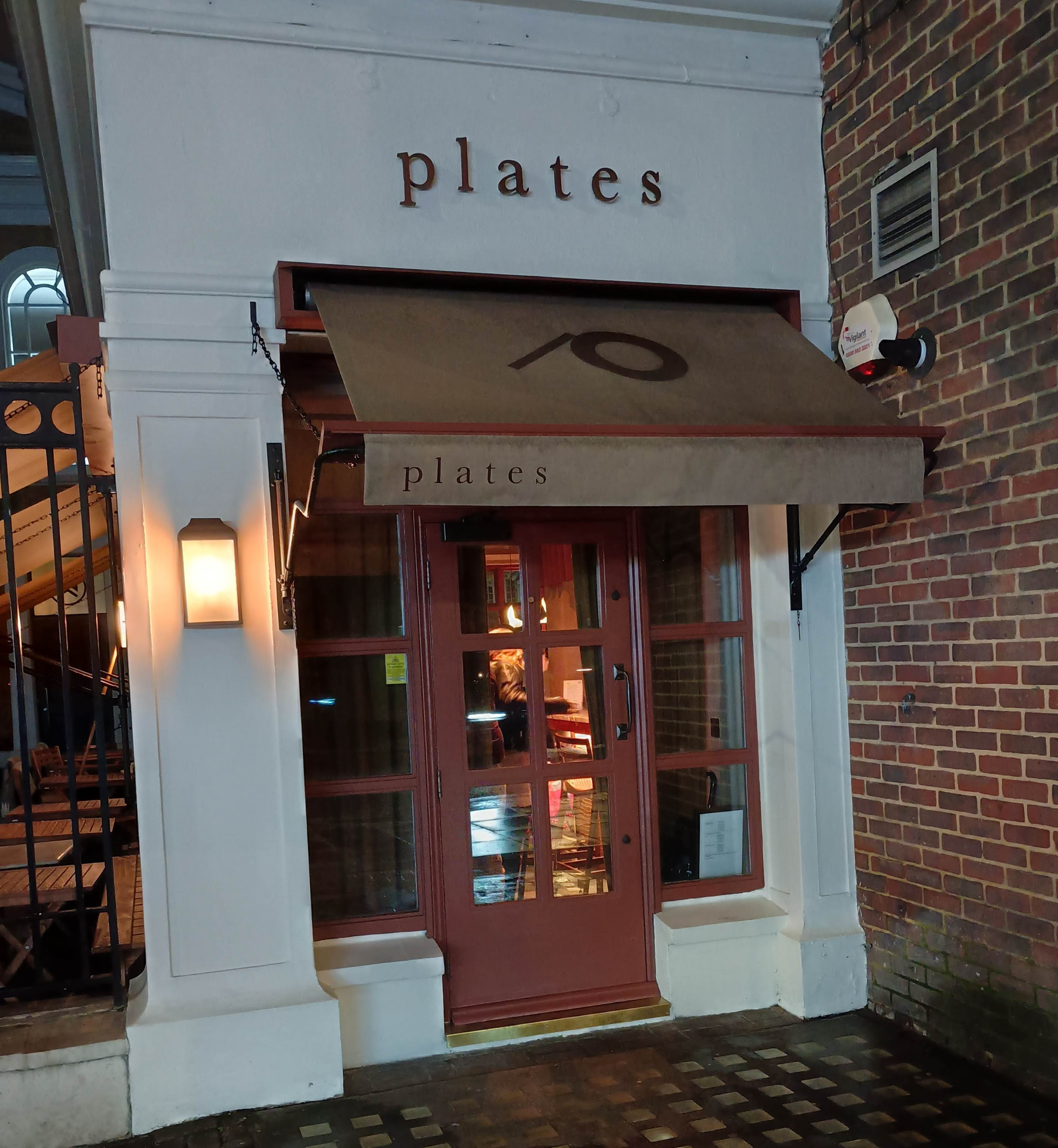
- Plates' front door
- Interactive map of Plates

Restaurant information
- Established: 2024
- Food type: Vegan
- Rating: 1 Michelin star
- Location: 320 Old Street, London, United Kingdom
- Coordinates: 51.5266°N 0.0820°W

Plates is a Michelin-starred, fine dining vegan restaurant in the Shoreditch neighbourhood of London, United Kingdom.

== History ==
The restaurant opened in 2024 and found immediate success with significant demand. In December 2025, there was a four month waiting list for a reservation. It was founded by chef Kirk Haworth and his sister Keeley Haworth. Kirk Haworth, who has appeared on the BBC's Great British Menu, began cooking without meat, dairy, or refined sugar in response to contracting Lyme disease. It first achieved a Michelin star in 2025 making it the first vegan restaurant in the UK to achieve such an award. An estimated 95% of its customers are not vegan.

== Menu ==
The menu at Plates focuses on vegetables and mushrooms. Menus have included maitake mushroom with black bean mole; caramelised lion’s mane mushroom with cauliflower cream, smoked shio koji, rhubarb and fermented green peppercorn sauce; Cornish potatoes with toasted hazelnuts and sweet and sour apricot; and raw cocoa gateau with sour cherry.

== See also ==
- List of Michelin-starred restaurants in Greater London
- List of vegetarian and vegan restaurants
