= Evelyn's Table =

Restaurant in London, United Kingdom

Restaurant information
- Established: January 23, 2018
- Owners: Layo Paskin; Zoe Paskin
- Head chef: Seamus Sam
- Food type: Contemporary
- Rating: (Michelin Guide)
- Location: Westminster, London, United Kingdom
- Seating capacity: 12
- Website: https://www.theblueposts.co.uk/evelyns-table/

Evelyn's Table is a Michelin-starred restaurant in London, United Kingdom.

An intimate 12-seater counter dining experience – Evelyn's Table is located in the basement beer cellar of the Blue Posts pub.

Since August 2024, Seamus Sam, former head chef at the Michelin-starred Muse in Kensington and Chelsea, has led the restaurant's kitchen. He succeeded James Goodyear, who served as head chef from January 2023 to August 2024. Before that, the kitchen was helmed by brothers Luke, Nat, and Theo Selby.

== Recognition ==
Evelyn's Table has held a Michelin Star since 2022.

== See also ==
- List of Michelin-starred restaurants in Greater London
