= Brooklands (restaurant) =

Restaurant in London, United Kingdom

Coordinates: 51.5018°N 0.1523°W

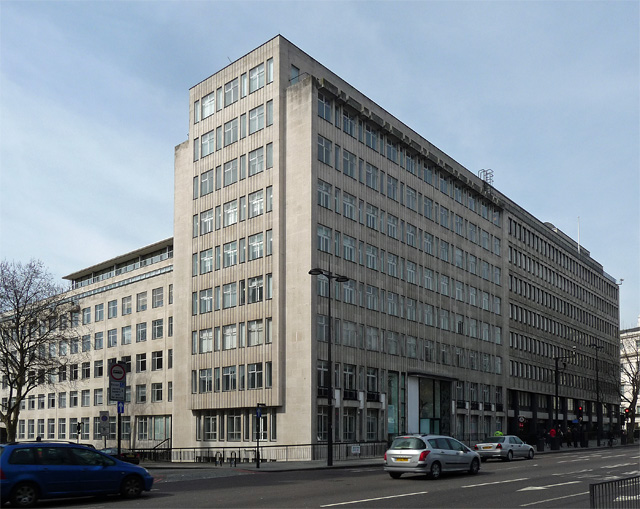
- The building in which Brooklands is located
- Interactive map of Brooklands

Restaurant information
- Location: The Peninsula London, 1 Grosvenor Place, London, SW1X 7H
- Website: brooklandslondon.com

Brooklands by Claude Bosi, or simply Brooklands, is a Michelin-starred restaurant in London, United Kingdom.

== See also ==
- List of Michelin-starred restaurants in Greater London
