= Social Eating House =

Defunct restaurant in London, United Kingdom

- Interactive map of Social Eating House

Restaurant information
- Location: London, United Kingdom
- Coordinates: 51.5138°N 0.1366°W

Social Eating House was a restaurant in London, United Kingdom. It had received a Michelin star before closing.

== See also ==
- List of Michelin-starred restaurants in Greater London
