= Angler (London restaurant) =

Seafood restaurant in London, England

- Interactive map of Angler

Restaurant information
- Established: 2012
- Food type: Seafood
- Rating: 1 Michelin star
- Location: 3 South Place, London, United Kingdom
- Coordinates: 51.5191°N 0.0864°W

Angler is a seafood restaurant in London, United Kingdom.

== History ==
The restaurant opened in 2012 alongside the South Palace Hotel, located on the seventh floor. It has a rooftop terrace and DJ. It was first awarded a Michelin-star in 2014. The menu is based on British cuisine, with influences from Mediterranean, Asian and French, and Nordic cuisine. There is a focus on the food served at Angler being sourced sustainably.

== Reception ==
The restaurant received a Michelin star. Ben Norum, in a review for The Standard, gave it 4/5 stars, praising the menu and atmosphere. Zoe Williams, writing for The Telegraph, gave the menu a more mixed review and awarded it 3/5 stars.

== See also ==
- List of Michelin-starred restaurants in Greater London
