= Locanda Locatelli =

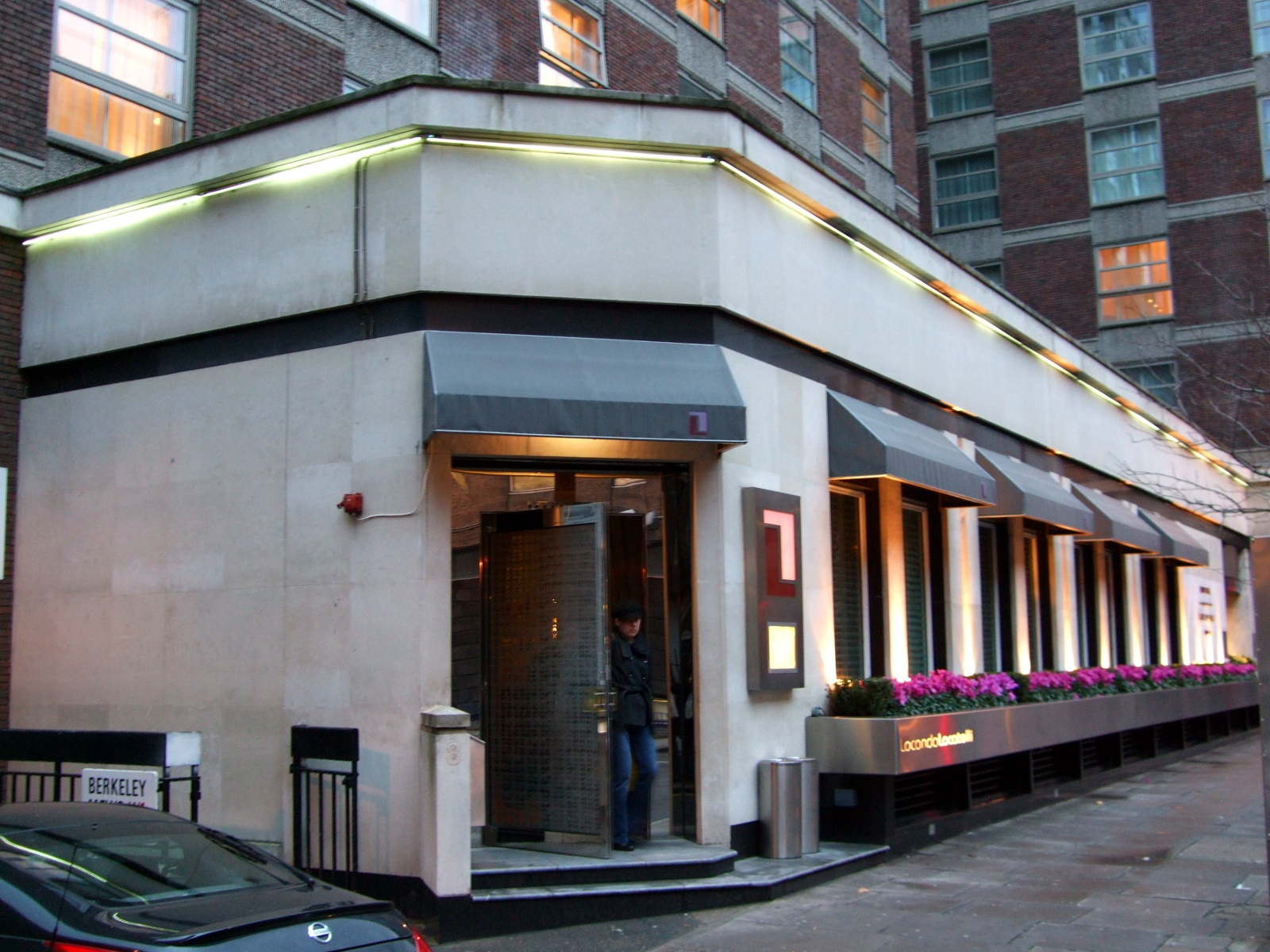
- The restaurant in 2008

- Location within Central London

Restaurant information
- Established: 2002
- Closed: 2025
- Owner: Giorgio Locatelli
- Head chef: Sergio Fontana
- Food type: Italian
- Dress code: Smart casual
- Rating: (Michelin Guide); AA Rosettes
- Location: 8 Seymour Street, London, W1H 7JZ, United Kingdom
- Coordinates: 51°30′54″N 0°9′26″W
- Seating capacity: 90
- Reservations: Yes
- Other information: Nearest station: Marble Arch
- Website: www.locandalocatelli.com

Locanda Locatelli was a Michelin-starred restaurant owned by Italian chef Giorgio Locatelli and his wife, Plaxy. Located in the corner of the 5-star Churchill Hotel on Seymour Street in the West End of London, the restaurant specialised in Italian cuisine.

== Description ==
Locanda Locatelli opened in February 2002. The restaurant served traditional Italian dishes, with a particular emphasis on fresh pasta and regional Italian breads. There were also a variety of meat and fish dishes, as well as desserts.

The restaurant was awarded a Michelin star in 2003, which it retained for over 20 years.

A gas explosion occurred at the restaurant in November 2014, causing it to be closed for 4 months. 14 staff were injured and 400 people were evacuated. 6 fire engines and 35 firefighters attended the scene. The restaurant reopened on 14 March 2015. Reservations could be made via phone or on OpenTable.

The restaurant closed permanently in January 2025 after 23 years of business, with Giorgio Locatelli citing reasons out of their control as the cause of closure.
