= Kai Mayfair =

- Interactive map of Kai Mayfair

Restaurant information
- Established: 1993
- Owner: Bernard Yeoh
- Head chef: Alex Chow
- Food type: Modern Chinese
- Dress code: Smart casual/relaxed
- Rating: (Michelin Guide) (2009 - 2024)
- Location: 65 South Audley Street, Mayfair, London, United Kingdom
- Coordinates: 51°30′32″N 0°09′06″W
- Reservations: Optional
- Other information: Nearest station: Marble Arch; Bond Street
- Website: www.kaimayfair.co.uk

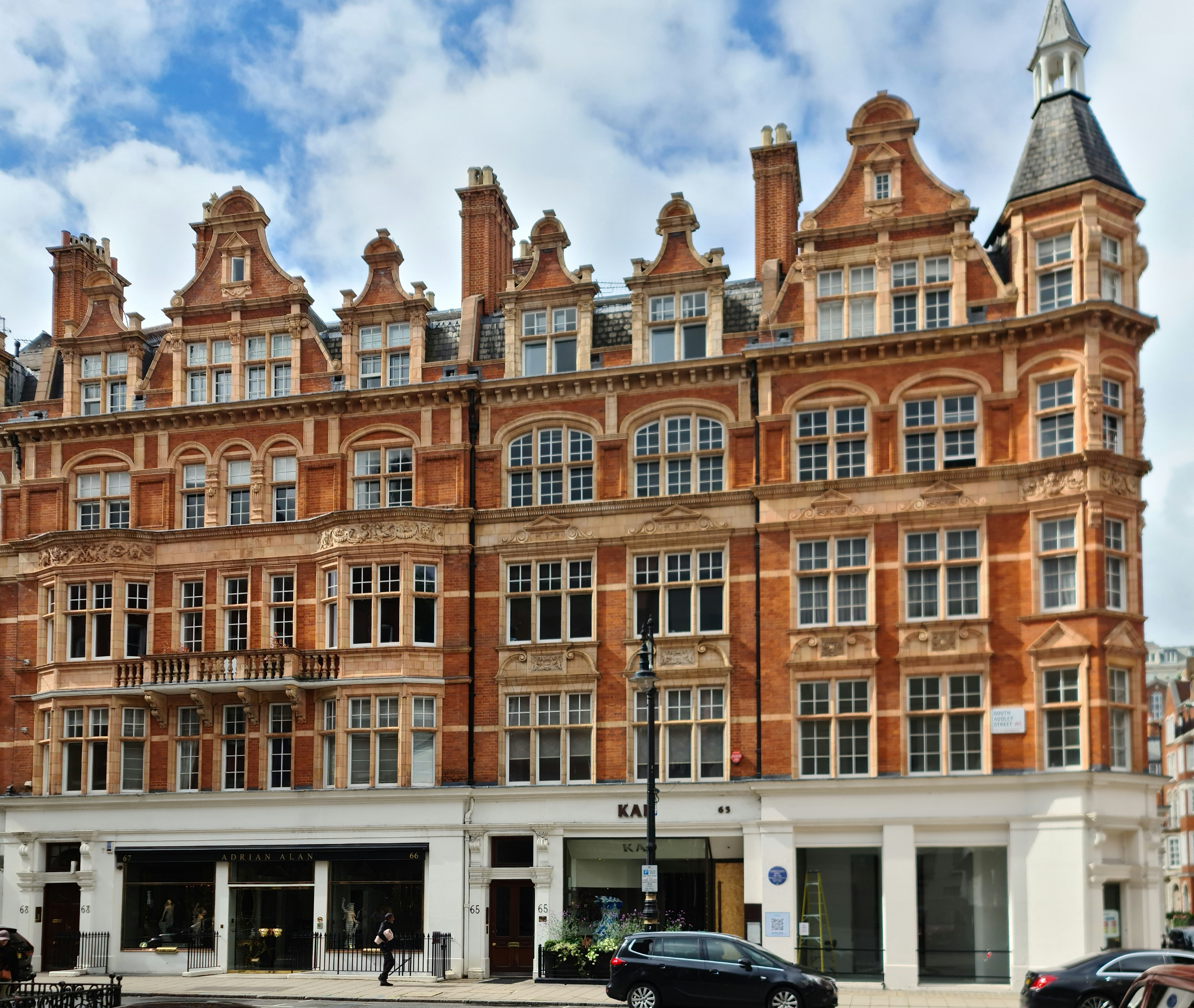
63-65 South Audrey Street London

Kai Mayfair is a fine dining Chinese restaurant located on 65 South Audley Street, Mayfair, near Park Lane in London, England. It was opened in 1993 by Malaysian sport shooter; Bernard Yeoh, with the intent of changing the perception of the Chinese restaurant experience. Yeoh was keen to show that Asian food could have just as much standing in the fine-dining circuit as other cuisines. The head chef is Alex Chow.

Kai Mayfair was named the Zagat Survey's Best Chinese Restaurant in London for two years from 2003 - 2005. The restaurant also received nominations for Restaurant magazine's UK Best Dishes as well as Tatler magazine's Best Kitchen Awards in 2006. In 2009 the Harden's Guide named it the year's "Best Chinese Restaurant in London", and the Michelin Guide awarded it one star. It was also the only Chinese restaurant added to the 2009 Michelin List in the UK. Kai Mayfair retained the star until losing it in the 2025 Michelin Guide.

The cuisine style has been described as 'Modern Chinese', which "mixes tradition with innovation", with the restaurant serving 'Liberated' Chinese cooking from the Nanyang region. The menu includes traditional, familiar dishes like prawn toast and sweet & sour pork but there are also many unfamiliar dishes like Nanyang chilli lobster and spring chicken & Sichuan spicy crumble, which is where the restaurant's "true culinary personality can be found", according to Yeoh's message at the start of the menu. The restaurant also offers an afternoon tea, available from 15:00 - 16:30 pm Wednesday to Sunday.

Kai Mayfair was dubbed "home of the world's most expensive soup" when it unveiled its £108 version of Buddha Jumps Over the Wall in 2005. The dish includes shark's fin, Japanese flower mushroom, sea cucumber, dried scallops, chicken, Hunan ham, pork, and ginseng.

== See also ==
- List of Chinese restaurants
- List of restaurants in London
