= Kitchen Table =

Restaurant in London, England

Coordinates: 51.5204°N 0.1365°W

- Interactive map of Kitchen Table

Restaurant information
- Established: 2012; 14 years ago
- Owners: James Knappett and Sandia Chang
- Head chef: James Knappett
- Food type: Modern British
- Dress code: Smart-casual, no baseball caps allowed
- Rating: (Michelin Guide); AA Rosettes
- Location: 70 Charlotte Street, Fitzrovia, London, W1, United Kingdom
- Seating capacity: 19
- Reservations: Up to 3 months in advance
- Other information: Nearest station: Goodge Street
- Website: kitchentablelondon.co.uk

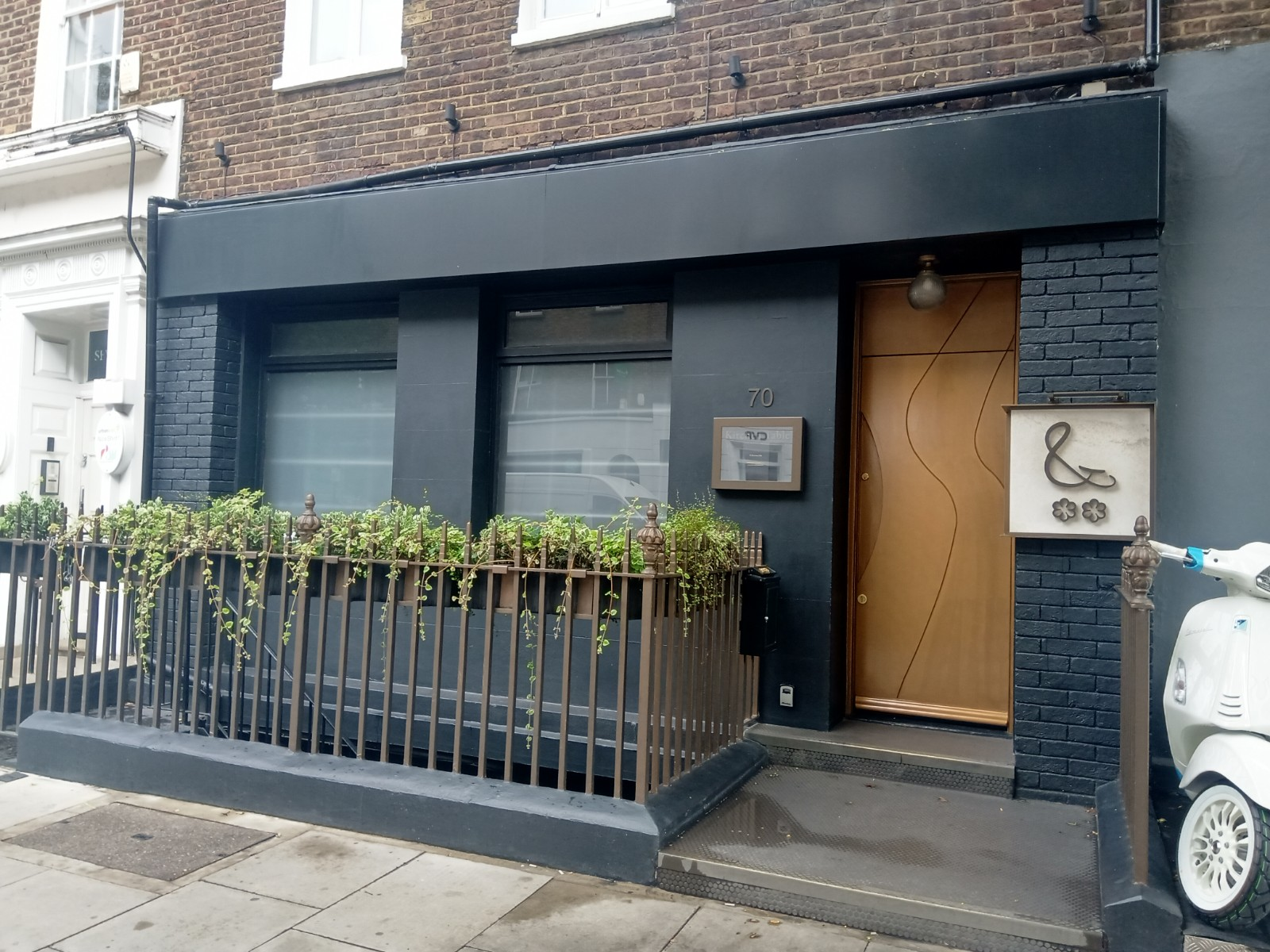

Kitchen Table is a restaurant located in London, England. It was opened in 2012 by husband and wife, James Knappett and Sandia Chang. Along with the restaurant, they also opened a Champagne bar called Bubbledogs at the same site, but this was closed permanently due to the COVID-19 pandemic, with the old space being converted into a lounge for customers dining at Kitchen Table.

== Description ==
The restaurant is located in Charlotte Street, close to other Michelin-starred restaurants Pied à Terre and The Ninth. The cuisine style of the restaurant is largely Modern British, with other countries also having an influence. The restaurant serves only one daily-changing tasting menu (vegetarian option available) each day, priced at £250 per person, which is focused on the element of surprise as no diner knows what dishes are going to be served until they are presented to them. The menu is typically long, with the number of courses often reaching 20. A copy of the day's menu is given to each customer at the end of the meal. The style of service at the restaurant is unique. After a few canapés in the lounge, for the main part of the experience, customers are led to a small, intimate dining room where everyone is seated at the same time at a U-shaped table, surrounding the kitchen. This allows full views of the chefs working and dishes being prepared. Customers will then return to the lounge for some petit fours, completing the experience. Each dish is explained in detail by Knappett or another chef. The whole experience lasts around 4 hours.

== Reception ==
Kitchen Table was awarded its first Michelin star in the 2015 guide and its second in the 2019 guide, and retained both. The restaurant was also awarded Michelin's 'Welcome and Service Award' in 2018.

== See also ==
- List of British restaurants
