= City Social =

Restaurant in London, United Kingdom

- Interactive map of City Social

Restaurant information
- Established: 1 May 2014
- Chef: Jason Atherton
- Location: Tower 42, 25 Old Broad Street, City of London, London, EC2N 1HQ, United Kingdom
- Coordinates: 51°30′54.6″N 0°5′2.6″W
- Website: citysocial-london.com

City Social is a restaurant in London, United Kingdom, opened by chef Jason Atherton in May 2014. It is located in Tower 42, a skyscraper in the City of London, in the space formerly occupied by Gary Rhodes' restaurant Rhodes Twenty Four.

City Social was awarded a Michelin star shortly after opening, a distinction it held until 2025.
