= Angler (video game) =

1983 video game

- Publisher: Virgin Games
- Designer: Dirk Olivier
- Platform: ZX Spectrum
- Release: 1983
- Genre: Fishing
- Mode: Single-player

Angler is a fishing video game written by Dirk Olivier for the ZX Spectrum and published 1983 by Virgin Games. The player controls a fishing trawler along the top of the screen and has 100 casts to catch as many fish as possible.
