= Aulis (restaurant) =

Restaurant in London, United Kingdom

- Interactive map of Aulis

Restaurant information
- Food type: British
- Location: London, United Kingdom
- Coordinates: 51.5143°N 0.1343°W

Aulis is a Michelin-starred restaurant in London, United Kingdom. It serves British cuisine.

== See also ==
- List of British restaurants
- List of Michelin starred restaurants in Greater London
