= Aulis (given name) =

Aulis is a masculine Finnish given name. The name means "helpful", "generous". Notable people with the name include:

- Aulis Akonniemi (born 1958), Finnish shot putter
- Aulis Kallakorpi (1929–2005), Finnish ski jumper
- Aulis Koponen (1906–1978), Finnish footballer
- Aulis Rytkönen (1929–2014), Finnish football player and football manager
- Aulis Sallinen (born 1935), Finnish contemporary classical music composer
