= Quilon Restaurant =

Michelin starred Indian restaurant in London

Coordinates: 51.4988°N 0.1377°W

- Interactive map of Quilon Restaurant

Restaurant information
- Established: 1999
- Location: London

Taj Quilon Restaurant is a restaurant situated in Buckingham Gate, London. The restaurant was opened in 1999 and owned by Taj hotels. It is the first South Indian restaurant in the world to win a Michelin star, which it has retained since 2008. The restaurant was named after Quilon, the old name of Kollam.
