= Club Gascon =

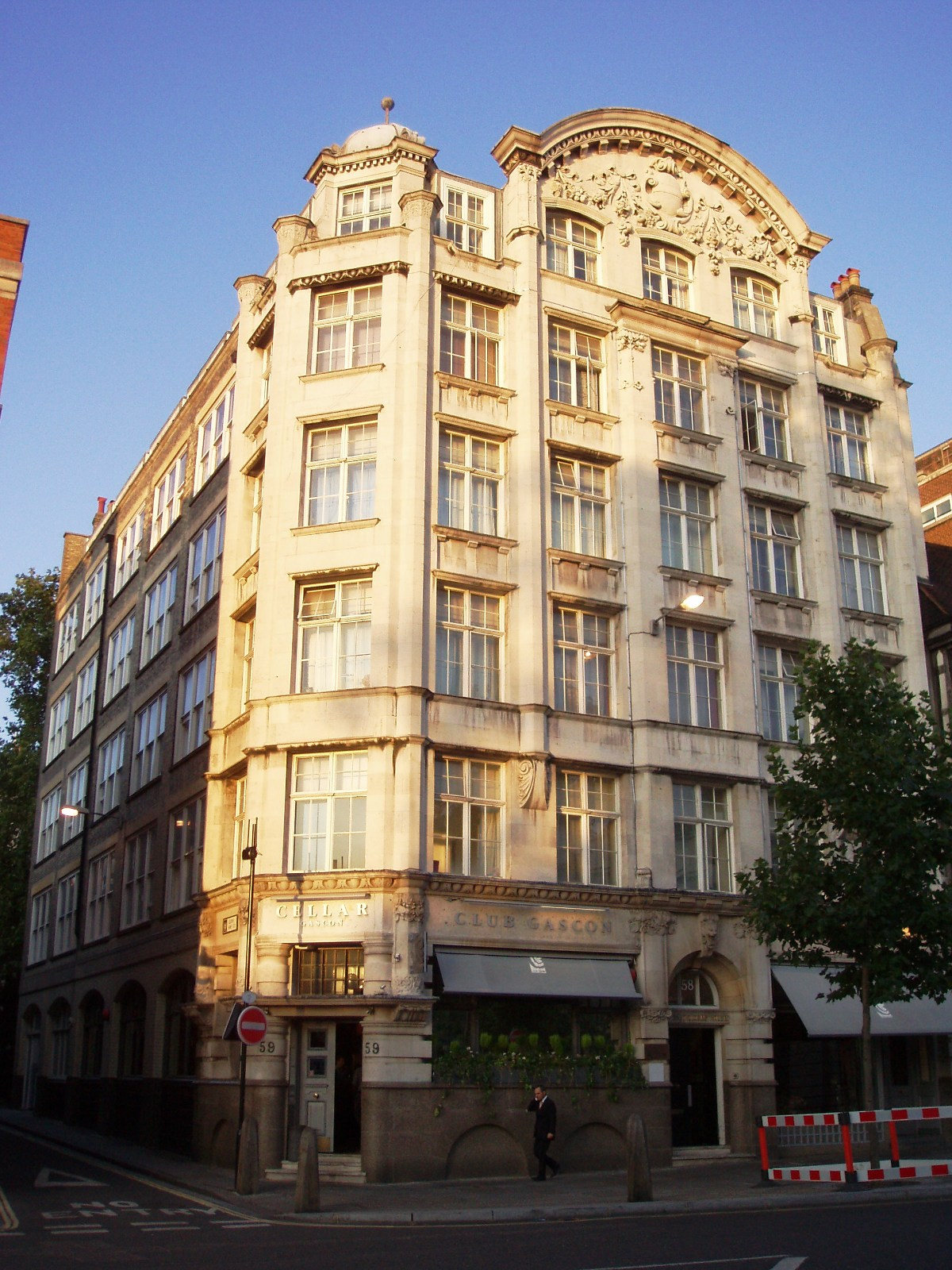
- The exterior of Club Gascon
- Interactive map of Club Gascon

Restaurant information
- Closed: 28 March 2026
- Head chef: Pascal Aussignac
- Food type: French cuisine
- Rating: (Michelin Guide 2025)
- Location: 57 West Smithfield, London, EC1, United Kingdom
- Coordinates: 51°31′07″N 0°06′01″W
- Seating capacity: 40
- Other information: Nearest station: Barbican
- Website: ClubGascon.com

Club Gascon was a French restaurant located in London, England. As of 2002, the restaurant held one star in the Michelin Guide. The French restaurant was opened by Pascal Aussignac and Vincent Labeyrie in October 1998, and served French cuisine. In addition to its Michelin star, it also won two Catey Awards.

== Description ==
Opened by chef Pascal Aussignac and business partner Vincent Labeyrie in September 1998, the restaurant was located near St Bartholomew-the-Great in Smithfield, London. The premises itself was formerly a Lyon's Tea House, then a bank, and then had been empty for six years. The freehold is owned by Centrepoint, a charity for young homeless people. The dining area was one long narrow room, with large tables down one side and smaller tables elsewhere. Aussignac had previously failed to find financing to open a restaurant in Paris, but by 2008 was employing sixty workers across three restaurants in London. The restaurant was considered a forerunner of fine dining in its local area, which has since become popular with other restaurants appearing nearby.

== Reviews and awards ==
"I have very high standards," wrote restaurant critic AA Gill "but Club Gascon was a fabulous surprise." Caroline Stacy reviewed the restaurant shortly after it opened for The Independent, described some of the dishes as "exceptional", but felt that the cassoulet was disappointing. The New York Times recommended the restaurant in 2000. Jan Moir of The Daily Telegraph reviewed the restaurant in February 2002, describing it as producing the "deep, velvety succulence of the flavours of south-west France". Richard Vines, writing for Bloomberg in 2006 explained that while the dining was slow-paced, it was worth it and said if it wasn't for him being a food reporter, he'd be a regular there.

The restaurant won Best Newcomer at The Catey Awards in 1999, followed in 2002 by a Michelin star. In 2007, the restaurant was ranked 35th best in the UK by the Good Food Guide, on the first occasion the guide ranked restaurants in that manner (previously it had given marks out of ten for each establishment). In 2007, it won a second Catey Award, this time for Restaurateur of the Year – Independent.

In 2013, it won the "Test of Time" award (for the most consistently excellent restaurant) at the Tatler Restaurant Awards. The same year, in June, Pascal Aussignac was awarded also won the Restaurant Chef of the Year by the Craft Guild of Chefs Awards.

In 2017, after 19 years of operation, the restaurant was fully refurbished, and the kitchen was extended.

== Closure ==
On 3 February 2026 it was announced "with a heavy heart" that Club Gascon would be closing its doors, with its final service on 28 March 2026. Sister restaurant Cigalon along with cocktail bars Le Bar and Baranis remain open.
