= A. Wong =

Michelin-starred restaurant in London, England

Coordinates: 51.4930°N 0.1406°W

- Interactive map of A. Wong

Restaurant information
- Established: 2012
- Owner: Andrew Wong
- Food type: Cantonese
- Rating: Michelin stars (2021–present) (2017–2021)
- Location: 70 Wilton Road, Pimlico, London, SW1V 1DE, United Kingdom
- Website: awong.co.uk

A. Wong is a Michelin-starred Chinese restaurant, located in Pimlico, London. It serves modern British retake on traditional Cantonese dishes. It is owned by Andrew Wong, a third-generation London restaurateur who is also the restaurant's chef de cuisine.

== History ==
In 2012, Andrew Wong, a third-generation restaurateur, opened A. Wong, named after his parents, in Pimlico and became its chef patron. The site was previously the location of his parents' Cantonese restaurant Kym. Wong's wife Nathalie manages the restaurant.

Among notable guests of the restaurant were brothers Ferran and Albert Adrià of El Bulli.

== Menu ==
The restaurant has provided traditional Cantonese dishes with modern British twists. The menu has been seasonal and included Peking duck, guotie (pan-fried dumpling) and xiaolongbao (Shanghai pork dumpling) with ginger-flavoured vinegar foam. It has also offered the "Taste of China" tasting menu, which included "soy chicken, ginger oil osetra caviar wrap", Shaanxi shredded lamb 'burger' "with Xinjiang pomegranate salad", char siu "with grated foie gras", "Chengdu street tofu", "Anhui fermented seabass", and "Wuwei smoked duck" (无为熏鸭).

A. Wong also offered a Xinjiang-inspired dish of deep-fried beef strips with chili and a sauce; "'1,000 chili' chicken with snails and Sichuan pepper"; Kung Pao chicken; "seared wagyu beef with mint, chili and lemongrass"; aubergine with Sichuan sauce; and crispy noodles with brown gravy. It also has offered dim sum dishes, like prawn cracker with deep-fried seaweed and "pork and prawn dumpling" with "a citrus foam", and desserts, like duck egg custard and "poached merengue with fruit textures".

A. Wong also offered "Why We Don't Eat Shark Fin Soup", a soup dish containing agar and chicken broth with oil extracted from steamed ham "rolled in sugar". Derived from shark fin soup, Wong's dish substituted agar for shark fins because shark finning is banned in the United Kingdom and elsewhere. A. Wong also offered "Why The Buddha Didn't Jump Over the Wall" ("barbecued sweet potato with some fermented, salted black-bean relish"), inspired by the Columbian exchange in the 1500s and based on a popular Cantonese dish of "pumpkin and black bean sauce". Wong wrote a 2015 cookbook, A. Wong: The Cookbook.

== Reception ==
A. Wong earned its first Michelin star in October 2017. In January 2021, it became the first Chinese restaurant outside Asia to achieve two Michelin stars. Ben McCormack in November 2018 called A. Wong "the best restaurant in Victoria" and "possibly the best Chinese restaurant in Europe".

== Chef and restaurateur ==
Wong was born in early 1980s into a family that operates Chinese restaurants, including his parents Albert and Annie. Wong's grandfather, a Chinese immigrant, owned some East End pubs and a restaurant in Chinatown, London. Wong initially did not aspire a career in hospitality, and his father wanted him to pursue further education.

Wong attended the University of Oxford for a bachelor's degree in chemistry but did not finish after one year and a half. He then studied social anthropology at the London School of Economics. In 2003, due to his father's death, Wong decided to help his mother Annie run the family's four remaining Chinese restaurants, including one Cantonese restaurant, Kym's, opened in 1985 by Wong's parents and named after his grandmother. Wong then took cooking classes at Westminster Kingsway College and spent six months in China studying varieties of Chinese cuisine.

Wong opened another Chinese restaurant Baoshuan in New Delhi in 2018. He also operated another Chinese restaurant Kym's, which lasted from March 2019 to late 2020, in Bloomberg Arcade of London. He became a research associate at the SOAS Food Studies Centre of the SOAS University of London in May 2020.

Wong also co-hosts XO Soused, a podcast exploring the cultural history of Chinese food, with Dr Mukta Das, food anthropologist at the SOAS Food Studies Centre.
