= Rhodes Twenty Four =

- Location within Central London

Restaurant information
- Established: 1 September 2003
- Closed: 1 May 2014
- Chef: Gary Rhodes
- Food type: Modern British cuisine
- Dress code: Formal
- Rating: (Michelin Guide 2008)
- Location: Tower 42; 25 Old Broad St, London, EC2N 1HQ, UK
- Coordinates: 51°30′56″N 0°5′2″W
- Seating capacity: 85 covers
- Website: www.rhodes24.co.uk

Rhodes Twenty Four was a Michelin-starred restaurant in the City of London, operated by celebrity chef Gary Rhodes from 2003 to 2014. It was situated on the 24th floor of the former NatWest Tower (officially Tower 42), offering views of the surrounding cityscape.

== Description ==
Rhodes Twenty Four opened in 2003, following the closure of restaurants City Rhodes and Rhodes in the Square the previous year. Located on the 24th floor of Tower 42 in a location formerly used by Roux Fine Dining, it served modern British cuisine described in its initial press release as "Very British Fayre". Chef Gary Rhodes was introduced into the space by Albert Roux, who put him in touch with the company looking to revamp the former Restaurant Twentyfour. The original agreement was to take over the restaurant, private dining rooms and bar for an initial five years. The restaurant was funded by Restaurant Associates, and fronted by Rhodes using the chef's signature dishes (including his bread and butter pudding and jaffa cake dessert).

Rhodes described his hopes for the restaurant on launch: "If we never get a Michelin star here, I will be very disappointed, but what I really want is customers." It won a Michelin star in 2005, which it retained until it closed as one of two Michelin starred restaurants for Gary Rhodes in London.

== Reception ==
Fay Maschler reviewed the restaurant on the second day after opening in November 2003, giving four out five stars whilst describing the meal as good hearty food. Rick Stein, who happened to be dining with the critic, described a potted mackerel and gooseberry jelly dish as "quite nice stuff". Marina O'Loughlin, writing for the Metro in the same month, also gave four out of five stars and said that the food gave "superior comfort food with a view". Giles Coren reviewed Rhodes Twenty Four in December 2003 for The Times. He found a great deal of difficulty in booking a table, which was only alleviated after revealing himself as a restaurant critic. He described the menu as being "standard" for a Gary Rhodes restaurant, but said that it was "not in the class of Gary’s two recent closures", but "competent". He gave an overall score of six out of ten.

A review in January 2004 in The Independent described the restaurant as being like a "boardroom", but praised the use of both suet and mutton on the menu, giving an overall score of thirteen out of twenty. The Evening Standard conducted a second review in 2005, with Toby Young visiting the restaurant. He gave it two stars out of five, describing the food as "OK, but nothing special" and criticising the restaurant for only serving locally-grown, in-season produce. Mark Bolland reviewed it again for the Evening Standard in April 2008, describing it as being much like an airport terminal but said that the menu was imaginative and featured the expected Rhodes twists, but found that the service was slow and robotic; giving the restaurant three out of five stars.

Since 1 May 2014, the site has been occupied by City Social, a Jason Atherton and Restaurant Associates venture.

== See also ==
- List of British restaurants
