= Alexis Gauthier =

French chef

- Born: 24 June 1973 (age 53); Avignon, Provence, France
- Culinary career
- Cooking style: French cuisine
- Rating
- Michelin stars
- Current restaurants
- Gauthier Soho; 123 Vegan
- Previous restaurant
- Roussillon
- Television shows
- MasterChef: The Professionals; MasterChef

Alexis Pascal Gauthier (born 24 June 1973) is a French chef. He is the chef patron of the Gauthier Soho restaurant in Soho, London and was awarded a Michelin star in 2011. He previously held a Michelin star as head chef of the restaurant Roussillon in Pimlico, London, until 2010. He trained under Alain Ducasse at Le Louis XV in Monaco, and has appeared as a judge on two versions of the BBC One television show MasterChef. He became a vegan in 2016 and changed Gauthier Soho to a vegan menu in 2021 and opened 123 Vegan, a vegan cafeteria.

== Career ==
In 1991 he started working in a restaurant for the first time, at the Hotel Negresco in Nice, France. He moved to work under Alain Ducasse at his Le Louis XV restaurant in Monaco between 1993 and 1996. He left Ducasse's employment to go to Roussillon in Pimlico, London, which opened in 1998 with Gauthier as head chef. The restaurant had previously been known as Marabel's, but was relaunched upon Gauthier's arrival. In 2000, it was awarded a Michelin star. It was also awarded three AA Rosettes, and won the Time Out "Best Vegetarian Award" in both 2000 and 2001.

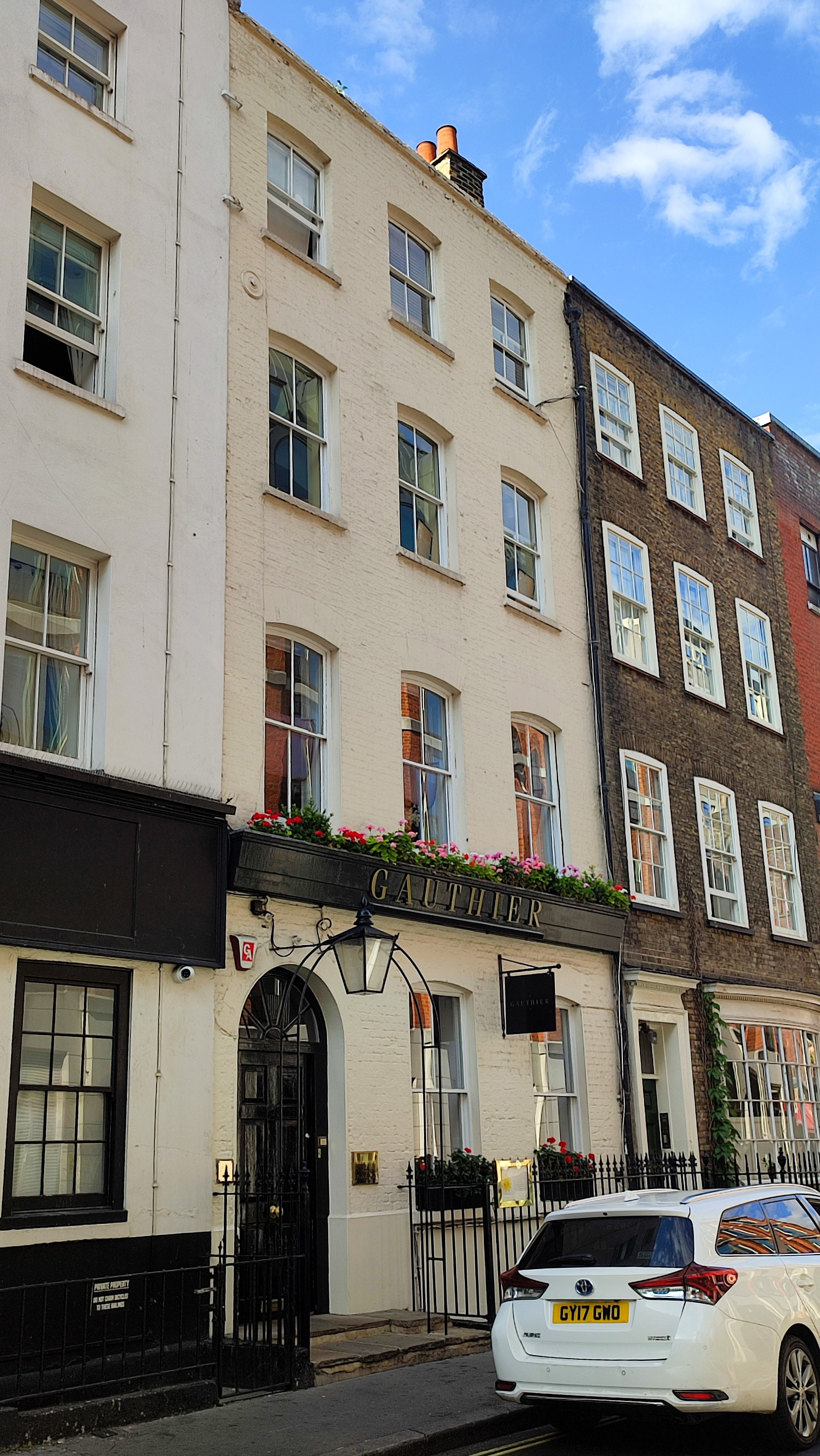
Gauthier Soho, Romilly Street, in 2025.

During the Bird Flu pandemic in 2005, Gauthier removed chicken, pigeon and foie gras from the menu at Roussillon after he noticed a drop in demand. Gauthier left Roussillon in 2010 to set up a new restaurant called Gauthier Soho; he had been looking for a new location to open his own restaurant as he wanted to move away from his two business partners. Gauthier kept his share of the ownership of Roussillon. Because of this, Roussillon lost its Michelin star and went on to go through two chefs before finally closing on 1 June 2012. After it closed, Gauthier stated to the industry press that he hoped to be able to buy back the location.

Gauthier Soho was set up in the space formerly occupied by the Richard Corrigan restaurant called Lindsay House. His takeover of the location included a full renovation of the location, with the conversion of the ground floor into a wine shop. The new restaurant was a joint venture between Gauthier and sommelier Roberto della Pietra. A year after its opening, the new restaurant was also awarded a Michelin star.

In 2011, whilst dining at the restaurant DuckSoup, Gauthier was seated at a table near to food critics Matthew Norman from The Daily Telegraph and Tracey MacLeod from The Independent. MacLeod had previously given Gauthier Soho a critical review, while Norman had given the restaurant the best review it had received in Gauthier's opinion. Whilst sitting there, Gauthier tweeted the actions of the food critics to his followers and criticised them on several points such as their loudness, a copy of The Independent sitting facing out in an open bag by MacLeod's feet and that Norman didn't know what aioli was. Gauthier later said that it was "nothing personal", and the critics took it in good spirits with Norman saying, "I am extremely loud in restaurants because I am a little hard of hearing, my wife is thrilled that this has finally been independently confirmed."

Gauthier doesn't believe in timers or pre-weighing food to determine cooking time. Instead, as demonstrated in his television appearances, he relies on touching food to determine whether or not it is cooked. He also likes to showcase vegetables in his cooking, saying that "if they have the right texture you can play with vegetables like meat or fish". Although he will create a vegetarian menu on request, his vegetable tasting menu at Gauthier Soho can include meat products such as a meat au jus in the preparation of the vegetables.

In 2015, Gauthier changed his vegetable menu to be fully vegan. The 'Les Plantes' menu went on to win 'Best Vegan Menu' at the PETA Food Awards 2016. Gauthier became a vegan in 2016; he is now opposed to the "savagery" of meat, and "excited about a vegan future". He is transitioning his restaurants to be fully plant-based.

=== Television work ===
He appeared with Gregg Wallace and Michel Roux Jr. as a judge on BBC One's MasterChef: The Professionals in October 2009. He later also appeared on the regular MasterChef series, once more alongside Wallace, and also with John Torode in March 2011 and March 2019.

== Personal life ==
Gauthier was diagnosed in October 2010 with a fatty liver, which resulted in him cutting down his calorie intake and listing calorie counts on his menu at Gauthier Soho.
