= Roger Vergé =

French chef and restaurateur

- Born: 7 April 1930; Commentry, Allier, France
- Died: 5 June 2015 (aged 85); Mougins, France
- Spouse: Denise Vergé
- Culinary career
- Cooking style: Nouvelle cuisine; Provençal
- Rating: Michelin stars
- Previous restaurants: Le Moulin de Mougins; L'Amandier de Mougins; Sutter 500; Le Médi; Cuisine du Soleil
- Website: www.moulindemougins.com

Roger Vergé (French pronunciation: [ʁɔʒe vɛʁʒe]; 7 April 1930 – 5 June 2015) was a French chef and restaurateur. The Gault Millau described him as "the very incarnation of the great French chef for foreigners".

== Personal life ==
Roger Vergé was born 7 April 1930 in Commentry, which is a commune in the department of Allier in central France.

His father was a blacksmith. He said he was inspired to learn cooking from his aunt Célestine, to whom he dedicated many of his books. He began work under Alexis Chanier at restaurant Le Bourbonnais in his aunt's hometown, and trained at the Tour d'Argent and the Plaza Athénée, before leaving France to work in Africa. He worked in the restaurant of Mansour de Casablanca (in Morocco), L'Oasis (in Algeria) and in Kenya. Back in Europe, he worked in the restaurants of Hôtel de Paris Monte-Carlo (in Monaco) and Le Club de Cavalière (in Le Lavandou, France).

He was a keen collector of art and was friends with artists such as César Baldaccini, Arman and Théo Tobiasse, who exhibited their work in his restaurant.

Vergé died of complications from diabetes on 5 June 2015, aged 85.

== Cooking style ==
Vergé was known for his contemporary cooking style, often named cuisine du soleil, a variation of Provençal cuisine. Together with Paul Bocuse, Gaston Lenôtre (1920–2009) and others, he is credited with inventing nouvelle cuisine, although Bocuse says that the term was invented by Henri Gault. The focus of Vergé's cooking style was on fresh, local ingredients, in a departure from traditional cuisine classique.

"The 'cuisine heureuse' is the antithesis of cooking to impress — rich and pretentious", he wrote in the preface to his first cookbook, Cuisine of the Sun. "It is a lighthearted, healthy and natural way of cooking which combines the products of the earth like a bouquet of wild flowers from the garden."

To promote his cooking style, he founded l'École de Cuisine du Soleil Roger Vergé (located on the first floor of l'Amandier in Mougins).

Vergé denounced the extremes of the nouvelle cuisine movement. "It is a joke," he stated to Nation's Restaurant News in 1985. "It is nothing serious. Now it looks Japanese: large dishes, small portions, no taste, but very expensive."

== Restaurants and other business ventures ==
Vergé opened his famous Moulin de Mougins in 1969 with his wife Denise. Celebrated as one of France's most prominent restaurants, a troop of future culinary stars trained there, such as Alain Ducasse, David Bouley and Daniel Boulud. The restaurant's location near Cannes enabled celebrity guests to arrive from the film festival.

In 1977 he opened another restaurant in the historic heart of the village of Mougins: L'Amandier de Mougins which focused more on cuisine Niçoise.

In 1982, he opened Les Chefs de France in the France Pavilion at Walt Disney World's Epcot Center together with Paul Bocuse and Gaston Lenôtre. At the time of opening, the pavilion contained two restaurants: Les Chefs de France and Le Bistro de Paris (now called Monsieur Paul). He also opened a restaurant in Rockefeller Center, Medi, in 2001, but departed after less than a year.

In 2003, Vergé retired from the business of cooking. He turned his flagship restaurant, Le Moulin de Mougins, over to fellow French chef Alain Llorca.

In 2004, Vergé appeared in the documentary film Monet's Palate airing through American Public Television with Meryl Streep, Alice Waters, Daniel Boulud and Michel Richard.

== Awards ==
Vergé was awarded a Michelin star for Moulin de Mougins three times in 1970, 1972, and 1974 (three star). In 1972, he was made Meilleur Ouvrier de France in the category Métier de bouche. In 1987, he was made Chevalier of the Legion of Honor and Maître Cuisinier de France. The first edition of the International Gastronomy Festival of Mougins, also known as Les Étoiles de Mougins, was dedicated to Vergé in September 2006.

== Books ==
Vergé wrote several books on food preparation. Most famous among them is Ma Cuisine du Soleil (1978), translated as Cuisine of the Sun. However, Vergé also wrote another series of books, the titles of which are probably a word play on Lettres de mon moulin by Alphonse Daudet:

- Ma cuisine du soleil (1978) published as Cuisine of the South of France.
- Les Fêtes de Mon Moulin (1993) published as Entertaining in the French Style in English.
- Les Légumes de Mon Moulin (1994), translated as Roger Vergé's Vegetables in the French Style.
- Les Tables de Mon Moulin (1998) published as New Entertaining in the French Style in English.
- Les Fruits de Mon Moulin (1999), translated as Roger Vergé's Cooking with Fruit.
