= Thierry Laborde =

French chef

Thierry Laborde is a French, Michelin-starred chef, working in London.

== Early life ==
Laborde was brought up in southwest France, in Maylis. He decided to become a chef while in secondary school.

== Training and subsequent employment ==
Laborde completed his formal training with the world-famous Ecole Les Rocailles, Biarritz and subsequently worked with several acclaimed chefs. These included Alain Ducasse, at Michelin three-star Restaurant Le Louis XV, Place du Casino, Monte Carlo.

Laborde came to the UK when he was head hunted by Brian Turner. His mentor was Albert Roux, under whom he became Head Chef at Le Gavroche at the age of 27.

Laborde gained his Michelin Star in 2004 at London's L’Oranger Restaurant in St James's Street. He subsequently became head chef at The Wallace Collection, featured in The Independent Magazine 'Best Restaurants of the Year' and The Times (AA Gill). He has a reputation amongst London's food critics for combining his passion for French food with an understanding of British restaurant culture.
