= Alain Ducasse at The Dorchester =

Restaurant in London, England

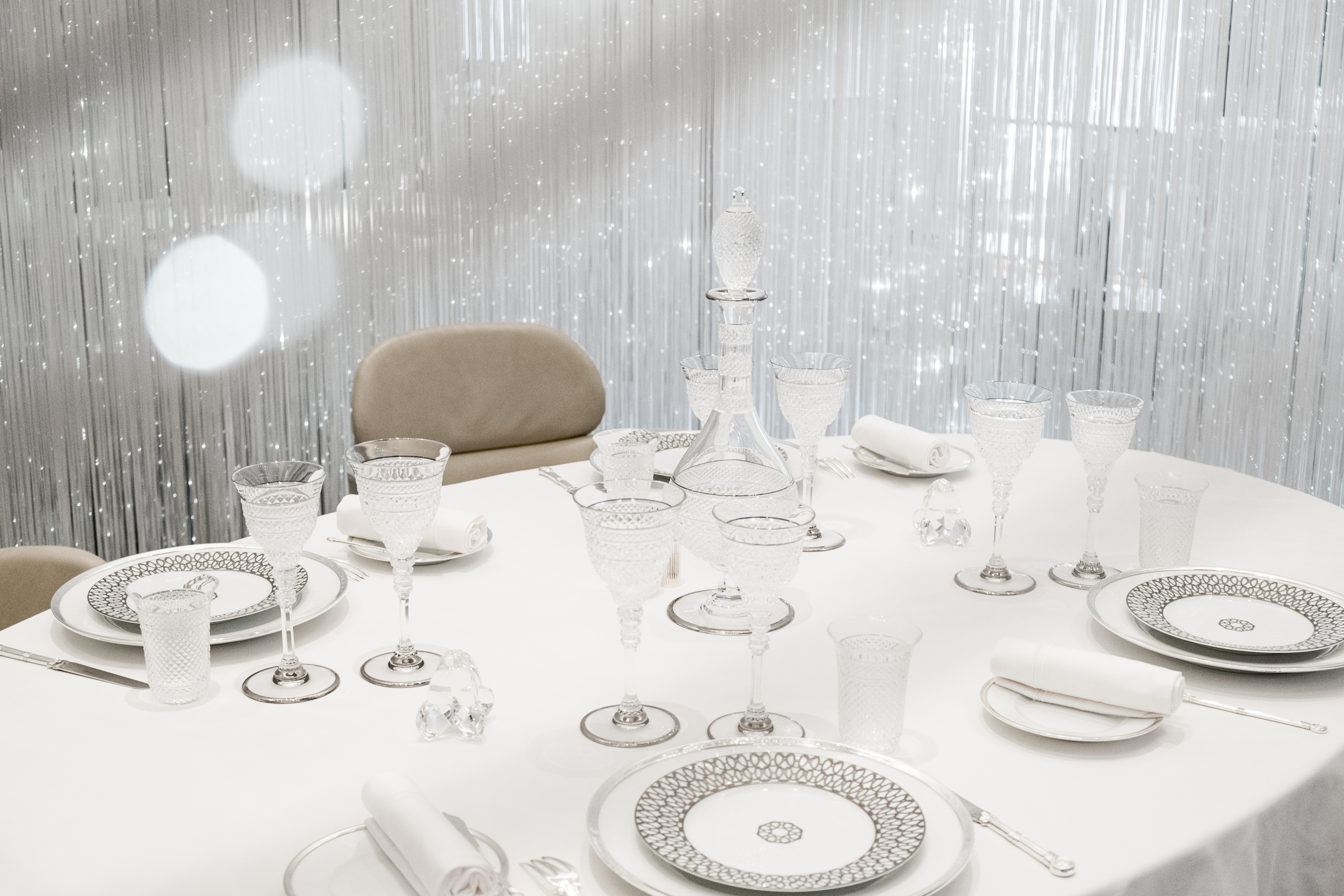
- The Table Lumière

- Location of The Dorchester hotel

Restaurant information
- Established: 2007; 19 years ago
- Head chef: Jean-Philippe Blondet
- Chef: Alain Ducasse
- Food type: Haute cuisine
- Dress code: Smart-casual
- Rating: (Michelin Guide); AA Rosettes (2026)
- Location: The Dorchester; Park Lane, London, W1, United Kingdom
- Coordinates: 51°30′26″N 00°09′09″W
- Seating capacity: 82
- Other information: Nearest stations: Green Park; Hyde Park Corner
- Website: www.alainducasse-dorchester.com

Alain Ducasse at The Dorchester is a restaurant located in The Dorchester, Park Lane, London which is part of The Dorchester Collection. It is one of over 25 restaurants operated by French-born chef Alain Ducasse. As of 2022, the executive chef of the restaurant is Jean-Philippe Blondet, who succeeded Chef Jocelyn Herland. Opened in November 2007, it was awarded three Michelin stars in 2010.

== Description ==
At the time of opening, Alain Ducasse at The Dorchester was intended to have "the modernity of Beige in Tokyo, the seriousness of Le Plaza Athénée in Paris and the flavours of Le Louis XV in Monaco."

The Executive Chef was originally intended to be Nicola Canuti, but Canuti was replaced before opening by Jocelyn Herland. Designed by Patrick Jouin and his partner, Sanjit Manku, the restaurant is inspired by British traditions. The tables feature ceramic vegetables as centrepieces, handmade butter dishes in pink marble, and Porthault linen tablecloths.

=== Menu ===
The restaurant serves contemporary French cuisine using seasonal French and British ingredients.

== Reception ==
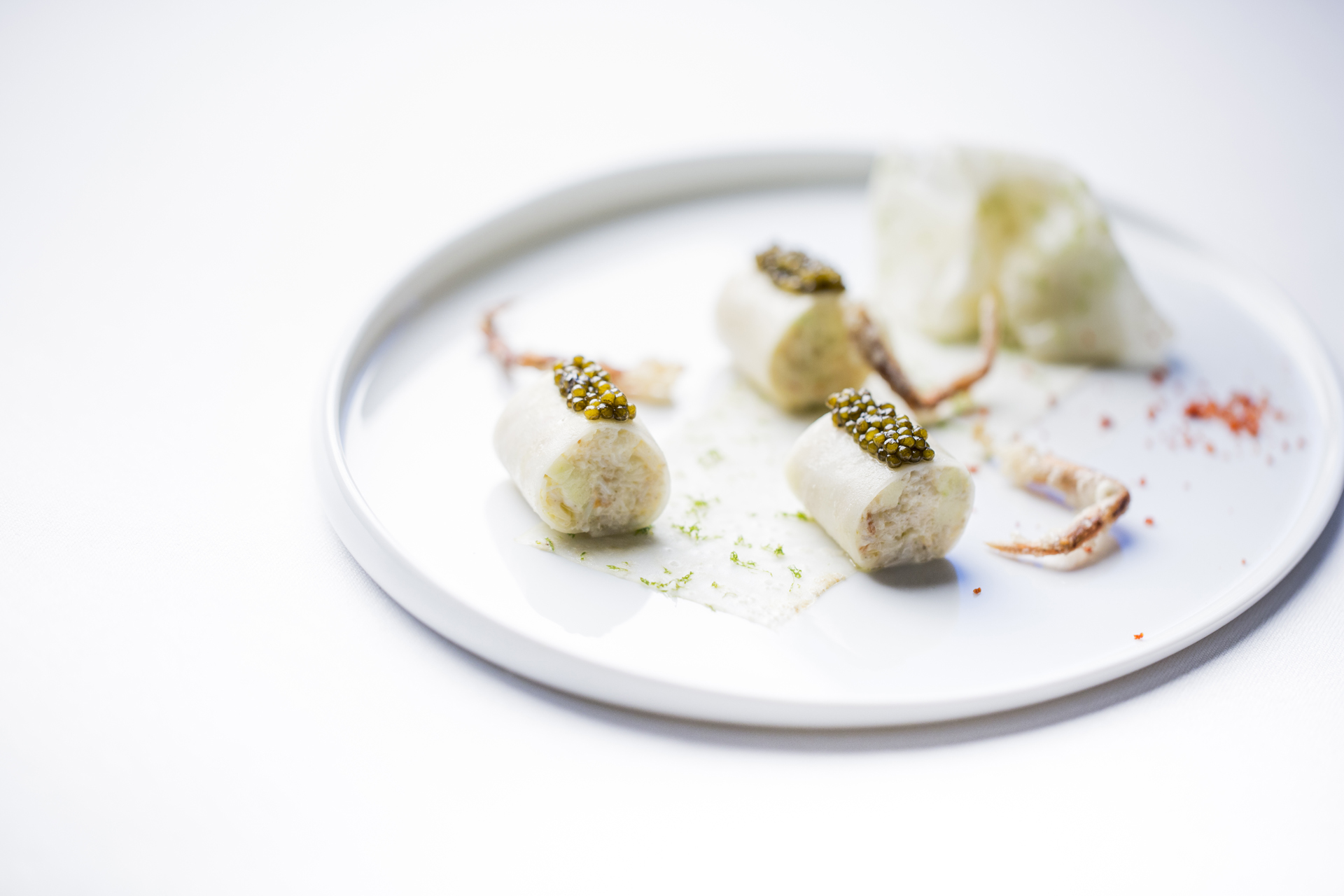
Dorset Crab, celeriac and caviar

Mark Palmer visited the restaurant shortly after opening for The Daily Telegraph. An overall rating of 8 out of 10 was given. Terry Durack of The Independent wrote that some of the dishes on offer at the opening were unbalanced, but that he admired the craftsmanship of the dishes. He gave it 16 out of 20, indicating that it was "capable of greatness".

Matthew Norman reviewed the restaurant for The Guardian after it received its third Michelin star. While he praised the attentive staff and the quality of the food, he directly compared it to several two-star restaurants he had previously reviewed and had trouble identifying the difference between the general quality of two star and three-star restaurants. He suggested that it may be due to the impact of Alain Ducasse himself. Food critics from Time Out reviewed the restaurant's express lunch menu in 2011, giving it four out of five stars.

In 2009, the restaurant appeared in the Michelin Guide for the first time, appearing directly with two stars, and was named a Michelin rising star. The following year, this was increased to three Michelin stars, making the restaurant only the fourth UK-based three-Michelin star restaurant following The Waterside Inn, The Fat Duck, and Restaurant Gordon Ramsay. As of 2017, it is one of five UK-based three-Michelin-starred restaurants in the 2018 Michelin Guide published in October 2017.

== See also ==
- List of French restaurants
- List of Michelin 3-star restaurants in the United Kingdom
