= Hôtel de Ville, Le Cannet =

Town hall in Le Cannet, France

Hôtel de Ville
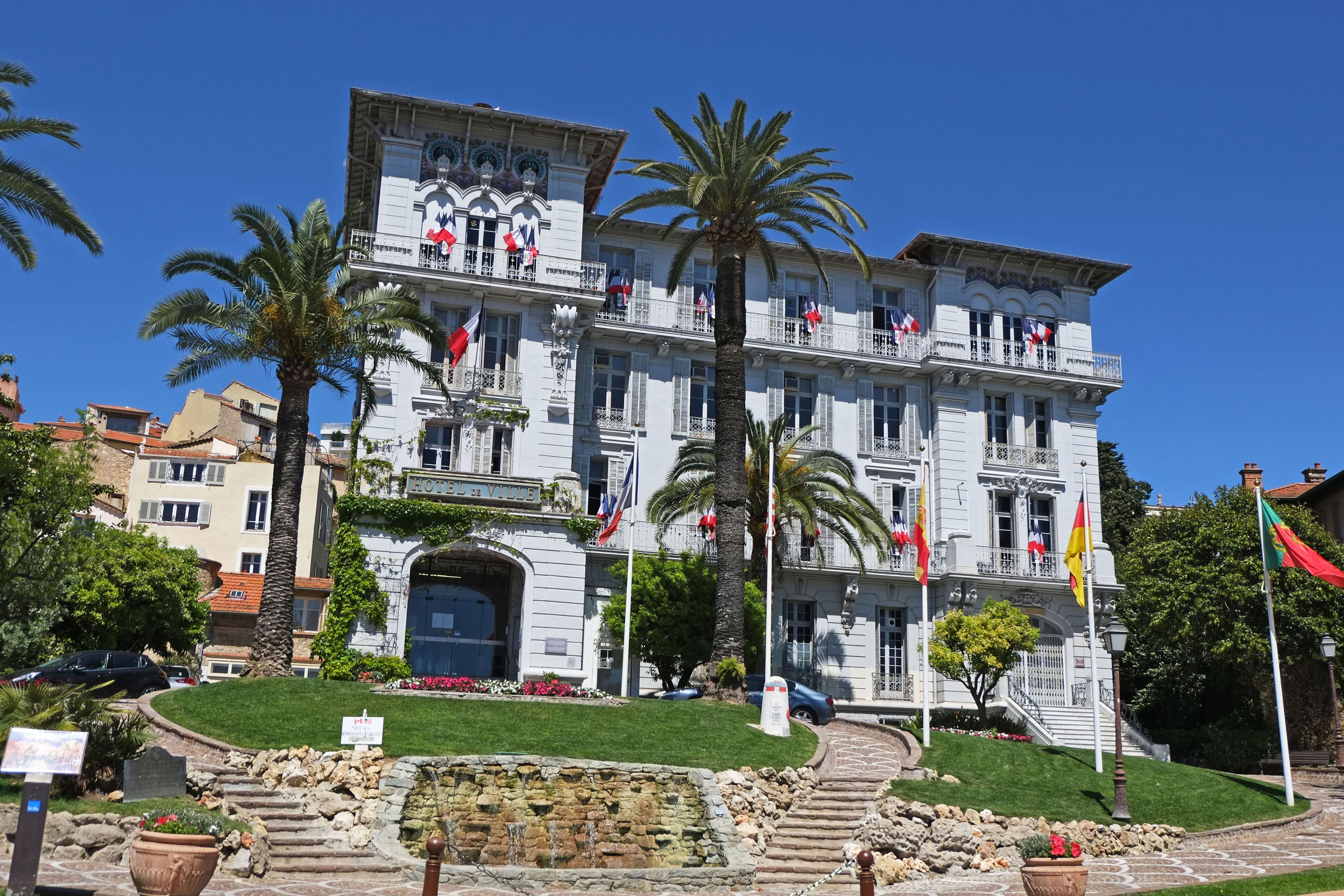
- The main frontage of the Hôtel de Ville in April 2014
- Interactive map of the Hôtel de Ville area

General information
- Type: City hall
- Architectural style: Mediterranean style
- Location: Le Cannet, France
- Coordinates: 43.5766°N 7.0191°E
- Completed: 1902

Design and construction
- Architect: James Warnery

The Hôtel de Ville (French pronunciation: [otɛl də vil], City Hall) is a municipal building in Le Cannet, Alpes-Maritimes, in southeastern France, standing on Boulevard Sadi Carnot.

== History ==
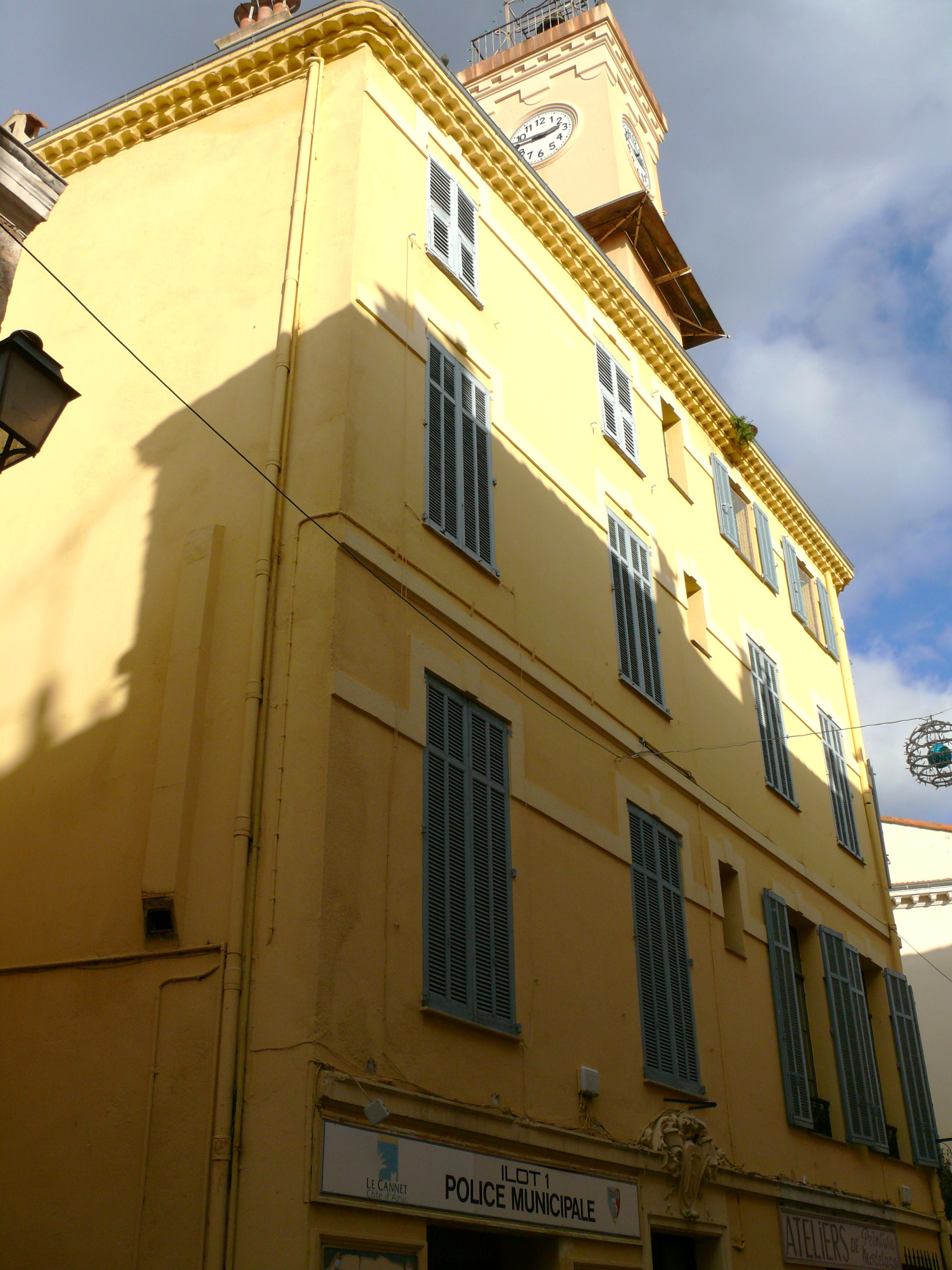
The old town hall

After the French Revolution, the new town council decided to establish a new town hall. The site they selected was on the north side of Rue Saint-Sauveur in the old part of the town. The design involved a symmetrical main frontage of four bays facing onto Rue Saint-Sauveur. On the ground floor, the two central bays contained doorways while the other bays contained casement windows with iron grills. The three upper floors were all fenestrated with windows with shutters and, at roof level, the council installed a square bell tower with a clock. In the 19th century, the clock was rung every half hour to regulate the allocation of water to workers in the fields. A system to detect earthquakes was also installed and the bell was also rung to alert local people of seismic disturbances.

In the early 1930s, after the old town hall became cramped, the council led by the mayor, Maurice Jean-Pierre, decided to acquire a new town hall. The building they selected was Hôtel Désanges on what is now Boulevard Sadi Carnot. The building was commissioned by a property developer, Victor Joachim Gassier, who made his money in Mexico. Gassier acquired the site from Société Foncière Lyonnaise, which had acquired a vast tract of land with a view to expanding the town to the south. The new building was designed by James Warnery in the Mediterranean style, built in ashlar stone and was completed in 1902. The building was erected on a slope giving good views towards the Mediterranean Sea. The area in front of the building was later landscaped to form a small garden.

The design of the building involved a symmetrical main frontage of six bays facing onto Boulevard Sadi Carnot with the end bays slightly projected forward and upwards. The central section was fenestrated with round headed windows with keystones on the ground floor, and with casement windows with shutters on the upper three floors. The outer bays contained a porte-cochère on the left and a segmental headed opening on the right: there were pairs of casement windows of the first and second floors, and tripartite rounded headed windows with moulded surrounds on the third floor. At roof level, there was a was a modillioned cornice above the central section and entablatures surmounted by prominent eaves above the end bays. The building was acquired by the town council in July 1933. The conversion works involved the creation of a Salle des Mariages (wedding room) which was decorated with five paintings by the Italian Renaissance painter, Giovanni Bellini.

The amateur boxer, Francois Bottero, who became national amateur boxing champion in 1942, attended a reception at the town hall in 1943.
