= Roussillon (restaurant) =

Coordinates: 51.49035°N 0.15214°W

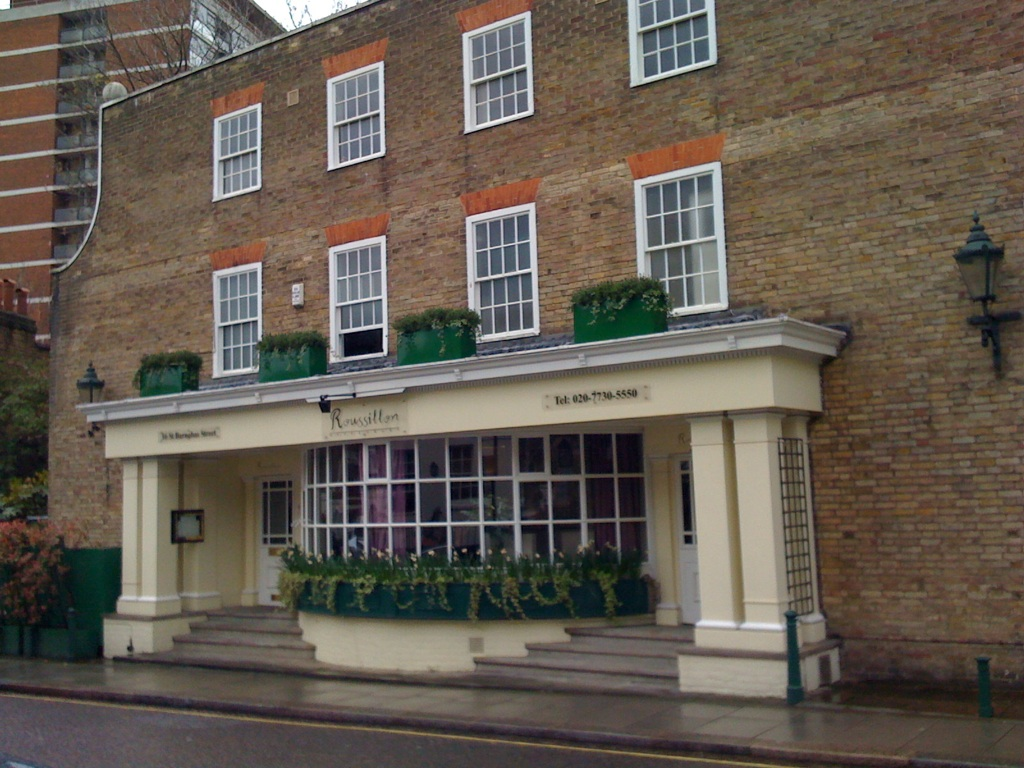

Restaurant information
- Established: 1997
- Location: London, United Kingdom

Roussillon was a restaurant on 16 St Barnabas Street in the Pimlico district of London. It held a Michelin star from 2000 until 2011. The restaurant's name comes from the village in the Lubéron rather than the Catalan region.

As of June 2012 the restaurant has ceased trading.

The restaurant was named by Chef Alexis Gauthier after acquiring it in 1997 in partnership with James Palmer and his brother Andrew, who had made their money from the New Covent Garden Soup Company. It had previously been named Marabel's, but new ownership, combined with the confusion of Marco Pierre White's new restaurant Mirabelle's, opening in the same week, prompted the name change. Roussillon has held its Michelin star since 2000.

The restaurant offers a blend of French cuisine with British seasonal vegetables. Favourite dishes include Blue Bembridge Lobster, Colchester Oysters, wild rabbit from the North Downs and Scottish venison. The herbs and vegetables are freshly picked each morning in Surrey.

It was the first restaurant to introduce a "garden" menu degustation for vegetarians, which made the news for its 5–course Flower Menu of petals and floral essences coinciding with the Chelsea Flower Show. In 2005, Roussillon dropped chicken from the menu in response to the 2005 bird flu outbreak.

Roussillon was the first restaurant ever reviewed by Giles Coren, in Tatler magazine.

Chefs who have worked in the kitchen of Roussillon include Frederic Chabbert of Petrus, Kuala Lumpur, Chatree Kachornklin of La Table de Tee in Bangkok, and Alexis Gauthier. Gauthier is due to launch a new restaurant at Lindsay House with Roberto Della Pietra, the previous head sommelier at Roussillon. Gauthier will retain his share of ownership in Roussillon.

Roussillon's residence itself was previously built after World War II bombing.

== See also ==
- List of French restaurants
