= Mougins =

Commune in Provence-Alpes-Côte d'Azur, France

Mougins Mogins (Occitan)
- Commune
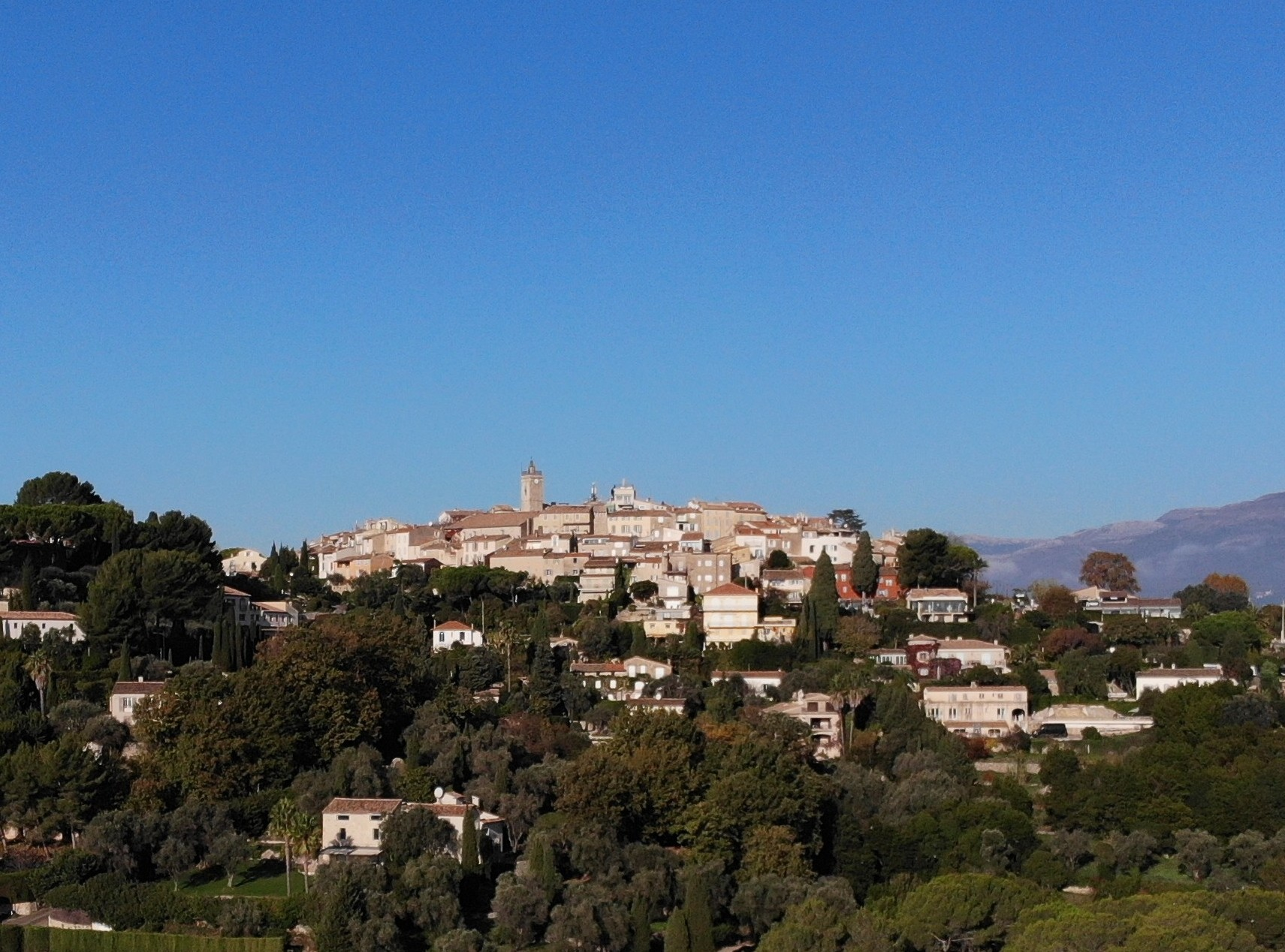
- A view of the town of Mougins

- Coat of arms
- Location of Mougins
- Location within France Location within Provence-Alpes-Côte d'Azur
- Coordinates: 43°36′03″N 6°59′44″E
- Country: France
- Region: Provence-Alpes-Côte d'Azur
- Department: Alpes-Maritimes
- Arrondissement: Grasse
- Canton: Le Cannet
- Intercommunality: CA Cannes Pays de Lérins

Government
  - Mayor (2026–32): Christophe Ulivieri
- Area^{1}: 25.64 km^{2} (9.90 sq mi)
- Highest elevation: 269 m (883 ft)
- Lowest elevation: 32 m (105 ft)
- Population (2023): 19,782
  - Density: 771.5/km^{2} (1,998/sq mi)
- Time zone: UTC+01:00 (CET)
  - Summer (DST): UTC+02:00 (CEST)
- INSEE/Postal code: 06085 /06250
- ^{1} French Land Register data, which excludes lakes, ponds, glaciers > 1 km^{2} (0.386 sq mi or 247 acres) and river estuaries.

Mougins (French pronunciation: [muʒɛ̃]; Occitan: Mogins [muˈʒis]; Latin: Muginum [muːˈɡiːnũː]) is a commune in the Alpes-Maritimes department in the region of Provence-Alpes-Côte d'Azur, Southeastern France.

It is located on the heights of Cannes, in the arrondissement of Grasse. Mougins is a 15-minute drive from Cannes. The town is surrounded by forests, most notably the Valmasque forest. In the town there are pines, olives and cypress trees.

== History ==
The hilltop of Mougins has been occupied since the pre-Roman period. Ancient Ligurian tribes who inhabited the coastal area between Provence and Tuscany, were eventually absorbed into the spread of the Roman Empire and then became part of an official Ligurian state that was created by Emperor Augustus (X Regio). On the Aurelia way linking from Rome to Arles, Muginum came into being during the 1st century BC.

In 1056, Gillaume de Gauceron, the Count of Antibes, gave the Mougins hillside to the Monks of Saint Honorat (from the nearby Îles de Lerins just off the coast of Cannes) who continued to administer the village, and until the eve of the French Revolution in 1789 its history matched that of the abbey. The former monks' court house, a vaulted room that is now called the "Salle des Moines" ("The Monk's Hall") was located on the first floor of the restaurant L'Amandier.

Built 260 m up at the top of the peak, the village was fortified in the Middle Ages. Its spiral form, its ramparts and its three gates, of which only the Porte Sarrazine (Sarrazine Gate) still exists today, gave this fiefdom a strategic position despite the many wartime attacks over the course of its history. The village grew outside its old fortifications, while still adhering to the circular structure of the ramparts.

During the 18th-century War of the Austrian Succession, the village was plundered by the Austro-Sardinian armies and damaged by fire. Following this, some of the ramparts were deconstructed and several new little streets of early 19th-century houses were built.

Commandant Amédée-François Lamy was born in Mougins in February 1858, and died at the Battle of Kousséri in Chad in April 1900. Fort-Lamy in Chad was named after him, but was renamed N'Djamena in 1973. The main 'Place' in the village is named after Commandant Lamy and the back-street village house that he was born in has a plaque to show where he lived.

The exile Volodymyr Vynnychenko, former Prime Minister of Ukraine, lived in Mougins from 1934 until his death in 1951.

In 1924, the surrealist painter Francis Picabia built his home in Mougins. His friends followed, and in turn set up home in Mougins: Fernand Léger, Paul Éluard, Robert Desnos, Jean Cocteau, Isadora Duncan, Man Ray and Pablo Picasso. Pablo Picasso spent the last 12 years of his life living in Mougins (1961–1973), where he died and lived in a 'mas' (farmhouse) at Notre-Dame-de-Vie, which is a small hilltop just beside the old village of Mougins and next to the 12th-century chapel of the same name. Picasso's studio was in the old village in a building that is now the tourist office, while the studio of Fernand Léger was above what is now the village wine shop, next to the rear of the Mougins Museum of Classical Art (MACM).

Sir Winston Churchill liked to sit in the middle of nature in front of the Notre-Dame-de-Vie chapel to write, very close to his neighbour Pablo Picasso. Arman, Elizabeth von Arnim, Yves Klein, César Baldaccini Yves Saint Laurent, Christian Dior, Catherine Deneuve, Édith Piaf, Jacques Brel, were other artists who drew their artistic inspiration from Mougins in the 20th century.

Mougins has a strong culinary history with such great chefs as Roger Vergé and Alain Ducasse having managed restaurants in the village. Given its close proximity to Cannes, Mougins is also often a tourist destination for Hollywood actors during the Cannes Film Festival. Elizabeth Taylor hosted the 'amfAR' AIDS Charity dinner for the Hollywood elite for almost 10 years until 2008.

== Gastronomy ==
Mougins has an important culinary history, with chef Roger Vergé having owned two restaurants in the village: L'Amandier and Le Moulin de Mougins. In 1969, Vergé came to Mougins. He invented the “Cuisine du Soleil” (Sunshine Cuisine) that he introduced across the globe, contributing to the growing reputation of French cuisine. He was awarded 5 stars by the Michelin Guide for his two restaurants. Vergé owned L'Amandier for over twenty years, while also training Alain Ducasse, who worked for him in Mougins from 1977-1981 and ultimately worked as a chef there.

In order to pay homage to Vergé, in 2006, the Mayor of Mougins, Richard Galy, decided to create the very first International Gastronomy Festival, the 'Les Étoiles de Mougins'. Since 2012, Mougins has been the only town in France to be awarded the “Ville et Métier d’Art” label for gastronomy.

== Cultural facilities ==
=== Mougins Museum of Classical Art ===
The Musée d’Art Classique de Mougins, also known as MACM, is the Mougins Museum of Classical Art. The museum displays within the same space ancient, neoclassical, modern, and contemporary art in order to highlight the influence of the ancient world on influential artists from Sir Peter Paul Rubens to Damien Hirst. Located at the entrance of the village of Mougins, the private museum holds a collection of over 800 works over four floors. The MACM focuses on the reciprocal influences of the ancient civilisations of Egypt, Rome, and Greece, and the continuity of the Graeco-Roman legacy through to the present. Its collection includes artefacts from ancient Egypt, Greece and Rome, as well as drawings, paintings, and sculptures by Paul Cézanne, Marc Chagall, Pablo Picasso, Auguste Renoir, Jean Cocteau, Salvador Dalí, Raoul Dufy, Antony Gormley, Keith Haring, Damien Hirst, Henri Matisse, Henry Moore, Francis Picabia, Marc Quinn, Auguste Rodin, and Henri Toulouse-Lautrec.

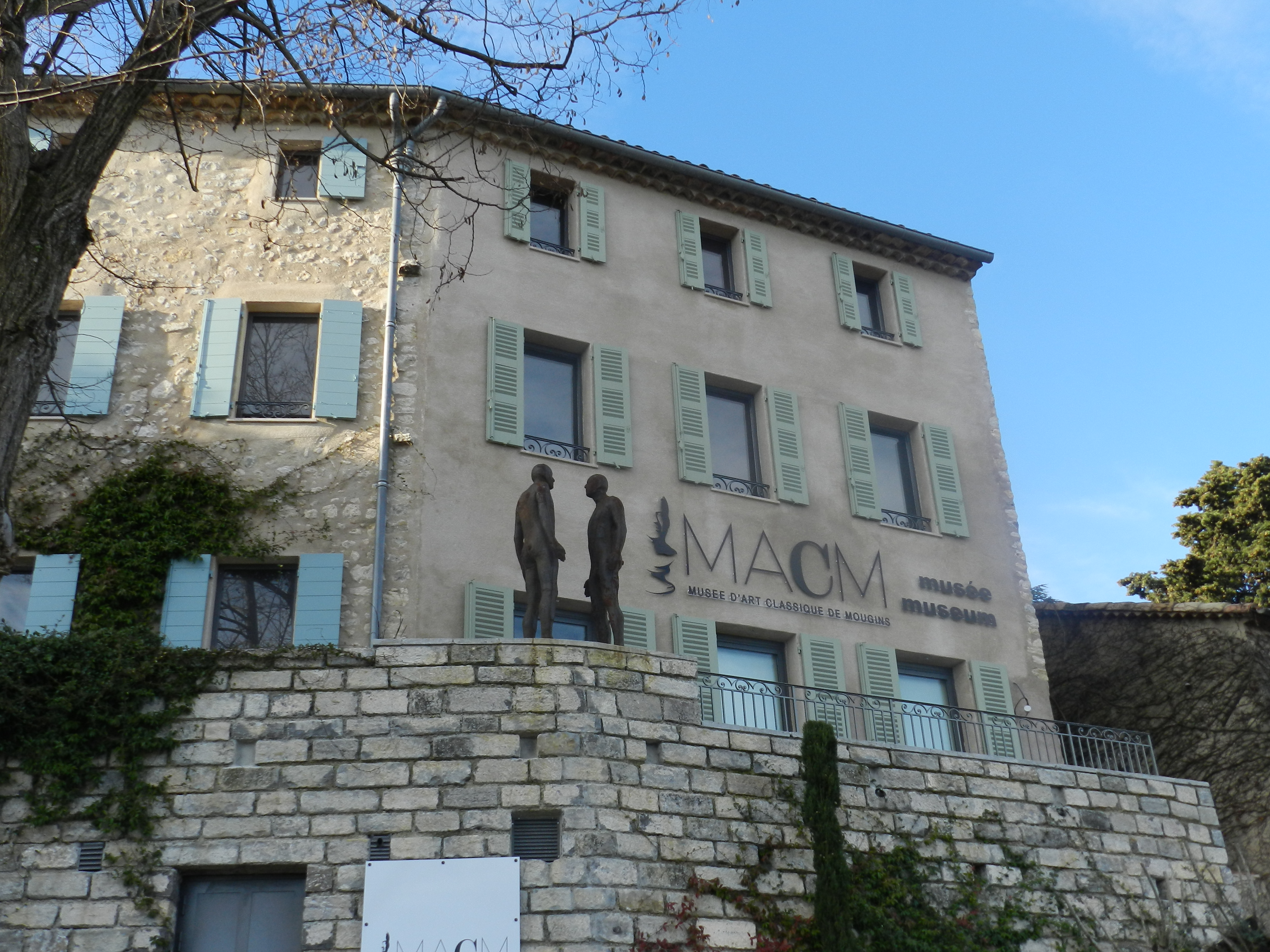
Museum's Facade

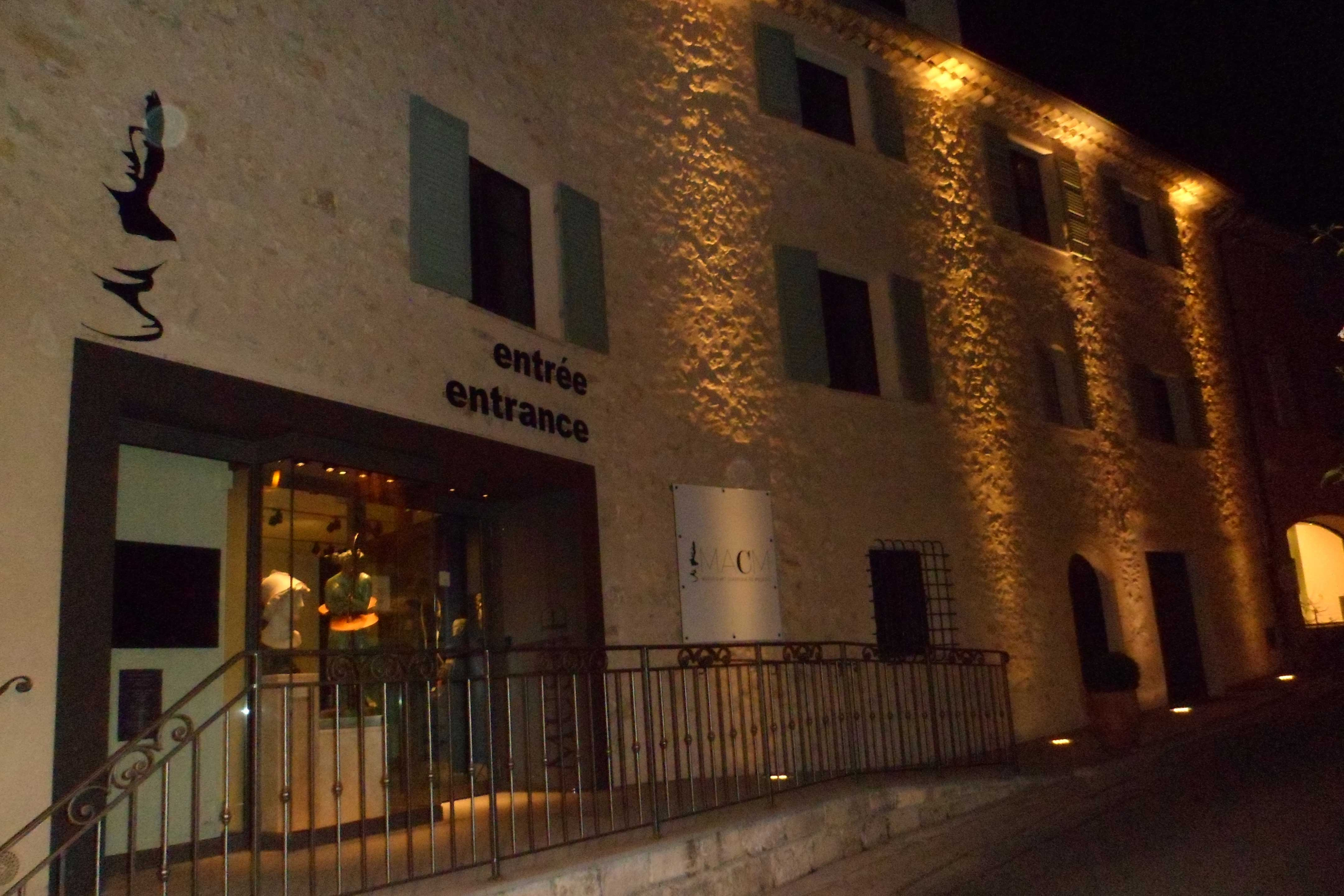
MACM by Night

=== Mougins Photography Centre ===
Located in the center of an old village, in an old rehabilitated presbytery, the Mougins Photography Centre aims to highlight the many trends in contemporary photography.

=== Le Lavoir (Wash house) ===
Built in 1894, this historic place houses temporary exhibitions throughout the year.

=== Cultural centre ===
Located above the town hall's marriage registration office, it houses temporary exhibitions and a series of unreleased photos of Pablo Picasso, taken during this everyday life at Notre-Dame-de-Vie.

=== Performing arts ===
In 2017, the "Scène 55" cultural space was opened to host concerts, theatre and puppet theatre shows, and artistic workshops. In summer, the "Festival Notre-Dame-de-Vie" hosts a festival of classical music in the setting of the eponymous chapel. In the village, the Organ Festival takes places every year in the church of Saint-Jaques-le-Majeur and the open-air exhibition "Mougins Monumental" brings unusual and large sculptures to the village.

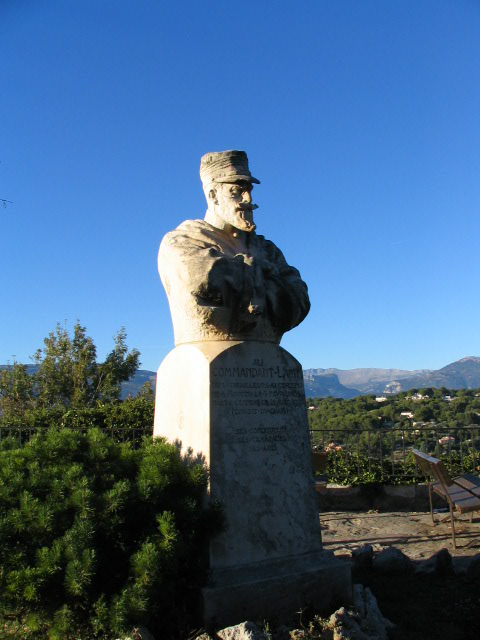
Memorial for Amédée-François Lamy

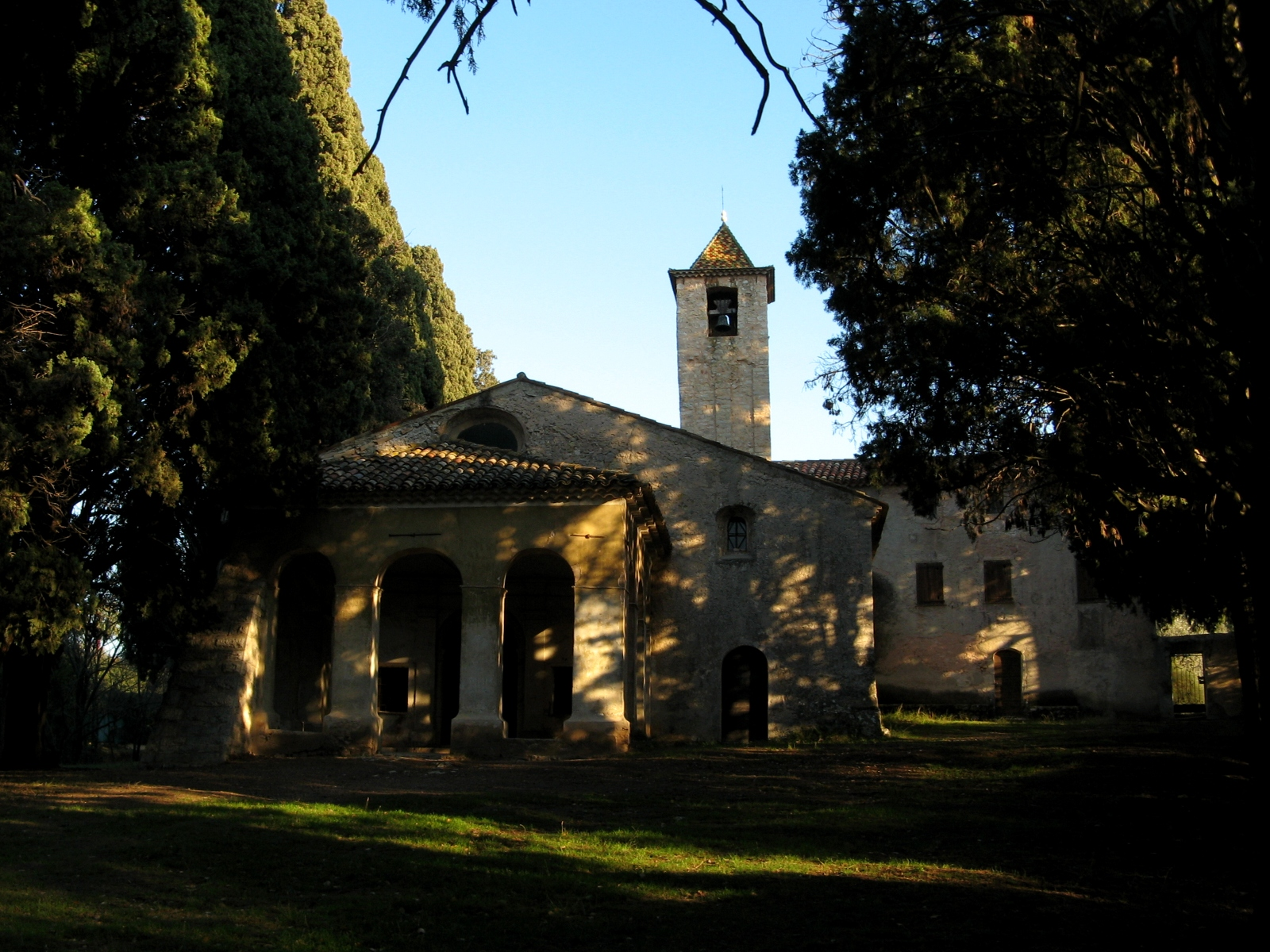
The Chapel of Our Lady of Life

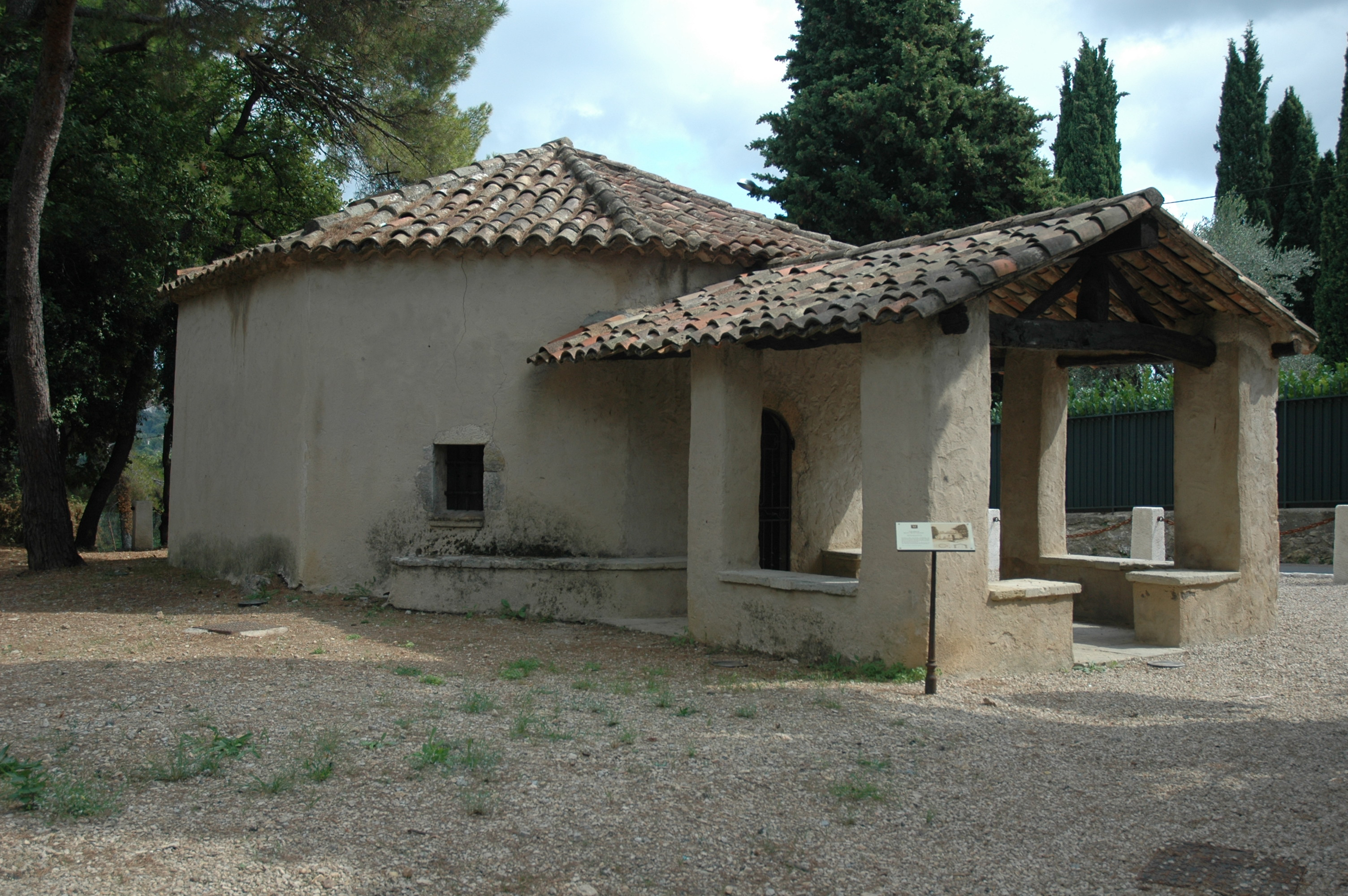
The Chapel of St. Bartholomew

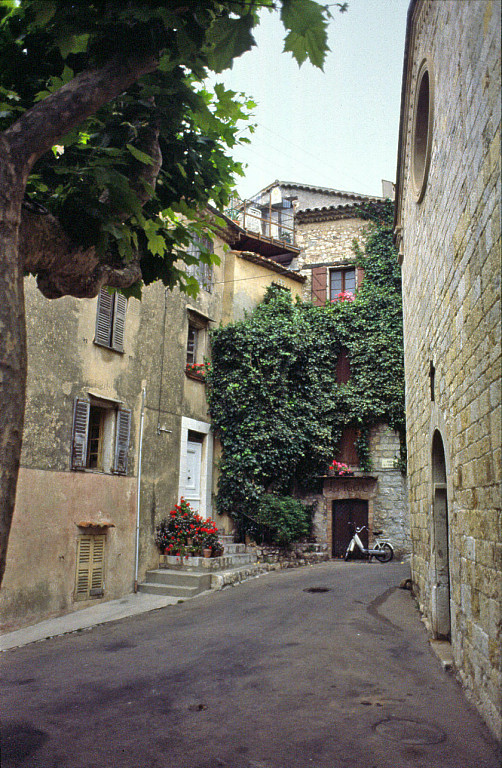
The Village Centre

== Demographics ==
Historical population

Year	Pop.	±% p.a.
1793	1,330	—
1821	1,724	+0.93%
1846	1,828	+0.23%
1872	1,652	−0.39%
1901	1,599	−0.11%
1926	2,800	+2.27%
1946	3,210	+0.69%
1962	5,274	+3.15%
1968	6,346	+3.13%

Year	Pop.	±% p.a.
1975	8,492	+4.25%
1982	10,197	+2.65%
1990	13,014	+3.10%
1999	16,051	+2.36%
2007	19,906	+2.73%
2012	17,884	−2.12%
2017	19,473	+1.72%
2023	19,782	+0.26%

Source: EHESS and INSEE (1968-2023)

== Economy ==
During the 19th and early 20th centuries, the village was a centre of floral production, producing lavender, roses and jasmine for the perfumeries in nearby Grasse. Mougins is a living village, where both the ancient buildings and the 19th-century houses are inhabited as they have always been.

== Education ==
Mougins School, the more commonly used name for the Mougins British International School international school has been in operation since it was established in 1964. There is an elementary school "les cabrieres" and a middle school "les campelieres".

== Mayors ==
Name	F. Tajasque	Lavabre-Delanoy	Jacques Sauvan	André Bailet	Georges Pellegrin	Roger Duhalde	Richard Galy
Period	1904–	1930–1941	1945–1961	1961–1970	1970–1977	1977–2001	2001–2024
Political party			Gaullist			RPR	UMP

== Twin towns ==
Mougins is twinned with:

- Aschheim, Germany
- Lerici, Italy

== See also ==
- Communes of the Alpes-Maritimes department
- Bernard Lancret
- Johann Michael Rottmayr
- Pablo Picasso
