= Canton of Le Cannet =

Coordinates: 43.58°N 7.02°E

- Canton
- Situation of the canton of Le Cannet in the department of Alpes-Maritimes
- Country: France
- Region: Provence-Alpes-Côte d'Azur
- Department: Alpes-Maritimes
- No. of communes: {{{nbcomm}}}
- Population (2023): 47,229
- INSEE code: 0609

The canton of Le Cannet is an administrative division of the Alpes-Maritimes department, southeastern France. Its borders were modified at the French canton reorganisation which came into effect in March 2015. Its seat is in Le Cannet.

It consists of the following communes:

1. Le Cannet (partly)
2. Mougins
