= Moulin de Mougins =

Restaurant in France

Coordinates: 43°35′46″N 7°00′05″E

The Moulin de Mougins is a celebrated restaurant in France, situated in a 16th-century mill (moulin) in the inland French Riviera town of Mougins. Founding chef Roger Vergé made the restaurant's name renowned with his novel and light Cuisine de Soleil. The Moulin is technically classified as an auberge or inn, as it has a couple of guest rooms.

As of 30 August 2009, the Moulin was rated four "knives and forks" in the Michelin Guide.

Following the retirement of Vergé, the Moulin was taken over by Alain Llorca, who had been head chef at the Michelin-starred Chantecler dining room in the Hotel Negresco in Nice.

In March 2009, Sébastien Chambru, who worked at the 'Restaurant Paul Bocuse' near Lyon, became the Chef des Cuisines at the Moulin.

In 1977, the famed French chef Alain Ducasse worked as an assistant at the Moulin de Mougins, where he learned the Provençal cooking methods for which he later became renowned.

In 2013, Sébastien Chambru left the restaurant. Chef Erwan Louaisil has taken over the kitchen, and it is now operating under his expert guidance.
