= Théo Tobiasse =

French painter and sculptor (1927-2012)

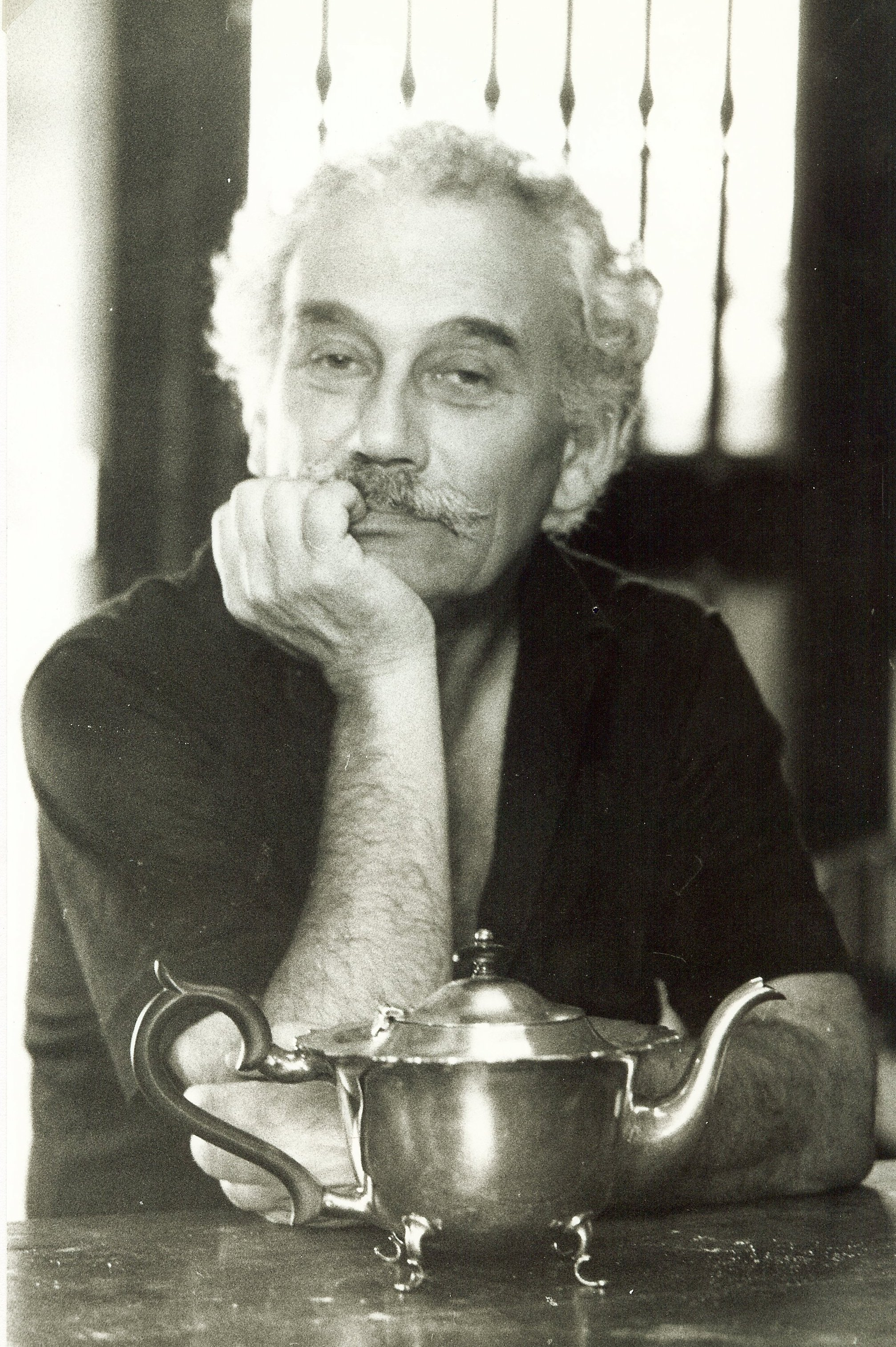
Théo Tobiasse

Théo Tobiasse born Tobias Eidesas (26 April 1927 – 3 November 2012) was a French painter, engraver, illustrator, and sculptor.

== Biography ==
=== Youth and family ===
Youngest son of Chaïm (Charles) Eidesas and Brocha (Berthe) Slonimsky from Kaunas in Lithuania, Théo Tobiasse was born in Jaffa in Mandatory Palestine in 1927, where his Jewish parents had lived since 1925. The family encountered material difficulties and decided to return to Lithuania, then left for Paris in 1931, where his typographer father found work in a Russian printing press.

Tobiasse showed early provisions for drawing and painting, and during a visit to the Specialized Exhibition of 1937 held in Paris, he was amazed by the Fairy Electricity by Raoul Dufy.

The death of his mother (in June 1939) was quickly followed by the outbreak of World War II. Life in Paris under the German Occupation, being required to wear of the yellow star, and having his registration at the National School of Decorative Arts refused for racial reasons turned his life upside down. He enrolled at a private course of commercial art of Boulevard Saint-Michel, but had to quit nine months later when his family, after narrowly escaping the roundup of the Velodrome d'Hiver in July 1942, was forced to hide in an apartment in Paris for two years. At the Liberation of Paris, he quickly started a career as an advertising graphic designer with the art printer Draeger, and also produced tapestry cartoons, theater sets and window displays for Hermès rue du Faubourg Saint-Honoré.

In 1950, he obtained French nationality and he moved to Nice in the Alpes-Maritimes, where he pursued his career as an advertising graphic designer.

=== Beginning painter 1960-1969 ===
His first canvases were exhibited at the Salon des Peintres du Sud-Est in 1960. He won the 1961 “prize for young Mediterranean painting” and Armand Drouant offered him a first contract and exhibited it at the Galerie du Faubourg Saint-Honoré in Paris in 1962.

Théo Tobiasse also won the Dorothy-Gould Prize in 1961. He then decided to devote himself solely to the visual arts. Many exhibitions are dedicated to him around the world, in Paris at the Drouant gallery, in Geneva, Montreal or Tokyo, then London, Zurich, Lauzanne, Los Angeles, Kyiv, and then a first solo exhibition in New York (1968). Self-taught, he studied the technique of the great masters in museums during his travels. The reliefs, glazes and colors of The Jewish Bride by Rembrandt at the Rijksmuseum of Amsterdam, in particular, opens up new technical possibilities he explores in his paintings back to his workshop.

The figurative subjects without narration or symbolism (cat, bird, kite, velocipede, etc.) of his first paintings, allow him to experiment with the techniques, color and texture of oil and gouache painting, Le Vélocipède (1959), Le Chat de Vence (1961), L'Oiseau rouge (1964), The Night of the Bird (1960).

From 1964, Théo Tobiasse developed a more personal iconography drawn from his own memories of his childhood in Lithuania, the wanderings of a family looking for a land of asylum and the Shoah. The train, the one that takes his family from Kaunas to Paris, or the Jews to the camps, becomes a recurring motif, and memory a major theme in his work. It was in 42, the train of 16 July, oil on canvas, (1965).

=== 1970-1983 ===
A visit to Jerusalem in 1970 brought him closer to his Jewish origins. He created his first stained glass windows on the theme of “Jewish Holidays” for the Jewish Community Center in Nice and a monumental oil on canvas entitled Que tes tentes sont belles, ô Jacob (1982). He continues to travel and immerse himself in the cultures he meets, the jazz of New Orleans, Mexican archaeological sites and Native American totems. In New York, he met Elie Wiesel (1982). While Josy Eisenberg was directing a film about Théo Tobiasse, entitled Tell me who you paint, for French television in 1977, numerous personal exhibitions were devoted to him in France and abroad, in particular at the Passali gallery in Paris, the Musée de l'Athénée in Geneva and the Nahan Gallery in New Orleans. In 1983, a retrospective exhibition of his work was organized in Nice, at the Musée d'art contemporain de Ponchettes.

The carborundum etching, the lithography, the windows, the pottery, the sculpture are all expression that explores first tools in the workshop he had built at his home on the hills of Nice (1954 -1972), then at the Rauba Capeu quay in Nice (1971-1976). He left Nice to set up his main workshop on his property in Saint-Paul-de-Vence in 1976.

In collaboration with Pierre Chave, lithographer in Saint-Paul-de-Vence, Théo Tobiasse developed a technique for making lithographs from eighteen to twenty colors that he produced for many original editions published in France, Sweden and the States -Unis: Songs of Songs (1975), Paris, Fleur de Bitume, Hommage à HC Andersen (1980), Parfum d'Odalisque (1982). He was also introduced to carborundum engraving, an engraving technique developed by Henri Goetz for Let My People Go (1981).

To the theme of the memory of the wanderings and exoduses of his family and the Jewish people, three other major themes will be added to Tobiasse's personal iconography which will cross his work:

- the cities that are dear to him (Paris and Jerusalem, first, then New York and Venice from the 1980s); twenty eight monochrome gouaches, From Notre-Dame to Saint-Germain-des-Près (1969).
- the Bible, an inexhaustible source of human dramas, which he reimagines in the present and people of fanciful biblical mothers and other characters,
- the woman-lover, erotic and shameless, Daphnis and Chloé (1978), Portrait of a woman immobile in ecstasy, (1978), Sex apple, creature whose skin burns and arms twist (1980).

To explore the theme of the erotic woman, Tobiasse adopted drawing in graphite, Indian ink, and pastel on paper, as well as the writing of poetic texts that he inscribed in his drawings and notebooks, Tu m 'have made discover in you the shadows of flesh (1977) or forbidden charms: I can adore only in the vertigo of a sexual incantation ... (1979).

=== 1984-1997 ===
The American dealer, Kenneth Nahan Sr., met in 1978, encouraged Théo Tobiasse to join other French painters in the United States that he represented, notably Max Papart and James Coignard [ref. necessary] . Tobiasse moved to New York in 1984. He first worked at the Hotel Chelsea then set up his studio in Manhattan. He then decides to share his time and his work between Saint-Paul-de-Vence and New York.

The first paintings painted in America stand out from his European production by their scale and their luminous themes. The oil-painted canvases fill with portraits of family, children, and biblical figures, My family was from Lithuania (sic), Little Girl Sitting, Saul and David (1984). In these paintings, families no longer flee from pogroms on trains, but arrive in New York, a new host country according to his imagination, as in America (1984). It was also in New York that he created the sculpture Myriam, which would become the model for the Venus., a monumental bronze sculpture that will be installed at the entrance to Saint-Paul-de-Vence in 2007. New York joins the inspiring cities of Tobiasse and women now personify freedom.

Back in Saint-Paul-de-Vence, he experimented with new techniques from 1986. He abandoned oil painting and gouache for acrylic, which was less restrictive. His mixed techniques on paper or canvas mix collages, acrylic paint and oil pastels. It develops cut and painted wooden or steel panels for large formats and public orders, including:

- In 1987, two panels on the theme of freedom for the entrance to the Palais des Congrès in Nice;
- In 1989, a triptych altarpiece entitled La vie est une fête; five stained-glass windows, and a sculpture, L'Oiseau de lumière, for the Saint-Sauveur chapel in Cannet. This work sums up his quest for light and freedom.

In 1992, a retrospective exhibition of Théo Tobiasse's work was organized at the castle-museum of Cagnes-sur-Mer. His workshops become meeting places for artist friends such as Ben and Arman. Chaïm Potok visits Saint-Paul's studio on several occasions, devotes a monograph Tobiasse: Artist in Exile published in 1986 in New York, and there meets the writer James Baldwin, his friend and neighbor in 1987.

He travels a lot for his personal exhibitions. In 1987, Vision Nouvelle Japon exhibited his last paintings in Tokyo, Kokura, and Mito and then in 1991, large sculptures in cut and painted wood panels in Tokyo, Osaka, Nagoya, Kōbe, Fukuoka and Taipei. He discovered Prague in 1992 and returned there in 1995, and traveled to Venice every year to draw. Venicetherefore completes the quartet of cities inspiring him. During his travels, he filled notebooks with drawings, the first of which were reproduced in facsimiles in 1992 by the Éditions de la Difference, Les Venise de Tobiasse,' or Drawings and Writings.

Théo Tobiasse discovers the work of scenography with the creation of sets and costumes for the puppet theater. He created an album of lithographs for the fifth centenary of the expulsion of the Jews from Spain. The Garden of the Psalms, a suite of seven stained glass windows created in the workshop of master glassmaker Alain Peinado, is inaugurated at the Israelite community center on the Esplanade in Strasbourg on the occasion of the bicentenary of the emancipation of the Jews. He continued with the creation of twelve monumental stained glass windows entitled The Song of the Prophets for the synagogue of Nice which were inaugurated in 1993.

In 1994, he participated with other artists from the Nice region (Arman, Ben, Jean-Claude Farhi, Claude Gilli and Patrick Moya) in the creation of floats for the Nice Carnival, which this year has for theme "The king of the Arts ”, the exhibition of models of the floats at the Museum of Modern and Contemporary Art in Nice and the publication of a portfolio of lithographs on the theme of the carnival.

=== 1998-2012 ===
In 1999, he made a trip to Israel and revisited Jerusalem and Jaffa, the place of his birth, where he worked on graphic editions. In 2000, the Museum of Fine Arts, Palais Carnolès in Menton devoted a retrospective exhibition to him.

Appear in 2007, the facsimile of five sketchbooks / journals gathered in a box, Les Carnets de Saint-Paul-de-Vence, 1993-2001. In 2009, the book Cantique des cantiques calligraphy and illustrated by Théo Tobiasse was published with 36 plates dating from 1995.

== Tributes ==
On his death, he received tributes from the Minister of Culture, Aurélie Filippetti and from the deputy mayor of Nice, Christian Estrosi.

== Main works in public collections ==
- Fêtes Juives et une fresque, Que tes tentes sont belles, ô Jacob (1982), Centre Communautaire Juif de Nice (Michelet).
- Les Trains de terreur des bords de la folie (1983), huile sur toile, Simon Wiesenthal Center, Los Angeles, États-Unis.
- Sarah portant Isaac, retour du Mont-Moriah (1984), huile sur toile, Musée d'art moderne et d'art contemporain de Nice.
- La Liberté éclairant Saint-Paul-de-Vence et La Liberté éclairant les enfants de l'exil (1987), techniques mixte sur panneaux en bois stratifié, 400 × 290 cm chaque panneaux, Palais des congrès de Nice, France.
- Musée Tobiasse - Chapelle Saint-Sauveur (1989), mise en valeur de la Chapelle Saint-Sauveur sur le thème « La vie est une fête », comprenant une composition mural intérieure, des vitraux, une mosaïque extérieure en façade et une sculpture polychrome sur parvis Oiseau de lumière, Le Cannet, France.
- L'Enfant Fou (1990), sculpture fontaine monumentale en bronze, Centre des affaires Arénas, Nice, France.
- Le Jardin des psaumes (1991), sept vitraux pour la synagogue séfarade de l’Esplanade à Strasbourg, France.
- Décors et costumes de Pygmalion (1992) de George Bernard Shaw, pour la Compagnie Arketal, dans le cadre du Festival international de marionnettes, Cannes, France.
- Le Chant des prophètes (1993), vitraux de la Grande Synagogue de Nice, France.
- Venus de Saint-Paul-de-Vence (2008), sculpture en bronze, Saint-Paul-de-Vence, France.
- Firenze dans un chat (1964), oil on canvas, Vilnius, Lithuania
