= Le Louis XV (restaurant) =

Le Louis XV - Alain Ducasse à l'Hôtel de Paris
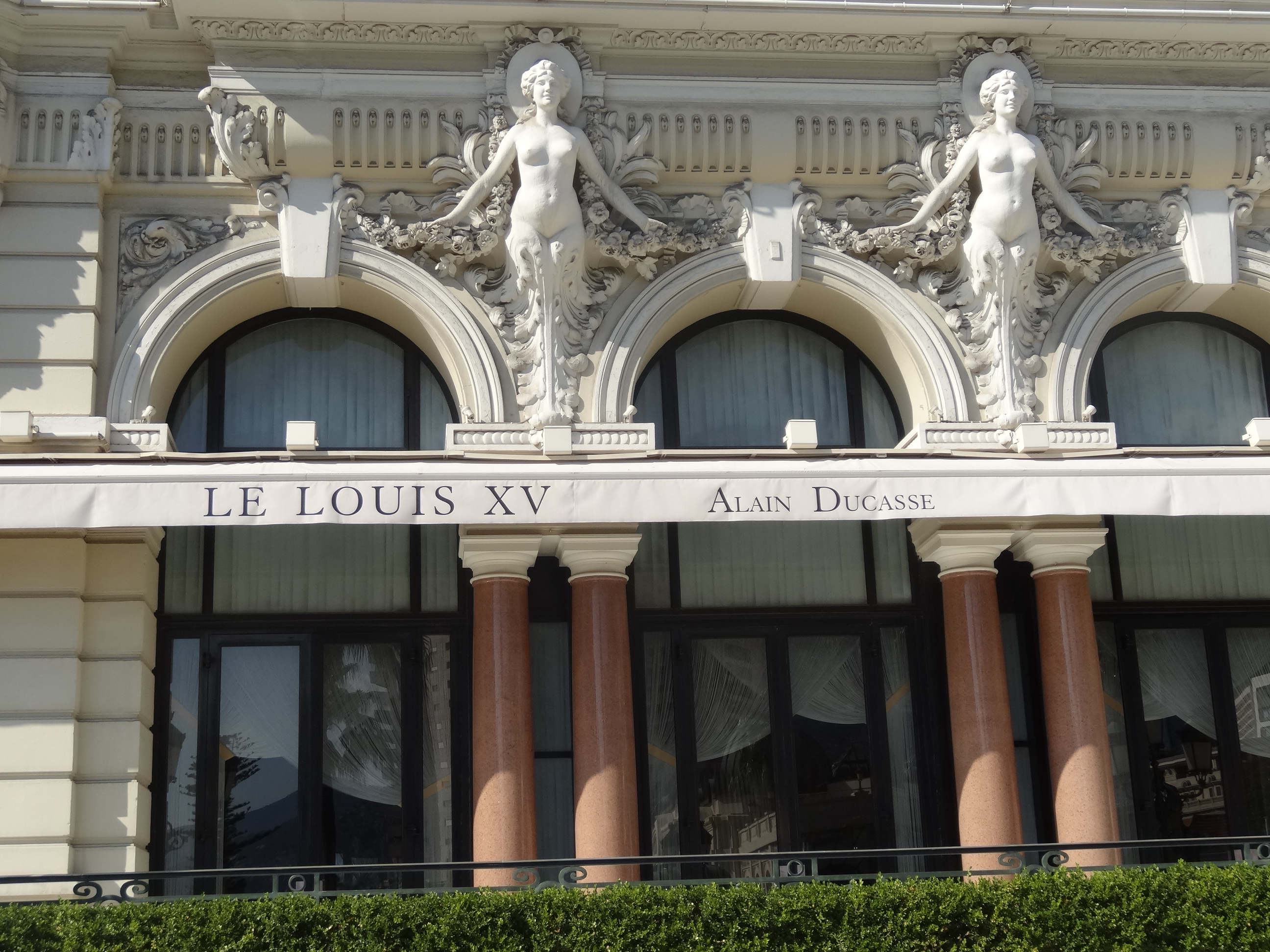
- Interactive map of Le Louis XV - Alain Ducasse à l'Hôtel de Paris

Restaurant information
- Established: May 22, 1987; 39 years ago
- Owner: Alain Ducasse
- Head chef: Dominique Lory (executive chef); Emmanuel Pilon (chef de cuisine)
- Food type: Haute cuisine
- Dress code: Jacket required
- Rating: (Michelin Guide)
- Location: Hôtel de Paris Monte-Carlo, Pl. du Casino, 98000, Monte Carlo, Monaco
- Coordinates: 43°44′19″N 07°25′37″E
- Reservations: Yes
- Website: montecarlosbm.com/...

Le Louis XV - Alain Ducasse à l'Hôtel de Paris is a French restaurant in Monte Carlo, Monaco. Run by the chef Alain Ducasse, it holds three Michelin stars. It has appeared in lists of the world's top restaurants.

== Description ==
Le Louis XV is Ducasse's flagship restaurant. It is located inside the Hôtel de Paris Monte-Carlo in Monte Carlo. He opened the restaurant in May 1987, having been challenged by Prince Rainier III of Monaco and the Société des bains de mer de Monaco to win three Michelin stars there within four years, becoming the first hotel-based restaurant to win that level of the award. Ducasse won the three stars for the restaurant 33 months later, some fifteen months earlier than his objective.

The wine cellar contains around 400,000 bottles of wine. A number of food trolleys are used by the waiters, including for champagne, cheese and one holding herbs to make herbal teas at the tableside.

Several chefs who went on to lead Michelin starred restaurants underwent training at Le Louis XV, including Helene Darroze, Alexis Gauthier, Massimo Bottura, Clare Smyth and Thierry Laborde.

== Reception ==
Le Louis XV first gained its three Michelin stars in 1990, holding for 7 consecutive years before losing one star in 1997. However, the restaurant quickly regained the lost third star just one year later, and yet lost it again in 2001. Eventually it regained the third star again 2 years later in 2003 and the restaurant has been holding three stars ever since.

Food critic Paolo Tullio described Le Louis XV as one of the "great French restaurants". In 2003, The Guardian identified it as one of the top five restaurants in the world. Howard Jacobson was sent to review it by the newspaper, who thought initially that the dishes served were "droll" but changed his mind when he tasted them. He enjoyed the ambiance of the place, and thought that the numbers of staff gave it an air of professionalism.

Fodor's travel guide described Ducasse's cuisine as "superb", while also describing the interior of the restaurant as "magnificent". It was included in the first published list of the world's 101 top restaurants by The Daily Meal in 2012.

It has also been included in The World's 50 Best Restaurants by Restaurant; in 2003 it was ranked the third-best restaurant in the world behind the French Laundry and El Bulli, by 2006 and 2007 it had dropped to eighth place, dropping to fifteenth in 2008. It had a significant drop in rankings in 2009, falling to 43rd place.

The restaurant has been the recipient of the Wine Spectator Grand Award since 1995.

== See also ==
- List of Michelin-starred restaurants in Monaco
- List of Michelin 3-star restaurants
