= John and Archibald Christian House =

Historic house in Alabama, United States

- U.S. National Register of Historic Places
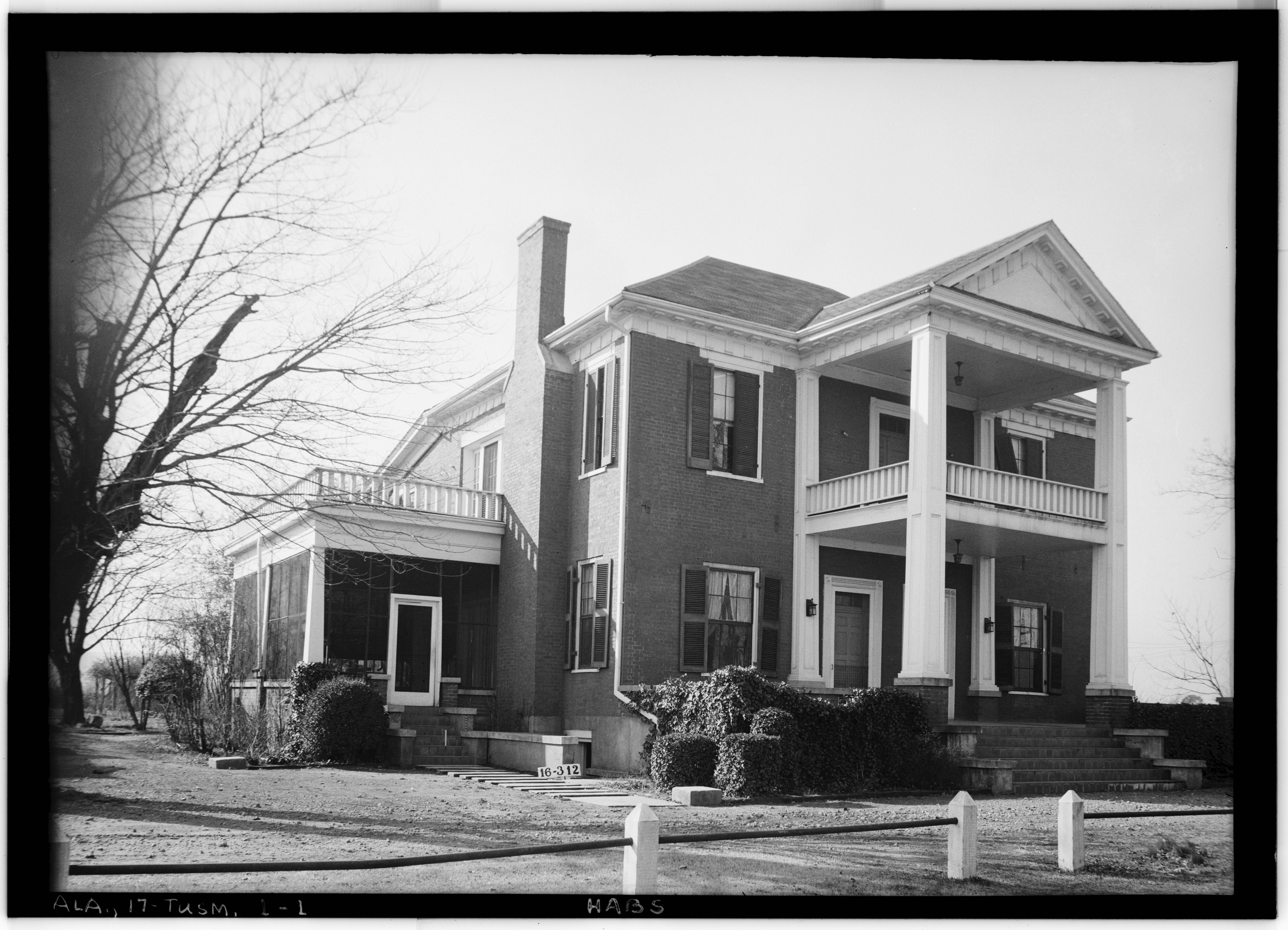
- The house in a 1933 HABS photo

- Location within Alabama Location within the United States
- Location: Off US 72, Tuscumbia, Alabama
- Coordinates: 34°43′5″N 87°42′14″W
- Area: 0.3 acres (0.12 ha)
- NRHP reference No.: 82002004
- Added to NRHP: February 4, 1982

The John and Archibald Christian House (also known as the Lindsay House) is a historic residence near Tuscumbia, Alabama, United States. The house was built in the 1830s by brothers John and Archibald Christian, who were among a group of settlers from the Piedmont region of Virginia who came to Tuscumbia in the 1820s and 1830s. The family had left the house by the 1860s, and in the late 19th century, it was the home of Governor Robert B. Lindsay. In the 1900s, the house was the center of a dairy farm, before it and the surrounding 50 acres (20 ha) were acquired by the Tennessee Valley Country Club in 1923. The country club uses the house as a social meeting area and caretaker's quarters.

Situated on a hill overlooking Tuscumbia, the house has a double-height portico flanked by six-over-six sash windows on each floor. Twin entrance doors lead into separate front rooms that were a portion of the house as originally built. Each room has an Adamesque mantel. A transverse rear hall was added around 1923, joining the main block with a detached kitchen. The main stairway to the second floor was moved to this hall, replacing separate stairhalls in the front rooms.

The house was listed on the National Register of Historic Places in 1982.
