= Le Cannet =

Commune in Provence-Alpes-Côte d'Azur, France

Le Cannet Lo Canet (Occitan)
- Commune
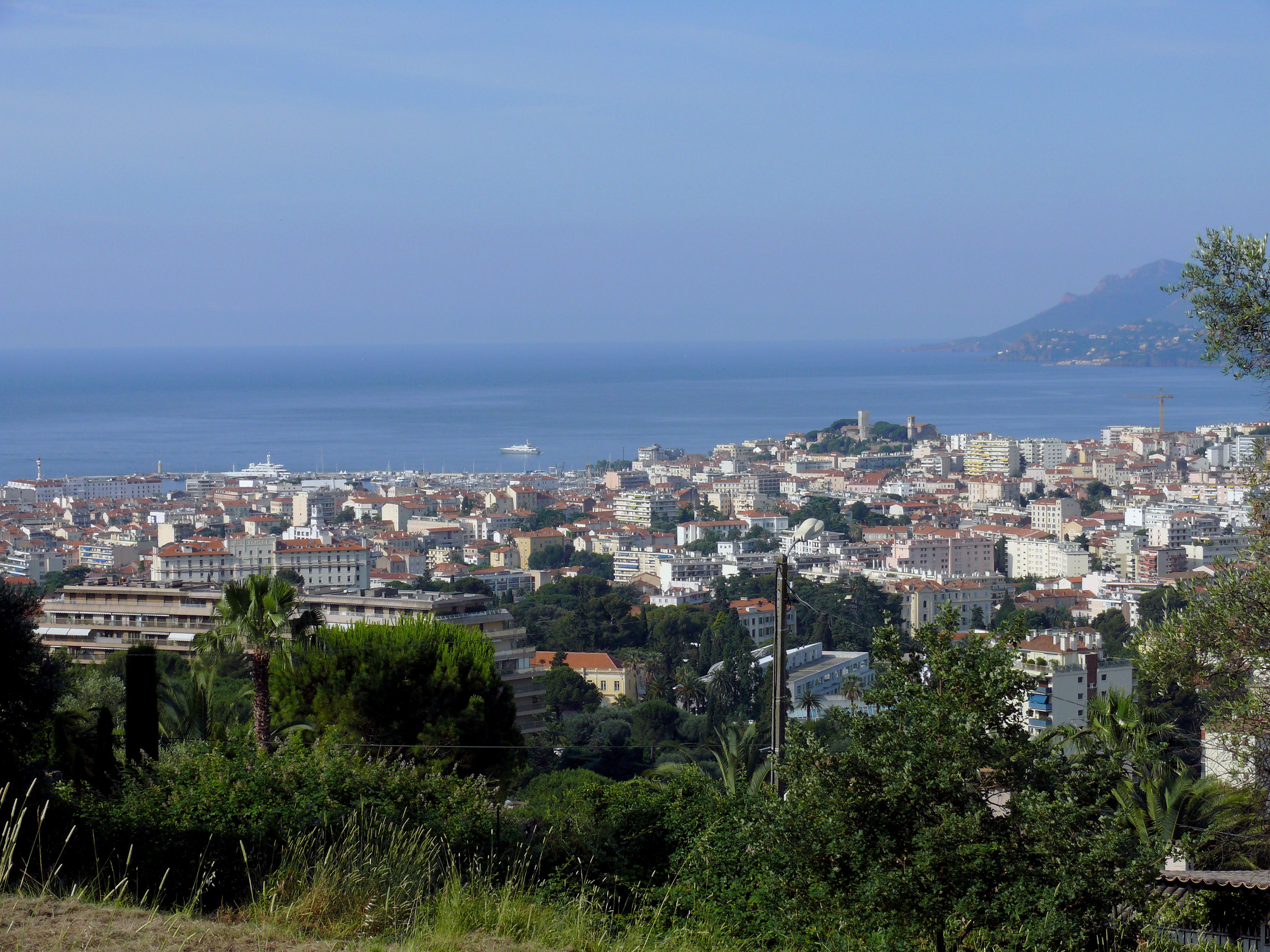
- Cannes, seen from Victoria Avenue, Le Cannet

- Coat of arms
- Location of Le Cannet
- Location within France Location within Provence-Alpes-Côte d'Azur
- Coordinates: 43°34′37″N 7°01′10″E
- Country: France
- Region: Provence-Alpes-Côte d'Azur
- Department: Alpes-Maritimes
- Arrondissement: Grasse
- Canton: Cannes-1 and Le Cannet
- Intercommunality: CA Cannes Pays de Lérins

Government
  - Mayor (2026–32): Yves Pigrenet
- Area^{1}: 7.71 km^{2} (2.98 sq mi)
- Elevation: 110 m (360 ft)
- Highest elevation: 285 m (935 ft)
- Lowest elevation: 12 m (39 ft)
- Population (2023): 41,938
  - Density: 5,440/km^{2} (14,100/sq mi)
- Time zone: UTC+01:00 (CET)
  - Summer (DST): UTC+02:00 (CEST)
- INSEE/Postal code: 06030 /06110
- ^{1} French Land Register data, which excludes lakes, ponds, glaciers > 1 km^{2} (0.386 sq mi or 247 acres) and river estuaries.

Le Cannet (French pronunciation: [lə kanɛ]; Occitan: Lo Canet; older Italian: Canneto) is a commune of the Alpes-Maritimes department in southeastern France.

== History ==
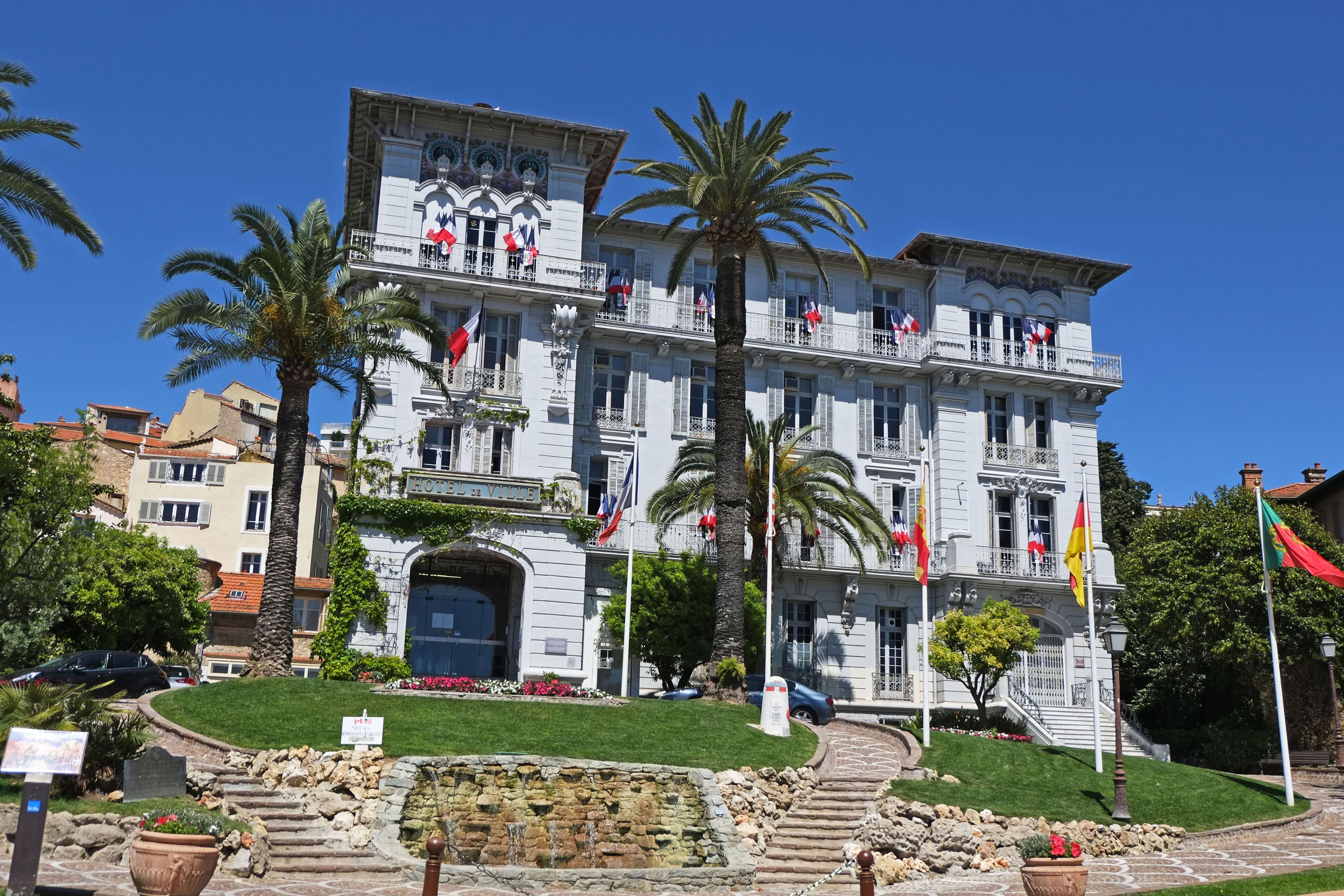
The Hôtel de Ville

The Hôtel de Ville was completed in 1902.

== Administration ==
Le Cannet was part of Cannes until 1778, when it was made a separate commune.

== Location ==
Le Cannet is located in the north of Cannes, on the French Riviera, approximately 2 kilometers from the Mediterranean Sea. The two cities form a single urban area. It has a typical Mediterranean climate. Being well located, protected by numerous pine covered hills allows the city to benefit from a form of micro-climate, defined by its low level of humidity and ice, even during winter. These characteristics have made it a particularly appreciated part of the region

== Population ==
Historical population

Year	Pop.	±% p.a.
1793	1,189	—
1800	1,289	+1.16%
1806	1,229	−0.79%
1821	1,433	+1.03%
1831	1,480	+0.32%
1836	1,532	+0.69%
1841	1,546	+0.18%
1846	1,480	−0.87%
1851	1,591	+1.46%
1856	1,596	+0.06%
1861	1,676	+0.98%
1866	1,762	+1.01%
1872	1,722	−0.38%
1876	1,738	+0.23%
1881	2,563	+8.08%
1886	2,552	−0.09%
1891	2,572	+0.16%
1896	2,593	+0.16%
1901	3,097	+3.62%

Year	Pop.	±% p.a.
1906	3,642	+3.30%
1911	4,166	+2.72%
1921	3,883	−0.70%
1926	6,244	+9.97%
1931	10,016	+9.91%
1936	10,056	+0.08%
1946	10,299	+0.24%
1954	11,601	+1.50%
1962	15,499	+3.69%
1968	23,231	+6.98%
1975	33,892	+5.54%
1982	37,411	+1.42%
1990	41,842	+1.41%
1999	42,158	+0.08%
2007	42,207	+0.01%
2012	43,115	+0.43%
2017	41,471	−0.77%
2023	41,938	+0.19%

Source: EHESS and INSEE (1968-2023)

== Personalities ==
Le Cannet was the birthplace of:

- Victorien Sardou (1831–1908), dramatist
- Richard Galliano (born 1950), accordionist
- François Garde (born 1959), High-ranking official and writer

It was the home of:

- Margaret Caroline Anderson, editor of The Little Review
- Georgette Leblanc , operatic soprano, actress, author
- Pierre Bonnard, painter

It is the home of:

- Patrick Tambay, former Formula 1 driver and City Councillor of Le Cannet

== Twin towns ==
Le Cannet is twinned with:

- Benidorm, Spain
- Königstein im Taunus, Germany
- Lafayette, United States
- Magione, Italy
- Vila do Conde, Portugal

== See also ==
- Communes of the Alpes-Maritimes department
