= Alain Ducasse =

French-born Monégasque chef (born 1956)

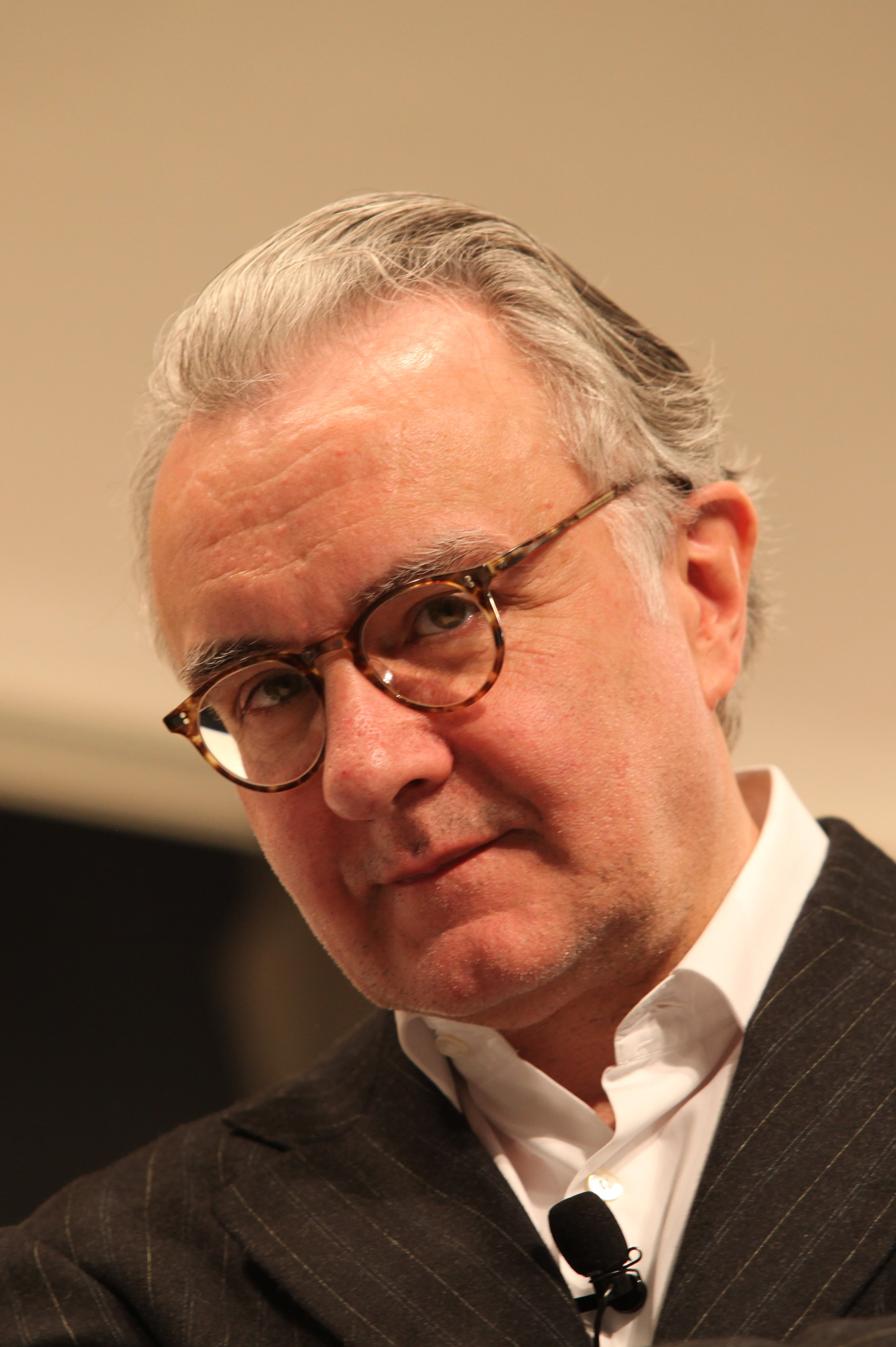
- Alain at Identità Golose Conference 2010
- Born: 13 September 1956 (age 70); Orthez, France
- Culinary career
- Cooking style: Haute cuisine
- Ratings
- Michelin stars AA Rosettes
- Current restaurants
- Le Louis XV; Alain Ducasse at The Dorchester; Blue by Alain Ducasse; Alain Ducasse at Morpheus; Restaurant Le Meurice Alain Ducasse; Le Grill; BEIGE Alain Ducasse; IDAM by Alain Ducasse; La Bastide de Moustiers; ESTERRE by Alain Ducasse; Il Ristorante Alain Ducasse Napoli; Ducasse au Château de Versailles - Le Grand Contrôle
- Website: alain-ducasse.com

Alain Ducasse (French: [alɛ̃ dykas]; born 13 September 1956) is a French-born Monégasque chef. He operates a number of restaurants, including Alain Ducasse at The Dorchester, which holds three stars (the top rating) in the Michelin Guide.

== Early life and career ==
Ducasse was born in Orthez in southwestern France and was educated on a farm in Castel-Sarrazin. In 1972, when he was sixteen, Ducasse began an apprenticeship at the Pavillon Landais restaurant in Soustons and at the Bordeaux hotel school. After this apprenticeship, he began work at Michel Guérard's restaurant in Eugénie-les-Bains while also working for Gaston Lenôtre during the summer months. In 1977, Ducasse started working as an assistant at Moulin de Mougins under legendary chef Roger Vergé, creator of Cuisine du Soleil, and learned the Provençal cooking methods for which he was later known.

In 2012 he held 21 Michelin stars, making him the second ranked chef worldwide in terms of total Michelin stars – Joël Robuchon had 31 and Gordon Ramsay had 17 at the time.

Ducasse's first position as chef came in 1980 when he took over the kitchens at L'amandier in Mougins. One year later, he assumed the position of head chef at La Terrasse in the Hôtel Juana in Juan-les-Pins. In 1984, he was awarded two stars in the Michelin Red Guide. In the same year Ducasse was the only survivor of a Piper Aztec aircraft crash that injured him severely.

== Career as chef ==
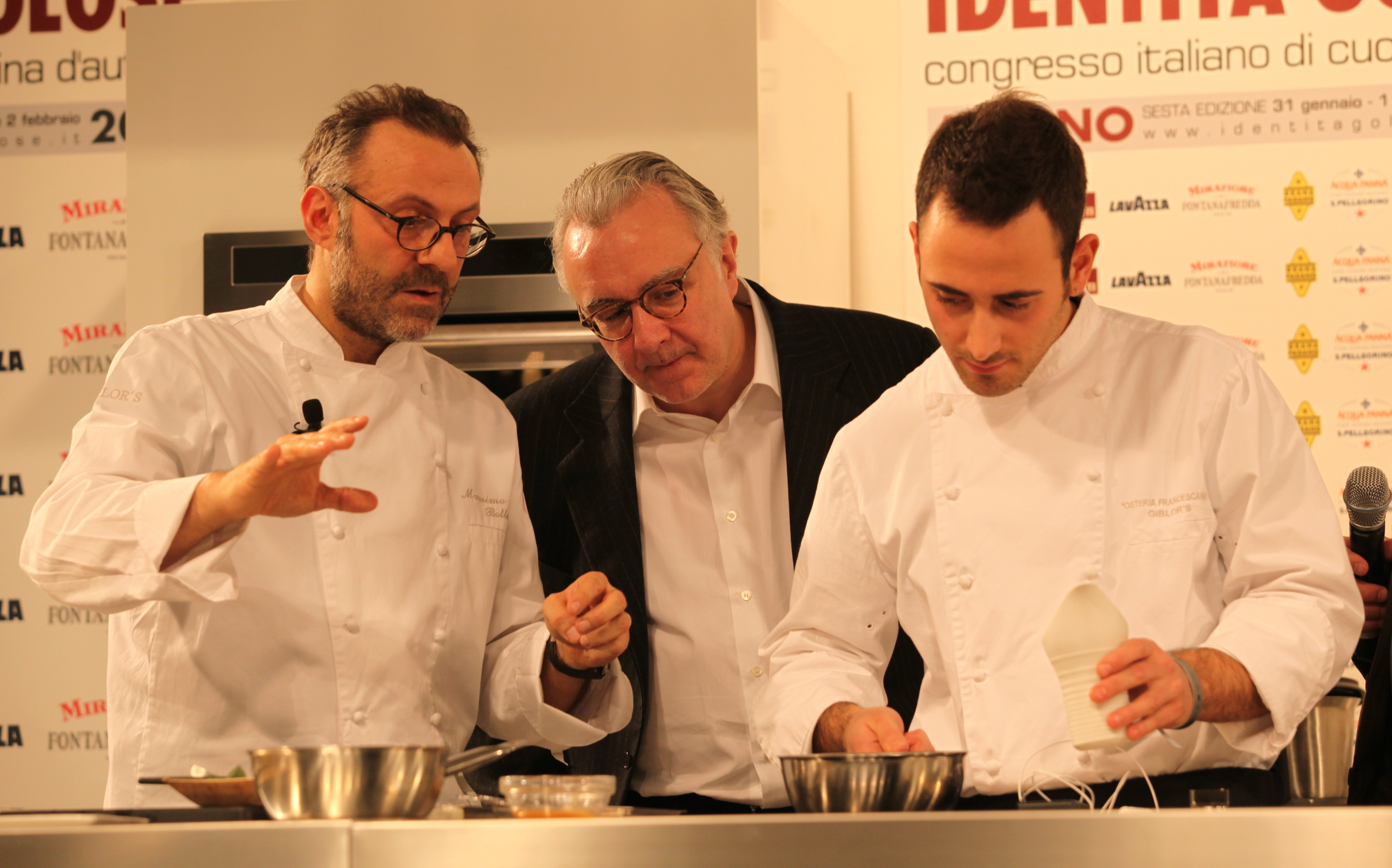
Alain Ducasse (centre) at the Congresso italiano di cucina d'autore with Massimo Bottura (left)

In 1986, Ducasse was offered the chef position at the Hôtel de Paris in Monte Carlo, with management including the hotel's Le Louis XV. After assuring himself that the Hotel's other restaurant operations were operating well, Ducasse continued to run management.

In 1988, Ducasse expanded beyond the restaurant industry and opened La Bastide de Moustiers, a twelve-bedroom country inn in Provence and he began attaining financial interests in other Provence hotels. On 12 August 1996, the Alain Ducasse restaurant opened in Le Parc – Sofitel Demeure Hôtels in the 16th arrondissement of Paris. The Red Guide awarded the restaurant three stars just eight months after opening.

Ducasse went to the United States and in June 2000 opened the Alain Ducasse restaurant in New York City's Essex hotel at 160 Central Park South, receiving the Red Guide's three stars in December 2005, in the first Red Guide for NYC. Ducasse became the first chef to have three restaurants awarded three Michelin stars at the same time. That restaurant closed in 2007 when Ducasse chose to open a restaurant in Las Vegas named Mix, which later went on to earn one star in the Michelin Red Guide. In early 2008, Ducasse opened Adour, at the St. Regis Hotel on 16th and K Street in Washington, D.C., and has also opened the more casual Bistro Benoit New York, at 60 West 55th Street.

On 2 July 2011, Ducasse prepared a multi-course gala dinner for the wedding of Prince Albert and Charlene Wittstock. It was the first time he prepared an official meal for a head of state. He was also in charge of preparing the post-festivities brunch on 3 July, in conjunction with Joël Robuchon.

== Recognition ==
Ducasse became the first chef to own restaurants carrying three Michelin Stars in three cities. The New York restaurant was dropped from the 2007 Michelin Guide because the restaurant was scheduled to close. Ducasse has become known through his writing and influences. Ducasse is also only one of two chefs to hold 21 Michelin stars throughout his career.

He has been special guest in the US and Italian versions of MasterChef. In 2013 he was awarded the Lifetime Achievement on The World's 50 Best Restaurants List. In June 2022 he was recognized by the International Hospitality Institute on the Global 100 in Hospitality, a list featuring the 100 Most Powerful People in Global Hospitality.

== Nationality ==
Ducasse was a French citizen by birth. On 17 June 2008, he became a naturalized citizen of Monaco. He chose Monegasque citizenship in order to take advantage of the principality's tax rates, giving up his French nationality as Monegasque people were not allowed to hold dual citizenship at this time.

== Restaurants and operations ==
Alain Ducasse's restaurants, cooking schools, cookbooks, and consulting activities had revenues of $15.9 million in 2002. Ducasse has also opened a cooking school for the general public in Paris and another for chefs (ADF), which also works for the European Space Agency to develop astronaut meals to be taken into space.

Ducasse's recent restaurants include:

- Adour (Paris, France) - at L'Ecole Ducasse
- Alain Ducasse Baccarat (Meudon, France) – also: Le Jardin (terrace at Alain Ducasse Baccarat) and Midi-Minuit (bar and restaurant at Alain Ducasse Baccarat)
- Alain Ducasse at The Dorchester (London, UK)
- Alain Ducasse at Morpheus (Cotai, Macau, China)
- Allard (Paris, France)
- Beige (Tokyo, Japan)
- Benoit (Paris, France)
- Benoit (Tokyo, Japan)
- Benoit (Kyoto, Japan)
- Benoit (New York, US)
- Blue by Alain Ducasse (Bangkok, Thailand)
- Ducasse Sur Seine (Paris, France) – restaurant cruise boat
- Esterre (Tokyo, Japan) in Palace Hotel Tokyo
- Girandole by Alain Ducasse (Bangkok, Thailand)
- IDAM (Doha, Qatar) - in Museum of Islamic Art; also MIA Cafe
- Il Ristorante Alain Ducasse at Romeo Napoli (Napoli, Italy) – in Hotel ROMEO
- Il Ristorante Alain Ducasse at Romeo Roma (Rome, Italy) – in Romeo Hotel Roma
- Jiwan by Alain Ducasse (Doha, Qatar) – in National Museum of Qatar
- La Bastide de Moustiers (Moustier Ste Marie, France) – restaurant and inn
- La Table des Jardiniers (Versailles, France)
- L'esprit Bistrot (Paris, France) – bistro within cooking school L’Ecole Ducasse
- Le Louis XV (Monte Carlo, Monaco) – in Hotel de Paris Monte-Carlo; also Le Grill
- Le Meurice Alain Ducasse (Paris, France) – in Hotel Le Meurice
- Le Salon des Manufactures (Paris, France)
- L'Hostellerie de l'Abbaye de la Celle (La Celle, France) – restaurant and inn
- Muni Alain Ducasse (Kyoto, Japan) – in Muni Kyoto; also, Muni La Terrasse
- Nuna - located aboard the polar exploration vessel Le Commandant Charcot
- Ore (Versailles, France)
- Rivea (London, UK) – in Bulgari Hotel
- Rivea Las Vegas (formerly MiX) (Las Vegas, US)
- Sapid Seoul (Seoul, South Korea)

Former restaurants include:

- Adjuge (Paris, France) – closed 2021
- ADMO (Paris, France) – closed 2025
- Adour (New York, US) – closed 2012
- Alain Ducasse au Plaza Athenee (Paris, France) – changed ownership and name 2021; also, Le Relais Plaza
- Alain Ducasse at the Essex House [ADNY] (New York, US) – closed 2007
- Auberge Iparla (Bidarray, France) – closed 2009
- Aux Lyonnais (Paris, France) – changed ownership August 2025
- Bar & Billiard Room (Singapore) – closed 2023
- Bar & Boeuf (later La Trattoria Sporting) (Monte Carlo, Monaco) – closed 2017
- Bib & Guss (Paris, France) – closed 2023
- Champeaux (Paris, France) – closed 2023
- Cucina Mutualite (Paris, France) – closed 2025
- Domaine des Anderols (Luberon, France) – closed 2010
- Il Cortile (Paris, France) – consulting chef from 1997-2005
- La Cour Jardin (Paris, France) – oversaw culinary operations from 2000-2001
- L'Andana (later Trattoria Toscana) (Castiglione della Pescaia, Grosseto, Italy) – closed 2016
- La Terrasse (Antibes, France) – head chef from 1981-1987
- Le Jules Verne (Eiffel Tower, Paris, France) – oversaw culinary operations from 1996-2020
- Le Relais du Parc (Paris, France) – oversaw culinary operations from 1996-2020
- MiX Dubai (Dubai, UAE) – closed 2021
- MiX New York (New York, US) – closed 2005
- MiX on the Beach (Vieques, Puerto Rico) – closed 2012
- OMER (Monte Carlo, Monaco) – closed 2020
- Ostape (Bidarray, France) – closed 2009
- Le Reche (Paris, France) – from 2007-2009
- Restaurant Alain Ducasse at 59 Raymond (later 59 Poincare) (Paris, France) – until 2020
- Sapid (Paris, France) – closed 2025
- Spoon (Paris, France) – closed 2025
- Spoon (later Reche) (Hong Kong) – closed 2020
- Spoon Byblos (later Rivea Byblos, and Cucina Byblos) (Saint-Tropez, France) – through 2024
- Spoon Carthage (Carthage, Tunisia) – closed 2006
- Spoon des Iles (Bella Mare, Mauritius) – closed 2007
- Spoon Food & Wine (Paris, France) – closed 2010
- Spoon+ London (London, UK) – closed 2007
- Tamaris (Beirut, Lebanon) – closed 2006
- Voyages by Alain Ducasse (Macau) – closed 2020

In 2004 Alain Ducasse opened a restaurant in a resort near Biarritz, in the French Basque Country. However, after several bombing attacks by Irrintzi, an armed Basque nationalist organization, which accused him of being a speculator and of "folkloring" the Basque Country, Ducasse decided to leave the Basque Country.

In 2027, Ducasse will open a steakhouse at Wynn Al Marjan Island in Ras Al Khaimah. It will be the first integrated resort in the United Arab Emirates and the Middle East.

He prepares bespoke menus for Air France's La Premiere (first class) exclusive departure lounge in Paris Charles de Gaulle Airport.

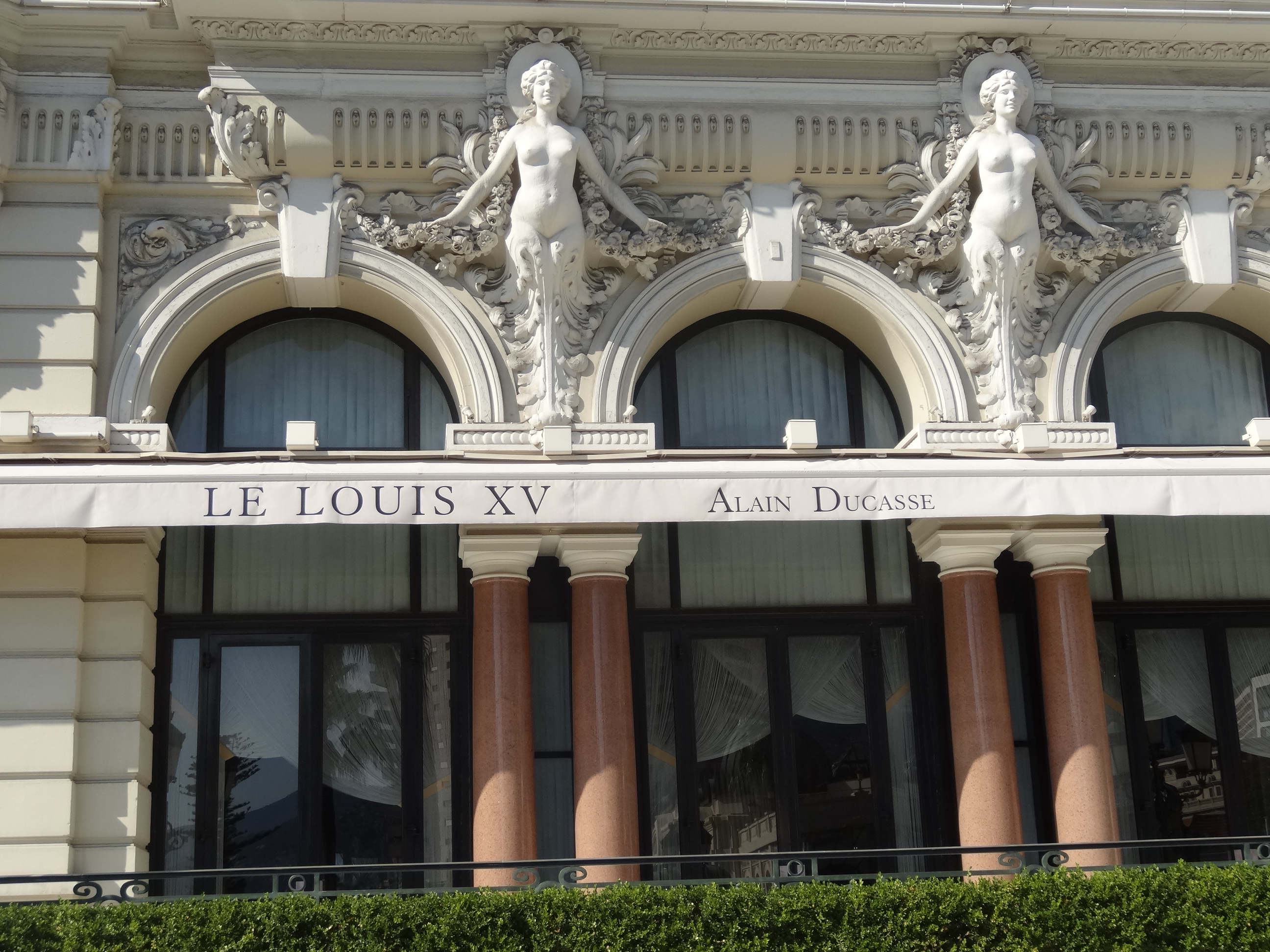
Restaurant Louis XV, Monaco

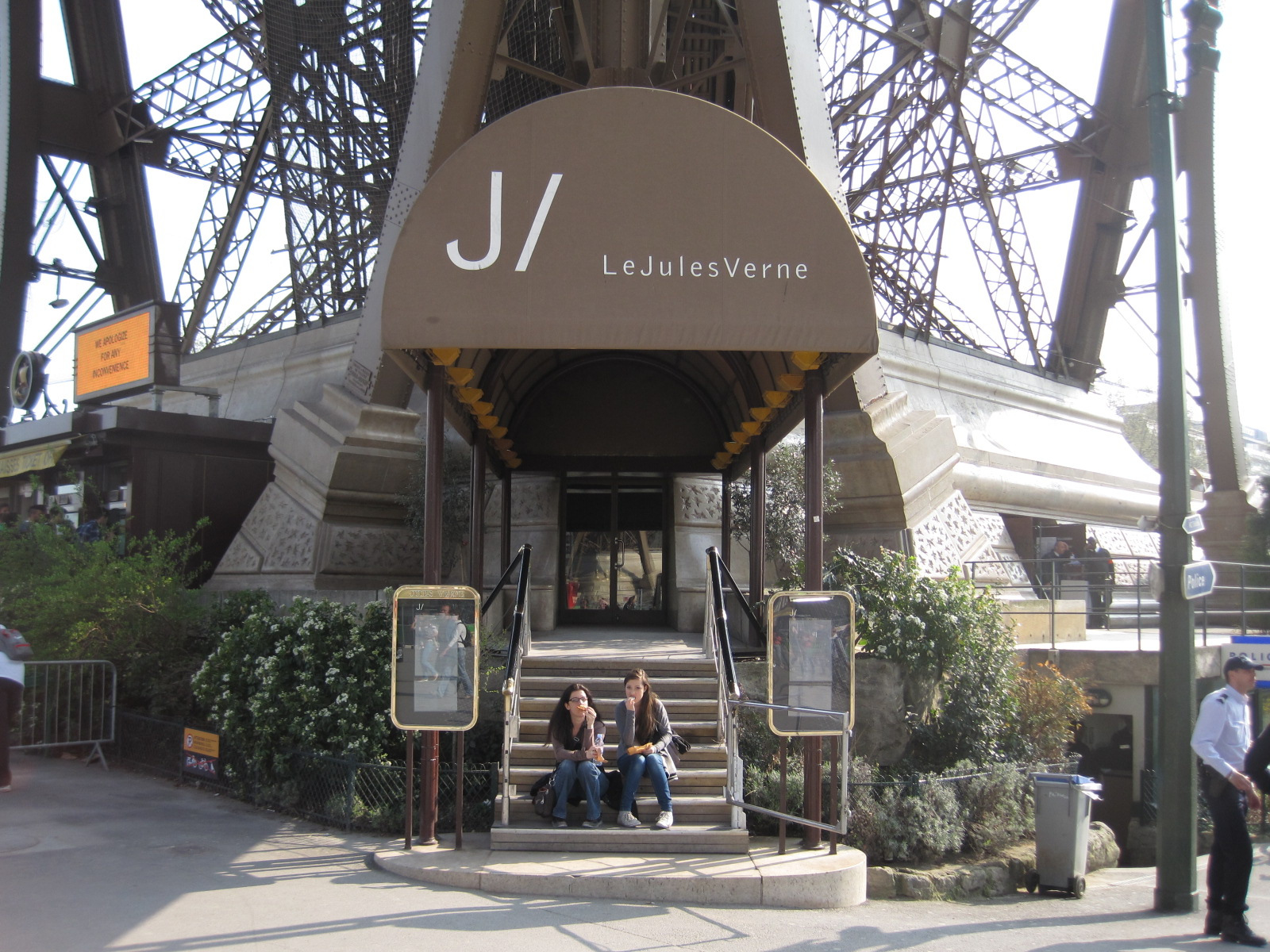
Restaurant Le Jules Verne, Eiffel Tower, Paris, France

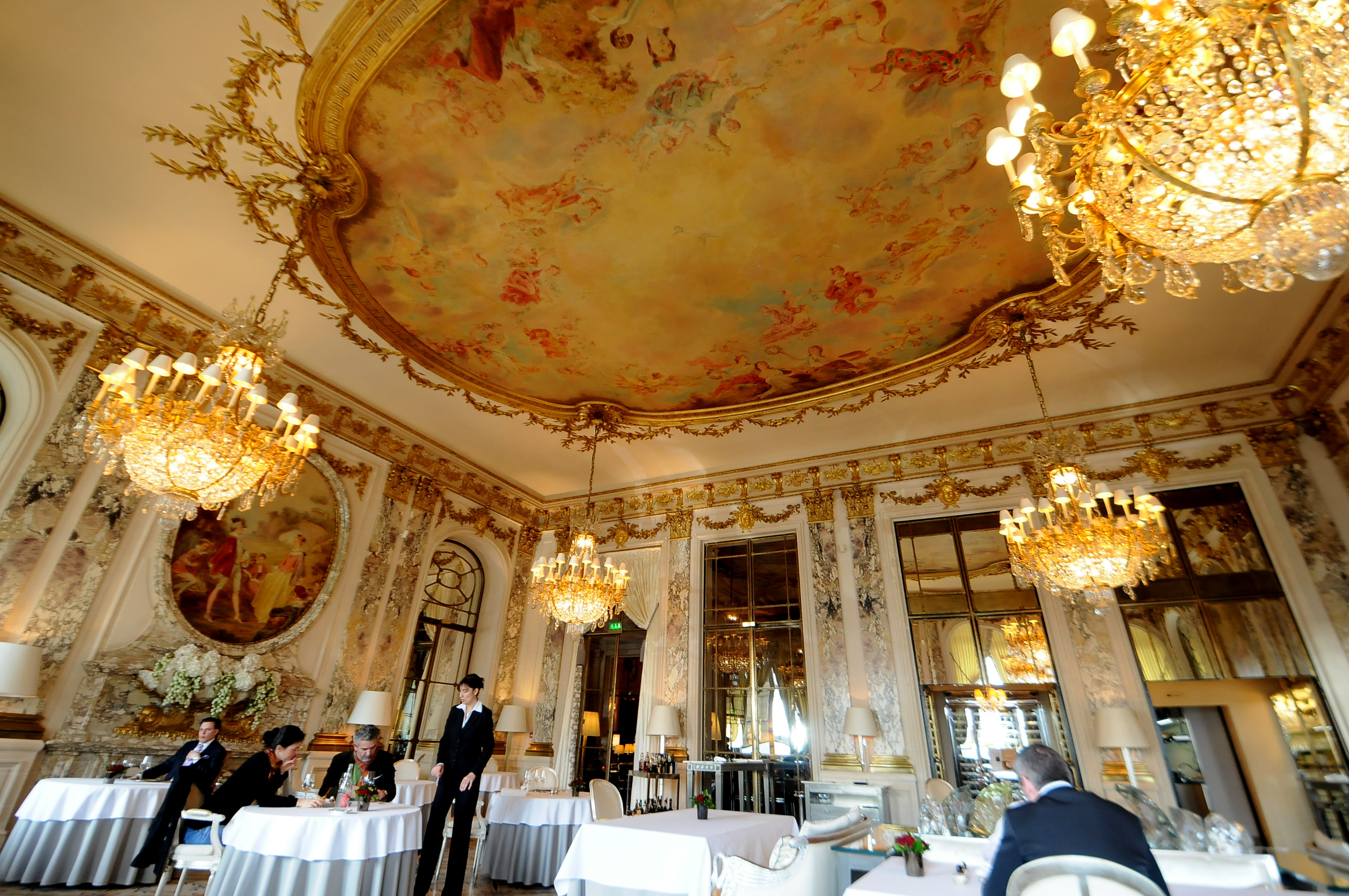
Restaurant Le Meurice, Paris, France

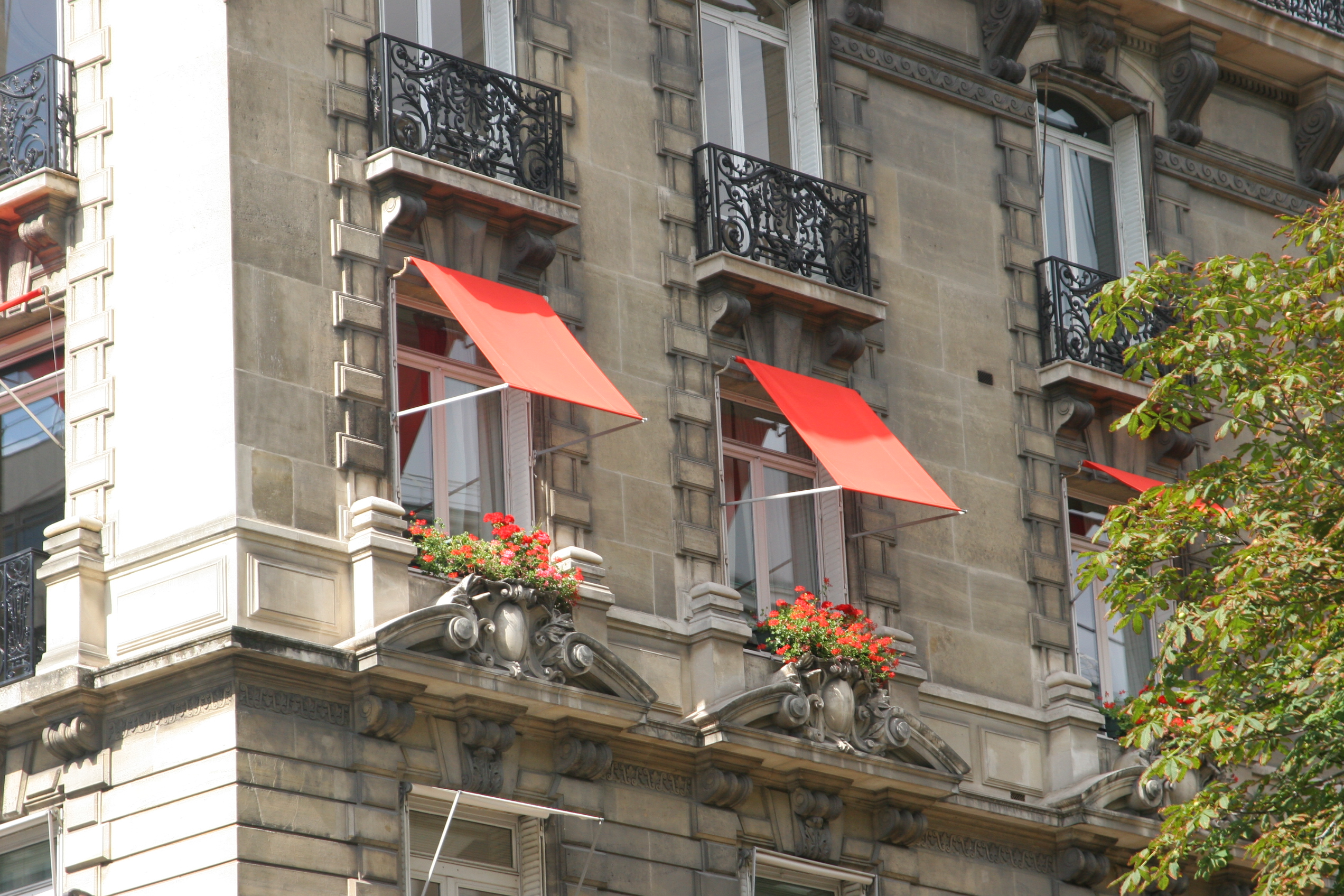
Restaurant le Relais Plaza, Paris, France

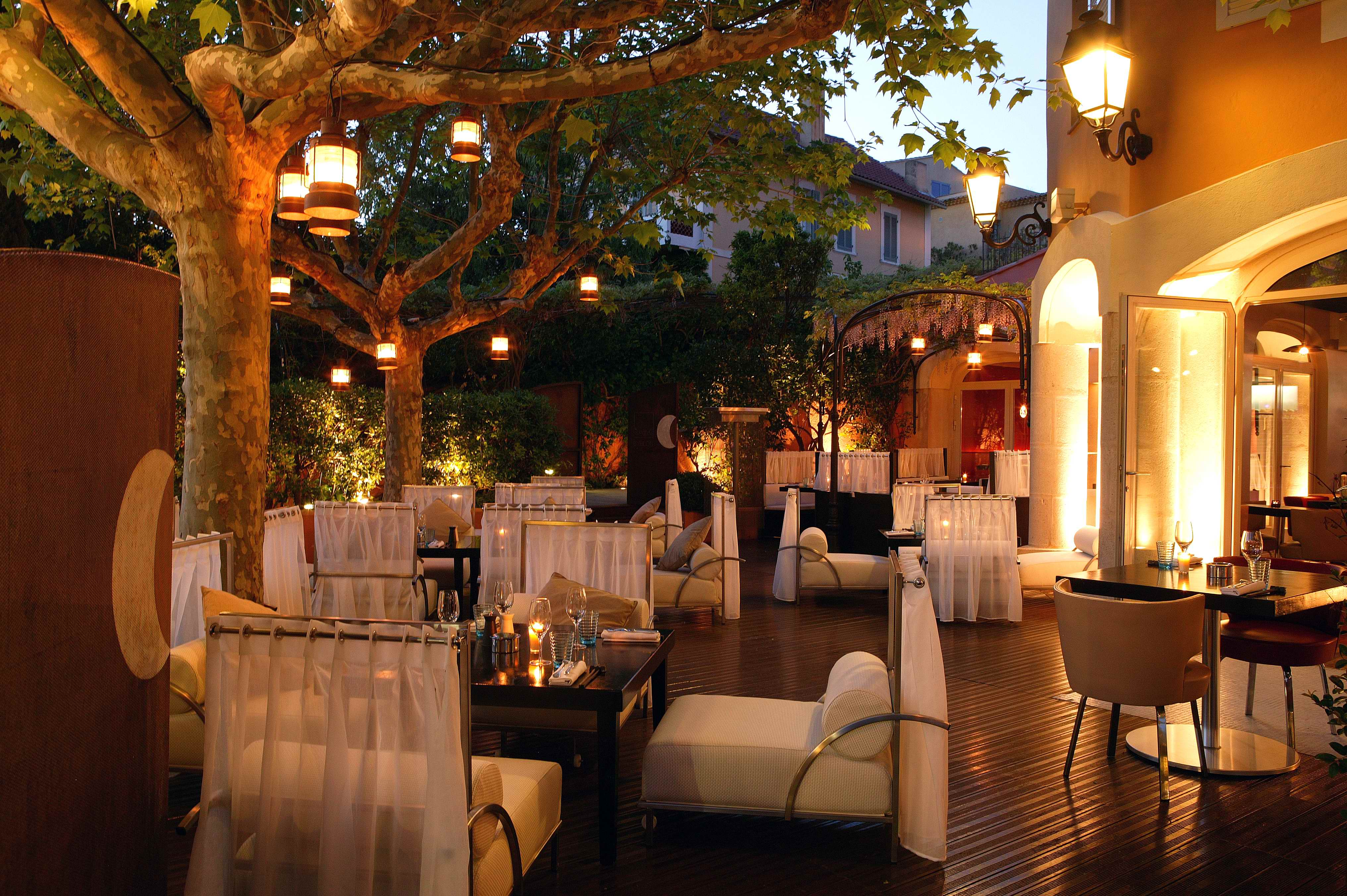
Rivea, Saint-Tropez, France

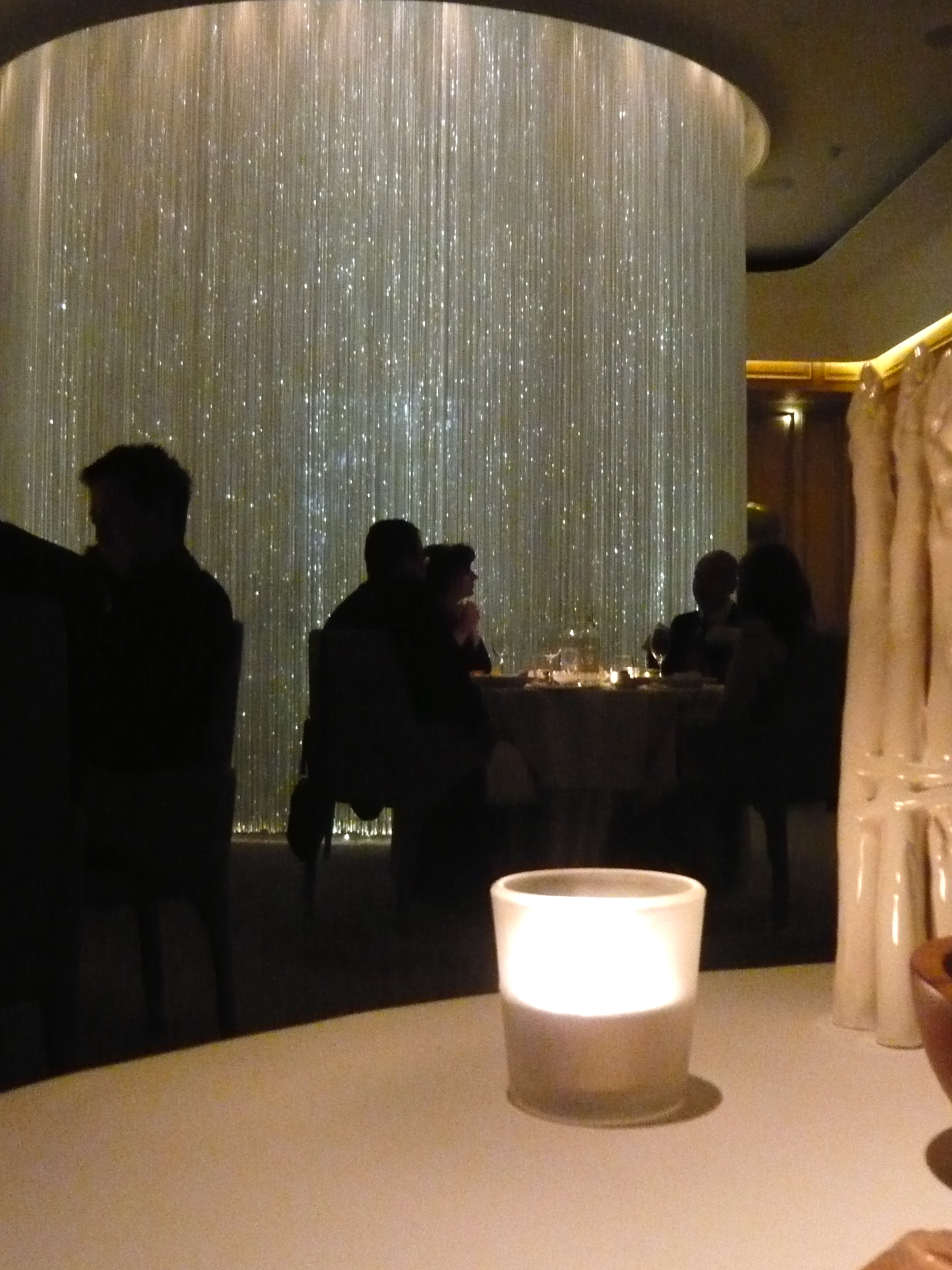
Restaurant Alain Ducasse at The Dorchester, England

== Michelin-starred restaurants associated with Alain Ducasse and their highest rating ==
Key
| 1 Michelin star | One Michelin star |
| 2 Michelin stars | Two Michelin stars |
| 3 Michelin stars | Three Michelin stars |

| No. | Name | Country | Rating |
|---|---|---|---|
| 1 | Le Louis XV - Alain Ducasse à l'Hôtel de Paris (Monte-Carlo) | Monaco | 3 Michelin stars |
| 2 | Alain Ducasse au Hôtel Le Parc (Paris) | France | 3 Michelin stars |
| 3 | Alain Ducasse au Plaza Athénée (Paris) | France | 3 Michelin stars |
| 4 | Restaurant Le Meurice Alain Ducasse (Paris) | France | 3 Michelin stars |
| 5 | Alain Ducasse at Essex House (New York City) | United States | 3 Michelin stars |
| 6 | Alain Ducasse at The Dorchester (London) | England | 3 Michelin stars |
| 7 | La Terrasse (Juan-les-Pins) | France | 2 Michelin stars |
| 8 | ADOUR (New York City) | United States | 2 Michelin stars |
| 9 | BEIGE (Tokyo) | Japan | 2 Michelin stars |
| 10 | Blue by Alain Ducasse (Bangkok) | Thailand | 2 Michelin stars |
| 11 | Alain Ducasse at Morpheus (Macau) | Macau | 2 Michelin stars |
| 12 | Le Grill (Monte-Carlo) | Monaco | 1 Michelin star |
| 13 | Bar & Bœuf (Monte-Carlo) | Monaco | 1 Michelin star |
| 14 | Benoit (Paris) | France | 1 Michelin star |
| 15 | Il Cortile (Paris) | France | 1 Michelin star |
| 16 | Le Jules Verne (Paris) | France | 1 Michelin star |
| 17 | Hostellerie de l'Abbaye de la Celle (La Celle) | France | 1 Michelin star |
| 18 | La Bastide de Moustiers (Moustiers-Sainte-Marie) | France | 1 Michelin star 1 Michelin green star |
| 19 | Ducasse au Château de Versailles - Le Grand Contrôle (Versailles) | France | 1 Michelin star |
| 20 | miX (Las Vegas) | United States | 1 Michelin star |
| 21 | Benoit (Tokyo) | Japan | 1 Michelin star |
| 22 | LA TERRASSE (Kyoto) | Japan | 1 Michelin star |
| 23 | MUNI Alain Ducasse (Kyoto) | Japan | 1 Michelin star |
| 24 | ESTERRE by Alain Ducasse (Tokyo) | Japan | 1 Michelin star |
| 25 | SPOON (Hong Kong) | Hong Kong | 1 Michelin star |
| 26 | Rech by Alain Ducasse (Hong Kong) | Hong Kong | 1 Michelin star |
| 27 | IDAM by Alain Ducasse (Doha) | Qatar | 1 Michelin star |
| 29 | L’Andana (Castiglione della Pescaia) | Italy | 1 Michelin star |
| 30 | Il Ristorante Alain Ducasse Napoli (Naples) | Italy | 1 Michelin star |

== See also ==
- List of Michelin 3-star restaurants
