= List of Indian restaurants =

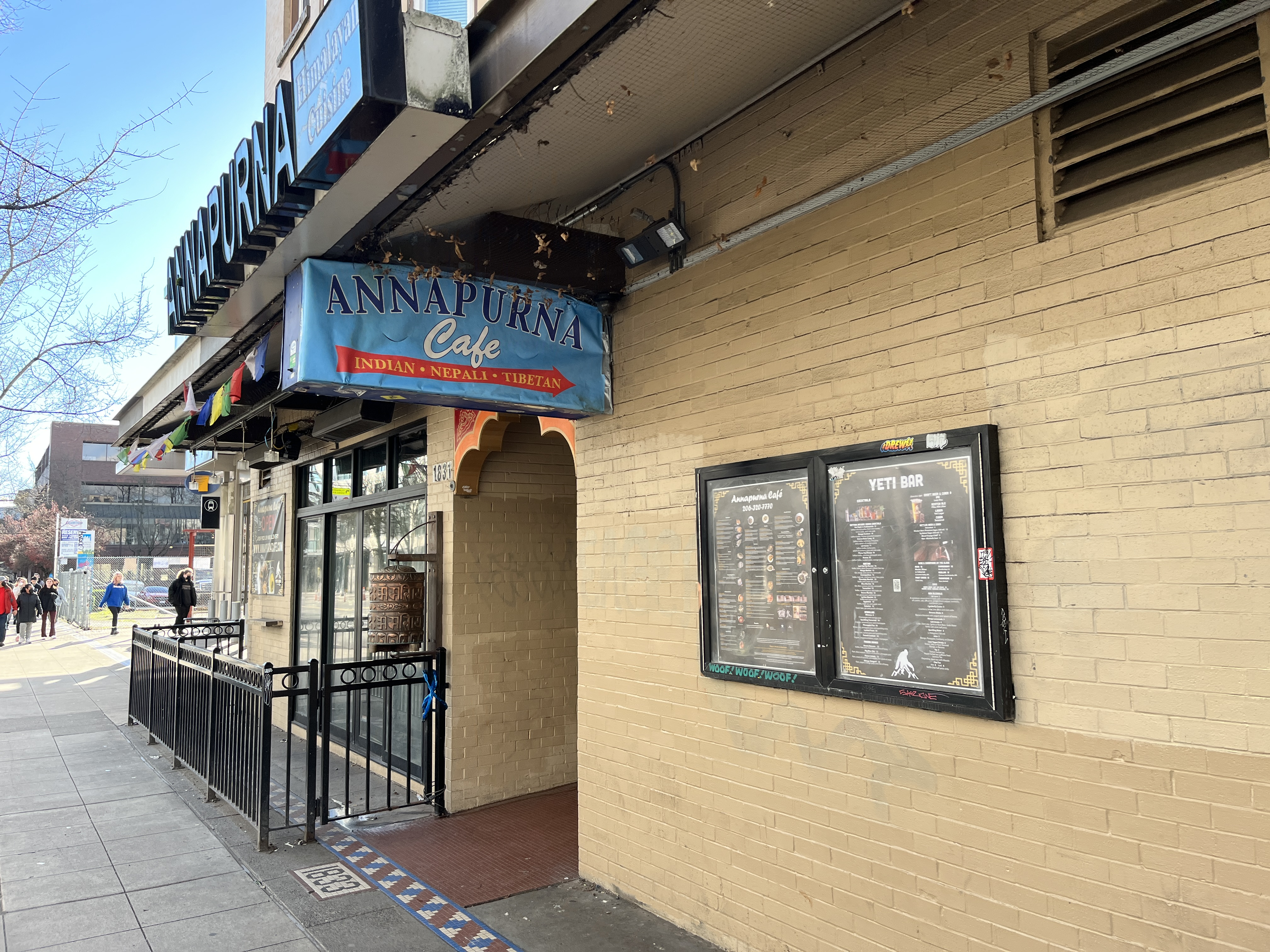
Annapurna Cafe, Seattle, Washington, U.S.

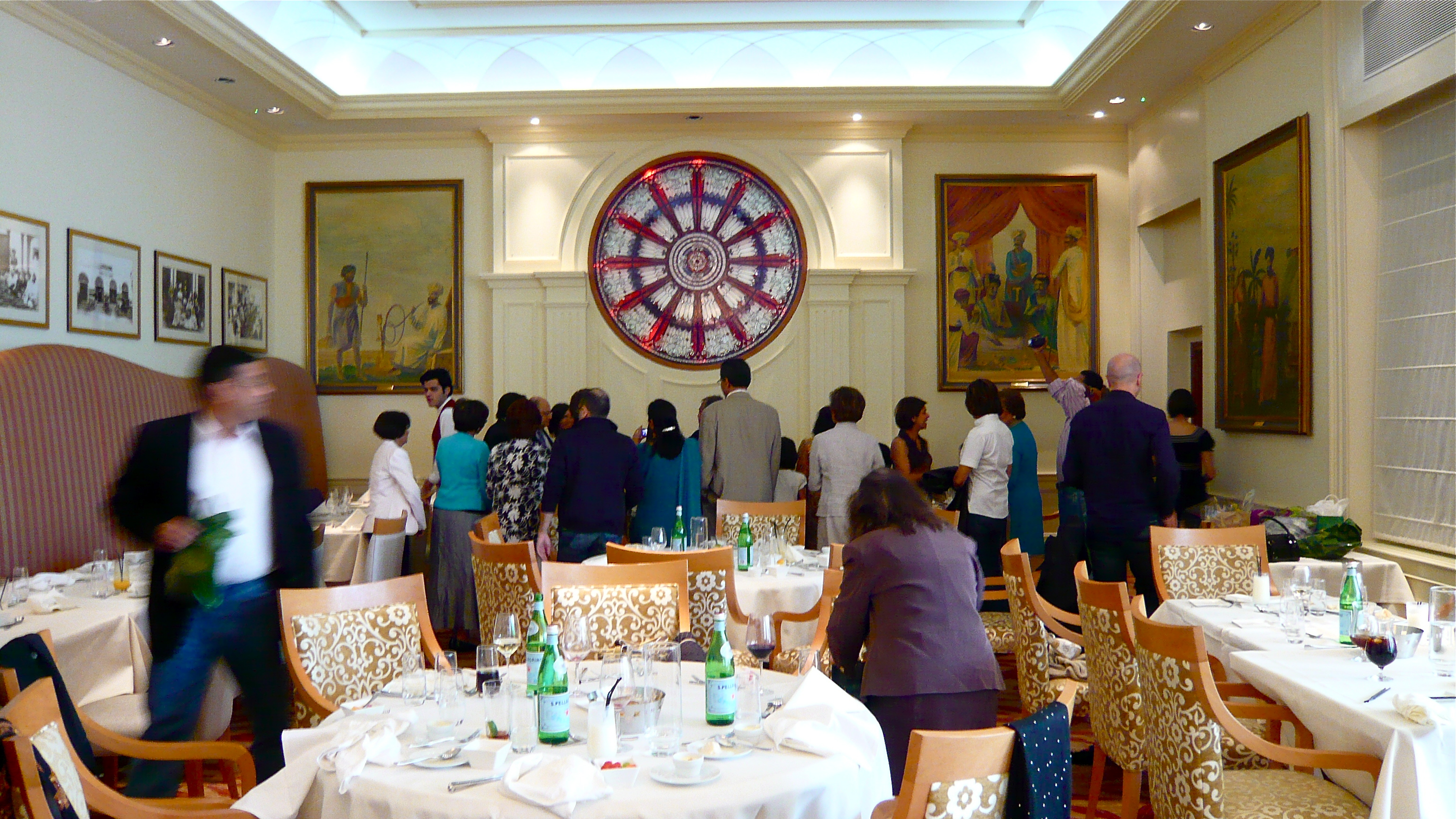
Bombay Brasserie, Kensington, England, United Kingdom

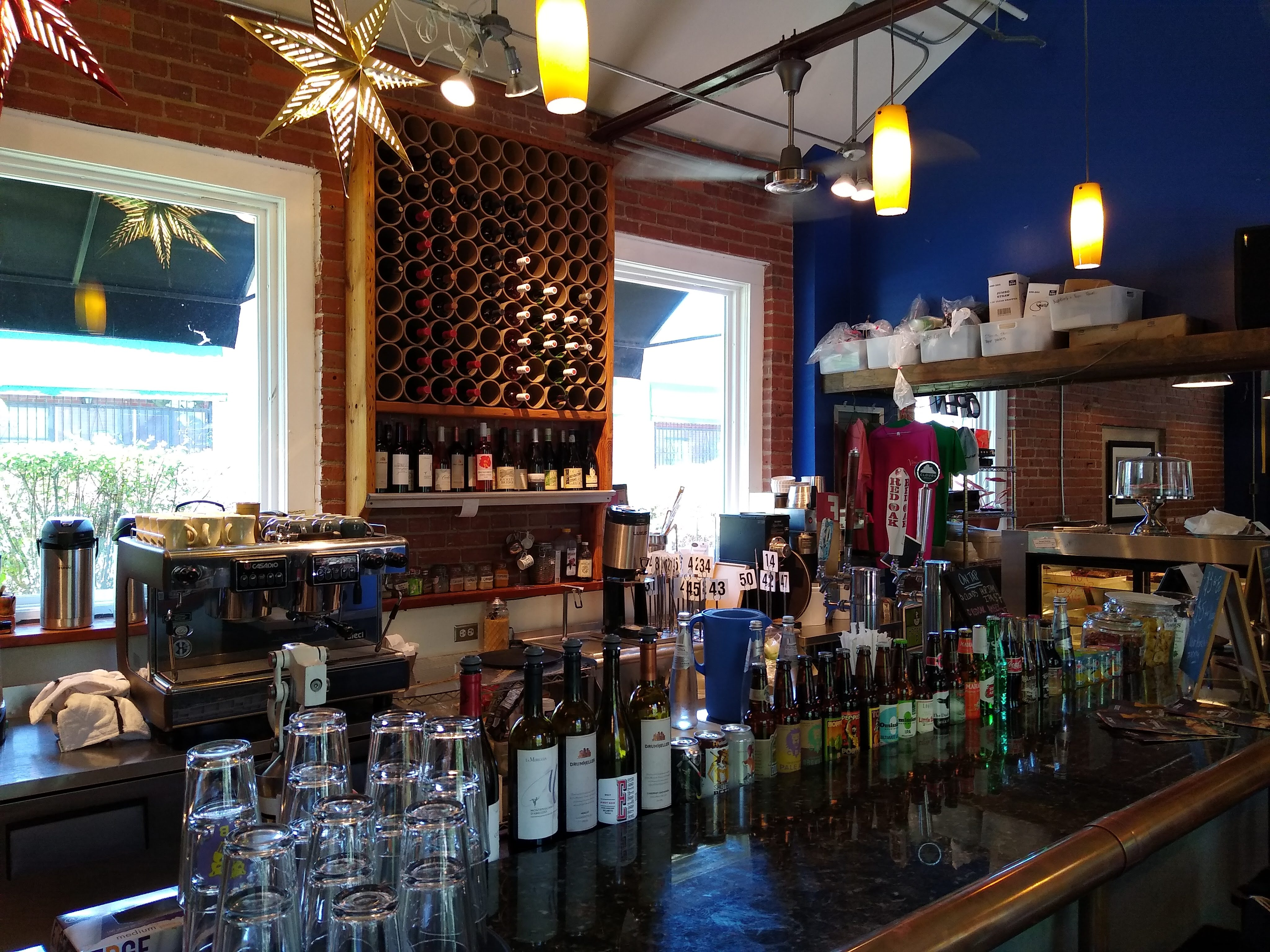
Vimala's Curryblossom Cafe, Chapel Hill, North Carolina, United States

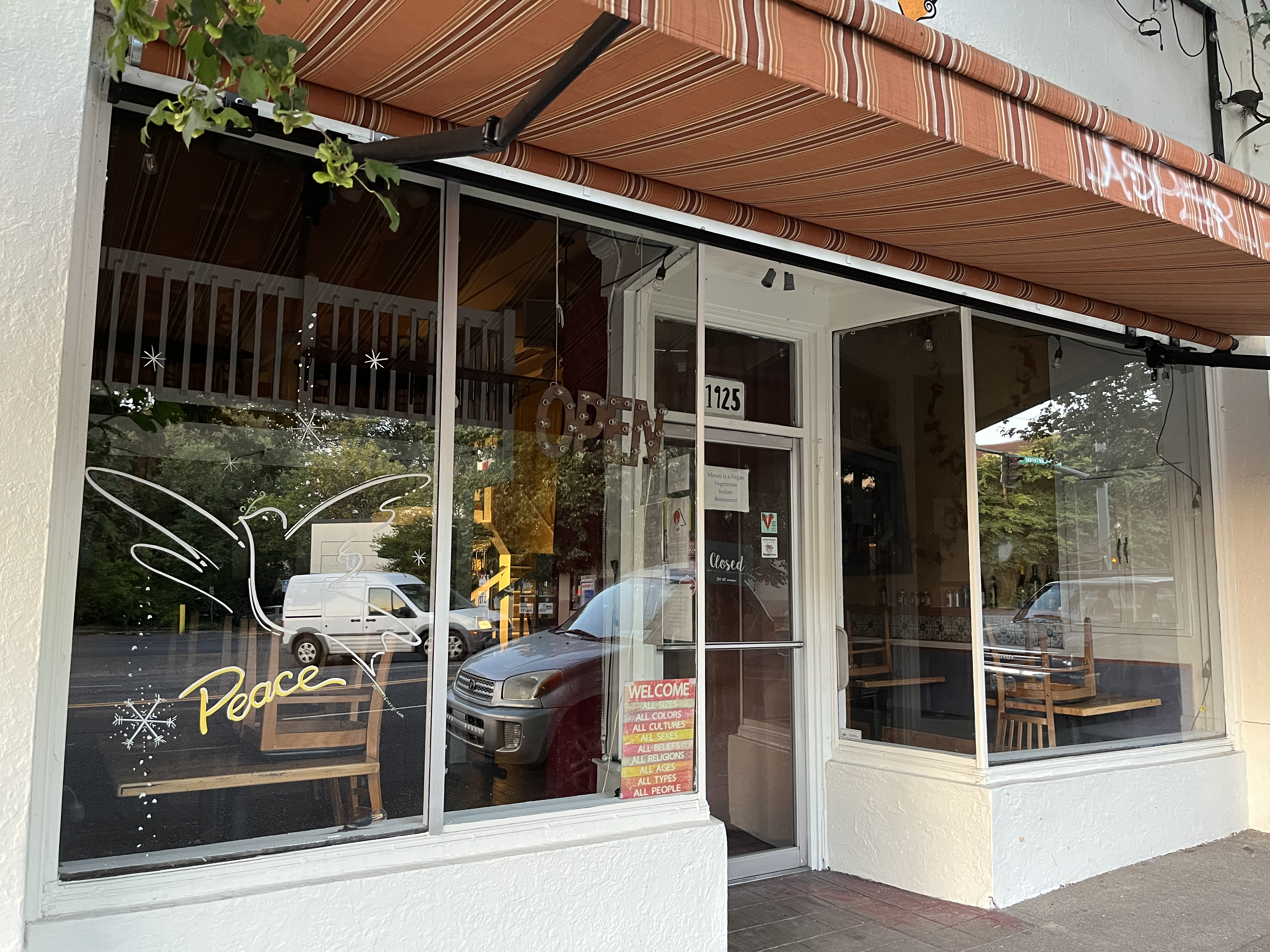
Maruti Indian Restaurant, Portland, Oregon, United States

The following notable restaurants serve or served Indian cuisine:

- Amaya, London
- Annapurna Cafe, Seattle
- Adyar Ananda Bhavan, India
- Appu's Cafe, Long Beach, California
- Avatāra, Dubai
- Benares, London
- Bharath Coffee House, Kochi, India
- Bhuna, Portland, Oregon
- Bollywood Theater, Portland, Oregon, US
- Bombay Brasserie, Kensington, London
- Bombay Cricket Club, Portland, Oregon
- Bundobust—four venues in England
- Bungalow, New York City
- Chai Pani
- Chutney Mary, London
- Daru, Washington, D.C.
- Desi PDX, Portland, Oregon
- Dishoom
- East India Co. Grill and Bar, Portland, Oregon
- Gaggan, Bangkok, Thailand
- Gymkhana, London and Las Vegas
- Hindoostane Coffee House, London
- Indian Accent, New Delhi, India
- Indian-Nepali Kitchen, Seattle
- Indienne, Chicago
- Jamavar, London
- Jumbo King
- Junoon, New York City
- Kanyakumari, New York City
- Karma Indian Bistro, Vancouver, British Columbia
- Karim's, chain of restaurants headquartered in Old Delhi
- Kavita, Vancouver
- Kayees Rahmathulla Hotel, Kochi
- Khan Saab Desi Craft Kitchen, Fullerton, California
- Maruti Indian Restaurant, Portland, Oregon
- Masala Lab PDX, Portland, Oregon
- Masalawala & Sons, New York City
- Masque, Mumbai
- Mavalli Tiffin Rooms
- Meesha, Seattle
- Musaafer, Houston, Texas
- New Punjab Club, Hong Kong
- Nirula's
- Paragon Restaurant, chain of restaurants headquartered in Kozhikode
- Poppy, Seattle
- Rania, Washington, D.C.
- Rasa, Burlingame, California
- Rasika, Washington, D.C.
- Rupee Bar, Seattle
- Spice Waala, Seattle
- The Sudra, Oregon
- Swagat, Portland metropolitan area, Oregon
- Tamarind, London
- Tamarind Tribeca, New York City
- Thattu, Chicago
- Trèsind Studio, Dubai
- Trishna, London
- Tulsi, New York City
- Veeraswamy, London
- Vij's, Vancouver
- Vimala's Curryblossom Cafe, Chapel Hill, North Carolina, US
- Vineet Bhatia London
- Wow! Momo
- Yak and Yeti
- Zaika, Kensington, London

== See also ==
- Bikanervala
- Dhaba
- Haldiram's
- India Club, London - a private members' club, known for serving Indian food
