= Veeraswamy =

Indian restaurant in London

Coordinates: 51°30′36″N 0°8′17″W

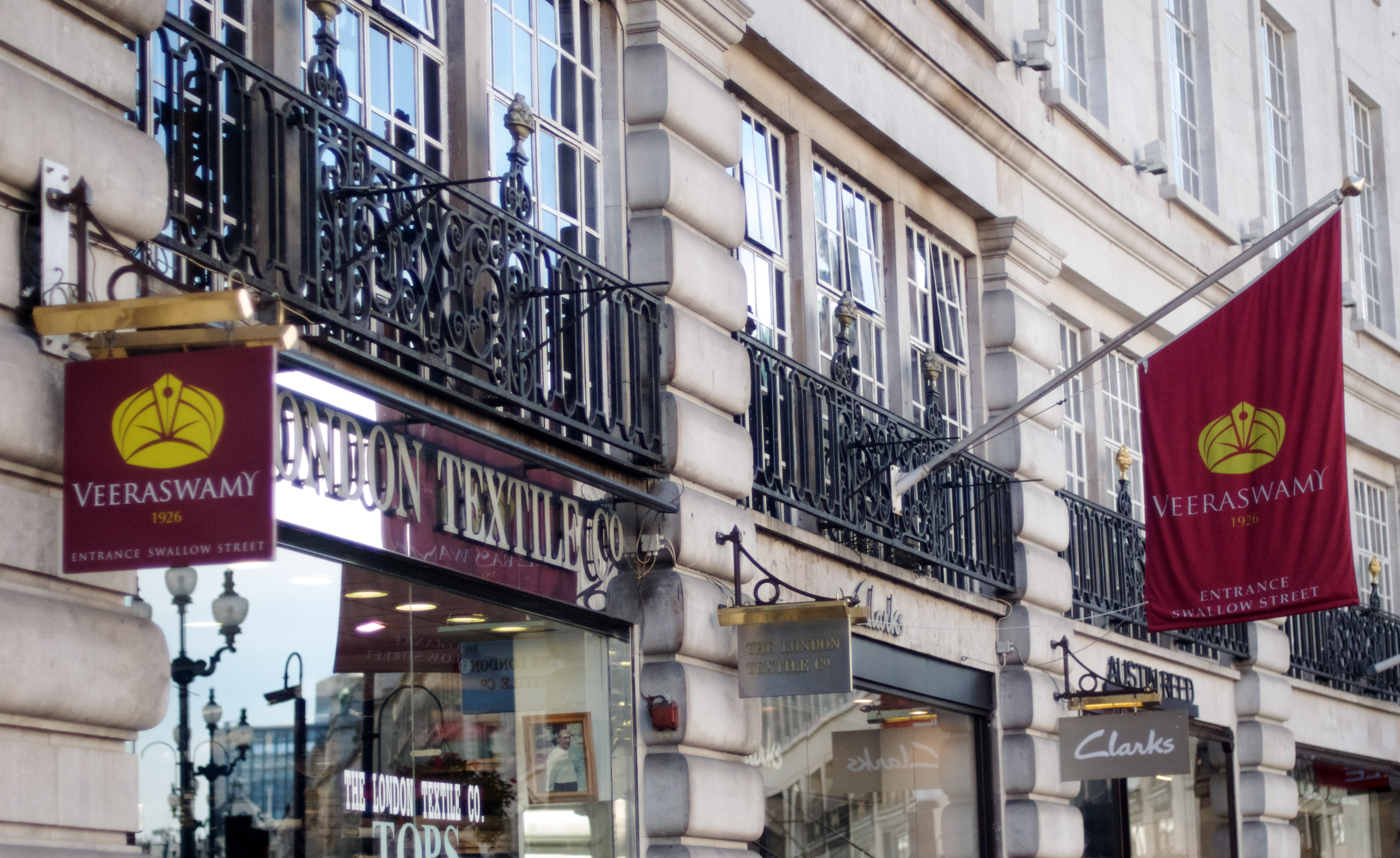
- Interactive map of Veeraswamy

Restaurant information
- Established: 1926
- Owner: Fairfax Financial Holdings
- Food type: Indian
- Rating: (Michelin Guide 2022); AA Rosettes (2026)
- Location: 99–101 Regent Street, City of Westminster, London, W1B 4RS, England
- Website: www.veeraswamy.com

Veeraswamy is an Indian restaurant in London, at 99–101 Regent Street. It was opened in 1926 by Edward Palmer, a retired Anglo-Indian officer in the British Indian Army. By 2006, it had become the oldest Indian restaurant in the United Kingdom. It was awarded a Michelin star in 2016. By 2025, it was under threat of closure.

Palmer's first company, E.P. Veeraswamy & Co., was founded in 1896 as a food ingredients business, not a restaurant, selling Indian foods under the trademark 'Nizam'. In 1924, Palmer advised the restaurant in the Indian Government Pavilion at the British Empire Exhibition in Wembley Park, Middlesex. This led to the founding of the restaurant.

In its early years, Veeraswamy served Anglo-Indian cuisine. In the mid-20th century, it shifted to dishes more familiar to a British clientele such as korma and vindaloo. By the end of the 20th century, it served a menu of regional Indian cuisine, including dishes from Punjab and Kashmir.

== History ==
=== E. P. Veeraswamy & Co., 1896 ===
Edward Palmer was a retired Anglo-Indian officer in the British Indian Army, the grandson of an English general and an Indian princess, Begum Fyze Baksh; a portrait of the family was made by Johann Zoffany. He initially used the name E. P. Veerasawmy (his grandmother's family name) for his food business (selling Indian ingredients) and cookery book; it became Veeraswamy because of a printing error.

Palmer had considerable knowledge of Indian food, and lectured on the subject. He founded his food ingredients business E. P. Veeraswamy & Co. in Hornsey in 1896 to promote Indian foods "so that they could be used under Western conditions and yet produce Eastern results". He sold them under the trademark 'Nizam'. In 1915 Veeraswamy published a recipe book, Indian Cookery for Use in All Countries; it remained in print into the 21st century.

=== The British Empire Exhibition, 1924 ===
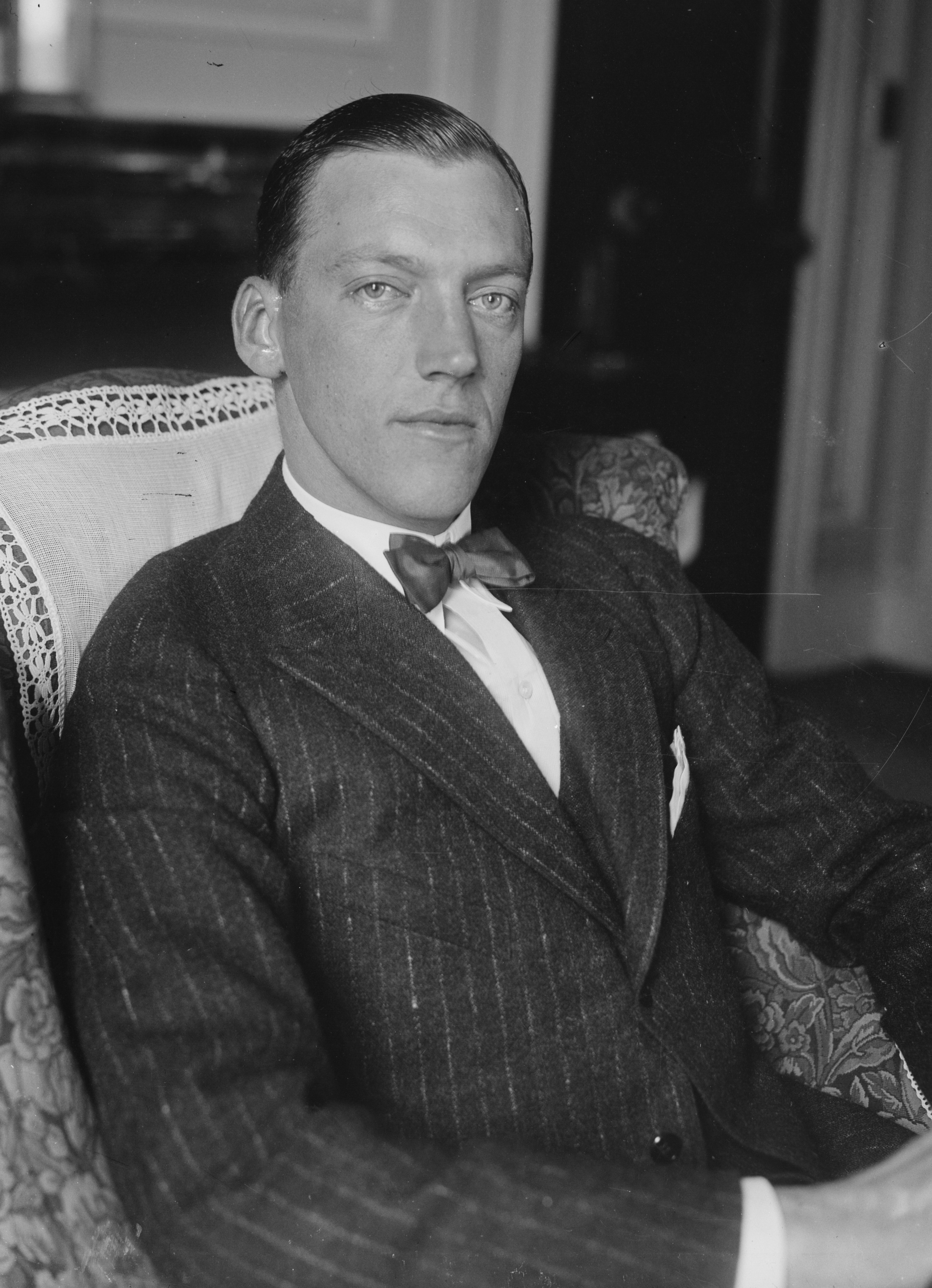
Prince Axel of Denmark may have introduced the drinking of lager with the restaurant's food.

In 1924 Palmer was engaged to advise the restaurant in the Indian Government Pavilion at the British Empire Exhibition in Wembley Park, Middlesex. Palmer estimated the restaurant was producing around 500 curries a day at that time. In 1936, Palmer was brought in by the British Army to teach its cooks how to make curries.

The custom of drinking lager with Indian food may be related to Prince Axel of Denmark's visit to the Veeraswamy-connected Indian restaurant at the British Empire Exhibition on 2 May 1924. He enjoyed his meal and later visited the Regent Street restaurant, apparently bringing a barrel of Carlsberg lager with him. He enjoyed his meal again, and decided to send a barrel of Carlsberg (the Danish royal beer) to the restaurant every year thereafter. The beer proved popular, so the restaurant started importing Carlsberg, and when waiters left to found or work in other Indian restaurants, they served Carlsberg as well. The historian of food Lizzie Collingham comments however that the British had noticed how well beer went with curry as early as 1810.

=== Regent Street restaurant, 1926 ===
"The Veerasawmy" [sic], its name changed to "Veeraswamy" in 1934 through a printing error, opened at 99–101 Regent Street in 1926. It was not the first Indian restaurant to have been founded in Britain, as the Hindoostane Coffee House in Marylebone had been opened by Sake Dean Mahomed in 1810, closing in 1812. Palmer modelled his restaurant on British Raj clubs in India; the menu included such commonly eaten Anglo-Indian dishes as dhansak, dopiaza with fried onions, spicy Madras curry, coloured pulao rice, and hot and sour vindaloo. During the 1930s, the restaurant served Anglo-Indian cuisine using curry powder, without the variety of spicing characteristic of Indian cuisine.

The restaurant was taken over by Sir William Steward in 1934. In 1947, the restaurant's menu described some of its offerings, such as a vegetable curry, tarkari ki salan, as "Indian fare". The food on offer became recognisably more like British Indian restaurant fare in the following years. The menu had acquired dishes such as vindaloo, korma, and poppadums by 1952. Tandoori chicken was on the menu by 1959, once Steward had obtained Britain's first tandoor oven for the restaurant. By the end of the 20th century, as customers sought more authentic Indian food, Veeraswamy served a menu of regional Indian cuisine, including dishes from Punjab and Kashmir.

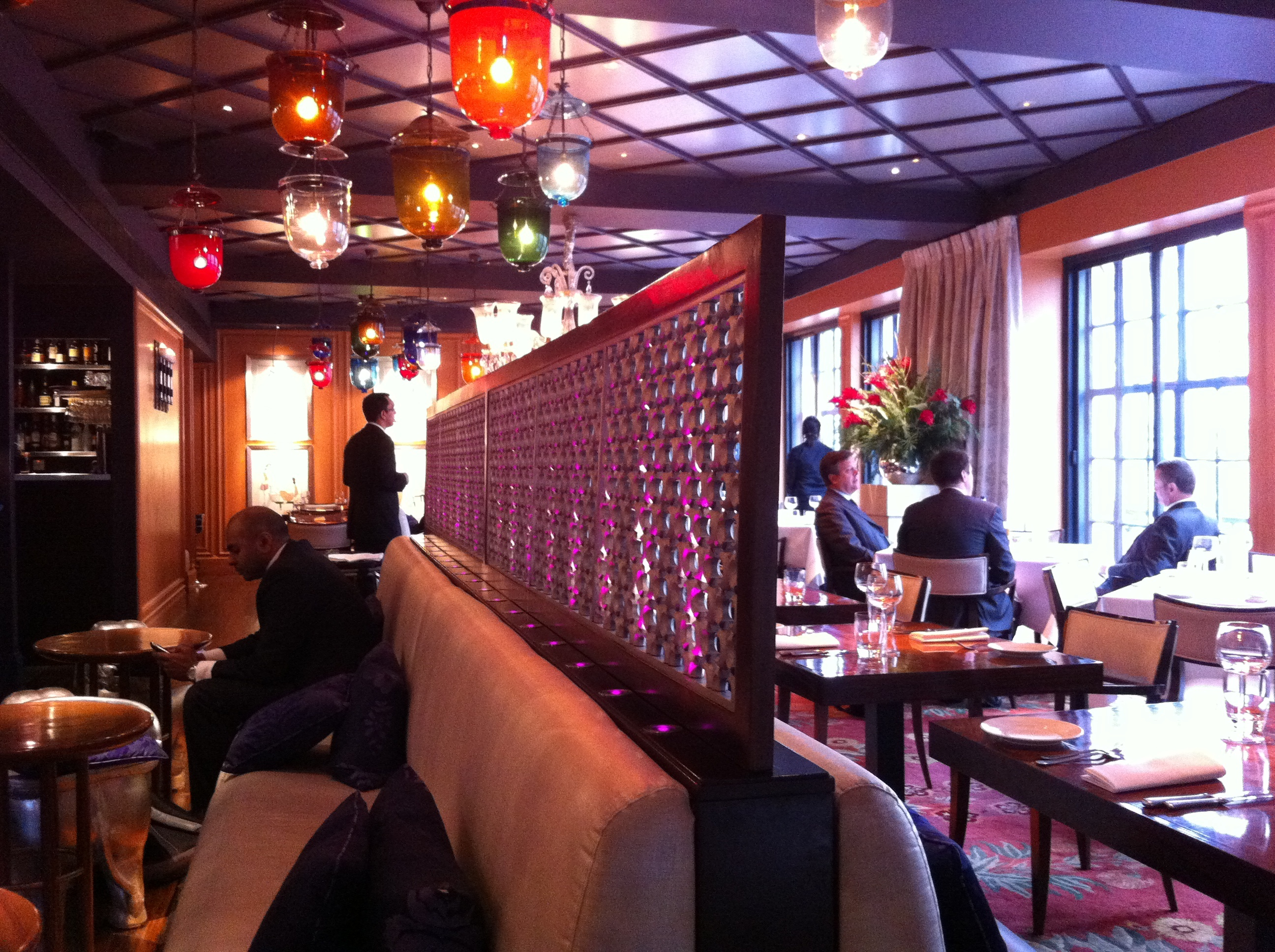
Interior of the restaurant in 2010, back in 1920s style

The restaurant decor was updated repeatedly, with an ultramodern theme in the late 1990s; however, for its 80th anniversary in 2006, it was redecorated in a 1920s motif. Veeraswamy was acquired by the Chutney Mary group in 1997, placing it under the ownership of Ranjit Mathrani and Namitha Panjabi of MW Eat.

Notable diners at Veeraswamy have included Mahatma Gandhi, Winston Churchill, King Gustav VI of Sweden, Jawaharlal Nehru, Indira Gandhi, Charlie Chaplin, Marlon Brando and Ian Sinclair. Sir Abdul Qadir dined at the restaurant in February 1939, when the menu consisted of Mulligatawny Soup, Kashmiri fish, Chicken Madras and suji halva. The restaurant provided catering service at Buckingham Palace twice for Queen Elizabeth II, in 2009 during a visit by the President of India, and in 2017 during the celebration of 70 years of Indian independence.

=== Threat of closure, 2025 ===
In 2025, the restaurant was facing closure because the Crown Estate, owner of Victory House, the Grade II listed building housing Veeraswamy, planned to refurbish and upgrade offices in the building and announced that the restaurant's lease would not be renewed so that changes could be made to the entrance to the building. King Charles III was petitioned to prevent the closure. The lease was set to cease at the end of June 2025, but the restaurant owner initiated legal proceedings against the Crown Estate, allowing the company to continue trading. In November 2025 MW Eat was acquired by Fairfax Financial Holdings. The co-owners, Ranjit Mathrani and Namitha Panjabi, presented the petition at Buckingham Palace in February 2026, accompanied by protesters.

== Reception ==
In 2001, the London evening newspaper The Standard wrote that Veeraswamy had "the most ambitious dishes, the highest level of culinary excellence, and the most modern décor". The review stated that the restaurant had from its foundation been "wildly successful", with a "celebrity clientele until the 1960s". It found the food authentic and "unusually sophisticated", with dishes such as the "spot on" tandoor-baked swordfish with cumin, turmeric, and lemon, or the "awesomely good" achaar gosht with hot chilli and a rich creamy sauce.

In 2016 Veeraswamy was awarded a Michelin star. The Michelin Guide said that it "may have opened in 1926, but the kitchen continues to produce wonderfully authentic and satisfying dishes after all these years. You can expect to find cuisine from all parts of India, including cleverly enhanced street snacks and stand-out dishes inspired by royal recipes. Top quality British produce is often used, such as Welsh lamb for the Kashmiri rogan josh. The room is awash with colour and is run with charm and obvious pride". That same year, Diplomat Magazine called the venison mutta kebab, a dish like a scotch egg made with venison and quail with a tamarind glaze, "a triumph". The Kashmiri rogan josh was "an intensely aromatic curry" and "a firm favourite", while the Kerala prawn curry was "possibly the best curry I have ever tasted".

In 2024, City A.M. tried "all" Veeraswamy's starters, admiring the raj kachori, which combined pomegranate, cream, and "spiced potato innards" and a "gently sweet, moreish chutney". It found the dining room both "cosy" and like "a state room at an Indian Mahal", with extremely friendly staff.

Many early 20th century British Indian restaurants followed Veeraswamy's palatial style of decoration. The San Francisco Indian restaurant India House, founded in 1947 and noted in many guidebooks, was run by a British couple, David and Patricia Brown, who had studied Indian cuisine in England and India; they brought some of Veeraswamy's recipes to America with them.

== See also ==
- List of Indian restaurants
