= Zaika =

Coordinates: 51.5021°N 0.1876°W

- Interactive map of Zaika

Restaurant information
- Established: 1995
- Food type: Indian
- Location: 1 Kensington High Street, London, W8 5NP, United Kingdom
- Website: zaikaofkensington.com

Zaika is an Indian restaurant in Kensington, London. It was founded in 1999 in Chelsea and in 2002, it was relocated to Kensington.

From 2001 to 2004 it held a Michelin star, making it and Tamarind, in Mayfair, the first Indian restaurants to be awarded stars. In 2012, it was taken over and became part of the Tamarind Collection. Shortly after, Zaika was launched as an Italian restaurant; however, this was not successful and in 2013, Zaika reopened once again as an Indian restaurant.

== See also ==
- English cuisine
- list of Indian restaurants
