= Meesha =

Meesha alternatively Meesa may refer to:

- Meesa, a 2018 Malayalam-language novel by S. Hareesh
- Meesha (film), a 2025 Malayalam-language film.
- Meesha (restaurant), an Indian restaurant.

== See also ==
- Meesa Madhavan, a 2002 Malayalam-language film.
- Meesha Shafi, a Pakistani-born Canadian singer, actress and model.
- Meesha Ghoshal, an Indian actress
- Meeshay, a Burmese cuisine dish of rice noodles
