= Kanyakumari (disambiguation) =

Kanyakumari may refer to:

- Kanyakumari (or Cape Comorin), a town in Tamil Nadu, India
  - Kanniyakumari (Lok Sabha constituency)
  - Kanyakumari (State Assembly Constituency)
- Kanyakumari District, a district of Tamil Nadu, India
- Kanyakumari Wildlife Sanctuary, one of the protected areas of Tamil Nadu
- Devi Kanya Kumari, tutelary Hindu goddess of the town
  - Kanyakumari (film), Indian Malayalam film released in 1974
  - Devi Kanyakumari (film), Indian Malayalam film released in 1974
- A. Kanyakumari, a female Carnatic music violinist from Chennai
- Kanyakumari (restaurant), a restaurant in New York City
