= Swagat =

Restaurant chain in the United States

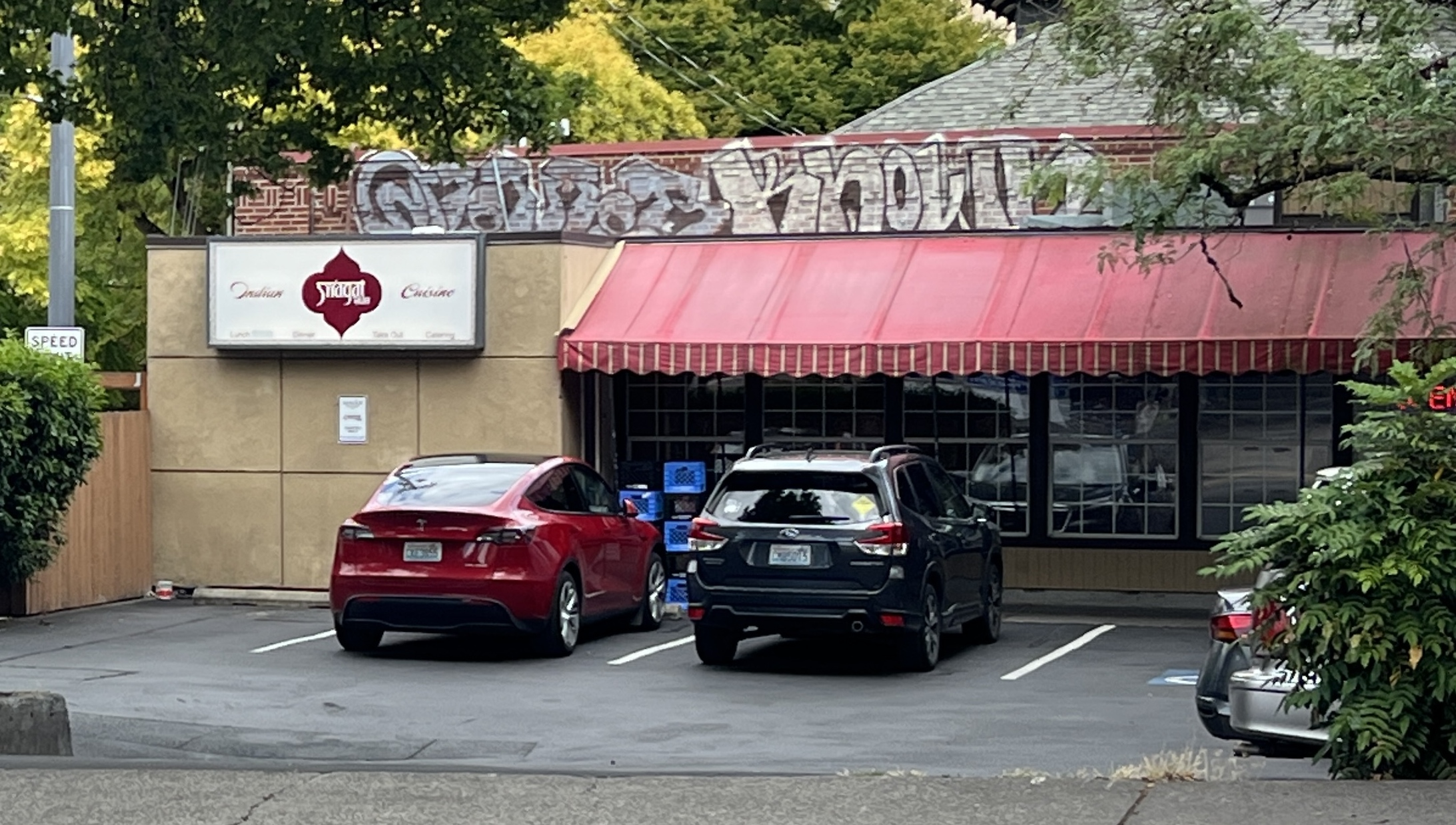
- Exterior of the restaurant in northwest Portland, Oregon, in 2025

Restaurant information
- Owner: Srimanth Chinnam
- Food type: Indian
- Location: Portland; Beaverton; Hillsboro, Oregon, United States
- Website: swagat.com

Swagat is a small chain of Indian restaurants in the Portland metropolitan area, in the U.S. state of Oregon. The business operates in northwest Portland, Beaverton, and Hillsboro, and has also operated in Concord, Milpitas, and Stockton, in California.

== Description ==
The restaurant chain Swagat serves Indian cuisine in the Portland metropolitan area, operating in northwest Portland, Beaverton, and Hillsboro. Swagat has also operated in Concord, Milpitas, and Stockton, in California. All three Oregon locations have hosted lunch buffets and offer take-out. The Portland restaurant is located at the intersection of 21st Avenue and Lovejoy Street in the Northwest District. It shares a bathroom and parking lot with a Laughing Planet restaurant. The Hillsboro location has high ceilings, wooden archways, and copper serving bowls.

Swagat focuses on South Indian cuisine and offers North Indian options as well. Lunch options include chicken, goat, dal curry, palak paneer, pakora, rice, and naan. The dinner menu includes lamb saag, masala dosa, spinach pakora, and vegetable biryani. Desserts include gulab jamun and rice kheer. Swagat has also served aloo gobi, chicken makhani, and lamb vindaloo.

== History ==
Srimanth Chinnam is the owner of Swagat. In Oregon, the Beaverton location opened in 1992. In California, the Stockton location opened in 2009. In 2011, the Portland location hosted a viewing party of the 2011 Cricket World Cup final in Mumbai between India and Sri Lanka. Chinnam opened the Hillsboro restaurant because "a lot of Indian people, high-tech people, working there couldn't come to Beaverton during their lunch breaks". Upon the arrival of the COVID-19 pandemic in 2020, Chinnam laid off approximately 20 of 50 employees working at three locations.

== Reception ==
Michael Russell ranked Swagat second in The Oregonian's 2019 overview of the metropolitan area's best Indian buffets. He called the northwest location "stately" and the two other locations "equally glorious". He opined, "If you don't like Swagat's buffet, most Indian buffets probably aren't for you." Russell recommended the red-black tandoori chicken and suggested passing on the vegetable pakoras. He also ranked Swagat second in an overview of Portland's "bargain" buffets. Swagat won in the best Indian restaurant category of the newspaper's annual Readers Choice Awards in 2024. Rebecca Roland and Ron Scott included Swagat in Eater Portland's 2024 overview of the city's best Indian cuisine. Roland included the business in the same list in 2025.

== See also ==
- List of Indian restaurants
- List of restaurant chains in the United States
