= Annapurna Cafe =

Restaurant in Seattle, Washington, U.S.

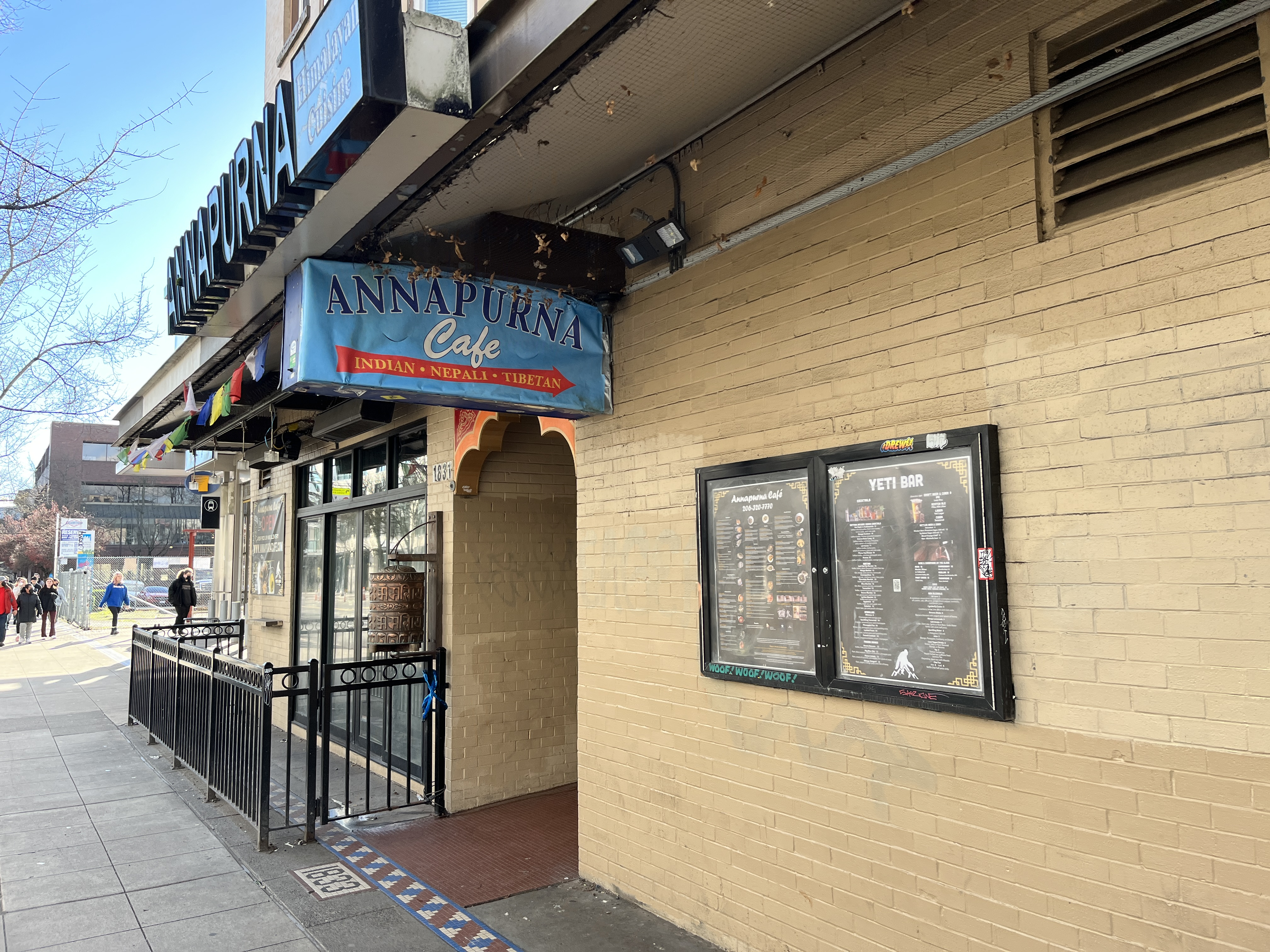
- Exterior of the restaurant, 2023
- Interactive map of Annapurna Cafe

Restaurant information
- Food type: Indian; Nepalese; Tibetan
- Location: 1833 Broadway, Seattle, King, Washington, 98122, United States
- Coordinates: 47°37′7″N 122°19′16″W

Annapurna Cafe is a restaurant in Seattle, in the U.S. state of Washington.

== Description ==
The business serves Indian, Nepalese, and Tibetan cuisine. The menu has included momo with chicken, tomato, mint, and peanut chutneys, as well as fish korma, stewed lamb, palak paneer, and tikka masala. According to Eater Seattle, "the [spinach momo] dumplings are vegan, filled with spinach and aromatic spices. They come with peanut (slightly spicy), sesame (slightly sweet), and tomato (slightly tangy) chutney sauces, offering a variety of flavors to enjoy."

== History ==
Annapurna is owned by chef Roshita Shreshta. The restaurant expanded with the Yeti Bar in 2015.

== Reception ==
Lonely Planet says, "One of the Hill's most engaging dining experiences is this subterranean Nepalese restaurant on Broadway whose extensive menu mixes in a few Indian and Tibetan varietals as well. There are soups, thalis (platters of small dishes), curries, breads and plenty of vegetarian options. It’s busy (good sign), but service is quick and efficient." In 2012, Seattle Weekly selected the restaurant for "Best Indian Food in Seattle".

Eater Seattle included the restaurant in a 2013 overview of "Where to Take Vegetarians Out to Eat in Seattle" and said: "Here, some incredible options for just about everyone. With eight vegan entree options and a Vegetable Kofta at least one person (probably) described as their preferred last meal on earth, it's reasonable to say this would be a killer dinner destination." The website included Annapurna in a 2021 overview of "Fantastic Frozen and Freshly Made Dumplings in the Seattle Area". Jay Friedman included the business in a 2022 list of "10 Spots for Superb Asian Dumplings in the Seattle Area".

== See also ==
- List of Indian restaurants
