= Mirisata =

Sri Lankan restaurant in Portland, Oregon, U.S.

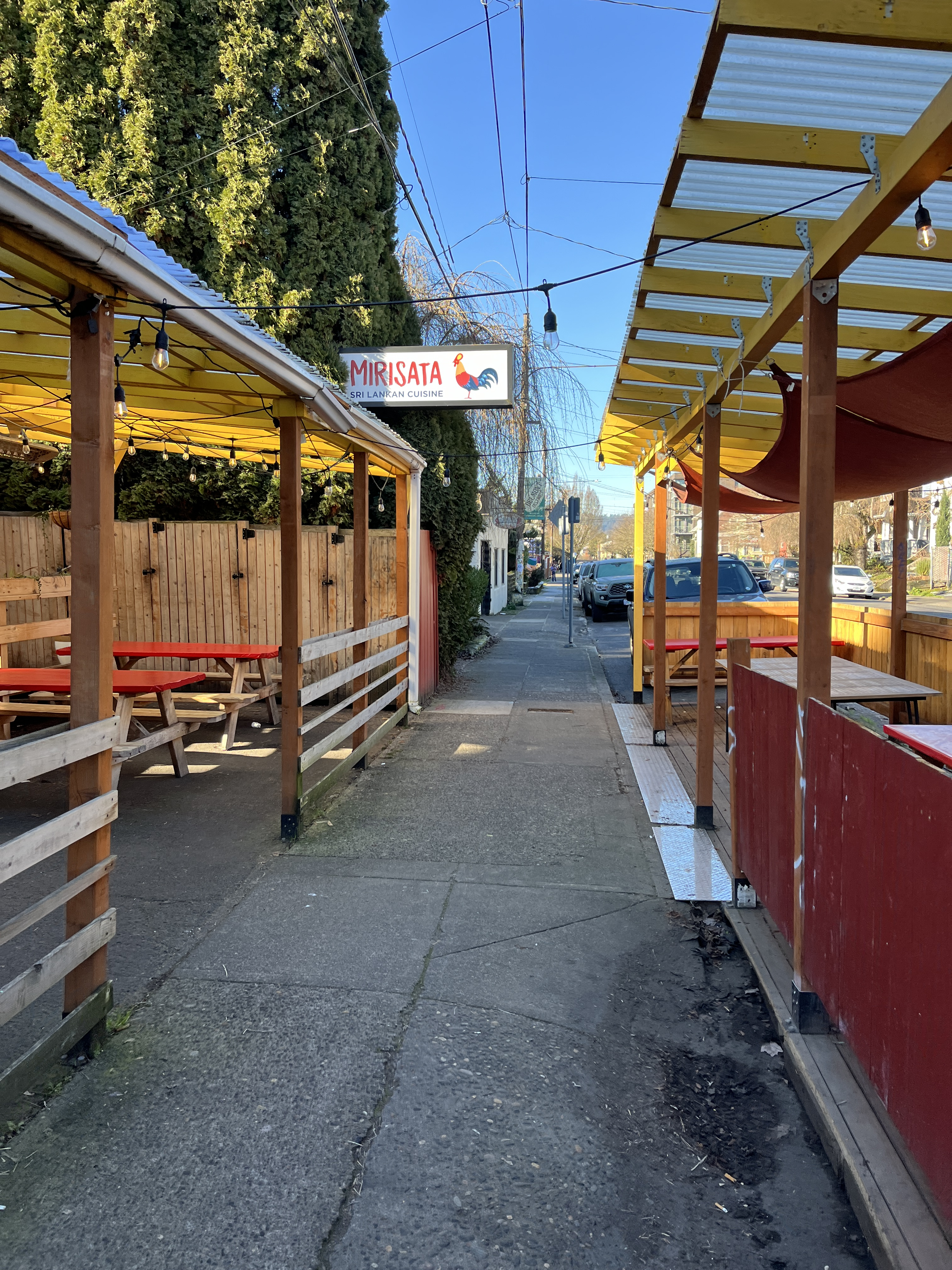
- The restaurant's exterior and outdoor seating in 2025
- Interactive map of Mirisata

Restaurant information
- Established: 2020
- Food type: Sri Lankan; vegan
- Location: 2420 Southeast Belmont Street, Portland, Multnomah, Oregon, 97214, United States
- Coordinates: 45.5163°N 122.6410°W
- Website: mirisata.com

Mirisata is a Sri Lankan restaurant in Portland, Oregon, United States. It is the state's first Sri Lankan restaurant. When it began operating in 2020, it was one of the city's few worker-owned restaurants and, according to the Sri Lankan newspaper The Morning, it is the world's first fully-vegan Sri Lankan restaurant. Mirisata started as a series of pop-ups before opening a brick-and-mortar location in southeast Portland's Buckman neighborhood. The restaurant has garnered a positive reception; it is considered one of Portland's best vegan restaurants. VegNews has included Mirisata in an overview of the best vegan Asian restaurants in North America.

== Description ==
Mirisata is a worker-owned, counter-service Sri Lankan restaurant that operates on Belmont Street in southeast Portland's Buckman neighborhood. The business, which is structured as a worker cooperative, offers food delivery, outdoor dining, and take-out service. It has a covered patio. The restroom is accessible via a working kitchen. The restaurant's junglefowl logo was designed by Sri Lankan illustrator Suprabha Irugalratne.

=== Menu ===
The restaurant's vegan menu includes curries, fried rice, rotis, and sambal. Curry dishes have ingredients such as chili peppers, coconut, eggplant, dal, jackfruit, lotus root, and mustard seeds. Among Sri Lankan Chinese dishes is deviled soy curl "pork" stir-fried with banana pepper that is served over fried rice. Brunch options include banana bread, rice cakes with coconut milk, deviled potatoes, egg-and-vegetable scrambles, hoppers, breakfast sausage by Impossible Foods, and mimosas with passionfruit.

== History ==
Mirisata opened in 2020 as Portland's first and only Sri Lankan pop-up restaurant. The business is co-owned by three BIPOC workers. In 2020, Mirisata started a dinner series at the vegan South American restaurant Epif, until the arrival of the COVID-19 pandemic. Mirisata continued operating via take-out and built a following during the pandemic.

In September 2020, the business announced plans to open a brick-and-mortar restaurant on Belmont Street on October 2, in the space that previously housed Hunt & Gather Catering. Mirisata was Portland's only vegan Sri Lankan restaurant at the time. As of October 2021, Mirisata's owners planned to open a food cart in Hillsboro in December.

Workers at Mirisata unionized in 2022. The Mirisata Workers Union is affiliated with the local chapter of Industrial Workers of the World. In January 2026, the restaurant pledged to close for a day as part of a general strike opposing U.S. Immigration and Customs Enforcement (ICE). In August the same year, a truck ran into the restaurant's outdoor seating structure.

== Reception ==
Mirisata has been included in Eater Portland's overviews of the city's best vegan (and best vegan brunch) restaurants, best vegan curries, and patios for outdoor dining. Margot Bigg included the business in VegNews's 2022 overview of the city's best international vegan cuisine. Writers for the magazine also ranked Mirisata at number 18 in a 2025 list of the best vegan Asian restaurants in North America. In 2026, the magazine's Charlotte Pointing said Mirisata "has taken the city's food scene by storm". The restaurant was ranked second in the "best vegan restaurant" category of The Oregonian's annual Readers Choice Awards in 2025. Michaela Bourgeois included the business in KOIN's 2025 list of Portland's top-ten vegan restaurants, according to Yelp. The same year, Lina Shah of South Asian Herald said the pigeon pea fritters and jackfruit-potato croquettes "left a flavorful impression". Alex Frane and Katherine Chew Hamilton included Mirisata in Portland Monthly's 2026 overview of the city's best vegan restaurants.

== See also ==
- List of vegetarian and vegan restaurants
- Rupee Bar, an Indian and Sri Lankan restaurant in Seattle
