= Rasika (restaurant) =

Indian restaurant in Washington, D.C., U.S.

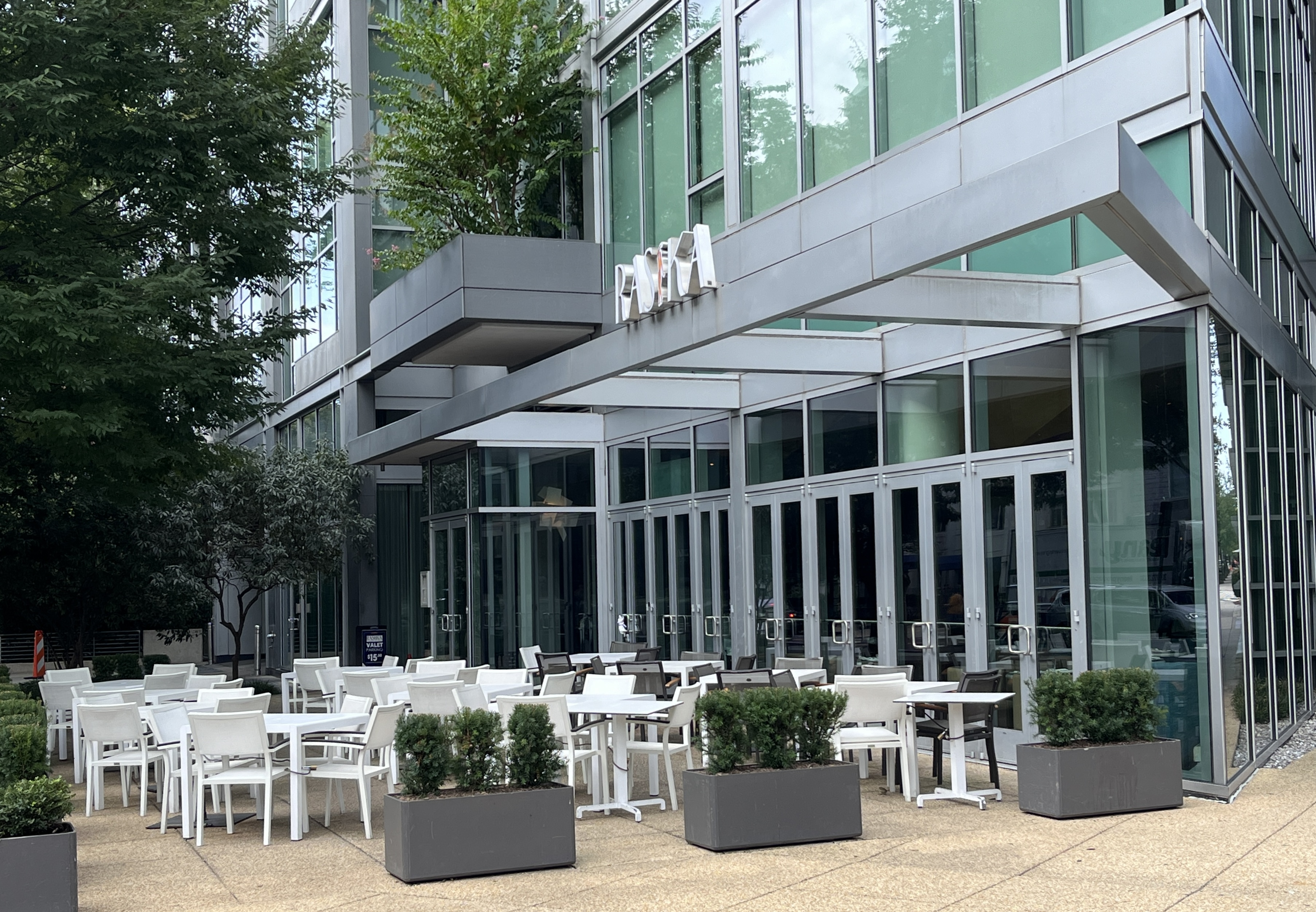
- Exterior of the West End location, 2024
- Interactive map of Rasika

Restaurant information
- Established: 2005
- Owner: Ashok Bajaj
- Food type: Indian
- Location: 633 D Street NW, Washington, D.C., 20004, United States
- Coordinates: 38.8949°N 77.0213°W
- Website: rasikarestaurant.com

Rasika is an Indian restaurant with two locations in Washington, D.C., in the United States. The original restaurant opened in Penn Quarter in 2005; an outpost, sometimes called Rasika West End, opened in West End in 2012.

== Description ==
Rasika has been described as a "groundbreaking" and "modern" Indian restaurant. The most popular dish is palak chaat.

== History ==
The original restaurant opened in Penn Quarter in 2005, and an outpost opened in West End in 2012. Ashok Bajaj is the owner.

Barack Obama celebrated his birthday at the restaurant twice.

== Reception ==
Rasika has been called "one of the most exciting Indian restaurants in the country" by Condé Nast Traveler, and the city's best restaurant by The Washington Post. In 2023, Rasika was included in Washingtonian's overview of the 100 "very best" restaurants, and Tierney Plumb included the business in Eater Washington, D.C.'s list of sixteen "must-try" Indian restaurants in the metropolitan area.

== See also ==
- List of Indian restaurants
