= Vineet Bhatia London =

Coordinates: 51.4916°N 0.1615°W

Vineet Bhatia
- Interactive map of Vineet Bhatia

Restaurant information
- Rating: (Michelin Guide 2017)
- Location: Lincoln Street, London, SW3, United Kingdom
- Other information: Nearest station: Sloane Square

Vineet Bhatia London (formerly Rasoi) was a Michelin-starred Indian restaurant operated by Vineet Bhatia in London, England.

As Rasoi, the restaurant held one star in the Michelin Guide for 12 years. Vineet Bhatia London received a Michelin star on September 21, 2017, and closed one week later, with no explanation beyond a Twitter announcement that "VBL needs to move out for a fresh start".

== See also ==
- List of Indian restaurants
