= Yak and Yeti =

Restaurant chain in the U.S. state of Colorado

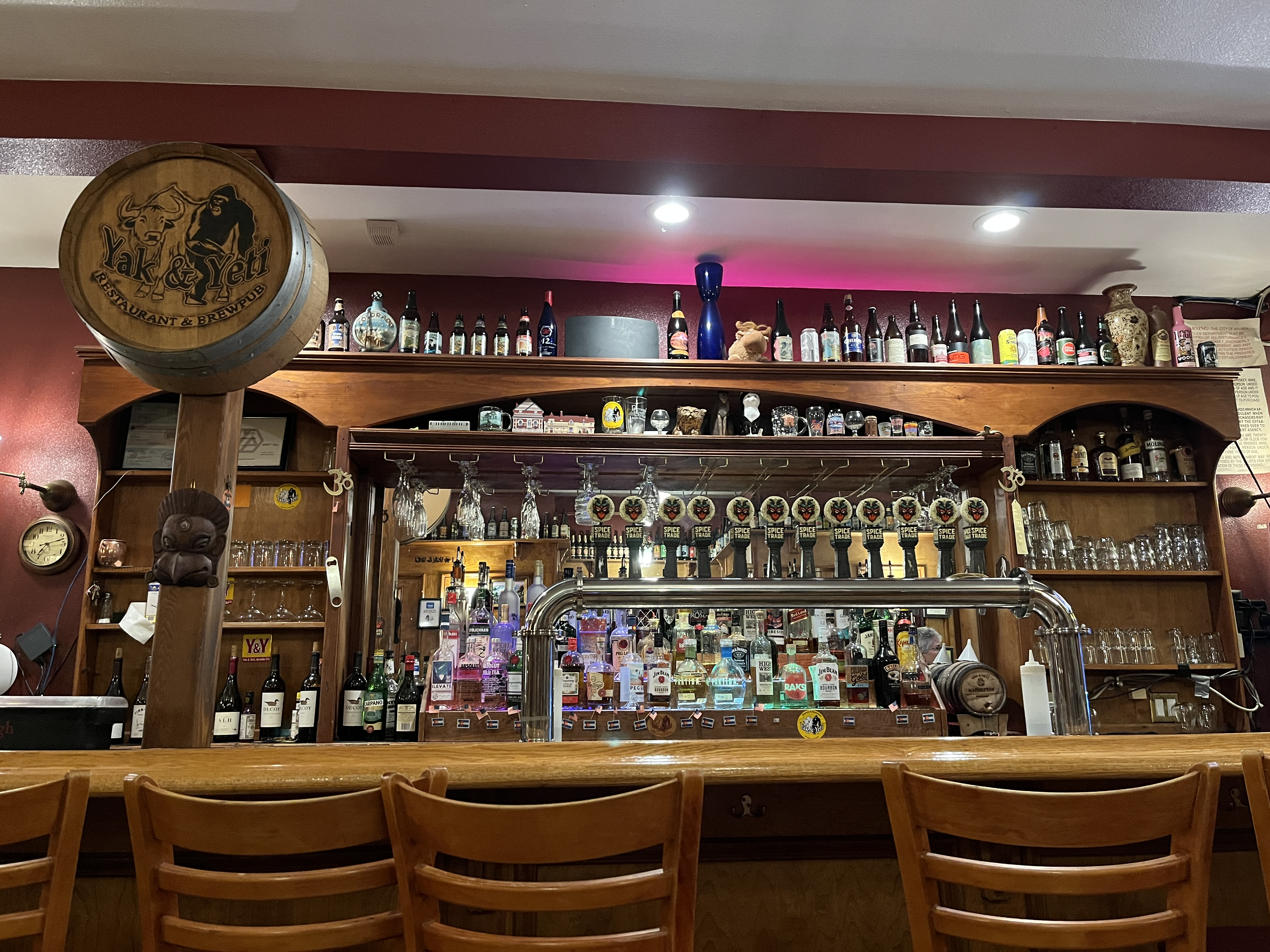
- Interior of the restaurant in Arvada, Colorado, 2025

Restaurant information
- Food type: Himalayan, Indian, Nepalese, and Tibetan
- Location: Multiple locations, Arvada; Westminster; Wheat Ridge, Colorado, United States
- Other locations: 3 (Arvada, Westminster, Wheat Ridge)

Yak and Yeti is a small chain of restaurants and brewpubs in the Denver metropolitan area, Colorado, United States. It operates in Arvada, Westminster, and Wheat Ridge.

== Description ==
The restaurants serve Himalayan, Indian, Nepalese, and Tibetan cuisine. The food menu includes chicken tikka masala, naan, saag paneer, curry dishes, and dumplings. Drink options include beers, chai, mango lassies, and ginger sodas.

The location in Arvada operates in a two-story Queen Anne-style house, built in 1864. It is a reportedly haunted location.

== Reception ==
Erica Buehler included the restaurant in Thrillist's 2022 list of eighteen "essential" AAPI-owned businesses in Denver. DB Kelly selected the business for Colorado in Tasting Table's 2025 list of the best all-you-can-eat buffets in each U.S. state.

== See also ==
- List of Indian restaurants
- List of reportedly haunted locations in the United States
- List of restaurant chains in the United States
