= Khan Saab Desi Craft Kitchen =

Restaurant in Fullerton, California, US

- Interactive map of Khan Saab Desi Craft Kitchen

Restaurant information
- Location: Fullerton, California, United States
- Coordinates: 33.87056°N 117.92048°W
- Website: www.khansaaboc.com

Khan Saab Desi Craft Kitchen is a restaurant in Fullerton, California, United States. It opened in February 2020 and serves Indian, Afghan, and Pakistani cuisine. The restaurant has received Bib Gourmand status in the Michelin Guide.

== See also ==
- List of Indian restaurants
