= Adyar Ananda Bhavan =

Indian vegetarian restaurant chain

Coordinates: 13.0059°N 80.2576°E

Adyar Ananda Bhavan Sweets India Pvt Ltd
- Type: Privately held company
- Industry: Indian restaurant, sweets, snacks, foods, beverages
- Genre: South Indian food, Vegetarian food
- Founded: 1970s
- Founder: K.S. Thirupathi Raja
- Headquarters: Ambattur, Chennai, India
- Number of locations: 165+
- Area served: India, Singapore, Malaysia, Australia, Kenya, United Kingdom, Canada, United States
- Key people: K T Venkatesan; K T Srinivasa Raja
- Products: Indian vegetarian foods and beverages
- Brands: AAB, A2B
- Number of employees: 18,000
- Parent: Bodhi Tree Systems
- Website: www.aabsweets.com

Adyar Ananda Bhavan (also known as AAB or A2B) is an Indian chain of vegetarian restaurants and confectioners founded in Rajapalayam and headquartered in Adyar, Chennai. It has 145+ outlets across India.

== History ==
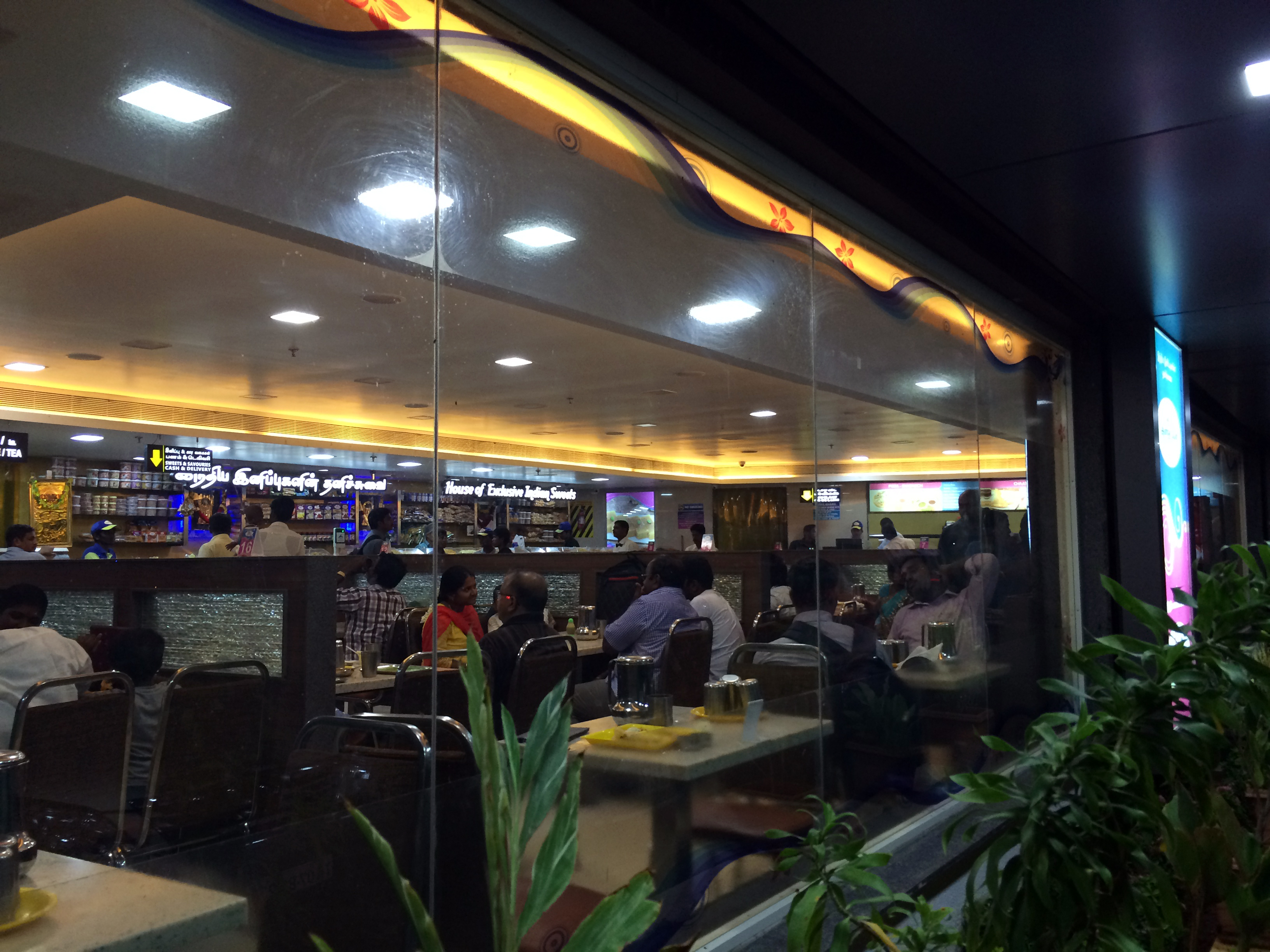
An A2B Restaurant at Maraimalai Nagar, on the outskirts of Chennai

A2B was founded by Thiru K.S. Thirupathi Raja, who was the founder of Guru Sweets in Rajapalayam, Srinivasa Sweets in Bengaluru (Sriramapuram) and Sri Ananda Bhavan in Washermenpet, Chennai. This was followed by the opening of a branch in Adyar which prompted the company to add Adyar to the name Ananda Bhavan which is now called Adyar Ananda Bhavan.

Adyar Ananda Bhavan now operates branches across India, most of which are in southern India.

The restaurant chain is now managed and run by Thiru. K.T. Venkatesan and Thiru. K.T. Srinivasa Raja, sons of founder late Thiru. K.S. Thirupathi Raja.

In November 2026, Adyar Ananda Bhavan sold it's majority stake to Bodhi Tree Systems for $180 million.

== Operations ==
- Started initially with Rajapalayam in 1960s and later expanded to Bengaluru (Malleswaram) in 1978 and Chennai (Royapuram) in 1980.
- Started with the brand name "Ananda Bhavan" and subsequently changed to "Adyar Ananda Bhavan".
- Started in Chennai in 1979 as Sri Ananda Bhavan in Washermanpet by Thirupathi Raja and his elder son K T Venkatesan. In 1988, opened a second outlet in Chennai in Adyar. In 1992 expanded with a third outlet in Purasaiwakkam.
- In 1994, the chain crossed ₹100 crore in turnover.
- Currently more than 10,000 people are employed across its outlets with ₹800 crore in annual turnover.
- In 2000, it expanded to Pondicherry, and reached 20 branches in Chennai with total turnover of ₹150 crores.
- It has branches and outlets in the United States (Herndon VA, San Jose, Dallas and New Jersey), Malaysia and Singapore.
- In 2018, Company launches food delivery app “A2B”.

== Awards ==
- 2018 The Confederation of Indian Industry (CII) Southern Region Entrepreneurs Awards to managing director of Adyar Ananda Bhavan Sweets India Private Limited K.T. Srinivasa Raja.

== See also ==
- List of Indian restaurants
- List of vegetarian restaurants
