= Tamarind Tribeca =

Indian restaurant in New York City, U.S.

- Interactive map of Tamarind Tribeca

Restaurant information
- Established: April 2010
- Owner: Avtar Walia
- Food type: Indian
- Location: 99 Hudson Street, New York City, New York, 10013, United States
- Coordinates: 40°43′9″N 74°0′32″W

Tamarind Tribeca, or simply Tamarind is an Indian restaurant in New York City. The restaurant had received a Michelin star but lost the star in 2015. The restaurant's original location in Flatiron closed after 13 years back in 2013.

== See also ==
- List of Indian restaurants
- List of Michelin-starred restaurants in New York City
