= Spice Waala =

Indian restaurant in Seattle, Washington, U.S.

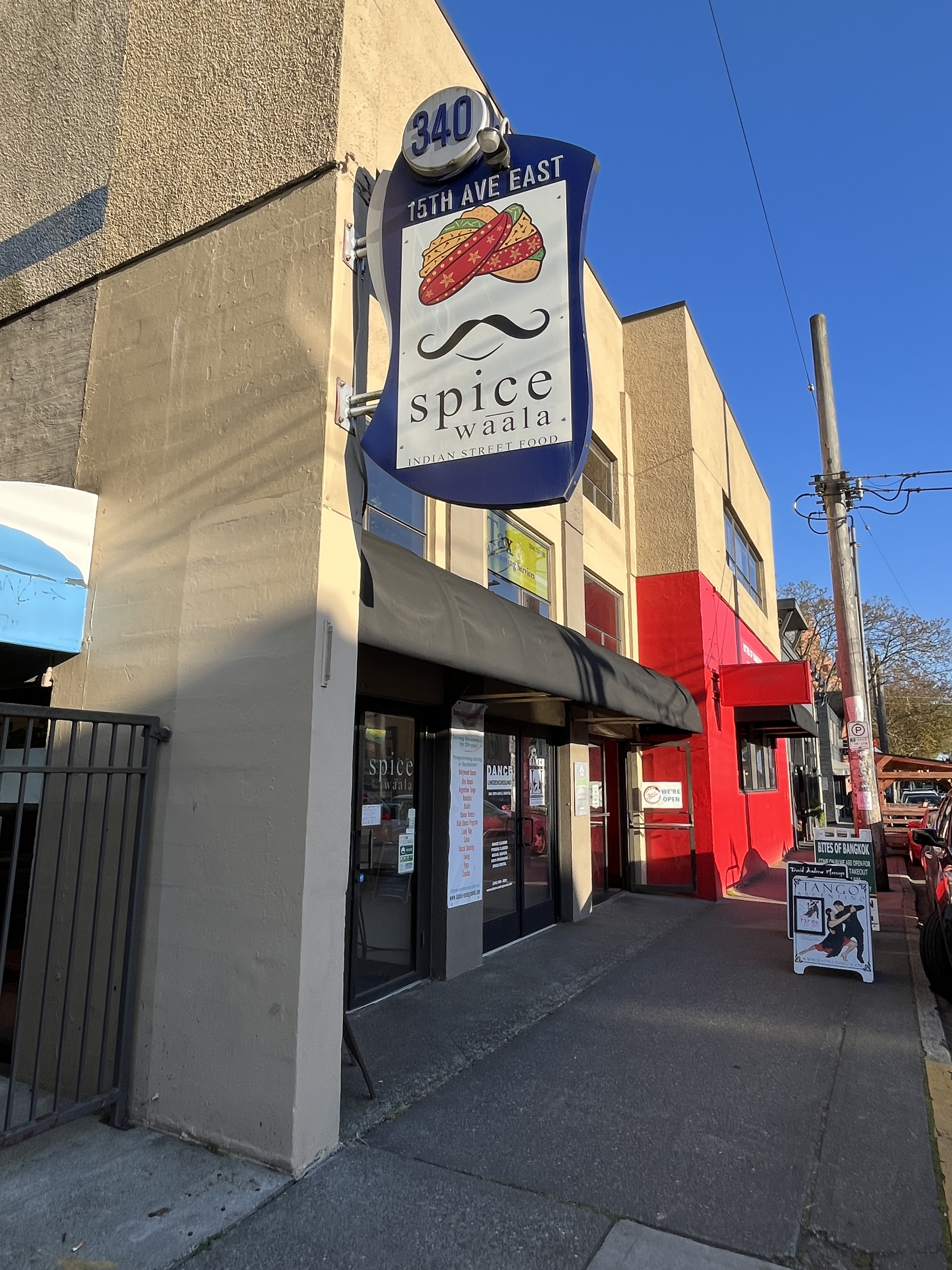
- Exterior of the Capitol Hill restaurant, 2023
- Interactive map of Spice Waala

Restaurant information
- Owners: Uttam Mukherjee; Aakanksha Sinha
- Food type: Indian
- Location: 340 15th Avenue East #202, Seattle, King, Washington, United States
- Coordinates: 47.6217°N 122.3125°W
- Website: spicewaala.com

Spice Waala is an Indian restaurant with two locations in Seattle, Washington. Uttam Mukherjee and Aakanksha Sinha started the business in 2018, initially as a pop-up in Fremont and South Lake Union. The first brick and mortar restaurant opened on Capitol Hill in 2019, followed by a second in Ballard in 2021. Spice Waala's street food offerings have received a positive reception.

== Description ==
Spice Waala serves Indian street food at two locations in Seattle. The menu has included samosas, roti with paneer masala, chicken tikka, and ground lamb as fillings, as well as mango lassi. In 2021, for Holi, the restaurant served a four-course meal with kachoris, daal (lentil stew), puri (thin fried bread), mutton curry (goat curry), pulao (spiced rice), and gujiya.

== History ==
Spice Waala was established by spouses Uttam Mukherjee and Aakanksha Sinha in 2018. The business initially operated pop-ups in Fremont and at the South Lake Union Farmers Market.

The first brick and mortar restaurant opened on Capitol Hill in April 2019, in a space which previously housed Kanak Cuisine of India. A second restaurant with the same menu opened in Ballard in January 2021, in a space which previously housed Boar's Nest. In November 2023, Spice Waala announced plans to expand to Columbia City.

Spice Waala donates meals to the community. Its Bhojan community meals program has provided approximately 17,500 meals as of 2021.

== Reception ==
In 2019, Seattle Refined's Tess Owen wrote, "Spice Waala's success is anything but a surprise. They offer something that can't be found anywhere else on Capitol Hill: cheap, delicious, high-quality Indian food." Naomi Tomky included the business in Thrillist's list of 15 "Pacific Northwest fast food chains the entire country needs" and wrote: "An academic and a brand manager serving up Indian street food with a side of social justice mission might be just the kind of thing that would show up in a parody of Seattle, but it turns out that the lamb kebab kathi roll tastes even better when you know that the employs get fair compensation and the owners make sure to take care of the community as well." Tomky recommended the menu's snack foods the most, especially the papdi chaat and bhel puri.

In 2022, Spice Waala was named Washington's best Indian restaurant by iHeart, and Sinha was included in the Puget Sound Business Journal's "40 Under 40" list. Leonardo David Raymundo, Maggy Lehmicke, and Jade Yamazaki Stewart included the business in Eater Seattle's 2022 list of 17 "incredible" Indian and South Asian restaurants in the Seattle metropolitan area. In 2023, Stewart and Sophie Grossman included the business in a list of 21 "essential" Capitol Hill restaurants, and Seema magazine included Spice Waala in a list of Seattle's 15 best Indian restaurants. Grossman later included the business in Eater Seattle's 2025 overview of the best restaurants on Capitol Hill.

== See also ==
- List of Indian restaurants
