= Appu's Cafe =

Restaurant in California

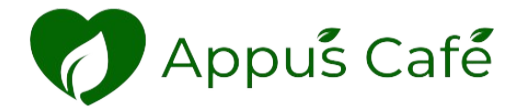

- Location within the Los Angeles metropolitan area Appu's Cafe (California) Appu's Cafe (the United States)

Restaurant information
- Established: 2013
- Owner: Vinod "V.R." Venkataraman
- Food type: Healthy
- Location: 3816 Woodruff Ave Suite 100B, Long Beach, CA 90808
- Coordinates: 33.8281°N 118.1154°W
- Website: www.appuscafe.us

Appu's Cafe is a Mexican-Indian restaurant in Long Beach, California serving healthy foods. It was founded in 2013 and is located on the ground floor of a medical building. It frequently appears on Yelp's annual Top 100 U.S. Restaurants list, placing 12th in the 2023 edition.

== History ==
Vinod "V.R." Venkataraman was a jazz drummer in his homeland of India. After studying math, he went to medical school and moved to the United States to start his own business. While starting his practice in the U.S., Venkataraman dipped his feet into art, started a family, performed in many venues, and spoke at colleges such as the Berklee College of Music about the similarities between his medical work and drumming. He retired in 2013 and opened Appu's Cafe at Woodruff Medical Center, where his wife still works. It opened a second location in June 2023, with more parking space and a larger kitchen.

== Menu ==
The restaurant's menu is of its founder, V.R.'s, creation. He wanted to mix dishes from his Indian heritage with vegetarian recipes from other cultures. Most of the recipes are seasonal and change to each illness that becomes common during that time. Soups include a vegan mushroom soup, minestra di ceci, lentil soup, maharani soup (a combination of the former two), and spinach soup. Indian-Mexican fusions consist of burritos and tacos filled with Indian foods. It also has paneer and mushroom tikka masala, saag paneer, mango lassi, cinnamon crisps, grass chai, gulab jamun, and Indian flatbread.

Appu's Cafe is popular with building staff as it is the only nearby place serving coffee.

== See also ==
- List of Indian restaurants
