= Vineet Bhatia =

British chef of Indian origin, restaurateur, author (born 1967)

Vineet Bhatia MBE MBE
- Bhatia at his london restaurant
- Born: 9 December 1967 (age 58); Mumbai, India
- Education: The Oberoi School of Hotel Management
- Spouse: Rashima Bhatia
- Children: 2
- Culinary career
- Cooking style: Modern Indian
- Website: vineetbhatia.com

Vineet Bhatia MBE (born 9 December 1967) is a British chef, restaurateur, author, and media personality. He was the first ever chef of Indian origin to receive a Michelin star. He opened two Rasoi restaurants, the first in Chelsea, London in 2004, and the second in Geneva, Switzerland, in 2008. Both restaurants received Michelin stars, in 2006 and 2009 respectively. Currently, he has eleven restaurants, including his signature restaurant "KAMA by Vineet" in the dining hall in Harrods in London, and appears as a judge on Netflix show The Final Table and judge-host on MasterChef India. He has written two cookbooks, Rasoi: New Indian Kitchen and My Sweet Kitchen.

In 2021, Vineet was appointed as culinary Ambassador for United Kingdom of Great Britain & Northern Ireland campaign and at the start of 2023 was awarded an MBE.

== Early life ==
Born in 1967, Vineet Bhatia grew up in Mumbai. He had early ambitions of becoming a pilot since a young age, growing up with daily sounds of planes flying into the nearby Juhu Airport. At the age of 17, having passed the National Defence Exam to join the Air Force he failed to do the same with the required physical test. After this failure Bhatia turned to cooking, inspired by his mother's passion for it.

== Career ==
Bhatia was recruited as a trainee to the Oberoi School of Hotel Management, New Delhi in 1988 where he trained until 1990. He went on to work as Chef de Cuisine at The Oberoi from 1990 to 1993.

He moved to London in 1993, taking on the position of Executive Chef at Star of India, South Kensington. Restaurant critic Fay Maschler of the Evening Standard wrote of him at the time, "Bhatia has lifted the cooking into a new league; providing convincing proof that Indian food is capable of evolving".

In 1998 he and Iqbal Wahhab opened Cinnamon Club, before heading up the kitchen at "Vineet Bhatia" in Hammersmith the following year. AA Gill wrote: "It's shaming to point out, but if Bhatia cooked in the French or Italian vernacular, or came from New York, he would be hailed as a superchef".

Bhatia went on to establish Zaika in 1999, and in 2001 became the first chef of Indian origin to be awarded a Michelin Star and that too in London. He spent a further three years at Zaika before going on his own in 2004 at Rasoi in Chelsea. Critics expected the restaurant to earn a Michelin star soon after opening, and in 2006 it was awarded the second Michelin Star received by Bhatia. Shortly after, he opened Rasoi by Vineet in Geneva, Switzerland. In 2009 the restaurant received a Michelin Star, making Bhatia the only Indian origin 2-star Michelin chef, and one of the few British chefs to have Michelin Stars in more than one country.

In 2011 he hosted a Travel Food Show on "Fox Traveller titled Twist of Taste with Vineet Bhatia. In the show, he travelled across India and gave traditional and popular Indian dishes a makeover.

He opened his restaurant Saffron Lounge in Doha, Qatar, in 2012, alongside his established restaurant in Dubai, Indego. In the same year of this opening Bhatia was also appointed as a culinary ambassador for Qatar Airways to create a new in-flight dining experience. In 2015 he opened his first restaurant in Saudi Arabia, "Maharaja by Vineet" in the Mövenpick Hotel Al Khobar, Saudi Arabia. After two years of operation, Maharaja was awarded the best Indian restaurant at the Food & Travel Arabia awards.

In late 2016, Bhatia re-modelled his original restaurant Rasoi in Chelsea, launching Vineet Bhatia London, or VBL for short. Bhatia's plan for VBL was to offer only a multi-course tasting menu. In October 2017, it was awarded a Michelin Star. However, following a disagreement with his partners at VBL, Bhatia decided to close the restaurant and re-focus his efforts elsewhere.

In 2019, KAMA by Vineet, in London, opened in the newly refurbished dining hall at Harrods, making him the only Michelin starred chef at the London department store.

In the same year, it was also announced that Bhatia would be joining the 6th edition of MasterChef India as Judge Host.

In 2021, Bhatia was appointed as culinary Ambassador for GREAT Britain & Northern Ireland campaign.

Bhatia was appointed Member of the Order of the British Empire (MBE) in the 2023 New Year Honours for services to hospitality and international trade.

== Social Work ==
Bhatia has been involved in a series of charitable and social events.

Bhatia has long been championing efforts to bring sustainability into the spotlight in the culinary world. With his recent appointment as a GREAT ambassador to the United Kingdom he has been at the heart of the campaign’s efforts to encourage gastronomical sustainability. Bhatia recently filmed a feature with Dubai One at Expo 2020 Dubai where he toured various pavilions to gather inspiration from their sustainable installations to curate a dish based on their regional offerings.

Bhatia’s other social work has also been centred around moulding the next generation and being a source of inspiration. In anticipation of Prince William’s arrival at the UK’s country day celebrations at Expo 2020 Dubai, Bhatia gave students from Gems schools a behind the scenes look into his preparations for the celebratory reception.

This year Bhatia was invited to Jumeirah College alongside Simon Penney, His Majesty’s Trade Commissioner for the Middle East and His Majesty’s Consul General to Dubai and the Northern Emirates to host their 75th annual bake-off in memory of Her Majesty Queen Elizabeth II and for their student development activities program.

== Restaurants ==
| Restaurant | Location | Years | Rating |
|---|---|---|---|
| Star of India | London, United Kingdom | 1993 - 1998 | |
| Zaika | London, United Kingdom | 1999 - 2004 | 1 Michelin star |
| Safran | Belle Mare, Mauritius | 2002 - 2006 | |
| Tantra | Los Angeles, United States of America | 2002 - 2007 | |
| Rasoi | London, United Kingdom | 2004 - 2016 | 1 Michelin star |
| Indego | Dubai, United Arab Emirates | 2005–Present | |
| Indus | Moscow, Russia | 2006 - 2010 | |
| Urban Turban | London, United Kingdom | 2008 - 2010 | |
| Maharaja | Al Khobar, Saudi Arabia | 2008–Present | |
| Rasoi | Geneva, Switzerland | 2008 - 2021 | 1 Michelin star |
| B.I.R.D | Leeds, United Kingdom | 2008 - 2013 | |
| Saffron Lounge | Doha, Qatar | 2009 - 2018 | |
| Ziya | The Oberoi, Mumbai, India | 2010–Present | |
| Dhilli | The Oberoi, New Delhi, India | 2023–Present | |
| Amari | Belle Mare, Mauritius | 2014–Present | |
| Maharaja East | Riyadh, Saudi Arabia | 2015–Present | |
| Rasoi | Manama, Bahrain | 2015–Present | |
| Vineet Bhatia London | London, United Kingdom | 2016 - 2018 | 1 Michelin star |
| Indego 360 | Doha, Qatar | 2018 - 2021 | |
| Rasoi | Jeddah, Saudi Arabia | 2019–Present | |
| Indya | Dubai, United Arab Emirates | 2019–Present | |
| KAMA | London, United Kingdom | 2019–Present | |

== Notable Events ==
| Event | Location | Year |
|---|---|---|
| Ponant Cruise - Q Experiences | The Arctic | 2022 |
| Expo 2020 UK National Day | Dubai, U.A.E. | 2022 |
| HMS Queen Elizabeth II | Indian Ocean | 2021 |
| HMS Defender | Mumbai, India | 2021 |
| Ponant Cruise - Q Experiences | Antarctica | 2019 - 2022 |
| Reingau Wine & Food Festival | Rheingau, Germany | 2016, 2017, 2019 |
| Base Camp Dining Experience | Mount Everest, Nepal | 2018 |
| City Meals | New York City, U.S.A. | 2018 |
| Umaid Bhavan's Palace | Jodhpur, India | 2018 |
| Heart for India | Geneva, Switerzerland | 2018 |
| San Sebastian Gastronomica | San Sebastian, Spain | 2017 |
| Indian Embassy | Paris, France | 2016 |
| Hangar 7 | Salzburg, Austria | 2015 |
| Constance Ophelia Hotel | Seychelles | 2015 |
| Palace of Versailles | Versailles, France | 2015 |
| Dinner in the Sky | Doha, Qatar | 2014 |
| Château St Martin | Côte d’Azur, France | 2014 |
| Taste of Dubai | Dubai, U.A.E. | 2006 - 2013 |
| U.S. Trade Counsel Dinner | Al Khobar, Saudi Arabia | 2012 |
| St. Moritz Gourmet Summit | St. Moritz, Switzerland | 2008, 2009, 2011 |
| Abu Dhabi World Gourmet Summit | Abu Dhabi, U.A.E. | 2010 |
| London Eye Dining Experience | London, England | 2009 |
| World Gourmet Summit | St Moritz, Switzerland | 2009 |
| Madrid Fusion | Madrid, Spain | 2008 |
| Taste of London | London, England | 2002 - 2004 |

== Books ==
Bhatia has written two cookbooks:

- Rasoi : New Indian Kitchen, 2009, ISBN 978-1906650193
- My Sweet Kitchen, 2016, ISBN 978-0995543102
