= Rupee Bar =

Restaurant in Seattle, Washington, U.S.

- Interactive map of Rupee Bar

Restaurant information
- Food type: Indian; Sri Lankan
- Location: 6307 24th Avenue Northwest, Ballard, Seattle, Washington, 98107, United States
- Coordinates: 47°40′29.5″N 122°23′16″W
- Website: rupeebar.com

Rupee Bar is an Indian and Sri Lankan restaurant located in Seattle's Ballard neighborhood, in the U.S. state of Washington. It was awarded the James Beard Foundation Award in the Best Design category.

== See also ==
- James Beard Foundation Award: 2020s
- List of Indian restaurants
- Mirisata, a Sri Lankan restaurant in Portland, Oregon
