= Indian-Nepali Kitchen =

Restaurant in Seattle, Washington, U.S.

- Interactive map of Indian-Nepali Kitchen

Restaurant information
- Food type: Indian; Nepalese
- Location: 13754 Aurora Avenue N, Seattle, King, Washington, United States
- Coordinates: 47°43′48″N 122°20′41″W
- Website: indiannepalikitchen.com

Indian-Nepali Kitchen is an Indian and Nepalese restaurant in Seattle, Washington, United States.

== Description ==
The restaurant serves Indian and Nepalese cuisine. The dining room is colored black and red. The menu includes biryanis, momos, and aloo rayoko saag.

== Reception ==
The business was included in The Infatuation's list of the top-rated new restaurants of 2024. The website's Aimee Rizzo also included the restaurant in an overview of Seattle's best dumplings. Indian-Nepali Kitchen was included in Eater Seattle's 2024 list of the best South Asian restaurants in the metropolitan area, as well as Seattle Metropolitan magazine's 2024 overview of the city's best new restaurants.

== See also ==
- List of Indian restaurants
