= Bhuna (restaurant) =

Indian restaurant in Portland, Oregon, U.S.

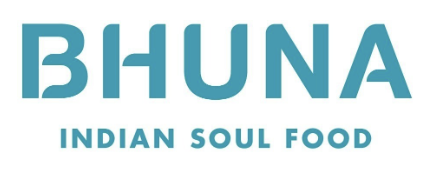

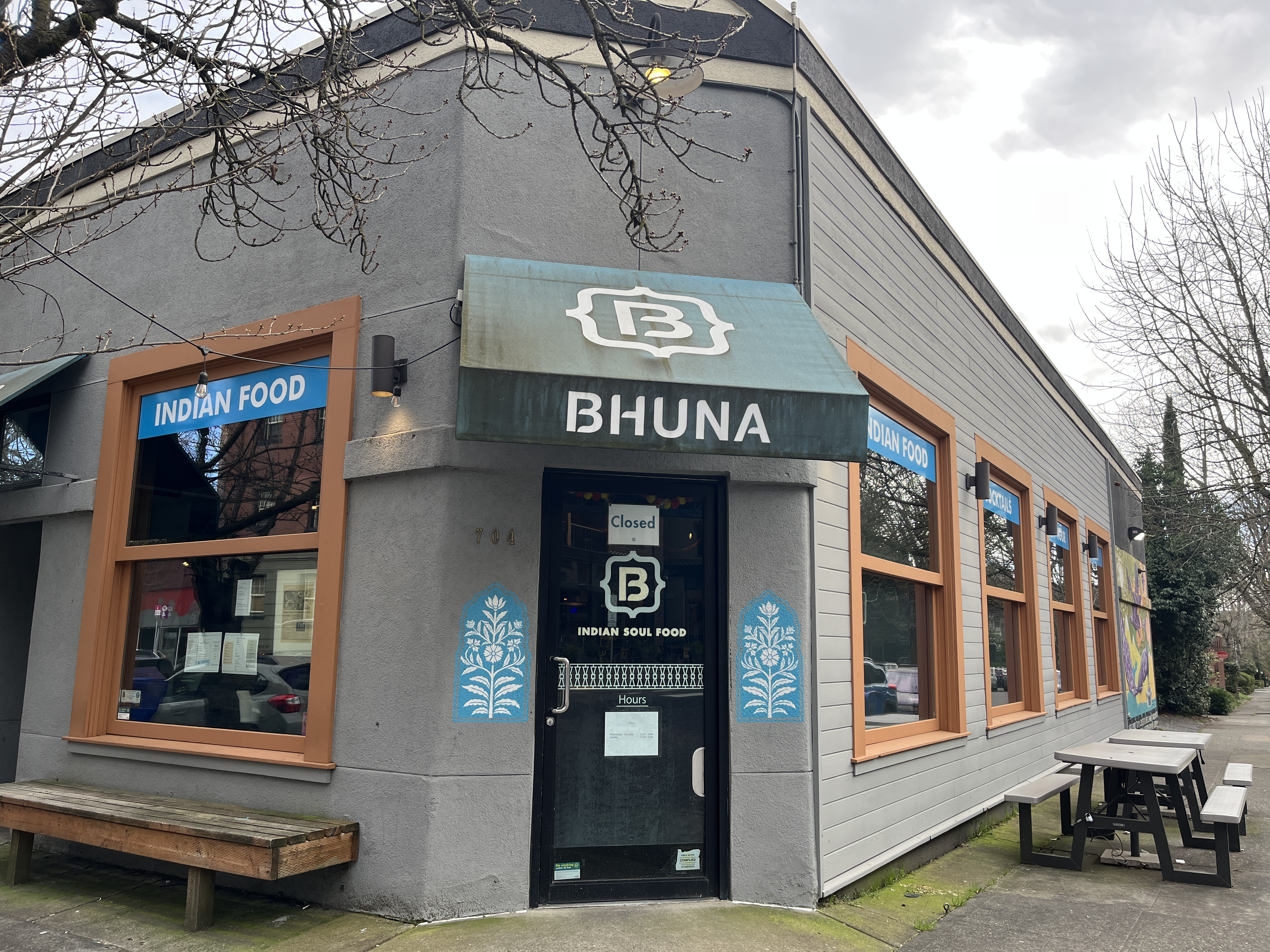
- The restaurant's exterior, 2026
- Interactive map of Bhuna

Restaurant information
- Food type: Kashmiri (Indian)
- Location: 704 Northwest 21st Avenue, Portland, Multnomah, Oregon, 97209, United States
- Coordinates: 45.5279°N 122.6942°W

Bhuna is an Indian restaurant in Portland, Oregon's Northwest District, in the United States. Established by chef Deepak Kaul in 2018, Bhuna has been described as the city's first Kashmiri restaurant.

== Description ==
The Indian restaurant Bhuna operates on 21st Avenue in northwest Portland's Northwest District. Eater Portland has described the business as a "blue-tinged, window-lined" and "sparsely decorated fast-casual spot". The interior has blue-green walls and white subway tiles.

Bhuna serves "Kashmiri soul food" such as rice bowls with kholrabi and collards with Kashmiri dried chilies, lamb rogan josh with black and green cardamom, and chickpea-fried calamari. Among cocktails are negronis, old fashioneds, palomas, and rum lassis.

== History ==
Chef Deepak Kaul started Bhuna as a pop-up restaurant at Culmination Brewing in 2018, before moving into a brick and mortar space on 21st Avenue on October 17; the space had previously housed Dick's Kitchen. Like many restaurants, Bhuna operated via take-out at times during the COVID-19 pandemic. In 2023, Bhuna celebrated its fifth anniversary by hosting a potluck party featuring dishes from other local chefs. For Diwali, the restaurant hosted a candle- and lamp-lit dinner after sundown. The dining room had a shrine to the Hindu gods Ganesha and Lakshmi, and the menu included gulab jamun, kheer, cardamom chocolate chip cookies, and mango kulfi.

== Reception ==
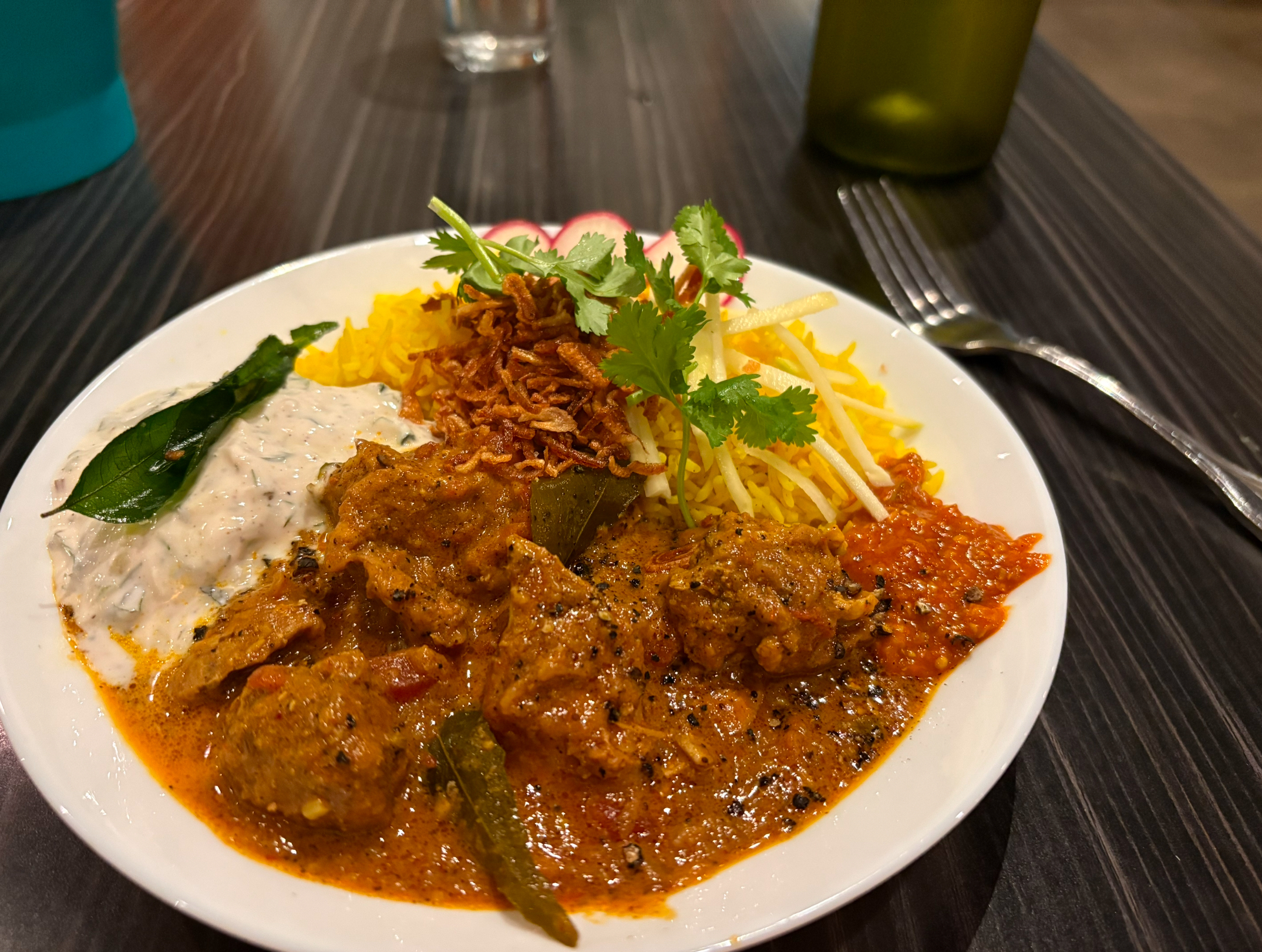
Chicken Chettinad with rice

Kaul won in the Chef of the Year category of Eater Portland's annual Eater Awards in 2018. Nick Woo included the Chettinad chicken in the website's 2019 list of thirteen "stellar" curries in the city, and Waz Wu recommended Bhuna in a 2021 overview of recommended restaurants for "standout" vegan curries. Eater Portland's Brooke Jackson-Glidden included the masoor dal in a 2022 list of sixteen "sick day delivery standbys to order" in the city, and Ron Scott included the business in a 2024 overview of "exceptional" Indian food in the Portland metropolitan area. Rebecca Roland included Bhuna in the website's 2025 overview of Portlnad's best Indian food.

In 2019, Willamette Week called Bhuna "a boon to the Portland area's small but vital group of worthwhile Indian restaurants", and Portland Monthly said the restaurant had "the ambiance of a Chase Bank lobby, but don't let that stop you from sampling its simple, spice-laden bowls". Krista Garcia included Bhuna in The Infatuation's 2024 list of the city's best restaurants.

== See also ==
- List of Indian restaurants
