= Thattu =

Indian restaurant in Chicago, Illinois, U.S.

- Interactive map of Thattu

Restaurant information
- Established: April 2023
- Owners: Margaret Pak and Vinod Kalathil
- Food type: Indian
- Location: 2601 West Fletcher Street, Chicago, Illinois, 60618, United States
- Coordinates: 41°56′18.3″N 87°41′35.2″W

Thattu is an Indian restaurant in the Avondale neighborhood of Chicago, Illinois. It is co-owned by Margaret Pak and Vinod Kalathil. The menu is inspired by Keralan cuisine.

== History ==
Pak and Kalathil launched the first iteration of Thattu at the Politan Row food hall in 2019. It was a semifinalist for the James Beard Foundation Award for Best New Restaurant in 2020. The food hall closed later that year.

In April 2023, Pak and Kalathil opened a permanent Thattu location in Avondale.

== Reception ==
In 2023, The New York Times included Thattu in its list of the 50 best restaurants in the United States. Eater also named it one of the 12 best new restaurants in the nation that year.

== See also ==
- List of Indian restaurants
