= Masalawala & Sons =

Restaurant in New York City

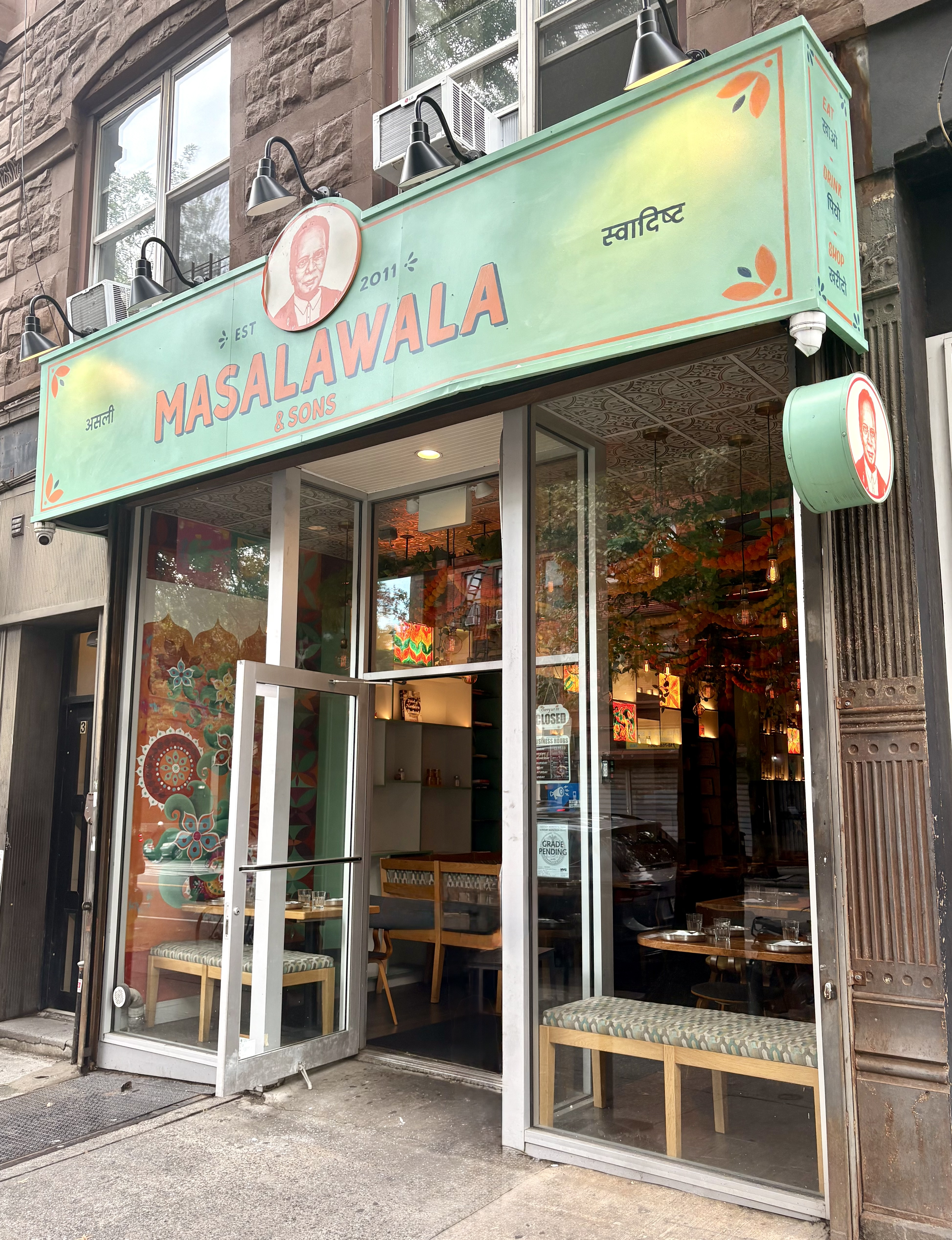
- Interactive map of Masalawala & Sons

Restaurant information
- Established: September 22, 2022
- Owners: Chintan Pandya and Roni Mazumda (Unapologetic Foods)
- Food type: Bengali; Indian
- Location: 365 Fifth Avenue, Brooklyn, New York, 11215, United States
- Coordinates: 40°40′17″N 73°59′03″W

Masalawala & Sons is an Indian restaurant in Park Slope, Brooklyn, New York City. It opened in September 2022 under partners Roni Mazumdar and Chintan Pandya of Unapologetic Foods, the hospitality group behind restaurants such as Dhamaka, the Michelin starred Semma, Rowdy Rooster, and Adda.

== Description ==
Masalawala & Sons focuses on Bengali and other East Indian dishes, with cooking methods that include cooking in clay vessels and the use of mustard oil. The restaurant also sells spices and condiments from small producers.

== History ==
The restaurant is a revival of Masalawala, which Roni Mazumdar opened with his father, Satyen, on the Lower East Side in 2011; that location closed in 2021. The Park Slope iteration opened on September 22, 2022, with Mazumdar and chef Chintan Pandya as partners through Unapologetic Foods. According to Roni Mazumdar, "[Masalawala & Sons] is the restaurant I wanted to open 10 years ago, but couldn’t." Satyen Mazumdar's portrait appears on the Masalawala & Sons awning.

== Reception ==
The New York Times reviewed the restaurant in January 2023 and later included it at number seven on the paper's annual list of the city's best new restaurants for 2023. Time Out New York rated Masalawala & Sons four out of five stars in December 2022.

== See also ==
- Bengali cuisine
- Indian cuisine
- List of Indian restaurants
