= Hindoostane Coffee House =

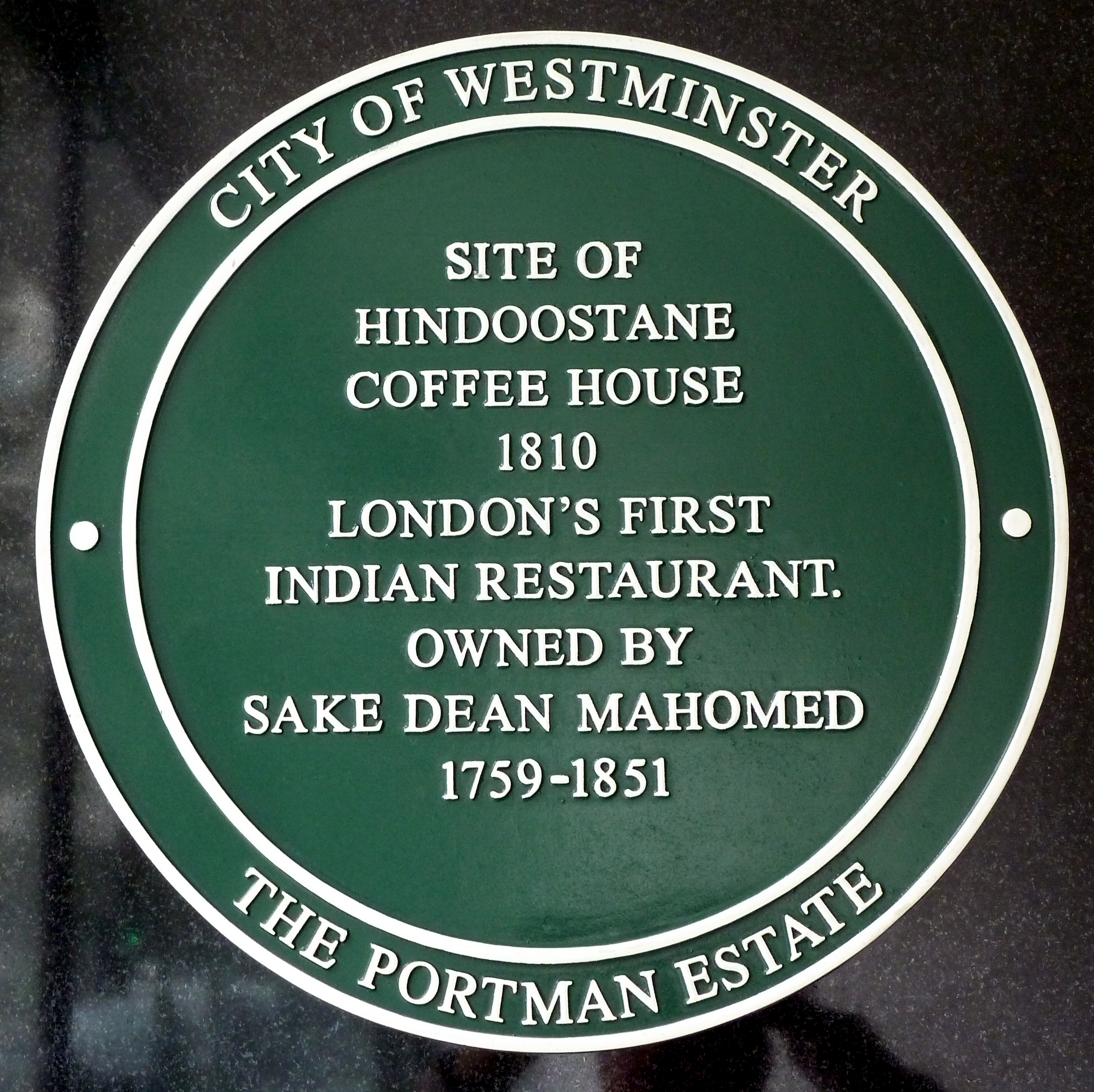
- Plaque commemorating the coffee house
- Interactive map of Hindoostane Coffee House

Restaurant information
- Established: 1810
- Closed: 1833
- Food type: Indian curry house
- Location: 34, George Street, London, England
- Coordinates: 51.5174°N 0.1565°W

The Hindoostane Coffee House, opened at 34 George Street, London in 1810 as the Hindoostane Dinner and Hooka Smoking Club, was an Indian restaurant, and the first of its kind in the British Isles. It was founded by Sake Dean Mahomed, a former captain in the British East India Company's Bengal Army. It closed in 1833, when Mahomed became bankrupt.

Its location is marked by a City of Westminster plaque, erected in September 2005.

== See also ==
- List of Indian restaurants
- Anglo-Indian cuisine
