= Vimala's Curryblossom Cafe =

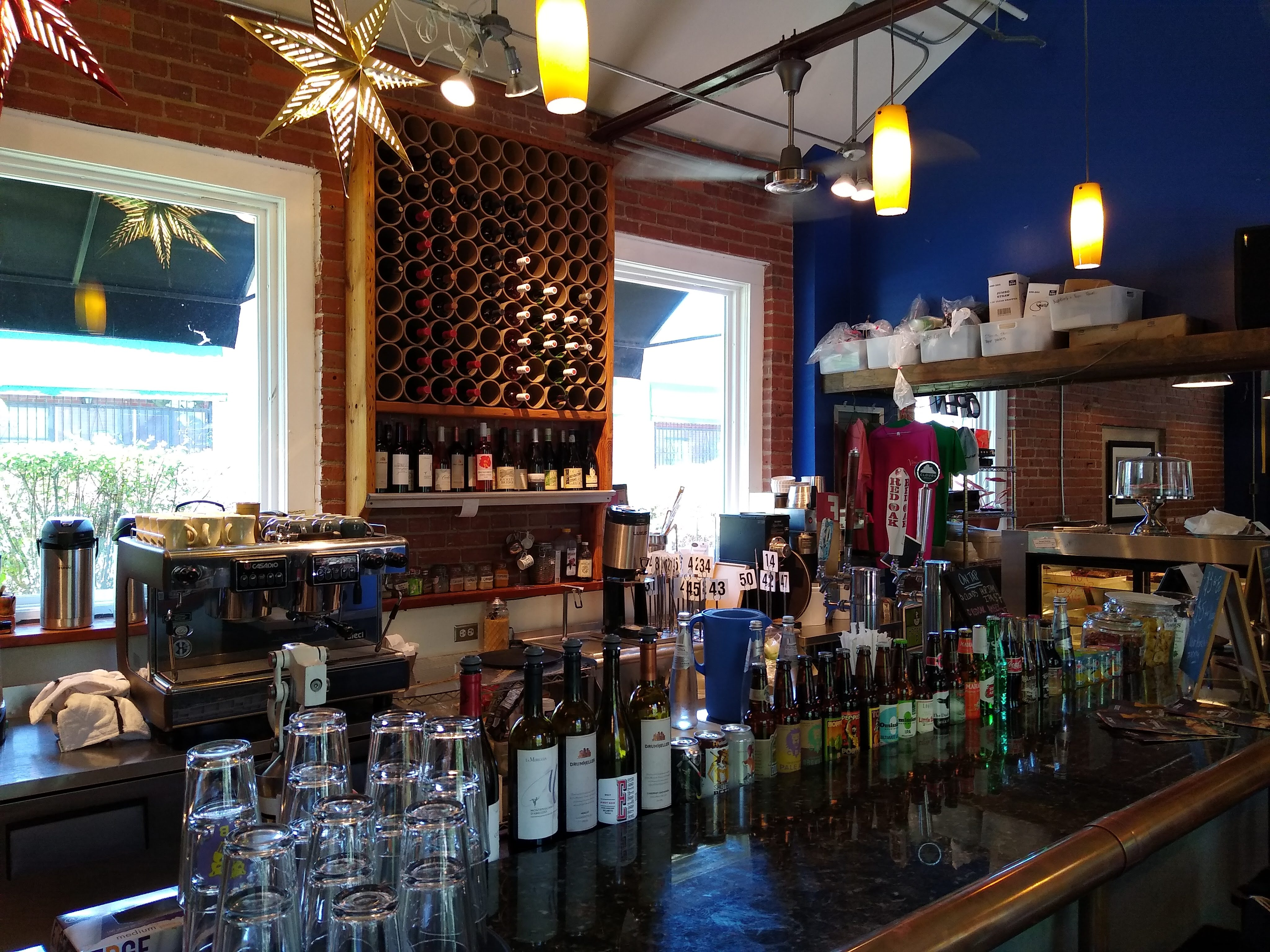

- Location within North Carolina Location within the United States

Restaurant information
- Established: May 31, 2010 (16 years ago)
- Owner: Vimala Rajendran
- Head chef: Vimala Rajendran
- Food type: Indian cuisine
- Location: 431 W Franklin St Suite 16; Chapel Hill, North Carolina, U.S.
- Coordinates: 35.9100322°N 79.0628443°W
- Other information: "When Vimala cooks, everybody eats"
- Website: curryblossom.com

Vimala's Curryblossom Cafe is an Indian restaurant on Franklin Street in Chapel Hill, North Carolina. Vimala Rajendran, an Indian immigrant to the United States, opened the restaurant in 2010. The restaurant purveys home-style Indian cuisine, and Southern food with local produce and pasture-raised meats. The company has provided free lunches in support of refugees at various events.

== History ==
Vimala Rajendran, born 1959, was born in Kerala and raised in Mumbai, attending college in Sion at age 17. She married at age 19 and moved to Ann Arbor, Michigan, to join her husband while pregnant with her first child. Rajendran returned to India in 1983 and returned to the US to Chapel Hill in 1985.

She began selling food in Chapel Hill in 1994 with weekly donation-based community dinners; two years prior, she had cooked a large dinner for neighbors and was motivated to continue. They also served a source of income for Rajendran's family. As a dependent spouse, she did not have legal authorization to work, and she served take-out dinners in an "underground" status from her house until 2010.

Vimala's Curryblossom Cafe opened on May 31, 2010, with $80,000 in community loans. Rajendran had learned about the practice of microcredit after a trip to Jamkhed. The restaurant made $650,000 in its first year.

Vimala's received the $100,000 Mission Main Street Grant from JPMorgan Chase in September 2015, one of 20 small businesses. At the time, Vimala's was $300,000 in debt, partially due to the high costs of paying living wage for the restaurant employees, sourcing quality local ingredients and general operating costs of a restaurant.

== Operations ==
The restaurant's fare consists of home-style Indian cuisine and North Carolinan cuisine. Rajendran's daughter Anjali was the restaurant's pastry chef, while son Rajeev and daughter Manju work for Vimala's as needed. Rajendran is the owner of the restaurant, located in The Courtyard at 431 West Franklin Street, Suite 415.

Vimala's has hosted events providing free lunch to refugees. Rajendran promotes Global Neighborhood Day on the Sunday after Thanksgiving to celebrate many cultures of the U.S. by hosting a free buffet dinner.

== Fare ==
Rajendran cooks many of her mother's recipes of the cuisine of Kerala, like sambar. It is also inspired by Maharashtrian cuisine, where Rajendran grew up, and Punjabi cuisine, especially samosas. The restaurant's menu also includes tandoori chicken, pulled pork, chole, dosas, collard greens, chai, and cardamom-chocolate brownies.

== Bibliography ==
- Jayaraman, Sarumathi (2016). Forked: A New Standard for American Dining. Oxford University Press. ISBN 9780199380473.
