= Chutney Mary =

Coordinates: 51.50571°N 0.13882°W

- Interactive map of Chutney Mary

Restaurant information
- Established: 1990
- Owner: MW Eat
- Food type: Indian (Northern, Goan, and Anglo-Indian)
- Rating: The MICHELIN Plate : good cooking (Michelin Guide 2018)
- Location: 73 St James's St, St. James's, London, SW1A 1PH, England
- Website: chutneymary.com

Chutney Mary is an Indian restaurant in London, founded in 1990 by Ranjit Mathrani & Namita Panjabi through their restaurant company, MW Eat. It was originally in King's Road, Chelsea, but moved to St James's, London in 2015.

Chutney Mary aims to showcase foods from 6 to 8 different regions of India at a time. Its philosophy is that regional foods are best cooked by the chefs from those regions.

== Awards and reviews ==
At its previous location, the restaurant twice received the Good Curry Guide's award for Best Indian restaurant in the UK. It was featured twice in Fay Maschler's top 20 London restaurants, and won the ITV Carlton Award as London's Best Indian Restaurant.

In its new location, the late A. A. Gill gave it 5 Stars in his The Sunday Times review, concluding "if there is a better pan-Indian restaurant in London than Chutney Mary, I haven't eaten in it".

Chutney Mary received the Square Meal Lifestyle BMW Best New Restaurant Award. The citation said "For a restaurant to reach the 25-year mark is unusual; for it to mark that anniversary by moving to a totally different part of the city is unheard of".

Time Out Magazine rated it as No. 5 of its Top 50 restaurants in London with the phrase "Indian cooking, as good as it gets." In the restaurant review, Roopa Gulati gave it a 5 Star rating, saying "Astonishing quality & wonderful service".

The Evening Standard - London Design Hotspot stated "The new home of Chutney Mary incorporates dazzling décor that is fitting for this sumptuous environment."

The Tatler recommended the Duck Jardaloo and Goan Chicken Curry.

Grace Dent in the Evening Standard called the dining room "irrefutably stunning", the restaurant "capacious, candle-bedazzled, art-strewn and Bentley-visited", and inevitably expensive. She found the venison samosas "unforgettable", and the carrot and cardamon soufflé with pistachio ice cream "the stuff of dreams".

Ben McCormack in The Daily Telegraph called the new restaurant "swanky". He explains that it was the first restaurant in Britain to cover all seven of the major cuisines of India: Lucknow, Punjab, Gujarat, Parsi, Goa, Mangalore, Kerala, and Hyderabad. He reported that the food was enjoyable and eye-opening.

== See also ==
- English cuisine
- List of Indian restaurants
