= Bombay Brasserie =

Coordinates: 51.4940°N 0.1827°W

- Interactive map of Bombay Brasserie

Restaurant information
- Established: 1982
- Food type: Indian
- Location: Gloucester Road Tube, Opposite, Courtfield Rd, London, SW7 4QH, United Kingdom
- Website: www.bombayb.co.uk

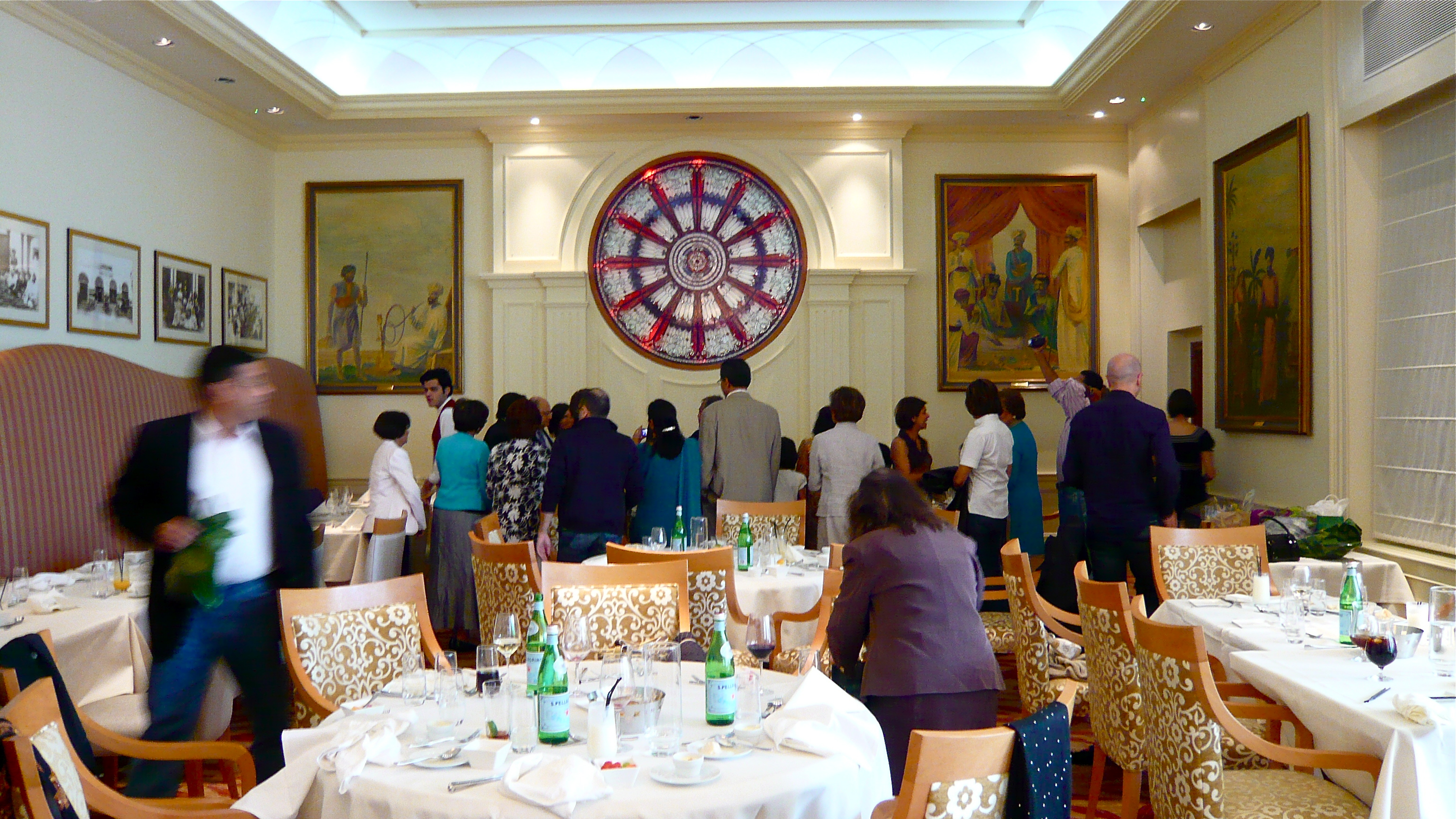
Bombay Brasserie interior

The Bombay Brasserie is an Indian restaurant in Kensington, London, opened in 1982. The name has also been used by a restaurant in Bradford.

It was listed in the Michelin Guide 2016 as being of "excellent standard". The London Economic stated the restaurant's mission as having always been to present "the authentic food of Bombay in all its ethnic variety", commenting that after refurbishment, it met and exceeded that goal. Cultural influences include Parsi, Goan, Bengali, and Gujarati. In 2016, Calibre Quarterly called it a "leading contender for London's finest Indian restaurant". Sloan Magazine described it as luxurious and iconic, with "authentic, eclectic Bombay and Indian cuisine."

== See also ==
- English cuisine
