= Meesha (restaurant) =

Indian restaurant in Seattle, Washington, U.S.

- Interactive map of Meesha

Restaurant information
- Food type: Indian
- Location: 127 N 36th Street, Seattle, King, Washington, 98103, United States
- Coordinates: 47°39′9.1″N 122°21′23.4″W
- Website: meeshaforyou.com

Meesha is an Indian restaurant in Seattle's Fremont neighborhood, in the U.S. state of Washington.

== Description ==
The menu has included Amritsari fish (rockfish with cardamom and fenugreek), bukhara dal, butter chicken, kofta, pakoras, paneer (with tomato sauce, asparagus, and pickled onions), and Goan prawn curry, as well as cocktails and wine.

== History ==
Meesha started as a pop-up restaurant, and began operating as a brick and mortar business in November 2020, during the COVID-19 pandemic. Kricket Club has been described as Meesha's "upscale sibling" restaurant.

== Reception ==
In 2021, Jessica Voelker and Stefan Milne included the business in Conde Nast Traveler's list of Seattle's 21 best restaurants. Additionally, Olivia Hall included Meesha in Time Out Seattle's overview of the city's 21 best restaurants. In 2022 the Seattle Metropolitan included the business in an overview of the city's 100 best restaurants. Eater Seattle included Meesha in a 2022 list of "The 38 Essential Restaurants in Seattle".

== See also ==
- List of Indian restaurants
