= Laughing Planet =

Restaurant chain based in Portland, Oregon, U.S.

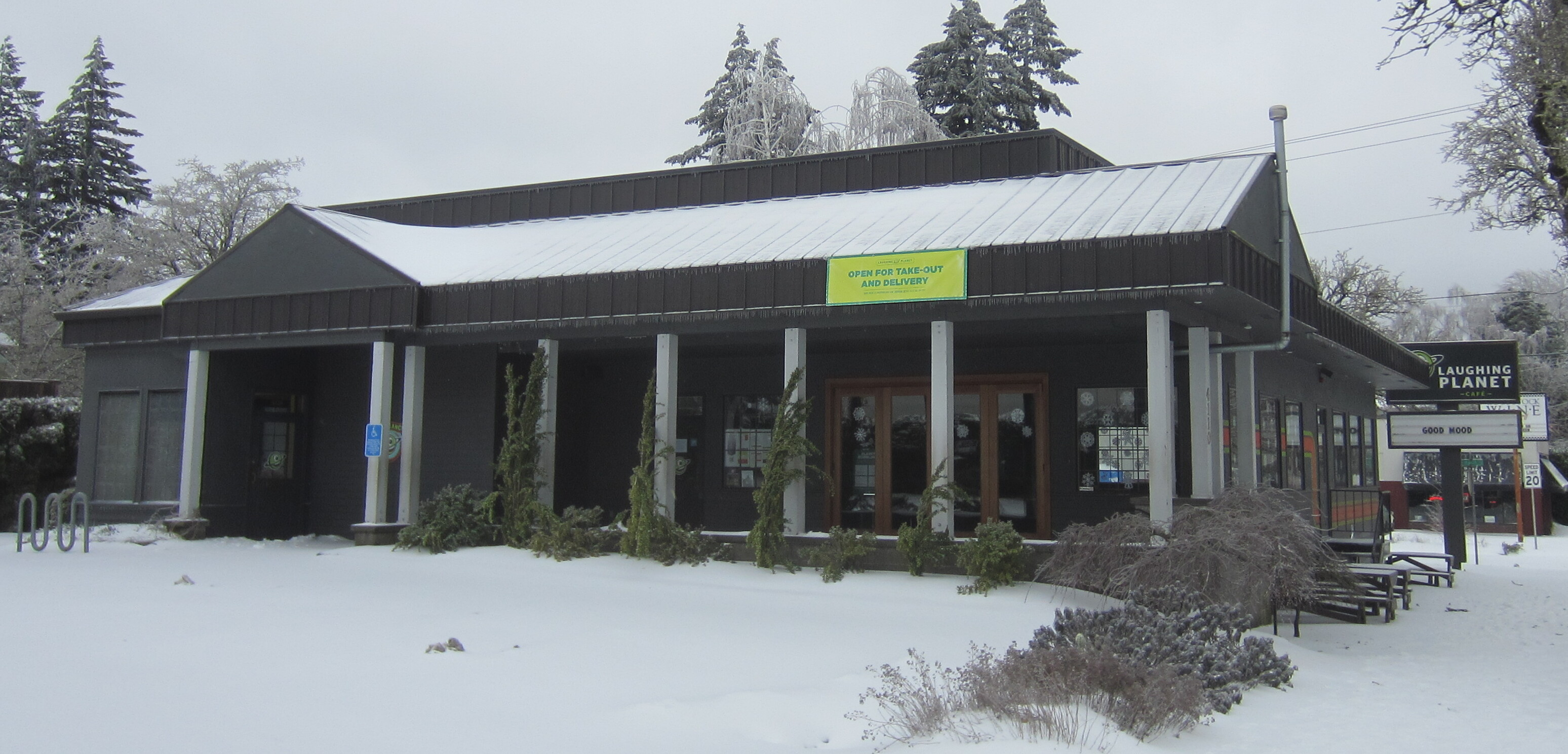
- A Laughing Planet location in Portland, Oregon
- Type: Private
- Industry: Food
- Founded: 1995; 31 years ago in Bloomington, Indiana
- Founder: Richard Satnick
- Headquarters: Portland, Oregon, U.S.
- Area served: Oregon; Washington; Nevada
- Key people: Franz Spielvogel (CEO)
- Website: laughingplanet.com

Laughing Planet is an American chain of fast casual restaurants specializing in burritos, bowls, soups, salads, and other "healthy food with a global influence." The chain was founded by Richard Satnick in Indiana in 1995 and moved operations to Portland, Oregon in 2000. As of 2025, the chain operates 14 locations in Oregon, Washington, and Nevada, with 7 of them in Portland.

In addition to standard fare, Laughing Planet is notable for their extensive vegetarian, vegan, and keto, paleo, and gluten-free options. They have received numerous awards including Willamette Week "Best of Portland" multiple times, and "Best Kid-Friendly Restaurant" in 2016.

== History ==
The chain was founded by Richard Satnick, who opened the first restaurant in Bloomington, Indiana, in 1995. Satnick relocated to Portland, Oregon in 2000. He moved operations and expanded the chain into Corvallis and Eugene.

Satnick sold the chain for an undisclosed amount in 2012; Laughing Planet had ten locations at the time. The company began offering employees up to 12 weeks of paid parental leave in 2015.

In August 2015, US Secretary of Labor Tom Perez visited Laughing Planet and spoke with employees.

Laughing Planet had ten locations in 10 restaurants in the Portland metropolitan area, two each in Eugene and Reno, Nevada, and one each in Bend and Corvallis, as of late 2018.

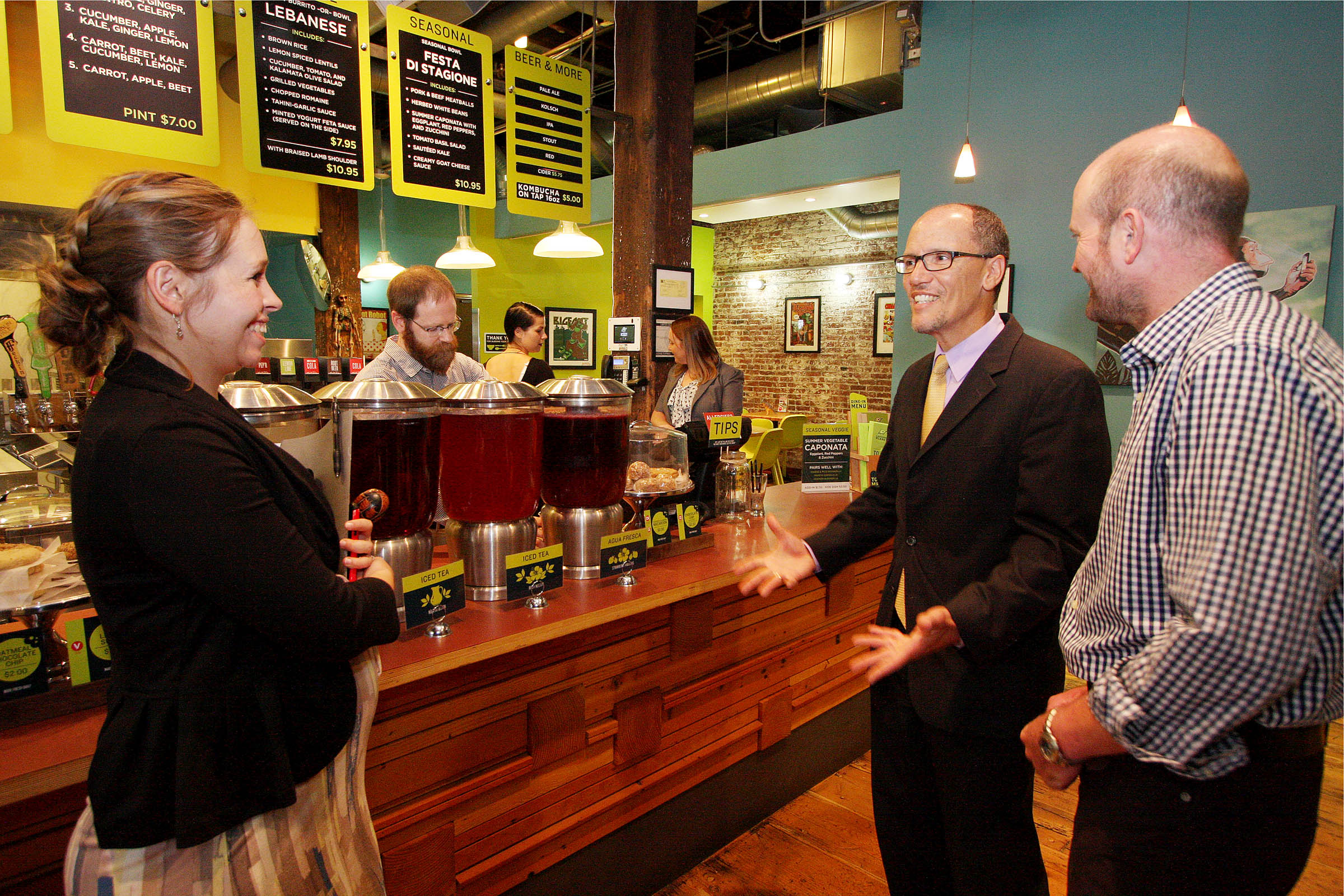
U.S. Labor Secretary Tom Perez visiting a Laughing Planet

As part of the COVID-19 pandemic, the company received between $1 million and $2 million in federally backed small business loan from Beneficial State Bank as part of the Paycheck Protection Program. The company stated it would allow them to retain 245 jobs.

== Reception ==
Laughing Planet ranked tenth in The Oregonian's 2017 readers' poll of Portland's best inexpensive restaurants.

The chain has been recognized by Willamette Week's "Best of Portland" readers' poll many times. The company was a runner-up in the "Best Kid-Friendly Restaurant" category in 2015. In 2016, Laughing Planet won in the "Best Kid-Friendly Restaurant" category, and placed third in the "Best Vegetarian Restaurant", "Best Paleo Options", and "Best Place to Eat Sustainably" categories. The chain won in the "Best Kid-Friendly Restaurant" category, and was runner-up in the "Best Vegetarian Restaurant" and "Best Place to Eat Sustainably" categories in 2017.

== See also ==
- List of restaurant chains in the United States
