= Kanyakumari (restaurant) =

Indian restaurant in New York City

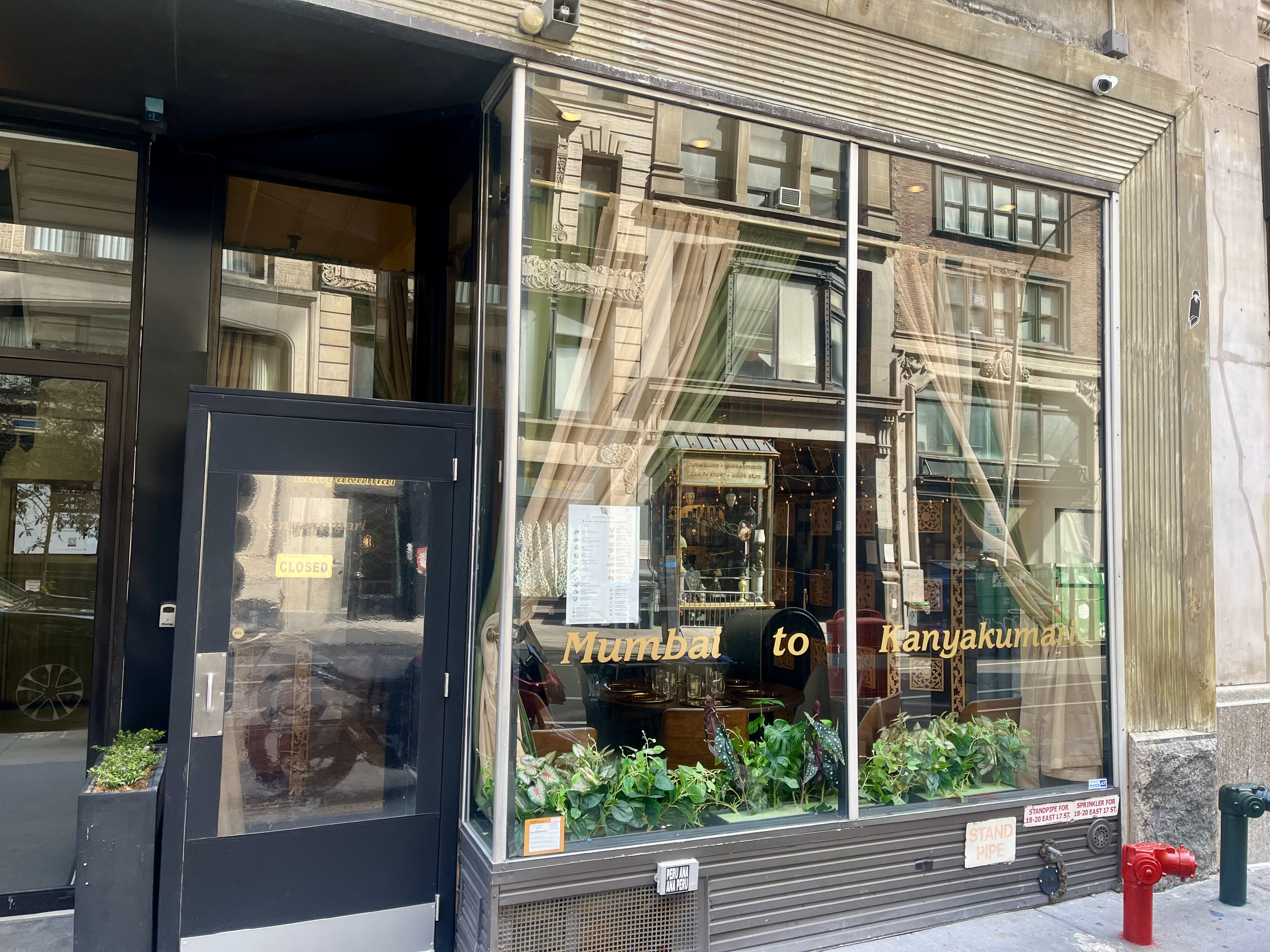
- The restaurant's exterior in 2024
- Interactive map of Kanyakumari

Restaurant information
- Established: January 2024
- Food type: Indian
- Location: 20 East 17th Street, New York City, New York, 10003, United States
- Coordinates: 40°44′15″N 73°59′28″W
- Website: kanyakumarinyc.com

Kanyakumari is an Indian restaurant in New York City off of Union Square in the Flatiron District primarily focusing on coastal Southern Indian food.

== History ==
Salil Mehta opened the restaurant in January 2024. Mehta previously operated the restaurant Kebaya in the same location. Other restaurants by the same group, Fungi Hospitality, include the once Michelin starred Laut (Malaysian), Kebab Au Sharab (Indian), Wau (Malaysian), and the Asian inspired cocktail bars Singlish and Jelas.

== Menu ==
The menu includes mussels Koliwada, slow-cooked Black Gold beef, and vada pav.

== Reviews and accolades ==
Kanyakumari joined the Michelin Guide for New York City in June 2024.

== See also ==
- List of Indian restaurants
