= Tamarind (restaurant) =

Coordinates: 51.50709°N 0.14718°W

Tamarind Restaurant
- Interactive map of Tamarind Restaurant

Restaurant information
- Established: 1995
- Food type: Indian and Anglo-Indian
- Rating: (Michelin Guide 2018)
- Location: 20 Queen Street, Mayfair, London, W1J 5PR, England
- Website: www.tamarindrestaurant.com

The Tamarind restaurant is an Indian restaurant in Mayfair, London, opened in 1995. It became one of the first Indian restaurants in London to receive a Michelin star, which it won in 2001 under head chef Atul Kochhar. Jonathan Gold, in the Los Angeles Times, wrote that he had been impressed by its "frank attempt to produce Indian food with the sheen and polish of white-tablecloth European cuisine", though he chiefly recalled "the wine list, the flowers, and the cost."

The Michelin Guide described the food and menu as "extensive à la carte of generous dishes perfect for sharing, with a selection of small plates like Rajasthani churi chaat to start, and a good selection of curries and biryanis for the main course." In 2023, Tamarind was featured in an article published by Tatler on "The most outstanding Indian restaurants in London".

== See also ==
- Indian cuisine
- Anglo-Indian cuisine
