= British cuisine =

Culinary traditions of the United Kingdom

British cuisine consists of the cooking traditions and practices associated with the United Kingdom, including the regional cuisines of England, Scotland, Wales, and Northern Ireland. British cuisine has its roots in the cooking traditions of the indigenous Celts; however, its diverse culinary offerings have been significantly influenced and shaped by subsequent waves of settlement and conquest, notably those of the Romans, Anglo-Saxons, Vikings, and the Normans; waves of migration, notably immigrants from India, Bangladesh, Pakistan, Jamaica and the wider Caribbean, China, Italy, South Africa, and Eastern Europe, primarily Poland; and exposure to increasingly globalised trade and connections to the Anglosphere, particularly the United States, Canada, Australia, and New Zealand.

Highlights and staples of British cuisine include the roast dinner, the full breakfast, shepherd's pie, toad in the hole, fried chicken and fish and chips; and a variety of both savoury and sweet pies, cakes, tarts, and pastries. Foods influenced by immigrant populations and the British appreciation for spice have led to the invention of new curries. Other traditional desserts include trifle, scones, apple pie, sticky toffee pudding, and Victoria sponge cake. British cuisine also includes a large variety of cheeses, beers, and ciders.

Around the United Kingdom vibrant culinary scenes exist influenced by global cuisine. The modern phenomenon of television celebrity chefs began in the United Kingdom with Philip Harben. Since then, well-known British chefs have wielded considerable influence on modern British and global cuisine, including Marco Pierre White, Gordon Ramsay, Jamie Oliver, Heston Blumenthal, Rick Stein, Nigella Lawson, Hugh Fearnley-Whittingstall, and Fanny Cradock.

== History ==
=== Celtic origins and Roman conquest ===
British cuisine has its roots in the cooking practices of the indigenous Celts. Celtic agriculture and animal breeding practices produced a wide variety of foodstuffs, such as grain, fruit, vegetables, and cattle. Archaeological evidence of cheese production can be seen as early as 3,800 BC, while bread from cereal grains was being produced as early as 3,700 BC. Ancient Celts fermented apples to produce cider, as recorded by Julius Caesar during his attempted invasions of Britain in 55-54 BC.

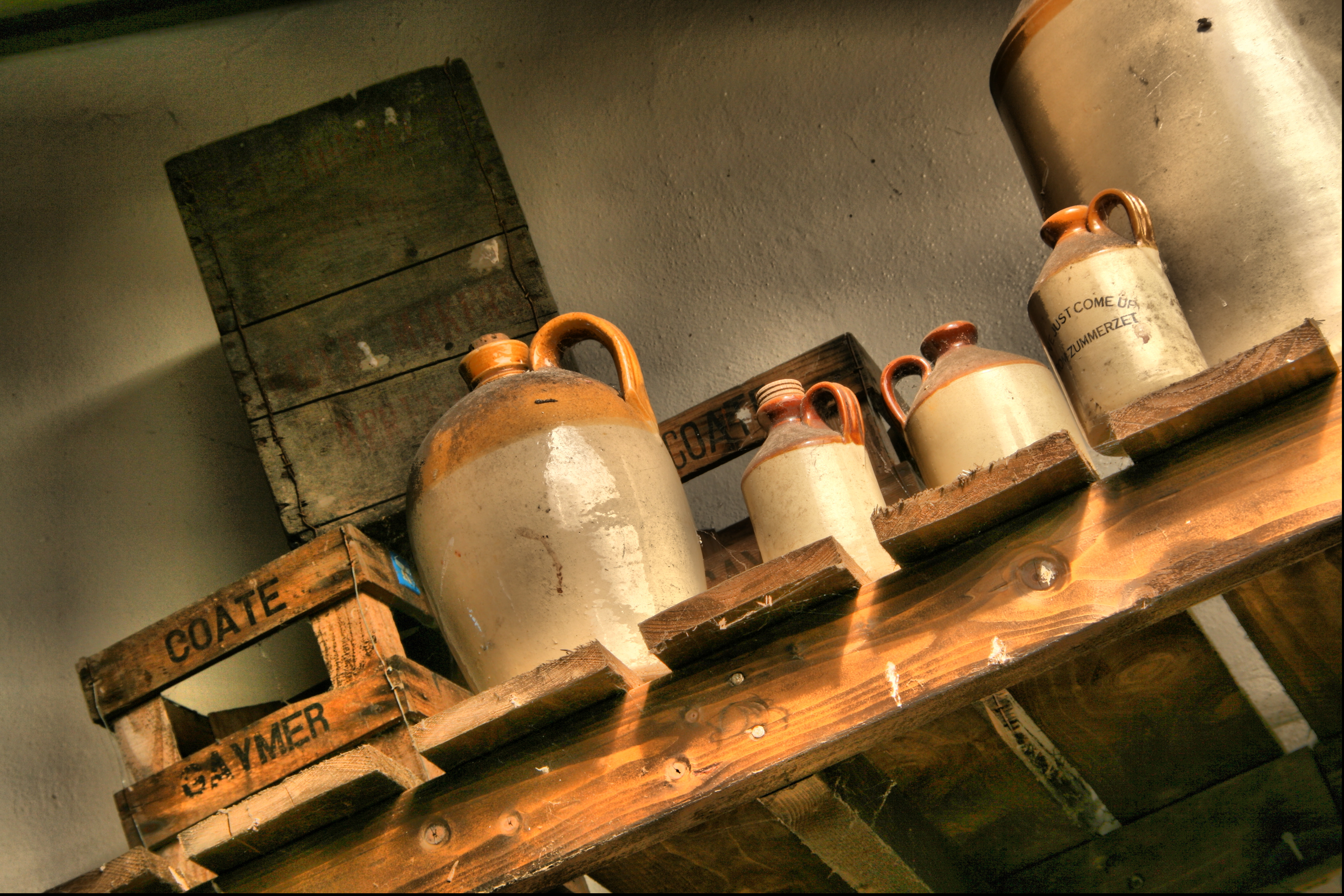
Cider jugs in Somerset, England. The UK is the world's largest cider consumer, accounting for a third of global sales

Strabo records that Celtic Britons cultivated millet, herbs, and root vegetables, and practised apiculture to produce honey. Trade with Celtic Gauls in what is now modern-day France and the Low Countries, as well as with the Roman Republic following its conquest of Gaul, introduced grains such as wheat, oats, and rye. Barley was grown to produce porridge and malt for beer, while flax was grown for its oil. Broad beans, wild spinach, herbs, and primitive parsnips were the primary sources of vegetables and greens in Celtic Britain.

According to Julius Caesar, Celtic Britons domesticated cattle, which were symbols of status and wealth, sheep and goats for their meat and milk; and, to a lesser extent, pigs for ham. Caesar notes that Celts also domesticated geese, chickens, and hares, but it is unclear whether they were kept for food or for religious rituals due to the association with Celtic deities. Trade with Romans also led to the import of wine.

In 43 AD, the Roman Empire invaded and began its conquest of Britain, eventually encompassing all of modern-day England, Wales, and parts of southern Scotland. The Roman conquest brought a culinary renaissance to the island, importing many foodstuffs which were hitherto unknown to Celtic Britons, including fruits such as figs, medlars, grapes, pears, cherries, plums, damsons, mulberries, dates, olives, vegetable marrows, and cucumbers; vegetables such as carrots, celery, asparagus, endives, turnips, cabbages, leeks, radishes, onions, shallots, and artichokes; nuts, seeds, and pulses such as sweet chestnuts, lentils, peas, pine nuts, almonds, walnuts, and sesame; and herbs and spices such as garlic, basil, parsley, borage, chervil, thyme, common sage, sweet marjoram, summer savory, black pepper, ginger, cinnamon, rosemary, mint, coriander, chives, dill, and fennel. Produced foods such as sausages were also imported, along with new animals, including rabbits, pheasants, peacocks, guinea fowl, and possibly fallow deer.

Roman colonists were able to grow wine in vineyards as far north as Northamptonshire and Lincolnshire, and the longevity of Roman occupation is credited as creating the wine industry in Britain. The importance of seafood to the Roman diet led to its increasing popularity in Britain, particularly shellfish such as oysters. The quality of oysters from Colchester in particular became prized in Rome as a delicacy. After the end of Roman rule in Britain and the subsequent collapse of the Western Roman Empire, the use of more exotic food items lessened. After the Roman period, British cuisine predominately consisted of vegetables, cereals, and meats such as mutton.

=== The Middle Ages ===
Shortly after the end of Roman rule in Britain, the Germanic Anglo-Saxons began conquering and colonising the island. The Anglo-Saxons introduced bacon to Britain during this period; rural families had their own recipes for curing and smoking bacon, while urban residents would purchase bacon from butchers who developed their own curing methods. Residents in London had access to a particularly diverse range of bacon products from across Britain. Anglo-Saxons helped to entrench stews, broths, and soups into British cuisine, along with an early form of the crumpet. Bread and butter became common fare, and the English in particular gained a reputation for their liberal use of melted butter as a sauce with meat and vegetables. Ale was a popular drink of choice among the nobility and peasantry alike, and mead production increased around Christian monasteries. Danish and other Scandinavian invaders during the Viking Age introduced techniques for smoking and drying fish.

After the Norman Conquest in 1066, the Normans reintroduced many spices and continental influences that had been lost after the departure of the Romans. Many of the modern English words for foodstuffs, such as beef, pork, mutton, gravy, jelly, mustard, onion, herb, and spice are derived from Old French words introduced by the Normans. Though eating habits and cooking methods remained largely unchanged, pig farming intensified under the Norman dynasty. The Crusades and trade with Arab Muslim empires introduced foods such as oranges and sugarcane to Britain.

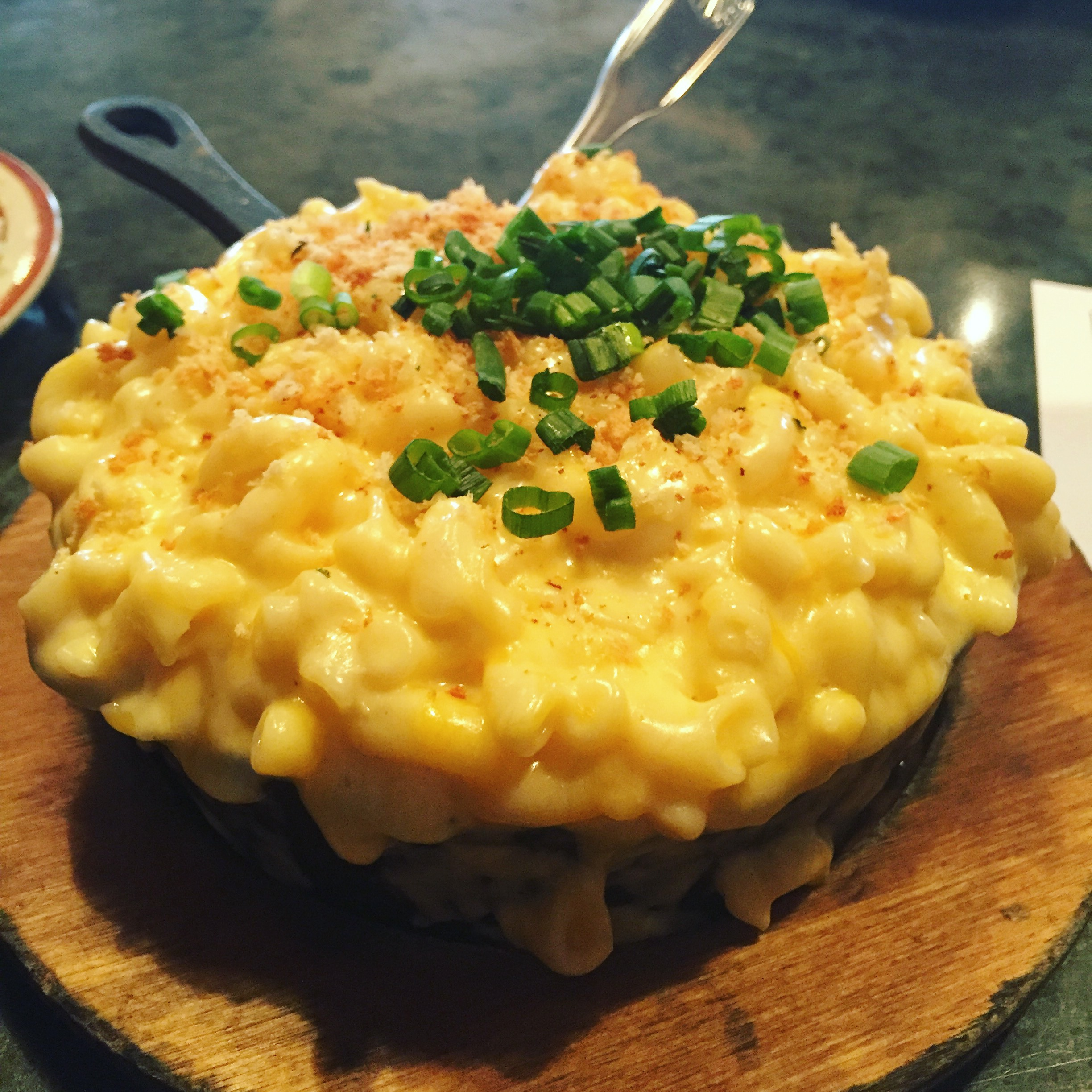
A pan of macaroni cheese

It was during the late 14th century that the first cookery books began to emerge, notably the English book the Forme of Cury, (Note: Cury here means cooking, related to French cuire, to cook.) containing recipes from the court of Richard II. The recipes it describes are diverse and sophisticated, with a wide variety of ingredients such as capon, pheasant, almonds, cinnamon, ginger, cloves, dates, pine nuts, saffron, mace, nutmeg and sugar. It also describes foods such as gingerbread, and sweet and sour sauces. Elaborate stews such as dillegrout became commonly served at the coronations of English monarchs. It was during the Middle Ages that many staples of British cuisine began to develop, such as the apple pie, an early cheesecake (called sambocade), custard, mince pies, pasties, and various forms of meat pies. The dish macaroni cheese originated at this time in England, where it took the form of a baked pasta and cheese casserole.

=== Tudor and Stuart era ===
The dawn of the Tudor dynasty following the Wars of the Roses coincided with the European discovery of the New World, the initiation of the Columbian exchange, and globalisation of trade, which opened up Britain to a range of new foodstuffs not seen since the Roman conquest. Foods from the New World included grains such as maize; fruits such as avocados, chili peppers chocolate, cranberries, guavas, papayas, pineapples, squashes, and tomatoes; vegetables such as potatoes, cassavas, and sweet potatoes; legumes such as peanuts and haricot beans, spices such as vanilla; and animals, most notably turkeys. The growth of the global spice trade, now dominated by rapidly expanding European empires, led to the re-proliferation of black pepper, nutmeg, cloves, mace, and cinnamon in British cookery.

The late 15th century saw the development of a well-known alcoholic beverage, Scotch whisky. It was during the early 16th century that cookery books printed using the printing press became more widely available, notably The Boke of Cokery printed at the turn of the century in 1500 by Richard Pynson, and The Good Huswifes Jewell towards the end of the century in 1585 by Thomas Dawson. Under the Tudor dynasty in England and Wales, and the Stuart dynasty in Scotland, British cuisine became more refined and grew more sophisticated. Recipes began to emphasise a balance of sweet and sour flavours, butter became a key ingredient in sauces, reflecting a trend seen in France that continued in subsequent centuries, and herbs such as thyme, used only sparingly in the medieval period, began to replace spices as flavourings.

Throughout the Tudor period, fruits such as apples, gooseberries, grapes, oranges, and plums were commonly eaten. The main source of carbohydrates in British diets remained bread, and its composition reflected one's socio-economic class: the peasantry ate bread made from rye or coarse wheat, the emerging middle class of prosperous tenants ate a yeoman's bread made of wholemeal, while the most expensive bread was made of white wheat flour. Meat consumption grew rapidly throughout the 16th century as the price of meat fell, and poorer families who would have rarely enjoyed meat a century before now had wider access to it. Commoners living by rivers or along the coast ate seafood that was plentiful to the waters surrounding Britain, such as haddock, sole, cod, oysters, whitebait, and cockles, while the wealthier classes ate sturgeon, seals, crab, lobster, salmon, trout, and shrimp. Commoners ate whatever meat they could hunt, such as rabbit, blackbirds, chicken, ducks, and pigeons.

The nobility consumed fresh meat in such vast quantities that it constituted approximately 75% of their diet. For example, the quantities of meat procured for the court of Elizabeth I in just one year included 8,200 sheep, 2,330 deer, 1,870 pigs, 1,240 oxen, 760 calves, and 53 wild boar. Pies became an important staple as both food and for court theatrics; the nursery rhyme "Sing a Song of Sixpence", with its lyrics "Four and Twenty blackbirds / Baked in a pie. // When the pie is opened, the birds began to sing", refers to the conceit of placing live birds under a pie crust just before serving at a banquet. Nobles ate costlier or more unusual varieties of meat, such as swans, lamb and mutton, veal, beef, heron, pheasant, partridge, quail, peafowl, geese, boar, and venison. Royal banquets during the court of Henry VIII included unusual meats such as conger eel and porpoise.

Desserts and sweet foods grew rapidly as European demand for sugar ballooned during the 16th century. Sweets in British cuisine at this time included pastry-based foods such as tarts, sweet flans, and custards. The 16th century saw the emergence of sweet foods such as the fruit fool, most commonly made with gooseberries, sugar, and clotted cream; syllabubs, a dessert made with milk or cream, sugar, and wine, and trifle, at the time a thick cream flavoured with sugar, ginger, and rosewater. Trifle has remained a staple of British cuisine and is a popular sweet dish today. Scones and shortbread developed in Scotland at this time; though shortbread had been known since the 12th century, it was refined into its modern form during the reign of Mary, Queen of Scots. As trade with Southeast Asia increased, widespread eating of rice became more common, though it was usually in the form of a dessert, giving rise to rice pudding in Britain. Owing to the growing appreciation of sweet foods in Britain, the sponge cake, which would later become a defining food of the Victorian era and afternoon tea, had its start in the early 17th century, which mixed flour, sugar, and eggs, seasoned with anise and coriander seeds.

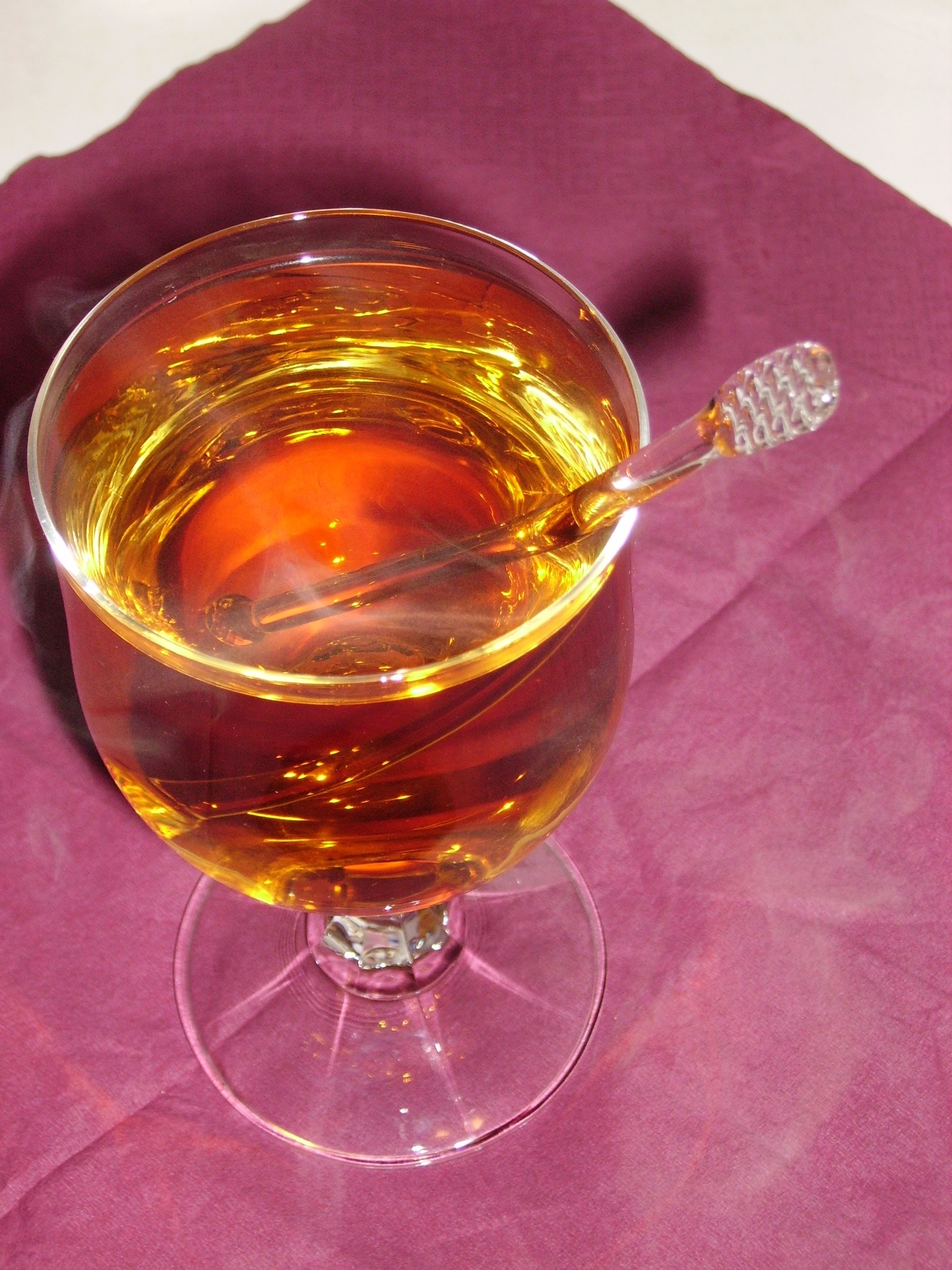
Rum grog, a staple drink of the Royal Navy

During the Stuart dynasty into the 17th century, trade with Africa, India, and China increased, largely through private interests, namely the East India Company. Fruits such as bananas became more commonplace, however it was the introduction of tea that would have a much more profound effect on British culinary habits. Tea remained quite expensive until the 18th century, and it was only consumed by wealthier middle class individuals and those in the nobility before that time. Coffee, a drink derived from the beans of a plant native to Yemen, was introduced to Europe through Italy, and became highly successful in the mid-to-late 17th century. Coffee houses sprang up across Britain; one, Oxford's Queen's Lane Coffee House, established in 1654, is still open today as the oldest continually-serving coffee house in Europe.

The alcoholic beverage rum, produced from molasses throughout the Caribbean and North America, came to be associated with the British Royal Navy at this time, when they captured the valuable sugar-producing island of Jamaica in 1655. In particular, grog, a mixture of rum diluted with water, became a staple drink in the Royal Navy as well as the British Army. The tradition of issuing a rum ration to sailors continued until 31 July 1970.

=== Georgian era ===
In 1707, the kingdoms of England (which included Wales) and Scotland united to form a new country, the Kingdom of Great Britain. For the vast majority of the 18th century, the new British nation was ruled by the House of Hanover under the Georgian dynasty. During this time, the British deepened their influence in India, displacing the Dutch and French as the preeminent European power in southeast Asia. Increasing British domination of global trade, cheapening of ingredients hitherto affordable only to wealthier individuals, and a burgeoning middle class led to many innovations in British cuisine, influenced by foods the British encountered in India.

The 18th century saw a revolution in English cookery books, notably The Compleat Housewife in 1727 by Eliza Smith and The Art of Cookery Made Plain and Easy twenty years later by writer Hannah Glasse, which became a best seller for a century. Glasse's book not only heavily influenced British cuisine, but also early American cuisine, with copies owned by Benjamin Franklin, Thomas Jefferson, and George Washington. The book contains the earliest written recipe for fried chicken as well as the first known recipe in English for curry, which called for chicken to be fried in butter, ground turmeric, ginger, and pepper, then stewed with cream and lemon juice added before serving, resembling the modern dish butter chicken. Dishes that would become staples of British cuisine well into the 21st century were first mentioned in Glasse's book, such as Yorkshire pudding, burgers (called "Hamburgh sausage"), the addition of jelly into trifle, and piccalilli. Elizabeth Raffald's cookbook, The Experienced English Housekeeper published in 1769, contains an early recipe for macaroni and cheese, an English dish with origins in baked cheese and pasta casseroles in medieval England, the earliest known recipe for a wedding cake, complete with marzipan and royal icing, and one of the earliest mentions of barbecue in British cuisine.

Pies and other hearty snack-type foods continued to develop in variety and popularity, favoured by hunters as an easy, portable lunch. Glasse describes a "Cheshire pork pie", a pie filled with layers of pork loin and apples, sweetened with sugar and filled with white wine. The sandwich, now a global staple with countless varieties though originally referring to roast beef between two slices of toasted bread, and named for John Montagu, 4th Earl of Sandwich, gained widespread popularity in the 18th century. Montagu reputedly ordered the food during late-night sessions in gambling houses, as it could be eaten without the need for cutlery, allowing him to continue his gambling uninterrupted. With the Industrial Revolution rapidly developing during the 18th century in Britain and the growth of a new, industrial urban-based working class, the demand for fast, portable, and inexpensive meals grew considerably, leading to the ubiquitous adoption of the sandwich. Similar foods previously reserved for the upper class also started gaining popularity with the working class in other parts of the country, such as the Cornish pasty, favoured by miners in Cornish tin mines, working to fuel Britain's growing industry. Tavern-style foods which became culinary classics developed during this time, notably Welsh rarebit, consisting of toasted bread topped with a sauce made of cheese, ale, and mustard.

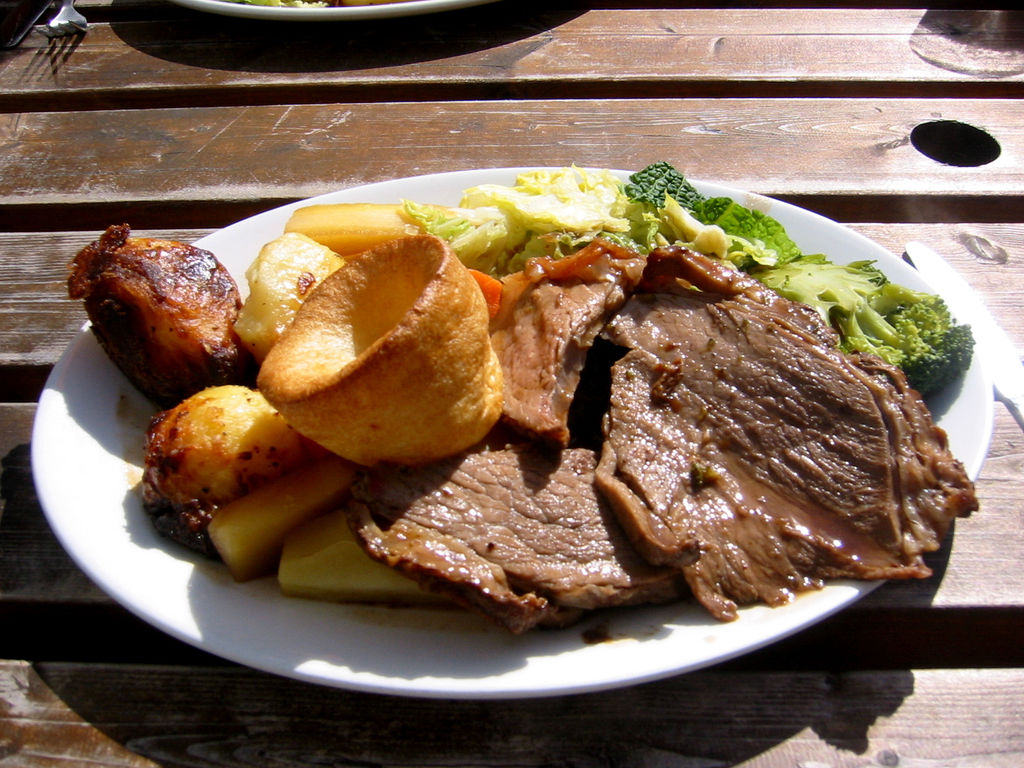
A Sunday roast of roast beef, roast potatoes, vegetables and Yorkshire pudding

Roast beef became an entrenched staple of British culinary identity in the 18th century, so much so that a French nickname for the British (more specifically the English) is "les Rosbifs" (the roast beefs). It was during the late 18th century that roast beef gained its association with the Sunday roast dinner, a cornerstone of British cuisine. Families would place a cut of meat into the oven with root vegetables such as potatoes, turnips, and parsnips before attending the Sunday church service. Upon their return, the meal would be cooked, and the juices from the roast was then used to make a gravy to pour on top of the dinner. Though roast beef is most strongly associated with the traditional Sunday roast dinner, other meats are more commonly used today, such as chicken, lamb, pork, and sometimes duck, goose, gammon, turkey, or other game birds. With the Industrial Revolution increasingly mechanising food production and advancing food science, the world's first commercial bacon processing plant was opened in Wiltshire by John Harris in the 1770s. Today, Wiltshire cured bacon is prized in Britain for its quality. Amateur plant breeder Thomas Edward Knight of Downton, near Salisbury, England, developed the world's first sweet-tasting pea.

Poorer households attempting to extend the longevity of their meat stores made them into savoury batter puddings, giving rise to the classic dish Toad in the hole. Originally the dish used beef and pigeon, however it is most commonly associated today with sausages, served with vegetables and onion gravy. Scouse, essentially a beef and root vegetable stew, developed along similar lines of thrift. The name, derived from lobscouse, is the origin of the term "Scouser", a nickname for people from Liverpool, due to the association of the dish with that city, particularly sailors. Sailors engaged in trade in Asia returned with knowledge of savoury sauces used as condiments. Eliza Smith subsequently published the first recipe for ketchup, a mushroom variety which used anchovies and horseradish. British ketchup consequently used mushrooms rather than tomatoes as the primary ingredient, and was prepared extensively by British colonists in the Thirteen Colonies. Chutney, a type of preserved relish developed in India, gained huge popularity in Britain, particularly with the working class who desired ever more exotic flavours in their diet.

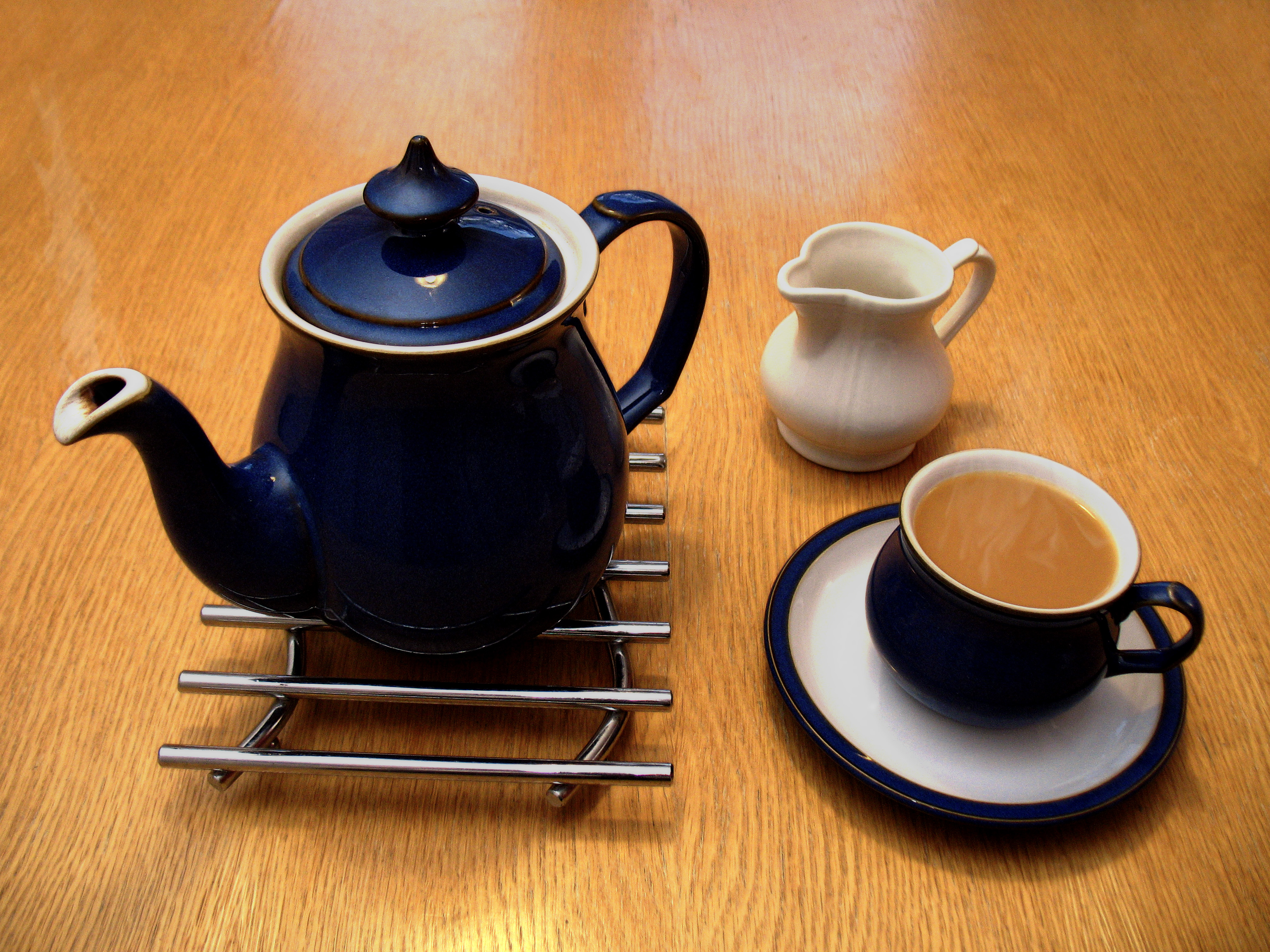
A tea set consisting of a ceramic teapot, a milk jug, and a full teacup on a saucer. Tea is a quintessential British staple.

The British penchant for sweet foods continued throughout the Georgian era. The staple of bread and butter pudding, a baked custard-based dish made with bread, butter, currants, cream, eggs, and nutmeg, was first described in 1728 by Eliza Smith. Adapting earlier recipes of Portuguese quince paste, the Scots invented the modern form of marmalade; an easily spreadable fruit preserve made from bitter orange. Eccles cakes, a small flaky pastry filled with currants, emerged in the late 18th century, which still retains some popularity today particularly in Manchester and Lancashire. Suet pudding, a boiled, steamed, or baked pudding of wheat flour, suet, dried fruits, and spices developed during this time, and become popular fare.

The British conquest of India led to the acquisition of the large Indian tea industry, resulting in tea becoming cheaper to import than coffee. The ease of tea production compared to coffee led to tea becoming a British staple, spreading through all classes, becoming a prominent feature of modern British culture and identity. Gin, an alcoholic beverage introduced into Britain in the latter half of the 17th century, exploded in popularity throughout the first half of the 18th century, and became extremely popular with the lower classes. Its popularity and heavy consumption was such that the British Parliament passed five major Acts to control the consumption of the drink.

=== Victorian era ===
Victoria ascended the throne in 1837 and ruled until 1901. The longevity of her reign helped entrench many culinary traditions and trends. For example, she developed a love of Indian chutneys and curry, and ordered curry twice a week on average. The trend became popular among the aristocracy and subsequently spread throughout society.

Emerging social changes also influenced the growth and development of British cuisine. Writers such as American-born Elizabeth Robins Pennell helped to re-cast cooking not as a duty, but as a valuable creative pursuit by framing cooking as a "high art practised by geniuses", encouraging upper and middle class Victorian women to express their own culinary creativity for the first time. This tied into the growth of the middle class in Victorian Britain as wealth poured in from all over the Empire, and industrialisation spread into food production which cheapened ingredients, allowing more people to purchase goods previously reserved only for the very wealthy. Middle-class women, in lieu of being able to afford servants and private cooks, began to make more elaborate dishes to impress guests at dinner parties.

Britain's rapid industrialisation and urbanisation in the 19th century impacted people of all socio-economic classes. Wealthy aristocrats began to have their evening meal later in the day, but still took lunch at midday. Consequently, shortly after Victoria's ascension to the throne, one of her ladies-in-waiting, Anna Maria Russell, began to ask for tea, bread, and cake to be delivered to her room. The habit soon spread among the aristocracy, birthing a new tradition of afternoon tea. Industrialisation helped reduce costs of ingredients thanks to mass-production, and pared-down versions of lavish meals characteristic of the upper class began to reach the middle and working class, such as the cooked full breakfast, usually composed of fried sausage or bacon, cooked eggs, assorted sides and toast, which grew in popularity during the Victorian era.

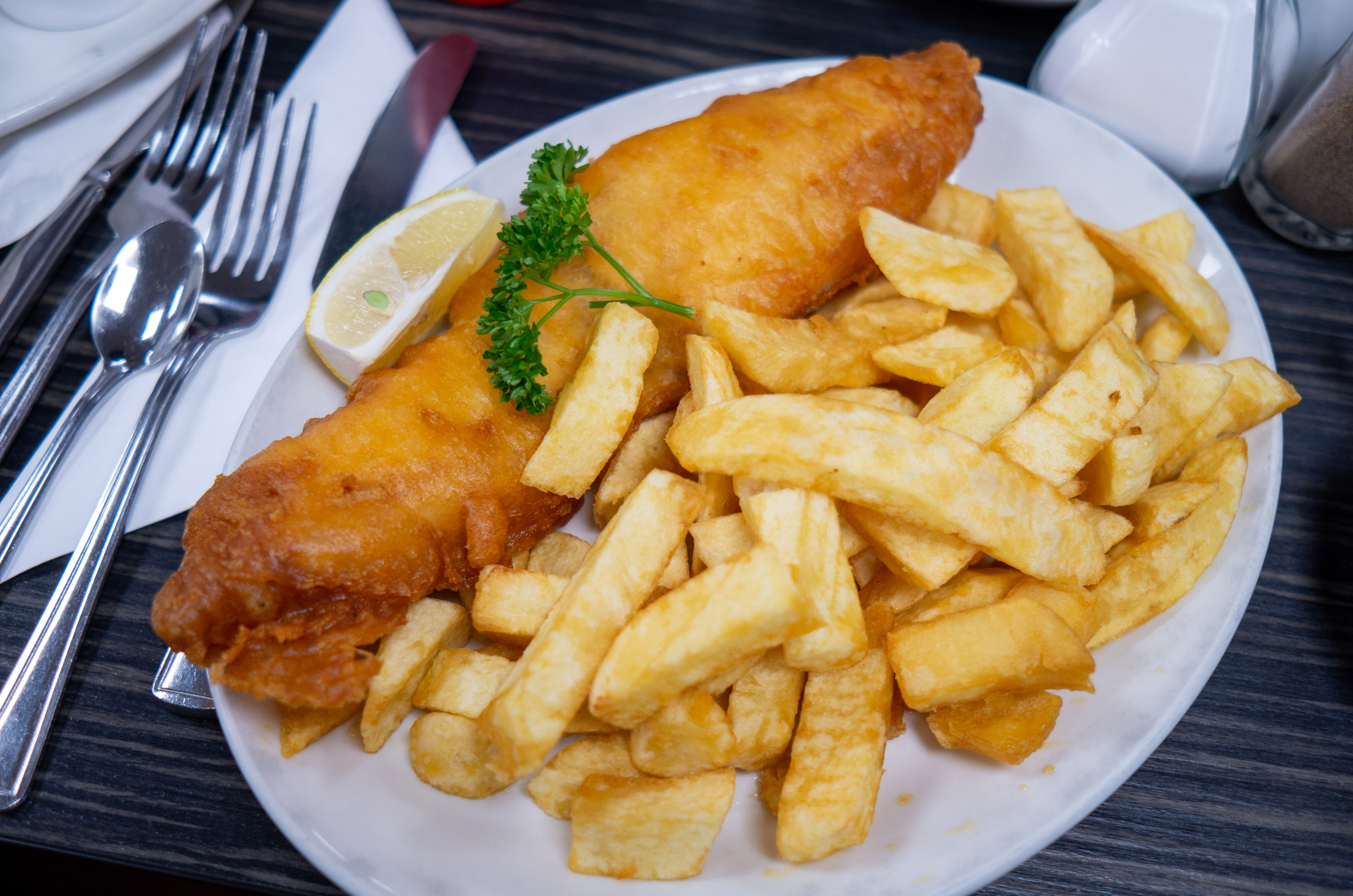
Fish and chips, an iconic staple of British cuisine

Throughout the 19th century, Iberian Jewish immigrants in London introduced their method of coating fish in flour, and later a mix of flour and water, before frying in oil. Fish, which was plentiful, affordable, and widely eaten on Fridays, led to the opening of the first fish and chip shop by Eastern European Jewish immigrant Joseph Malin. Combining fried fish with chips, often served with mushy peas and tartare sauce as fish and chips, proved to be an incredibly popular and affordable takeaway food among the working class. The popularity of the dish has led to it being termed one of Britain's national dishes.

The British staple of stewed meats further developed into more distinct dishes in the Victorian era. Lancashire hotpot, a dish served in the north-west of England around Liverpool and Manchester, consisting of a mutton or lamb stew topped with sliced potatoes and baked in a heavy pot, developed as a distinct regional dish. Like the Sunday roast, Lancashire hotpot could be left to cook slowly while the family worked, making it a popular choice for the growing working class. While a slowly steamed suet pudding of stewed beef had been common in British cuisine since the 18th century, it was not until the mid-19th century that cooks began to add kidneys, forming the steak and kidney pudding. Initially more of a regional dish, its ease of preparation and popularity led to it becoming recognised as a traditional British dish.

The continuing need for inexpensive and portable foods for the predominately industrial and urban working class, which had boosted the popularity of foods such as the Cornish pasty and the sandwich, led to the popularising of the sausage roll, consisting of seasoned sausage meat wrapped in puff pastry and baked golden-brown. While meats wrapped in dough were known in Ancient Greece and Rome, it was not until the 19th century that the sausage roll became widely available. Sausage rolls remain an indelible aspect of British culture and a widely popular snack food; the British bakery chain Greggs sells approximately 140 million of them every year.

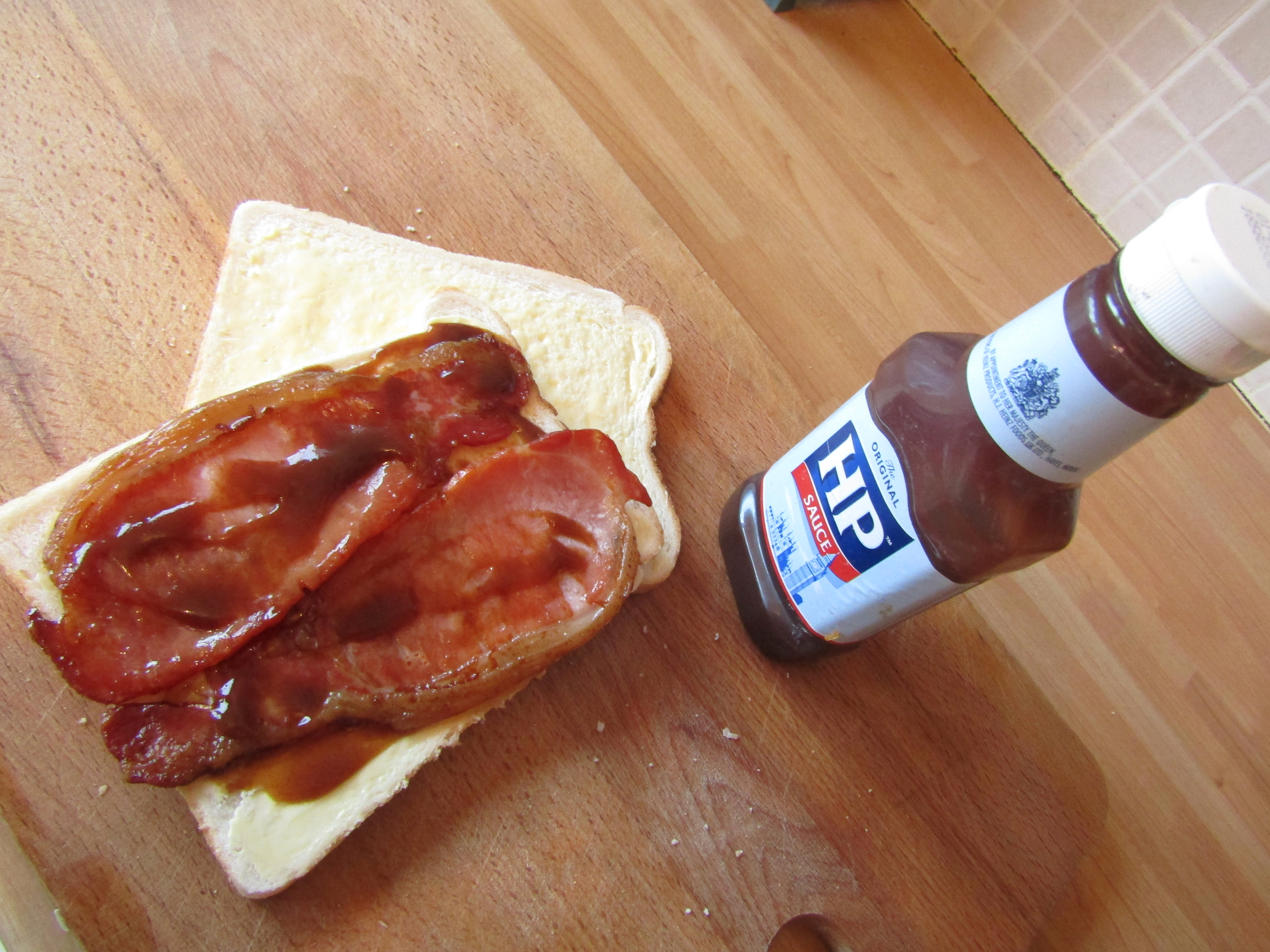
HP Sauce

It was during this time that mass-produced condiments became available thanks to industrialised food production. Worcestershire sauce, a fermented sauce made primarily of anchovies, vinegar, tamarind, and spices which had its roots in Ancient Roman garum and mushroom ketchup, was developed by chemists John Wheeley Lea and William Henry Perrins in the early 19th century. Today, Lea & Perrins remains the world's largest brand of Worcestershire sauce. In the early 19th century, Royal chefs produced brown sauce, typically made of tomatoes and molasses. A.1. Sauce was first developed in Royal kitchens, however it fell out of favour in the British domestic market, though it has enjoyed enduring popularity in American cuisine as a steak sauce. HP Sauce, named after the Houses of Parliament, made from tomatoes, molasses, vinegar, and spices was introduced in the late 19th century and became so popular it is now regarded as an iconic sauce of British cuisine.

The British love of sweet foods spurred increasing innovation in the field of desserts. The world's first documented recipe for the ice cream cone was published by English writer Agnes Marshall, consisting of baked almonds. Marshall is consequently considered the inventor of the ice cream cone. Battenberg cake, made by baking yellow and pink almond sponge cakes before being cut and arranged into a chequered pattern, held together by jam and covered with marzipan, originated in the late 19th century, purportedly named for the marriage of Princess Victoria, Queen Victoria's granddaughter, to Prince Louis of Battenberg in 1884.

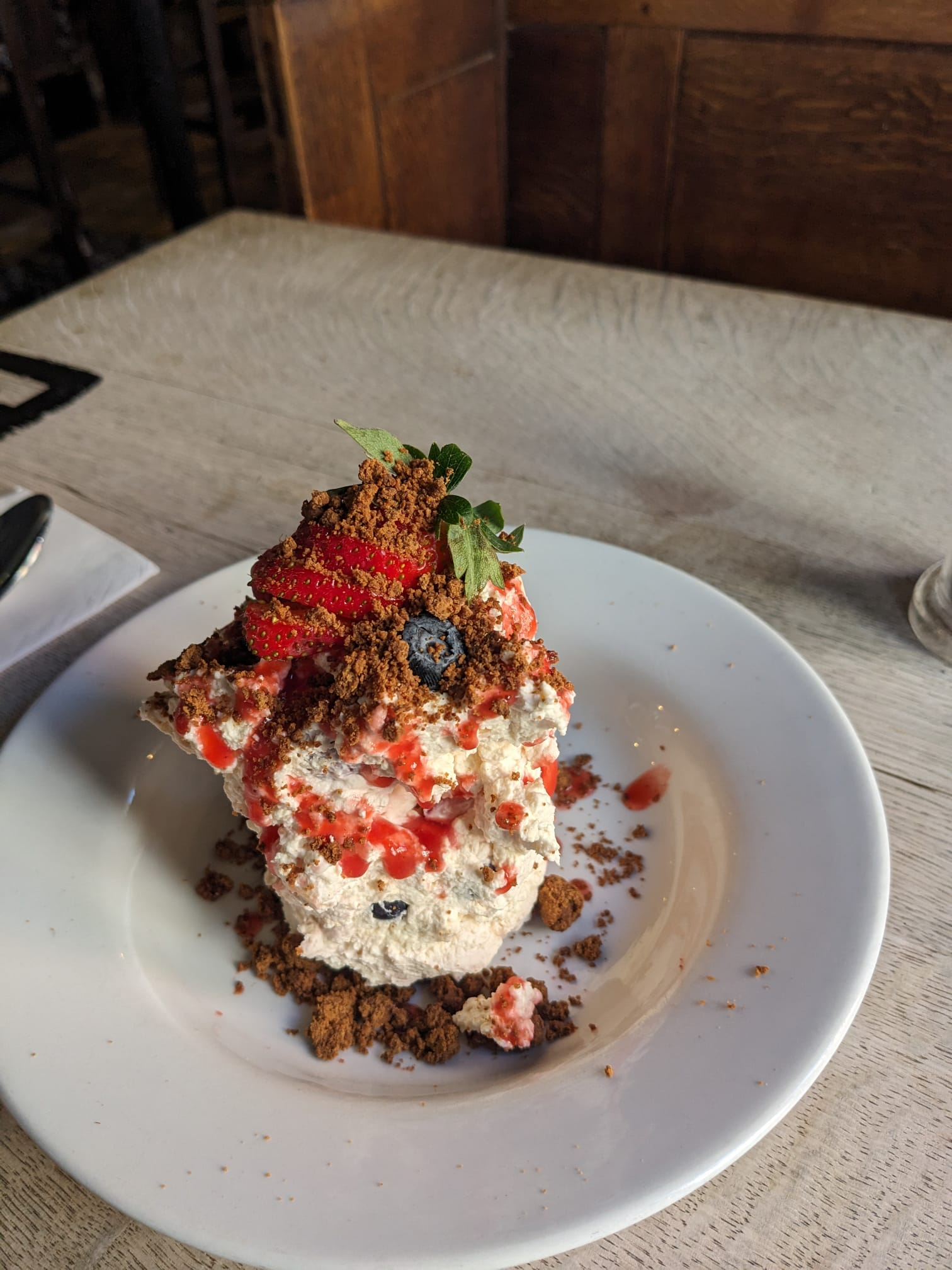
A plate of Eton Mess

The first printed recipe for Eton mess was published in 1893, a traditional dessert consisting of a mixture of strawberries, sweet meringue, and whipped cream. Madeira wine, popular in England in the mid-19th century, directly influenced the development of Madeira cake, a light sponge or butter cake traditionally flavoured with lemon, as an accompaniment to eat with the wine. Jam roly-poly, a simple dessert made of flat-rolled suet pudding spread with jam and rolled-up, similar to a Swiss roll, then steamed or baked and served with custard first emerged in the early 19th century. Its affordability, ease of production, and popularity led to it becoming a modern British classic.

Throughout the mid 19th century, innovations in food preservation and production allowed the mass-production of chocolate as a food, as opposed to primarily a drink. British Quakers, who were opposed to alcohol as a cause of moral sin, began to champion chocolate as an ethical alternative. Quakers came to establish three household chocolate brands which became worldwide names: Fry's, Rowntree's, and notably, Cadbury's, the latter of which would become the world's second-largest confectionary brand.

As gin regained popularity fears of a return to the Gin Craze led to the Beerhouse Act, which aimed to promote beer as a safer alternative and encourage the creation of controlled venues for workers in rapidly expanding industrial centres. The Act spurred a proliferation of public houses and increased beer consumption. As the 19th century progressed, many establishments underwent lavish refurbishment to compete with gin palaces, and to distinguish themselves from one another, further solidifying alcohol consumption as an integral part of British culture.

=== 20th century ===
The haute cuisine of the late Victorian era and early 20th century was heavily influenced by French cuisine, with groundbreaking chefs such as Escoffier recruited by the Savoy Hotel in London. While beans on toast was being eaten by the end of the 19th century, a marketing push by Heinz in 1927 led to the widespread popularity of the dish as a quick and cheap snack. Britain hosts the largest Heinz food processing plant in the world, (Note: In Wigan, England, producing 3 million cans a day.) and Britons may eat more baked beans than any other country.

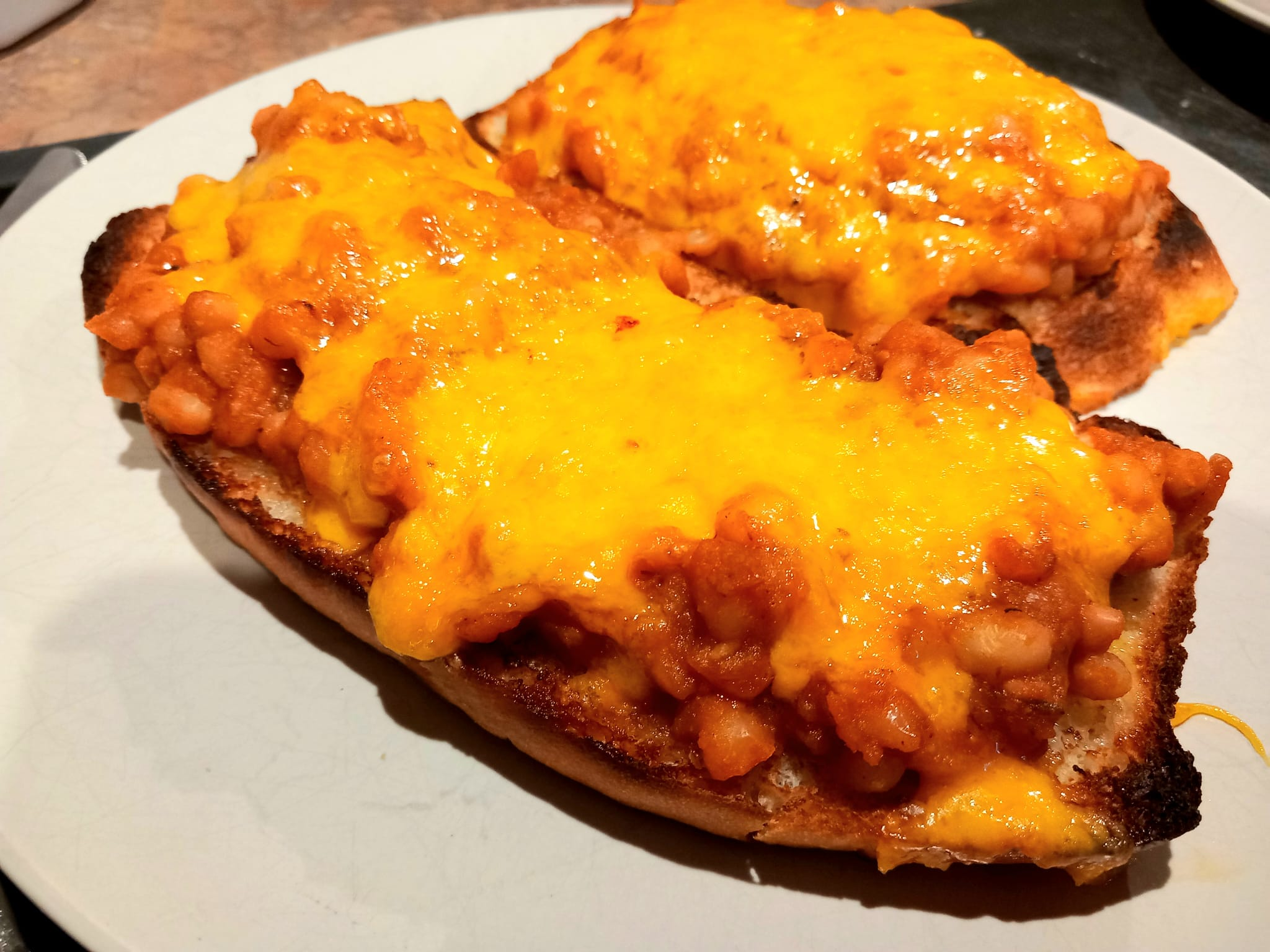
Homemade beans on toast, topped with melted cheese

However, British cuisine for much of the 20th century was severely impacted by the effects of rationing during the First and Second World Wars. The latter half of the First World War saw voluntary rationing, which limited the average citizen to a daily 1,680-calorie (7,000 kJ) ration of butter or margarine, sugar, tea, jam, bacon, and other meat. Unlike elsewhere in Europe, bread was not rationed. During the war, average energy intake decreased by only 3%, but protein intake by 6%. Rationing after the First World War was not lifted in full until 1920, some two years after the war's end.

Rationing during the Second World War was much more significant, widespread, and tightly controlled by the state. Rationing continued for nearly a full decade after the war, and restrictions were made stricter in 1947 than during the war itself. As a result, many children of the Silent and Boomer generations were raised without access to many previously common ingredients. For example, in 1942, many young children when questioned about bananas did not believe they were a real fruit. Bread was not rationed until after the war ended, but was replaced by a "national loaf" of wholemeal which was found to be mushy and grey. Fish was not rationed, but hundreds of fishing trawlers were requisitioned for military use by the Royal Navy and fish supplies dropped by nearly a third of pre-war levels, resulting in increased prices at fishmongers. Owing to its popularity and morale-boosting comfort food qualities, fish and chips was one of the few dishes not subject to rationing. Though not rationed, most alcoholic drinks except beer were scarce, and there was a ban on importing sugar for brewing. Many pubs in 1945 ran out of pint glasses, as glass itself was in short supply and many patrons wishing to celebrate the end of the war at their local would recall a lengthy wait to be served; owing to wait on patrons finishing drinks so as their glass could be washed and reused.

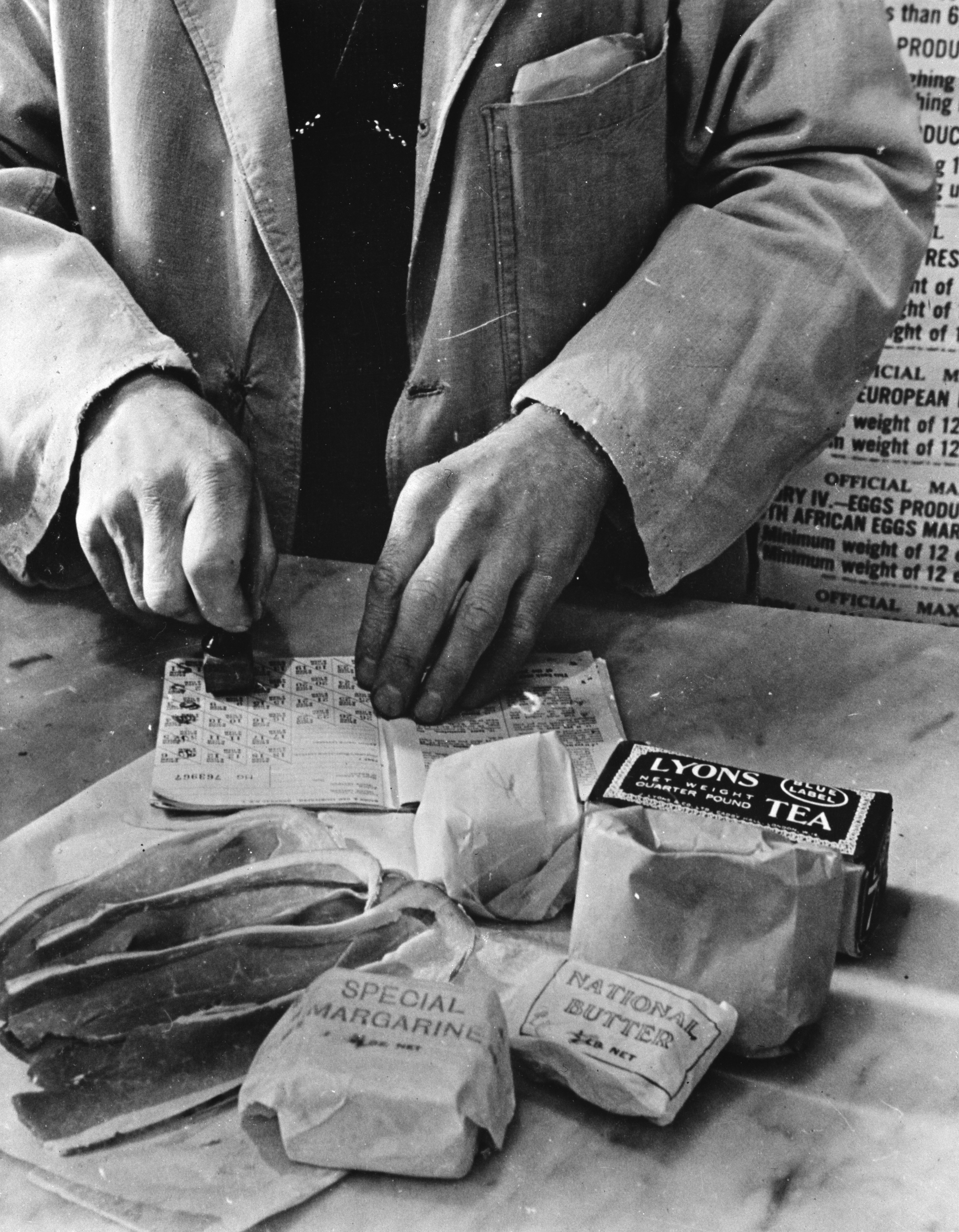
A shopkeeper cancels the coupons in a British housewife's ration book in 1943.

Restaurants were initially exempt from rationing, but this policy was subsequently reversed after public outrage that "luxury" foods were being enjoyed by wealthier classes while the rest of the population were subject to tightly controlled rationing. The Government subsequently introduced new restrictions on restaurants; capping prices, limiting the serving time of meals, and limiting the ingredients that could be used. A standard weekly ration by the war's end consisted of 4 oz (110 g) of bacon, 1 shilling 2d (equivalent to £2.24 in 2025) of meat, 8 oz (230 g) of sugar, 2 oz (57 g) of loose tea, 2 oz (57 g) of cheese, 2 lb (0.91 kg) of marmalade (or 1 lb of either preserves or sugar), 2 oz (57 g) of butter, 4 oz (110 g) of margarine, and 2 oz (57 g) of lard. Additionally, 12 oz (340 g) of sweets were allowed on a monthly basis. There was an allowance for vegetarians, who, in exchange for surrendering their meat coupons, could receive double rations of cheese instead.

After the war ended, rationing was kept in place, partially to help feed people in European areas whose economies had been virtually destroyed by the fighting, but also because resources were unavailable to expand food production and imports. Frequent strikes, critically by dock workers, only exacerbated the dire situation. The most common form of rationing fraud, was people using ration books of those who had died as a means to acquire extra food. In the years following the war, the bacon ration was cut by a quarter, and poor harvests resulted in the introduction of potato rationing, Due to the austerity measures that were kept in place or expanded (with the exception of the new National Health Service) by the postwar Labour government, the Conservatives rallied support from disgruntled housewives that led them to victory at the 1951 general election. The Conservative government formally abolished rationing entirely in 1954, although the effects of rationing severely impacted the food production industry for decades to come. For example, cheese production virtually ground to a halt, and some varieties of British cheese came close to disappearing altogether; with the cheese industry not fully recovering until the 1990s.

Wartime rationing and subsequent food scarcity at a time when British culinary traditions were strong, likely contributed to a sharp decline of the international reputation of British cuisine. The Good Food Guide in the 1960s described the food of the previous decade as "intolerable" due to food shortages of even simple ingredients such as butter, cream, and meat.

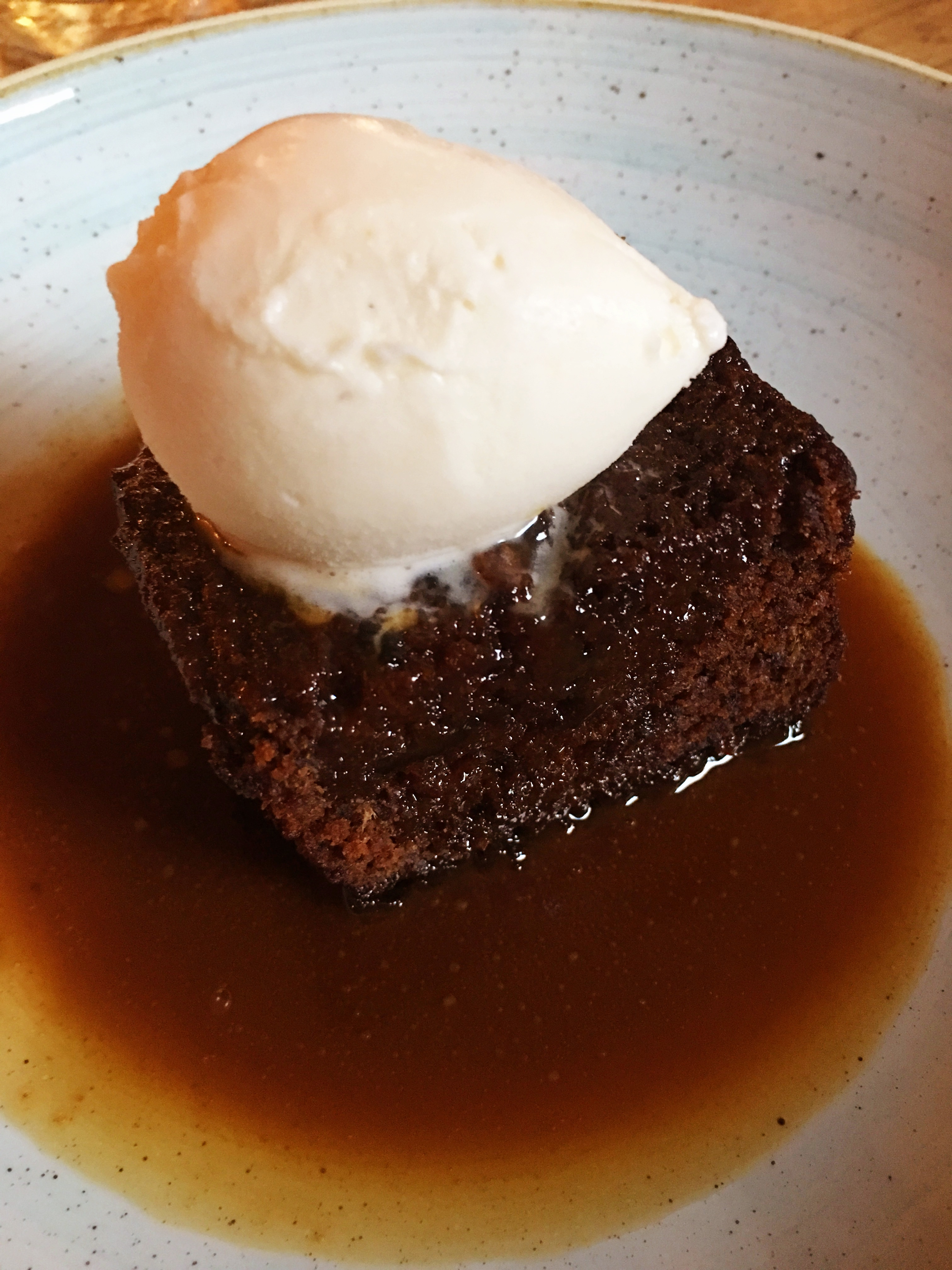
Sticky toffee pudding, served with vanilla ice cream

Rationing helped to spur innovation in recipes as food shortages compelled creativity. The natural sweetness of carrots, a vegetable whose consumption was promoted by the Government, were favoured as an alternative to sugar. Carrot cake, though it had its origins in a 16th-century recipe, exploded in popularity across Britain. Crumble, a sweet dish of baked fruit filling topped with a streusel grew in popularity during and after the war, due to the topping being easier and less expensive to produce compared to pastry. The Ploughman's lunch, initially a simple rustic meal of bread, cheese, beer, and pickled onions emerged in the 1950s, though it didn't achieve widespread popularity until the 1970s where it was favoured due to its simplicity, ease of preparation, and high profit margin due to it not containing meat; though modern variations of the meal include pork pies. The Bakewell tart, a variant of the Bakewell pudding, made of a shortcrust pastry shell beneath layers of jam, frangipane, and topped with flaked almonds developed in the 20th century. The sticky toffee pudding, now a widely-popular dessert of a muffin-like sponge cake covered in a toffee sauce made from cream and dark sugars, served with custard or vanilla ice cream, developed in the north-west of England, where it is seem as a regional culinary symbol.

==== Anglo-Indian cuisine ====
Throughout the 1970s onwards, huge waves of migration to Britain came from India, Pakistan, and Bangladesh. Many of these immigrants were recruited to fulfill the labour shortages that resulted from the Second World War. British Indians became a distinct ethnic identity in Britain who began to incorporate their own culinary traditions to a new market. In 1951, there were only 30,000 persons of Indian descent and 10,000 of Pakistani descent living in Britain. By the turn of the millennium in 2001, there were 1,053,411 persons of Indian descent, 747,000 of Pakistani descent, and 283,063 of Bangladeshi descent living in Britain, representing a significant portion of Britain's foreign-born or foreign descent population. Hungry for more exotic flavours that had disappeared during wartime rationing and keen to feed a diversifying clientele, Indian restaurants that had previously only catered to Indians began adapting classic Indian recipes for the British palette, and "going for an Indian" became a popular dining and takeaway option for a population recovering from the impact of war.

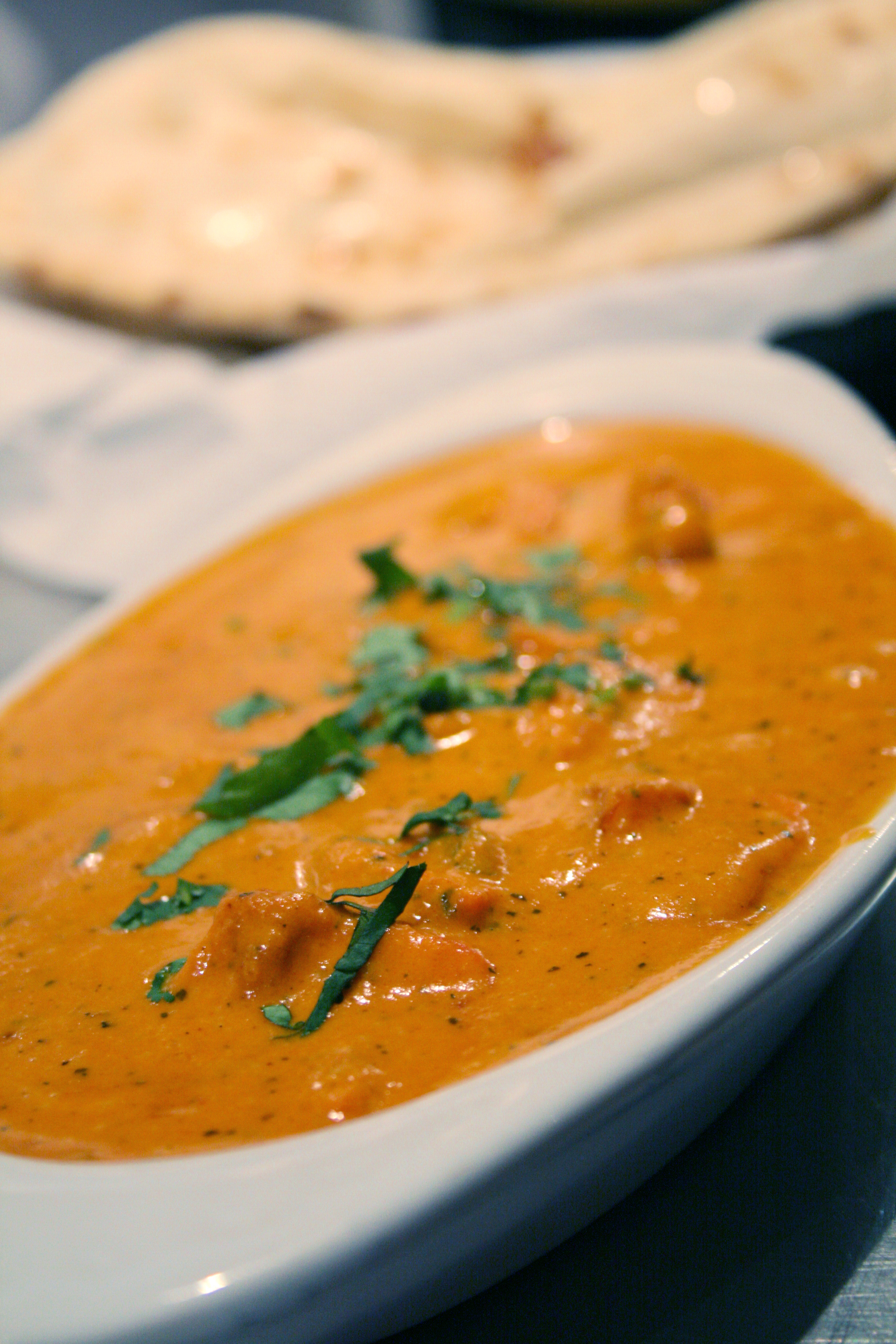
Chicken tikka masala

Coronation chicken, a dish created for the coronation of Queen Elizabeth II in 1953, drew on Britain's historic Indian influence, by preparing boneless chicken mixed in a curry of cumin, turmeric, ginger, cream, and dried apricots or sultanas. The dish remains a popular sandwich filling. Chicken tikka masala, likely created by Bangladeshi chefs in the early 1960s, a dish of chicken tikka marinated in spiced yoghurt then roasted, served in a sauce typically made of pureed tomatoes, cream, coconut cream and a masala spice mix, similar to butter chicken, developed as a distinctly unique Anglo-Indian dish. Its popularity has led it to being termed a "true British national dish", and constitutes approximately 15% of orders in British Indian restaurants. A British version of balti cuisine, a type of curry popular in Northern India and Pakistan based on garlic, onions, turmeric, and garam masala stir-fried in vegetable oil (as opposed to ghee and simmered as in Indian cuisine) was developed in Birmingham in 1977.

British Indian dishes are largely based on the Madras curry sauce, the name referring to the region of India where spices were obtained as opposed to an actual dish, and dishes are varied by modifying the base sauce. Vindaloo, for example, was adapted in British cuisine from a Portuguese dish as a spicier version of the standard "medium" restaurant curry sauce, with the addition of vinegar, potatoes, and chilli peppers, and is often the spiciest dish on British Indian menus. A poll by YouGov in 2016 found that the most popular Indian dish in Britain was the korma (selected by 18% of respondents), followed by chicken tikka masala, jalfrezi, madras, rogan josh, biryani, balti, bhuna, dupiaza, and vindaloo. Indian cuisine is now the most popular foreign cuisine in Britain.

British curries differ significantly from their Indian counterparts, generally being thicker and sweeter. Curry sauces in Britain are often used as bases that are interchangeable between meats, while in India, specific meats have their own non-interchangeable sauce. A key ingredient to British curry is curry powder, a "British concoction" of spices that was created by British merchants to approximate the flavour of the various foods they encountered in India. In turn, British traders introduced the spice mix to Meiji Japan in the mid-19th century, leading to the creation of Japanese curry.

==== British Chinese cuisine ====
Like Indian food, hunger for more exotic flavours spurred the development of a distinct version of Chinese cuisine that had been adapted for British tastes. British rule over Hong Kong and the New Territories became an integral part of international shipping routes, and many European companies enlisted Southern Chinese men as sailors, who in turn resettled in Britain. As with Indian immigrants, Britain recruited large numbers of Chinese peoples in the 1950s and 1960s to fill the labour void that had been created as a result of the war. Consequently, the number of Chinese food establishments doubled, with a large portion of these catering to non-Chinese clientele. These restaurants were largely operated by Hong Kongers who had resettled in Britain.

Many fish and chip shops, particularly in Liverpool, were operated by Chinese immigrants, which resulted in curry sauce and chips, staple foods in British chip shops, being incorporated into Anglicised Chinese food in a departure from authentic Chinese cuisine. British Chinese restaurants have developed original recipes, such as crispy duck pancakes as a variation on peking duck; jar jow, a stir-fried dish of sliced char siu, bamboo shoots, onions, and green peppers seasoned with chilli powder and tomato paste; and salt and pepper chips, made of chips stir-fried with five-spice powder, peppers, and onions. However, American-style Chinese dishes such as chop suey and Americanised chow mein have become more popular, as well as increasingly authentic Chinese dishes.

British Chinese cuisine is considered a major component of British cuisine owing to its widespread popularity; in 2017, over 80% of Londoners reported having been to a Chinese takeaway. By the end of the century, virtually every city, town, and village in Britain had at least one Chinese takeaway or restaurant.

==== Foreign influence and modern British cuisine ====
Writers such as Elizabeth David, who from 1950 produced evocative books beginning with A Book of Mediterranean Food featuring ingredients which were then virtually impossible to find in Britain, helped increase Britain's appetite for foreign cuisine. David helped to inspire Italian cuisine to become the most popular Mediterranean cuisine in Britain. While Italian restaurants had operated in Britain before the Second World War, they served generalised haute cuisine. It was only after the war that cheaper Italian coffee bars appeared, trading on their Italian identity and selling cheap and rustic Italian dishes such as minestrone soup, spaghetti, and pizza. From the early 1960s, trattoria restaurants offered more elaborate dishes such as lasagne verdi al forno, which is baked lasagne coloured with spinach. Pizza Express, now a multinational pizza restaurant chain, was founded in 1965 in London by Peter Boizot. The popularity of Italian food in Britain has led to an increasing demand for more authentic Italian cuisine, as with Indian and Chinese food. Other Mediterranean influences include Greek moussaka, feta, and taramasalata, Turkish doner and shish kebabs, and Levantine hummus. French cuisine in Britain is predominately expressed as an haute cuisine restricted to expensive restaurants, although some inexpensive French bistros operate in Britain. From the 1980s onwards, Thai and Vietnamese cuisine began to gain popularity in Britain.

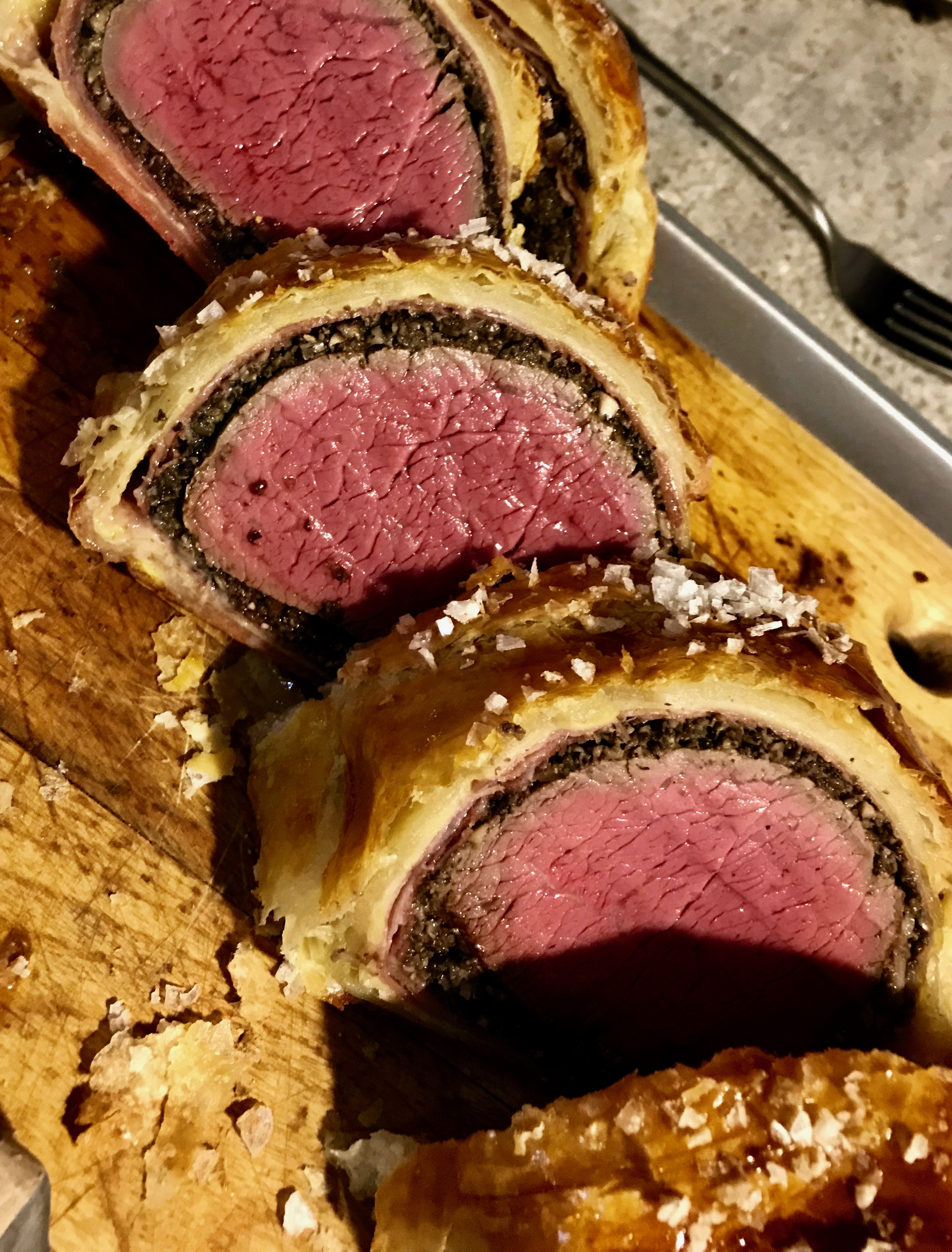
Slices of Beef Wellington

From the 1970s increasing numbers of foreign-style restaurants, and increasing accessibility to a wider range of fresh ingredients widened the popularity of foreign cuisine. However, there was an increased push to recognise a distinct British cuisine. The English Tourist Board campaigned for restaurants to include more traditional and regional British dishes on their menus. In the 1980s and particularly the 1990s, this developed into a style of cooking known as "Modern British" as an effort to construct a national cuisine for the tourist industry, reinterpreting classic British dishes and fusing them with foreign influence.

Some British dishes became more associated with a distinctly British haute cuisine such as beef Wellington, a dish of flash-seared beef tenderloin coated in English mustard, and a duxelles of mushrooms, onions, herbs, and black pepper, sometimes bound with prosciutto or pâté, and wrapped in either shortcrust or puff pastry, brushed with egg wash and baked.

==== Celebrity chefs ====
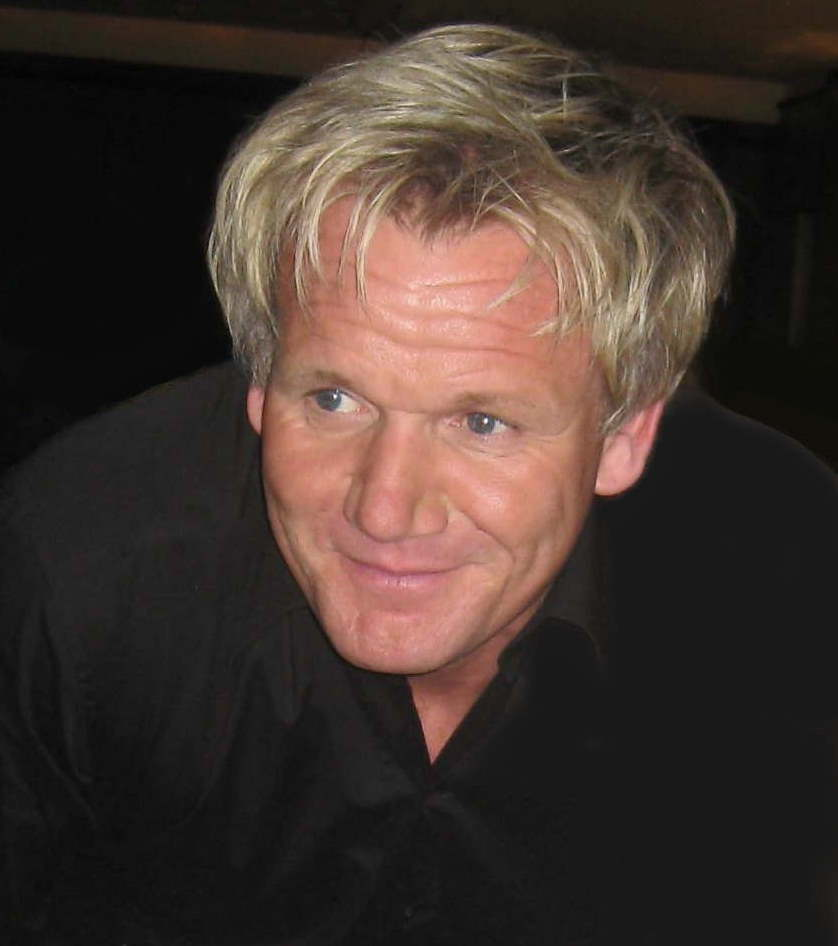
Gordon Ramsay in 2010. Ramsay's restaurants hold 17 Michelin stars, the most of any British chef

The modern phenomenon of television "celebrity chefs" began in Britain with Philip Harben and Fanny Cradock, who appeared on television shows throughout the 1950s to the 1970s. Toward the end of the century in the 1980s and 1990s, with greater public access to radio and television, the phenomenon reached new heights when gaining a Michelin star increased the profile and reputation of chefs. Marco Pierre White became the youngest chef in the world, as well as the first British chef, to achieve three Michelin stars, a record he held for 8 years, and has been dubbed as the first true celebrity chef. White's popularity made him a household name, and one of his cookbooks, White Heat, was described in 2005 as "possibly the most influential recipe book of the last 20 years".

One of White's protégés, Gordon Ramsay, achieved considerable success in London which led to the commissioning of Boiling Point, following Ramsay's eponymous solo restaurant. Ramsay's aggressive and fiery persona contributed to his success with a wide variety of other television shows, and he consequently became one of the most influential chefs in the world. Ramsay's restaurants have earned a total of 17 Michelin stars, the third highest for a single chef in the world, and the most for any British chef.

Dedicated food-related television channels and programming such as the Good Food Channel and Ready Steady Cook led to chefs such as Rick Stein, Jamie Oliver, Ainsley Harriott, Gary Rhodes, Delia Smith, Nigella Lawson, Nigel Slater, Keith Floyd, and Simon Hopkinson becoming household names.

=== 21st century ===
British cuisine has continued to evolve throughout the 21st century. Some of Britain's more classic dishes have fallen out of favour with the modern British public. A 2021 survey by Mortar Research found more than 28% of Britons had never eaten toad in the hole, and many traditional dishes and ingredients were even believed to be imaginary by the following percentages of the population: 20% for toad in the hole, 18% for spotted dick, 13% for Eton mess, 11% for bangers and mash and Scotch eggs, and 10% for black pudding. However, other classic foods have remained popular, with 90% having eaten a Cornish pasty at some point in their lives. Snack foods such as sausage rolls also remain popular, with the bakery chain Greggs selling 140 million per year.

Eating habits and recipes have been affected by rising vegetarianism and veganism; a 2021 YouGov survey found 8% of Britons were now eating a plant-based diet, and more than a third said they were interested in becoming vegan. In 2023, government reports found that meat and fish consumption were at their lowest levels since record-keeping began in 1974.

Debora Robertson, writing in The Daily Telegraph, argues that all aspects of British cuisine have undergone a culinary revolution, shedding the spectres of wartime rationing and post-war food scarcity, and its standards now rival those of France. This has been reflected in the number of Michelin starred restaurants in Britain: as of August 2026, the Michelin Guide has recognised 1,120 restaurants in Britain, with 10 restaurants awarded the coveted three stars. Six of these are in London alone, (Note: These include: Restaurant Gordon Ramsay, Alain Ducasse at The Dorchester, Sketch, CORE by Clare Smyth, Hélène Darroze at The Connaught, and The Ledbury) more than any other city in the world except for Paris and Tokyo. (Note: Paris has 9, and Tokyo 11. Hong Kong has 7 three-starred restaurants, but is a special administrative region of China, and not a city.) Three of the ten three-star restaurants specialise in British cuisine. (Note: These include; CORE by Clare Smyth, Moor Hall, and L'Enclume) In 2010, The Waterside Inn in Bray became the first restaurant outside of France to retain three Michelin stars for a quarter of a century. The Fat Duck, a three-Michelin-star restaurant, also in Bray, was named the world's best restaurant in 2005. As of August 2026, there are 199 restaurants in Britain with at least one Michelin star, (Note: 10 three-stars, 23 two-stars, and 166 one-stars) only 71 fewer than the entirety of the United States. Of these, 71 restaurants specialise in some variation of British cuisine. (Note: These include British Contemporary (2), Creative British (5), Modern British (56), Scottish (1), and Traditional British (7).)

The late 1990s and particularly the early 21st century saw a major shift in British pubs. While many pubs had a long tradition of serving food, owing to their historic heritage as traveller's inns, many pubs were solely drinking establishments and little emphasis was placed on food, other than simple meals such as sandwiches, and bar snacks, usually pork scratchings, pickled eggs, crisps, and peanuts. These foods with their strong emphasis on salt, which dries out the mouth, were specifically intended to increase beer sales. By the turn of the century with the widespread introduction of microwave ovens and frozen food, the quality of food pubs served had declined but variety increased, with most pubs serving steak and ale pie, shepherd's pie, fish and chips, bangers and mash, Sunday roast, ploughman's lunch, chicken tikka masala, and pasties, as well as foods typically indicative of other cultures, such as burgers, chicken wings, lasagne and chilli con carne.

In 1991 the term gastropub, a portmanteau of "gastronomy" and "pub", was coined when David Eyre and Mike Belben took over The Eagle pub in London. Gastropubs are defined as pubs that serve high-quality food comparable with a restaurant, with near-equal emphases on eating and drinking. Gastropubs caused a significant shift in British dining and pub culture, with the term being added to Merriam Webster's Collegiate Dictionary in 2012, and the gastropub concept being exported overseas where it found significant popularity in the United States and Canada. The renewed emphasis on food quality in gastropubs has led many to be awarded Michelin stars: the gastropub The Hand & Flowers in Marlow became the first pub ever to be awarded two Michelin stars.

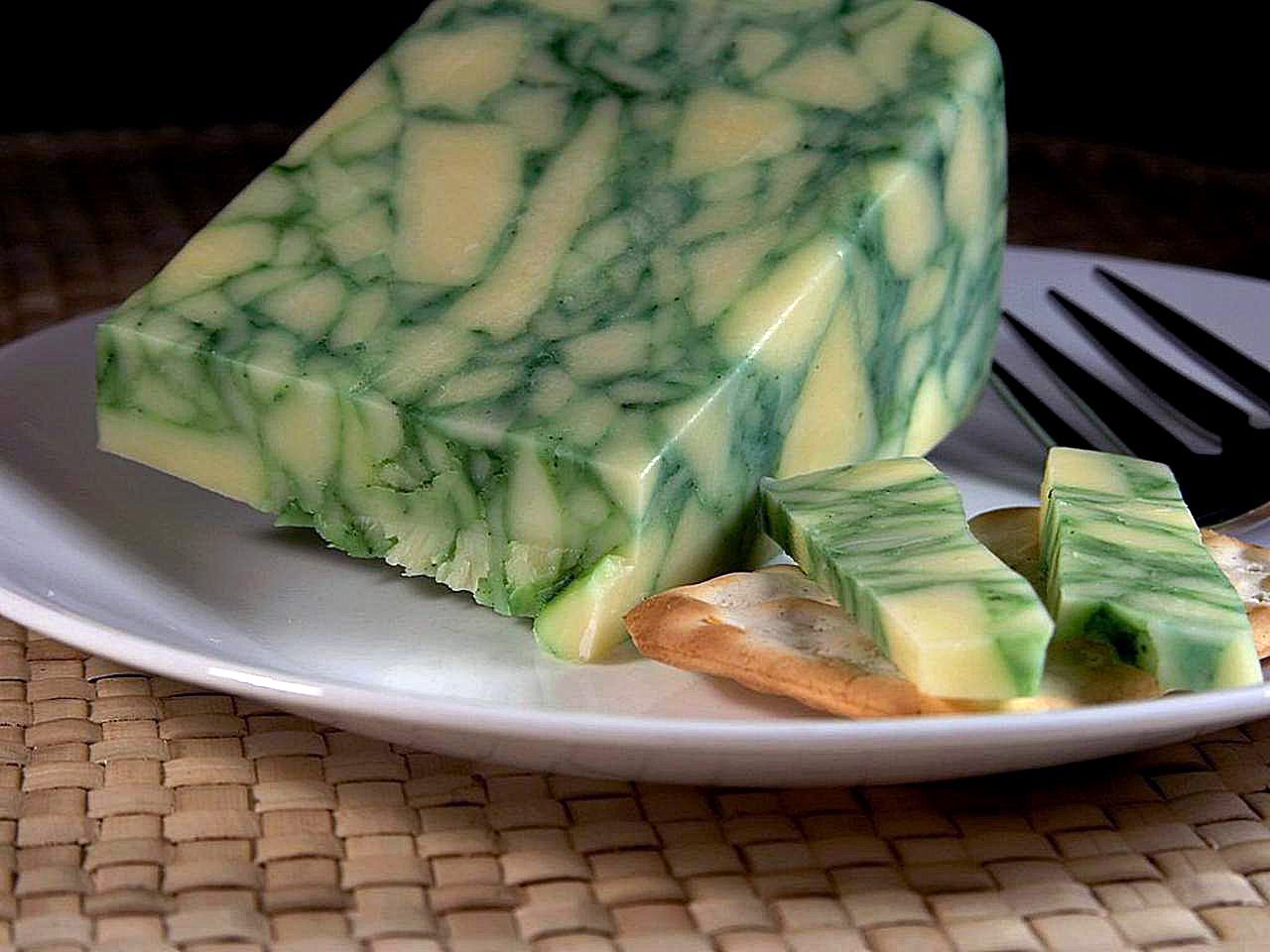
Sage Derby, a British marbled semi-hard cheese

The popularity and growth of gastropubs has been such that, in 2011, The Good Food Guide suggested that there was no longer any need to distinguish traditional pubs from gastropubs in any meaningful way, and the term had become irrelevant. Gastropubs have attracted criticism, however, from those arguing that they have gentrified traditional pubs, causing them to lose their quaint character.

==== British cheesemaking ====
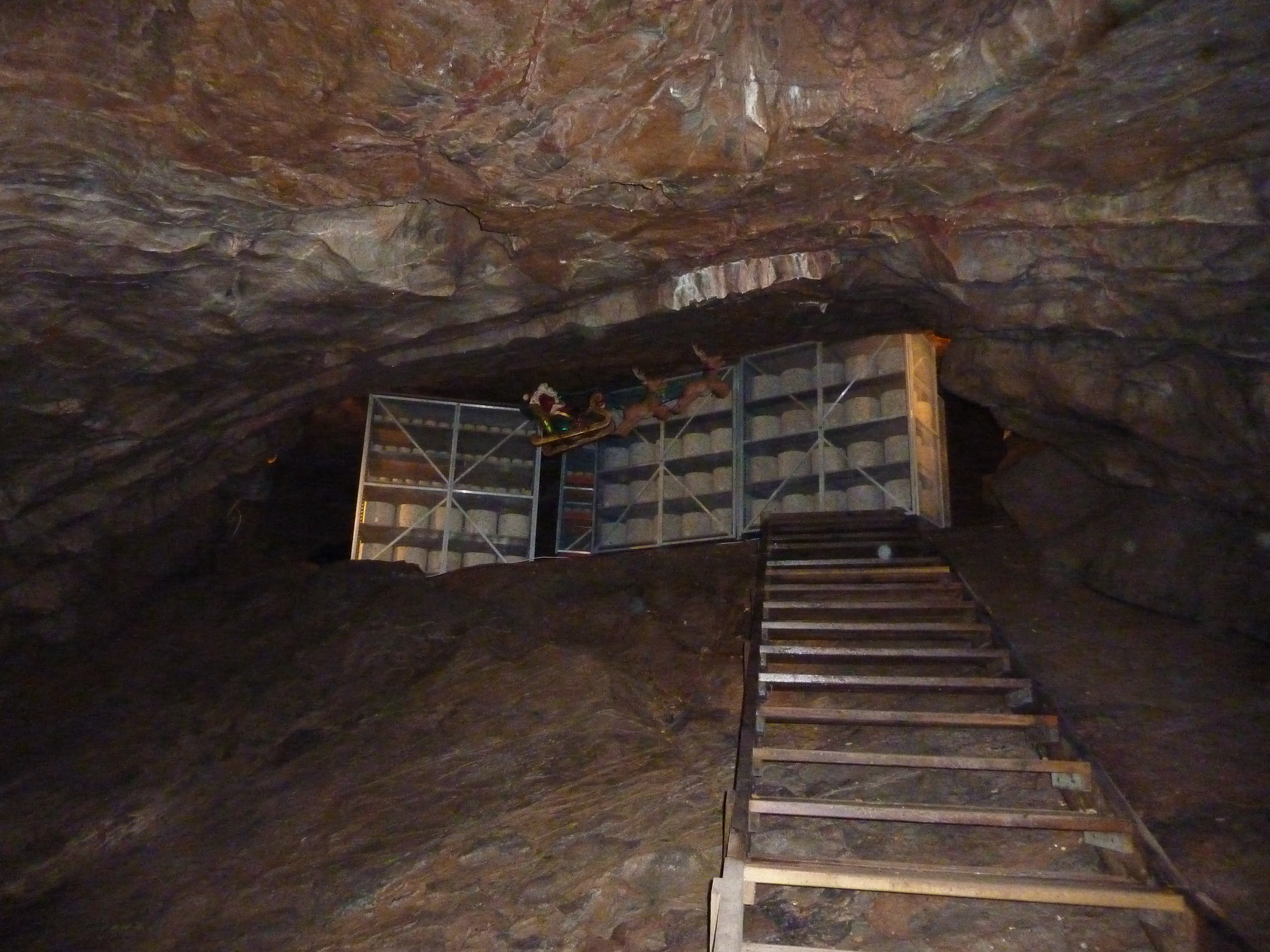
Cheddar cheese maturing in the caves at Cheddar Gorge

British cheesemaking had been almost wiped out by the effects of wartime rationing: there were about 15,000 cheesemakers in Britain prior to the First World War, but this had reduced to 126 by the end of the Second World War. British cheesemaking did not begin to recover until the 1980s, particularly through the loosening of regulations imposed by the Milk Marketing Board. There has been a major revival in British cheesemaking in the early 21st century: over 1,400 varieties of cheese are now produced, estimated to be more than France by some counts.

Cheddar, a relatively hard cheese native to Somerset but now produced globally, is by far the most popular cheese in Britain, accounting for 51% of its £1.9 billion annual cheese market, and is the most popular type of cheese in the world. British cheddar is traditionally matured in caves in Cheddar Gorge, which provide the ideal humidity and stable temperature for maturation, and may have been used since prehistoric times for this purpose.

In 2019, Cornish Kern, a hard cow's milk cheese, won the annual World Cheese Awards, beating well-known overseas varieties such as Brie, Gouda, and Parmesan. Stilton, a semi-soft crumbly blue cheese, was cited by English novelist George Orwell as "the best cheese of its type in the world", naming Wensleydale as a close second. The latter is famous for its association with British cartoon Wallace & Gromit; the cartoon's popularity led to a significant increase in demand for the cheese, saving the Wensleydale Creamery from financial ruin.

== National and regional cuisines ==
=== English ===
English cuisine has many distinctive attributes of its own, but shares much with wider British cuisine due to England's socio-economic dominance in the union. The various regions and counties of England have developed their own distinct foods and dishes. Dishes such as fish & chips and curry are popular nationally in England.

==== West Country ====
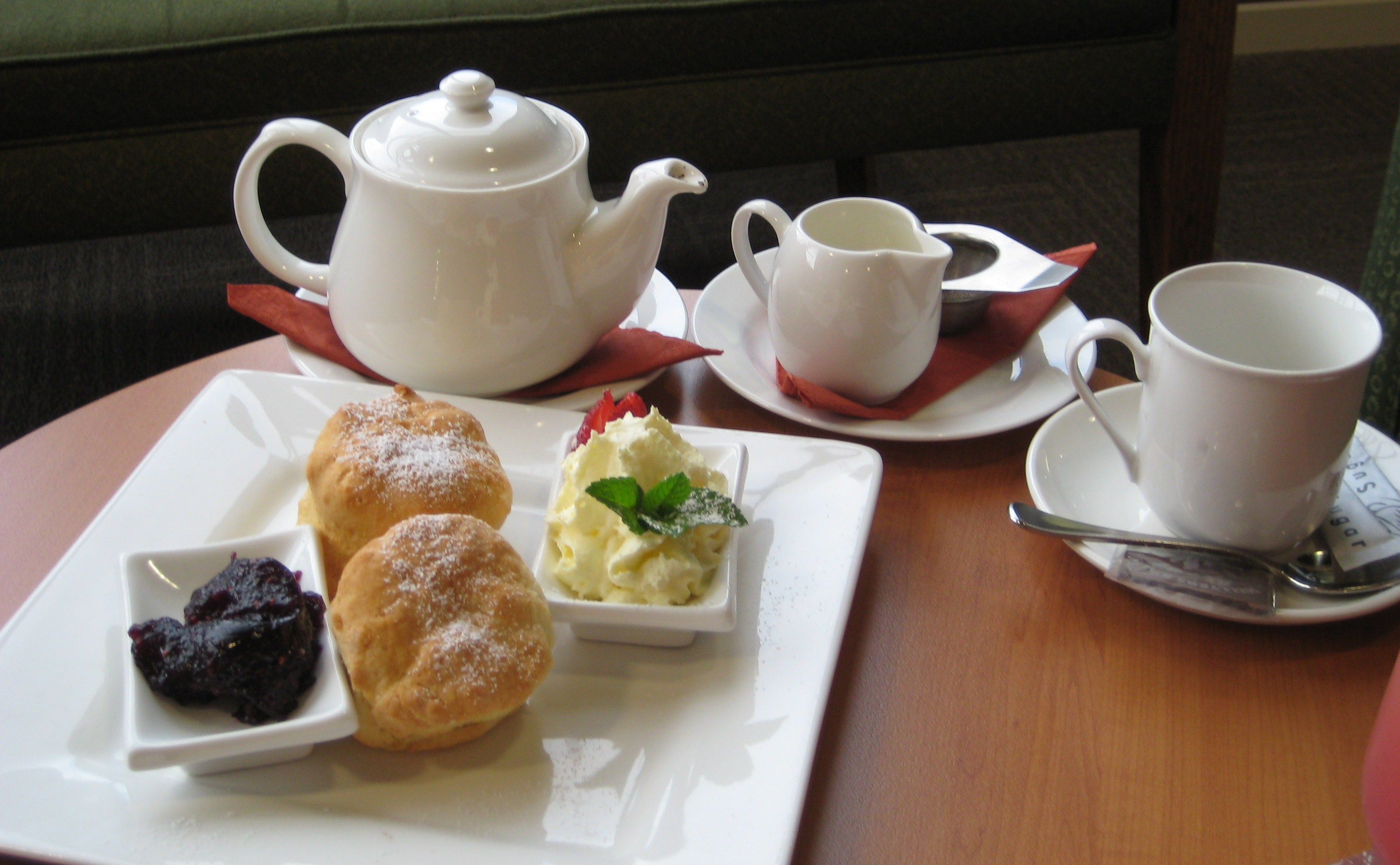
A Devon cream tea

The West Country is a loosely defined area of South West England. (Note: Generally accepted to be the counties of Cornwall, Devon, Dorset, Somerset, and Bristol, but some consider it to extend to encompass Wiltshire, Gloucestershire, and Herefordshire. For the purposes of this article, the definition shall include the latter three counties.)

The West Country is known for its artisanal cheeses, such as West Country Farmhouse Cheddar, a type of cheddar cheese, which has received PDO status, requiring that the cheese be made in Somerset, Dorset, Devon, or Cornwall using traditional methods, such as using raw milk, traditional animal rennet, and cloth wrapping. West Country traditions came to dominate cream tea, a type of afternoon tea consisting of tea, scones, clotted cream, jam, and butter. The Cornish method calls for jam to be spread on the scones first with clotted cream on top, while the Devonshire method inverts this, with the cream first then the jam. Squab pie is a traditional dish from the region, though despite its name it does not contain squab (a young domestic pigeon), but contains mutton and apples. Seafood such as mackerel, scallops, haddock, cod, brown crab, lobster, whiting, hake, squid, gurnard, and monkfish are caught frequently across the long coastline of the West Country, and are prized for their quality. Scrumpy, a variety of cider is common throughout the West Country and is the traditional drink of Devon.

Cornwall particularly has a strong culinary heritage. The county is home to the largest fishing port in the UK by value of fish landed, and is known for its wide range of restaurants. The seafood industry attracted celebrity chefs such as Rick Stein and Jamie Oliver to open restaurants in the county. An infamous local dish is stargazy pie, a fish pie in which the heads of the fish stick through the crust, as though "star-gazing". Cornwall's iconic dish is the pasty, a baked pastry dish traditionally filled with meat, vegetables, and seasoning, though many varieties including vegetarian fillings exist today.

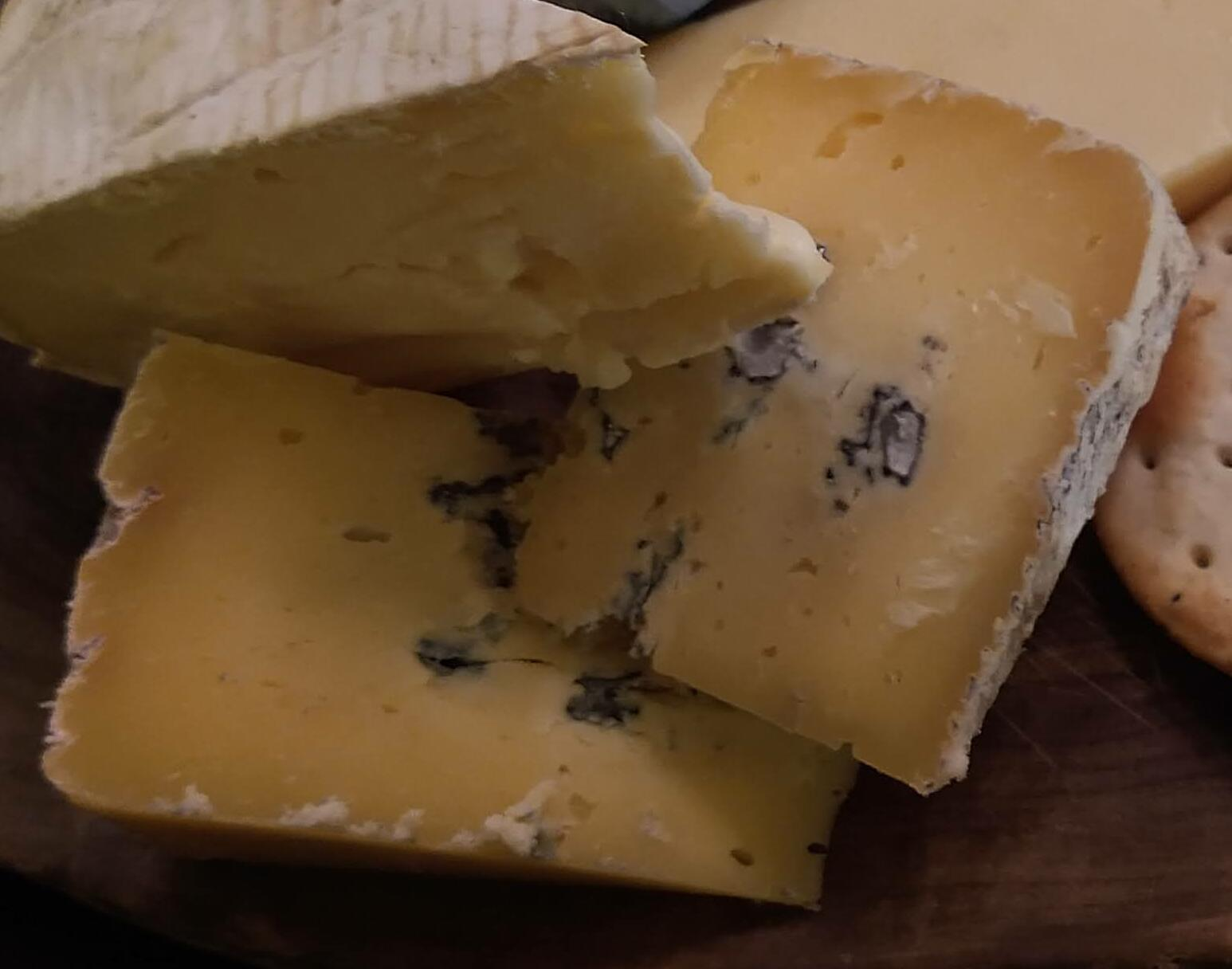
Cornish blue cheese

Over 60 varieties of cheese are produced in Cornwall, and Cornish cheeses have won many awards. Varieties include Davidstow Cheddar and Cathedral City Cheddar, with 1,000 tonnes of the cheeses being made per week; a local variety of Brie; Cornish Blue, a blue cheese which won the 2010 World Cheese Awards; Gevrik, a soft, full-fat goat's milk cheese; Tesyn, a variety of smoked cheese; and Cornish Yarg, a semi-hard cow's milk cheese wrapped in nettle leaves to form an edible rind. Cornwall is famous for its clotted cream, which has protected origin under EU law, and forms the basis of local varieties of fudge and ice cream.

Neighbouring Devon produces a variety of alcoholic beverages; the county produces a large amount of beer, while Plymouth Gin enjoys protected origin status. Devon also boasts a number of vineyards producing white wine, while Buckfast Tonic Wine, a fortified wine with added caffeine, historically produced by the monks of Buckfast Abbey is still produced today. The fertile Tamar Valley produces an exceptional number of traditional varieties of apples specific to Devon's orchards, along with rare varieties of other fruits such as the Dittisham plum. Ranges of cheeses, such as Curworthy, Sharpham, and Vulscombe are produced all over Devon, while specific Devon Blue and Beenleigh Blue cheeses are made at the Sharpham Estate. Harbourne Blue cheese is also made in Devon.

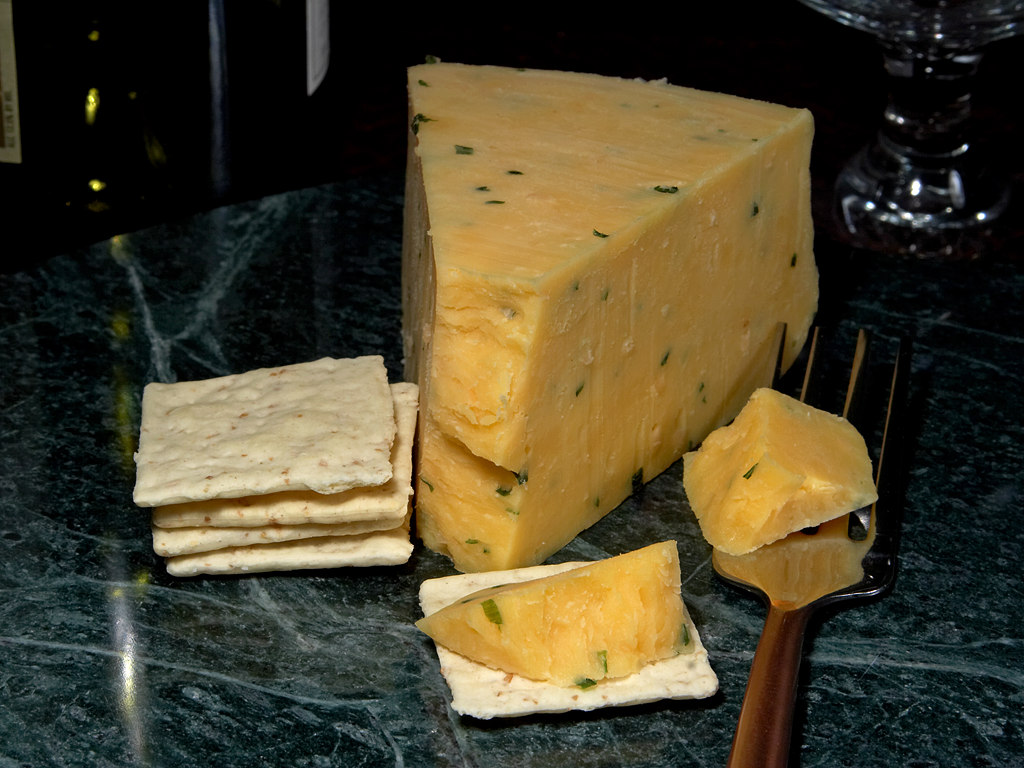
Cotswold cheese, a variety of Double Gloucester blended with chives and spring onions, served with crackers

Dorset is known for the Dorset Knob, a hard savoury biscuit said to be a favourite of author Thomas Hardy, which is eaten softened by soaking them in sweet tea. Knobs are often eaten with Dorset Blue Vinney, a hard, crumbly blue cheese. Somerset is best known as the home of cheddar cheese, traditionally produced in the caves at Cheddar Gorge near the village of Cheddar. Cheddar traditionally had to be made within 30 mi (48 km) of Wells Cathedral. Somerset is known for its range of ciders, with brands such as Thatchers and Brothers. The city of Bath is known for its eponymous buns, sweet rolls made from milk-based yeast dough, and Olivers, a hard, dry cracker often eaten with cheese.

Gloucestershire is known for its variety of cheeses. Gloucester, a semi-hard cheese made since the 16th century, is produced in two varieties: Single and Double. Double Gloucester is more widely sold, and is known for its distinctive yellow colour. Double Gloucester is used as a prize for the Cooper's Hill Cheese-Rolling and Wake, an annual event in which competitors chase a wheel of cheese down a steep Gloucestershire hillside. Stinking Bishop, a handmade semi-soft creamy cheese is made in Dymock by rind-washing the cheese in perry made from the local Stinking Bishop pear. Wiltshire is known for the Wiltshire cure, a traditional technique for curing bacon and ham in a brine of salt, sugar, and spices, developed by the Harris family in the 18th century and has since become popular across Britain.

As a major city, Bristol developed a unique culinary scene distinct in the West Country. As of August 2026, the Michelin Guide recognised 38 restaurants in the city, with five having Michelin stars, four of which specialise in modern British cuisine. Bristol hosts Za Za Bazaar, Britain's largest restaurant. In 2019, Bristol was voted the top culinary destination in the world, and the world's most accommodating city for vegan cuisine the following year. Bristol has developed some of its own unique culinary staples, such as Harveys Bristol Cream sherry founded in 1796; Clark's Pie, made with beef, ox kidneys, potatoes, onions, and gravy, encased in thick pastry; and Mothering Buns, enriched bread buns dusted with white sugar icing and strewn with hundreds-and-thousands.

==== South East ====
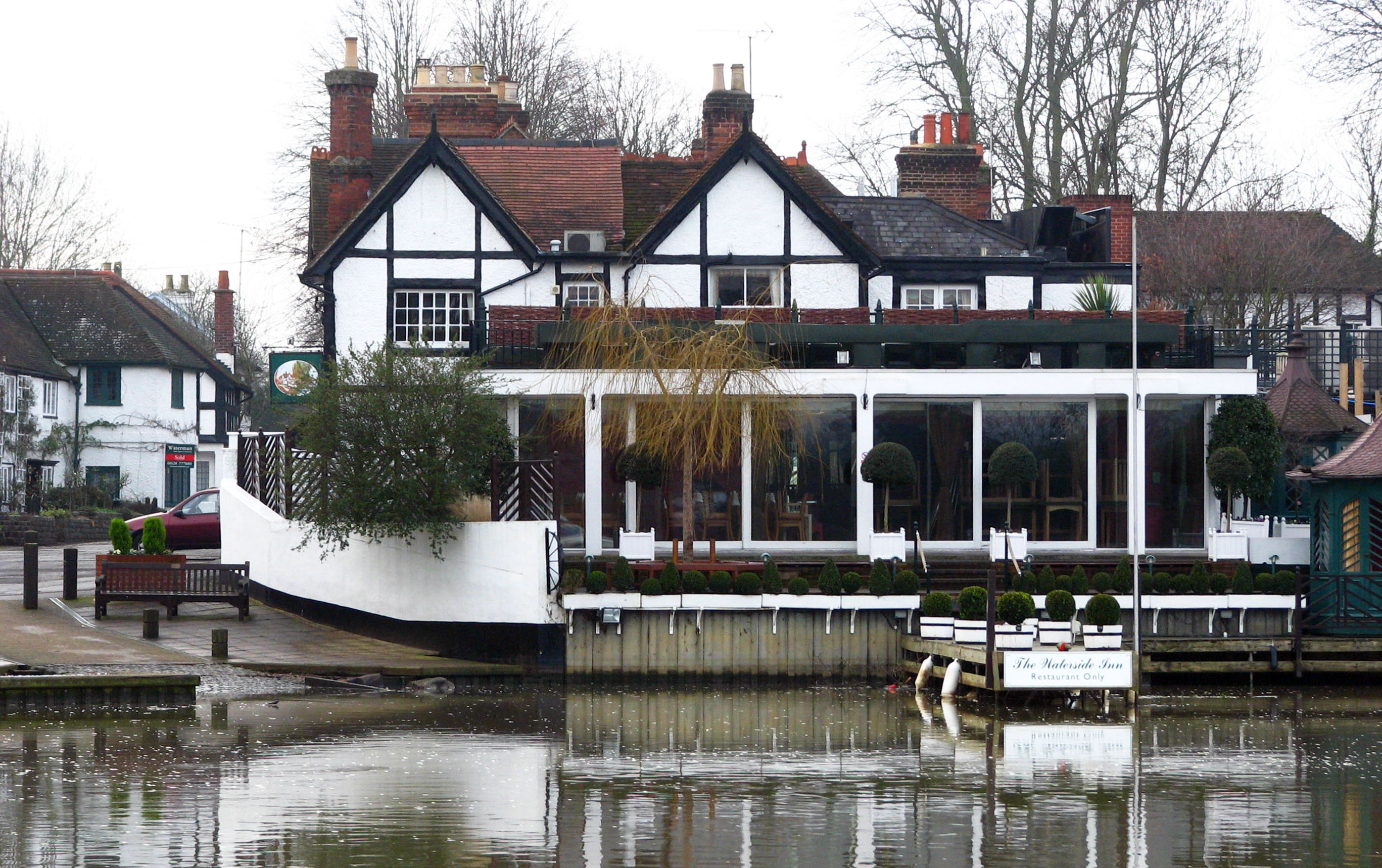
The Waterside Inn, which became the first restaurant outside of France to retain three Michelin stars for more than 25 years.

South East England officially comprises nine counties, (Note: Comprises Berkshire, Buckinghamshire, East Sussex, Hampshire, the Isle of Wight, Kent, Oxfordshire, Surrey, and West Sussex) separate from London.

Berkshire is a significant producer of cheese, including Waterloo, a semi-soft cheese similar to brie, made from unpasteurised Guernsey milk; Barkham Blue cheese; and Wigmore, a white rinded semi-soft ewe's milk cheese. Eton College is the home of Eton mess, a traditional dessert of smashed meringue, fresh strawberries, and whipped cream, and is regarded as a quintessential English dish, often served at the annual cricket match between Eton and its rival school, Harrow. Windsor pudding is another dessert traditional to the county, made from breadcrumbs and suet with dried fruit, chopped apple, lemon, and nutmeg, before being steamed. Berkshire boasts two of Britain's ten three-Michelin starred restaurants: The Waterside Inn and The Fat Duck, both in Bray. Heston Blumenthal at The Fat Duck invented triple-cooked chips, in which chips are first simmered and cooled, before being deep fried twice to achieve a glassy crust and a fluffy interior, and has been credited with triggering a renaissance in how chips are cooked in British restaurants.

Pies are a staple of Buckinghamshire's regional foods and includes unique dishes such as Bacon Badger, a filling of bacon, potatoes, onions, and beef suet seasoned with fresh sage wrapped in pastry, while a variation of this, the Buckinghamshire Dumpling, substitutes pigs' liver for the beef suet and does not contain potatoes. The county has a rich heritage of growing cherries which led to the creation of the Cherry Duff, a steamed pie of black cherries similar to a turnover. "Duff" refers to a thick, flour-and-butter batter that is steamed over the fruit. Several traditional pies also draw from continental influences using pasta as fillings, such as Buckinghamshire rabbit pie, consisting of rabbit, cheese, macaroni, and cream in a double puff pastry. Stokenchurch pie evolved as a practical way to use up leftover meats such as rabbit, beef, or lamb, mixed with macaroni, hard-boiled eggs, and beef stock wrapped in a double shortcrust pastry.

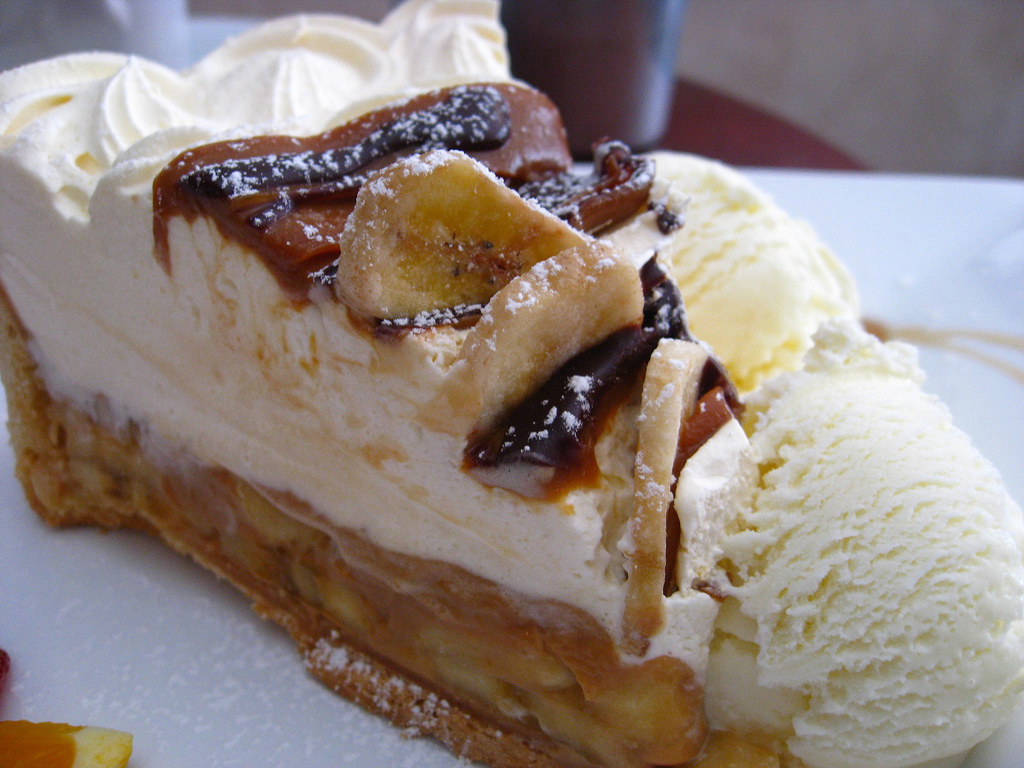
A slice of banoffee pie

East and West Sussex, (Note: East Sussex and West Sussex are administrative divisions, while Sussex is the traditional, historic county. For the purposes of this article, only 'Sussex' will be used to encompass both) with their long and plentiful coastlines led to seafoods such as eel, cockles, lobster, herring, mullet, and trout becoming identified with the county, reflected in the poem "The Seven Good Things of Sussex". Additionally, seafood such as crab, haddock, and scallops are widely eaten. A well-known local dish is a Sussex Smokie, combining smoked haddock poached in milk, which is then combined with a roux, cream, cheese, spices, and topped with breadcrumbs before being grilled. A traditional Sussex dessert is its eponymous pond pudding, consisting of suet pastry filled with butter, sugar, and a whole lemon, which is then steamed for several hours; the long cooking time creates a thick, caramelised sauce, while the lemon skin candies, akin to marmalade. Banoffee pie, now popular all over the world, originates from Sussex, made from bananas, whipped cream, and a thick caramel sauce made from condensed milk or dulce de leche, set onto a pastry base or one made of crumbled biscuits and butter.

Sussex produces a wide variety of cheeses, with the High Weald Dairy producing 15 distinct varieties alone. Local varieties include Lord of the Hundreds, an unpasteurised sheep's milk hard cheese similar to Italian Parmesan; Sussex Charmer, a creamy hard cheese akin to cheddar; a local version of brie; Seven Sisters, a pasteurised sheep's milk cheese with a seaweed coating; and Blue Cloud, a mild cow's milk cheese in the style of Gorgonzola. Wine has been produced in Sussex for some two millennia and today accounts for over a quarter of the UK's wine production. Sussex wine is of particular renown; it enjoys PDO status in the EU. With 138 vineyards, Sussex is one of the UK's top wine producing counties, and its sparkling wine has been rated as some of the world's finest, rivalling French Champagne.

With 64 miles of coastline, the Isle of Wight's cuisine has strong roots in seafood, with bass, mackerel, garfish, plaice, rays, smooth-hounds, flounder, mullet, bream, and cod commonly caught in its waters. Crab meat is made into a local pasty, made of shortcrust or puff pastry. French troops stationed on the island during World War II found garlic grew exceptionally well in the soil there, and led to garlic becoming a staple with unique dishes such as garlic ice cream, ketchup, and beer being produced. The Isle of Wight Cheese Company produces a variety of local cheeses, including Borthwood, a soft mould-rinded cheese layered with truffle; Isle of Wight Soft, a pasteurised cheese similar to brie and camembert; a soft cow's milk blue cheese; and Gallybagger, a hard cheddar-like cheese pressed into Gouda moulds and aged on local cypress wood. Gallybagger is used to make a local cheese soufflé, served with white onion purée. The island's temperate climate allows for the growing of a large variety of tomatoes; asparagus, which is often served on toasted bread with a soft poached egg; rock samphire; and is a major producer of new potatoes.

Hampshire is abundant in chalk streams, providing the ideal environment for large amounts of watercress. Watercress features widely in many local dishes, such as watercress and walnut tart, and is used to add a peppery note to pork sausages. The Itchen and Test rivers are rich in wild trout, and are commonly caught through fly fishing. Hampshire is notable for the New Forest, one of the largest unenclosed pastures in Southern England, which still recognises the ancient pasture rights of New Forest Commoners. Wild boar are reared for meat in the Forest, while free-range pigs graze on acorns, apples, and beech mast, producing bacon and ham of noted quality. Local pork is used to create Hampshire Haslet. Sheep have been reared in Hampshire since the middle ages and developed into unique breeds such as the Hampshire Down, with trading fairs in major towns and cities.

Like neighbouring Sussex, Hampshire is a major wine producer, accounting for some 14% of UK sparkling wine output, many of which have become internationally recognised for their quality. Strawberries have been harvested in the Hamble Valley for over 150 years, lending it the nickname of the "Strawberry Coast". Hamble Valley strawberries became particularly popular in London in the 19th century. Hampshire produces several varieties of local cheese, such as Winslade, a mild soft cheese similar to Vacherin; Tunworth, a soft white-rinded cheese billed as "British Camembert"; and garlic & nettle cheese, produced by the Lyburn Farmhouse.

Kent's rich and arable farmland, fruit orchards abundant in apples, pears, cherries, and berries, as well as large hops gardens has led it to be nicknamed the "Garden of England". With its chalky soil comparable to northern France, Kent is one of the UK's top wine producing counties, accounting for approximately 25% of all vineyard planting in Britain producing over 5 million bottles annually. Kent is home to England's largest vineyard by volume at Chapel Down, with over 950 acres.

=== Northern Irish ===
Northern Ireland's culinary heritage has its roots in the staple diet of generations of farming families—bread and potatoes. Historically, limited availability of ingredients and low levels of immigration resulted in restricted variety and relative isolation from wider international culinary influences. The 21st century has seen significant changes in local cuisine, characterised by an increase in the variety, quantity and quality of gastropubs and restaurants. There are currently three Michelin-starred restaurants in Northern Ireland, all of which specialise in traditional dishes made using local ingredients.

=== Scottish ===
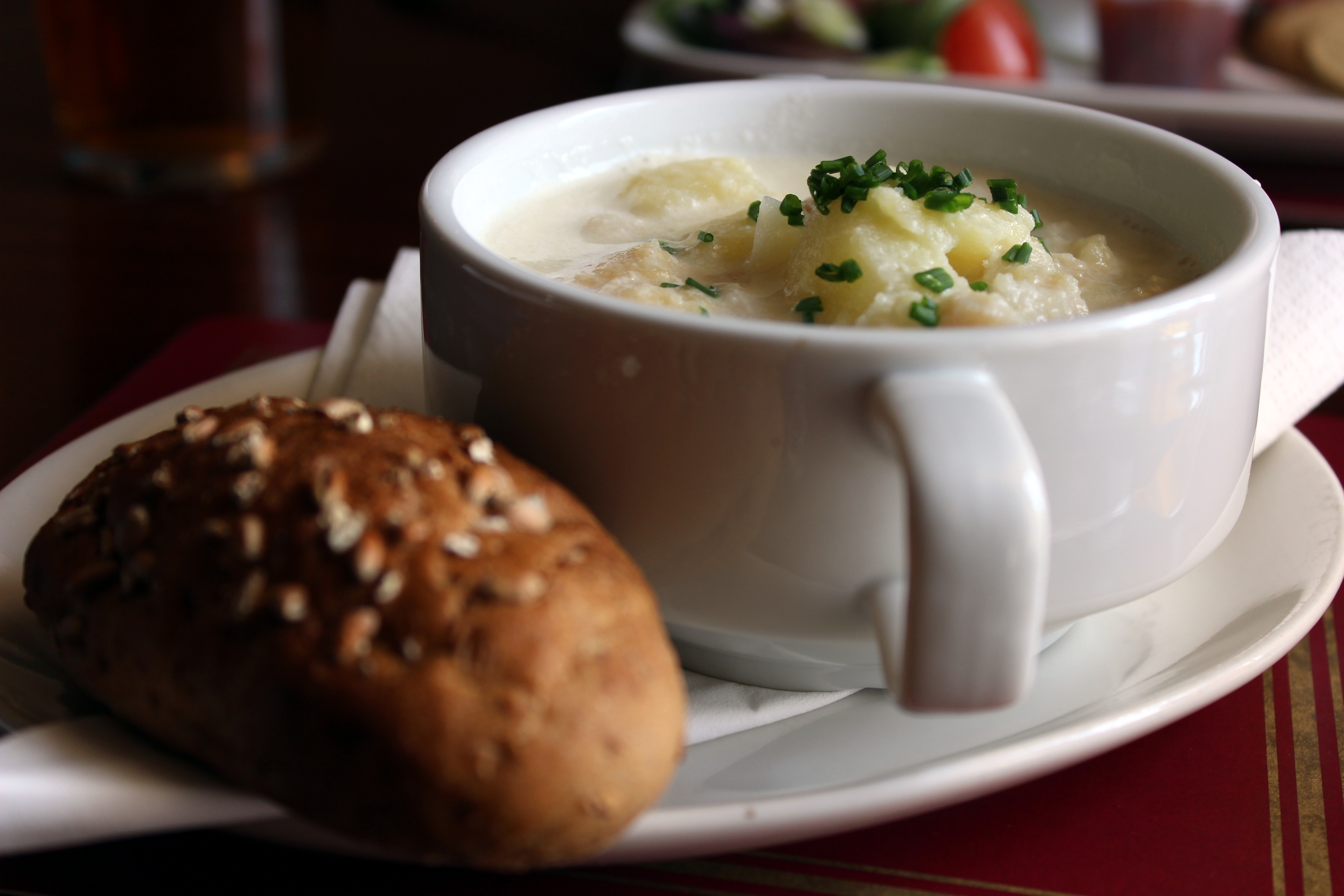
Cullen skink

Scottish cuisine has closer links to Scandinavia and France than English cuisine has. Traditional Scottish dishes include bannocks, brose, cullen skink, Dundee cake, haggis, marmalade, porridge, and Scotch broth. The cuisines of the northern islands of Orkney and Shetland are distinctively different from that of mainland Scotland. The nation is known for its whiskies.

=== Welsh ===
Welsh cuisine in the Middle Ages was limited in range; Gerald of Wales, chaplain to Henry II, wrote after an 1188 tour that "The whole population lives almost entirely on oats and the produce of their herds, milk, cheese and butter. You must not expect a variety of dishes from a Welsh kitchen, and there are no highly-seasoned titbits to whet your appetite."

In modern times, the cuisine includes recipes for Welsh lamb, and dishes such as cawl, Welsh rarebit, laverbread, Welsh cakes, bara brith and Glamorgan sausage.

Example dishes of the four nations

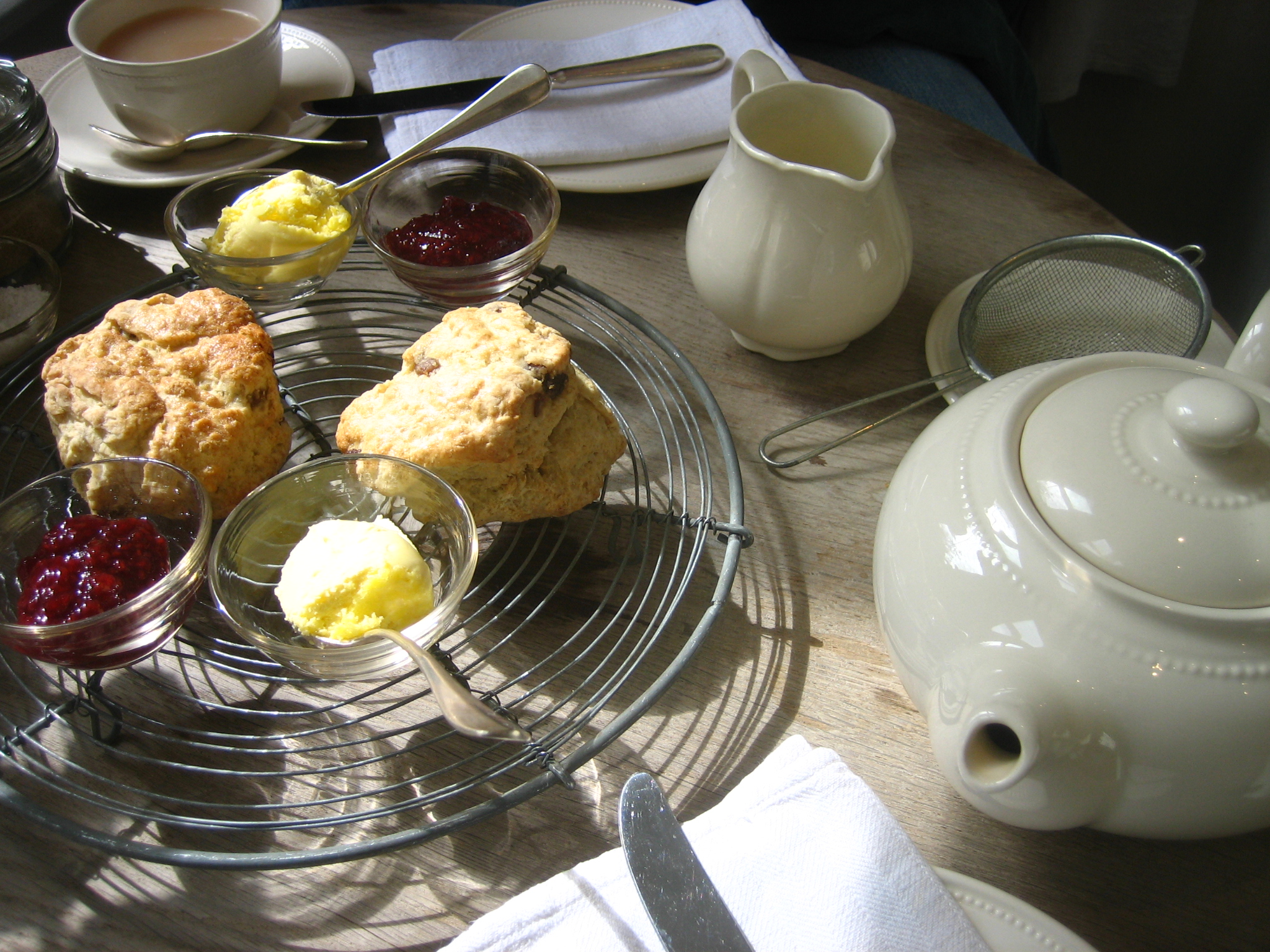
English tea with scones

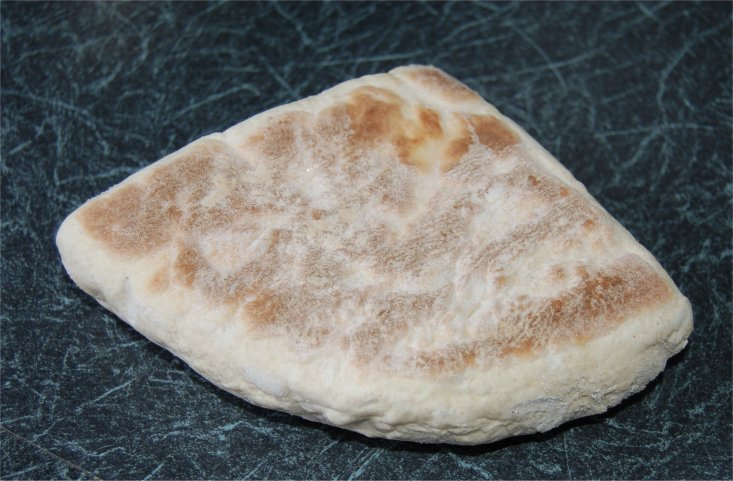
Northern Irish soda bread farl

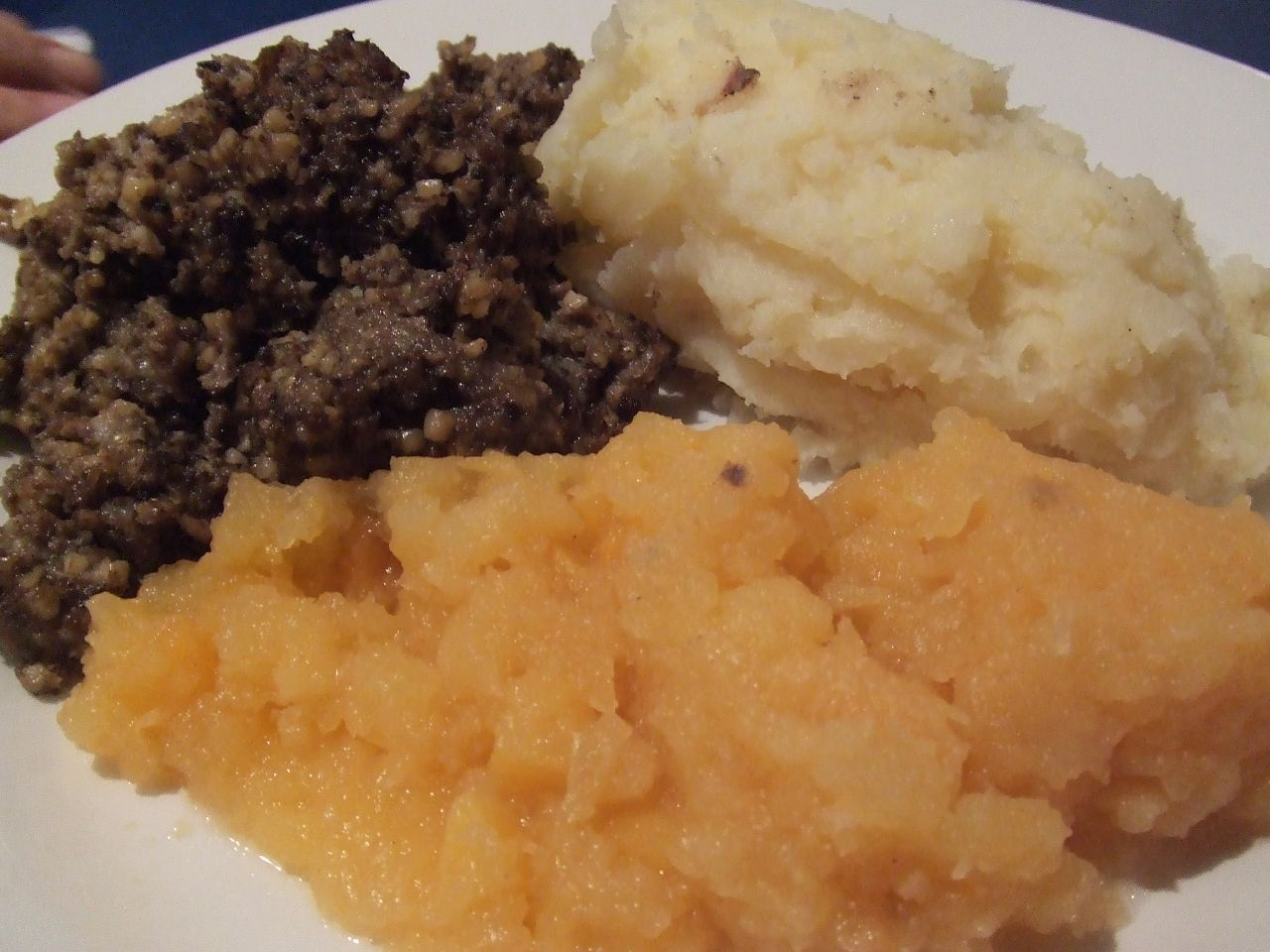
Scottish haggis, neeps and tatties

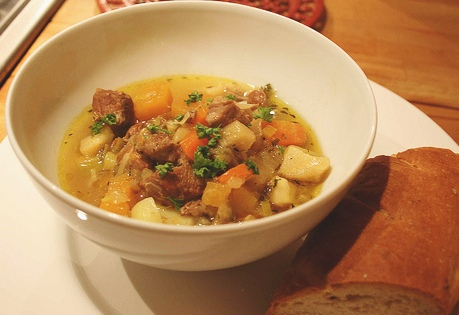
Welsh cawl

== Popular dishes ==
According to a 2026 survey by YouGov of British dishes the number one most popular dish was roast chicken, with 88% of those surveyed having a positive opinion on the dish.

== See also ==
- Channel Islands cuisine
- Cuisine of the Thirteen Colonies
- Culture of the United Kingdom
- List of British breads
- List of British desserts
- List of United Kingdom food and drink products with protected status
- List of English dishes

== Sources ==
- Blue, Anthony Dias (2004). The Complete Book of Spirits: A Guide to Their History, Production, and Enjoyment. HarperCollins. ISBN 978-0-06-054218-4.
- Crosby, Alfred W. (December 2001). "The Columbian Exchange: Plants, Animals, and Disease between the Old and New Worlds". National Humanities Center.
- Davidson, Alan (2014) [1999]. The Oxford Companion to Food (Third ed.). Oxford: Oxford University Press. ISBN 978-0-19967-733-7.
- Dickson Wright, Clarissa (2011). A History of English Food. Random House. ISBN 978-1-905-21185-2.
- Home Front Handbook. Imperial War Museum (Ministry of Information). 2005 [1945]. ISBN 1-904897-11-8.
- John, J (2005), A Christmas Compendium, Continuum International Publishing Group, ISBN 0-8264-8749-1
- Lehmann, Gilly (2003). The British Housewife. Prospect Books.
- Panayi, Panikos (2010) [2008]. Spicing Up Britain. Reaktion Books. ISBN 978-1-86189-658-2.
- Pendergrast, Mark (2001). Uncommon Grounds: The History of Coffee and How It Transformed Our World. London: Texere. ISBN 978-1-58799-088-5. OCLC 48931999.
- Plunkett, John, ed. (2012). Victorian Literature: A Sourcebook. Houndmills, Basingstoke: Palgrave Macmillan. ISBN 9780230551756.
- Timbs, John (1866), Something for Everybody (and a Garland for the Year), London: Lockwood and Co.
