= Beech mast =

Beech mast may refer to:

- the fruit of the beech tree
- a heavier crop of seeds every four to six years or so from Nothofagus, the southern beech

== See also ==
- Mast seeding
