= Wiltshire cure =

Food preservation technique

The Wiltshire cure is a traditional English technique for curing bacon and ham. The technique originated in the 18th century in Calne, Wiltshire; it was developed there by the Harris family. Originally it was a dry cure method that involved applying salt to the meat for 10–14 days. Storing the meat in cold rooms meant that less salt was needed. Since the First World War it has been a wet cure, where the meat is soaked in brine for 4–5 days. Smoking is not part of the process, although bacon is often smoked after being cured.

In 2025, an application by the British Meat Processors Association to register Wiltshire Cured Ham (together with the alternative names Wiltshire Cured Bacon and Wiltshire Cured Gammon) as a traditional speciality guaranteed was unsuccessful.

== Sources ==
- Davidson, Alan; Jaine, Tom (2006), The Oxford Companion to Food, Oxford University Press, ISBN 0-19-280681-5
- Piggott, Stuart; Thirsk, Joan (2011), The Agrarian History of England and Wales: Volume 1, Prehistory to AD 1042, Cambridge University Press, ISBN 978-1-107-40114-3
