= Haslet =

British pork product

Haslet or "acelet" is a pork meatloaf with herbs, originally from Lincolnshire. The British English word is derived from the Old French hastilles meaning entrails. In Lincolnshire, haslet (pronounced '/ˈhæslɪt/' locally) is typically made from stale white bread, minced pork, sage, salt and black pepper. It is of a fine, dense texture and can be thinly sliced, typically served cold with pickles and salad, or as a sandwich filling. In England, it is sold primarily by butchers and in markets and occasionally sold on a delicatessen counter. It is often made in-house by traditional butchers as a way of utilising scraps, minimising waste and increasing profits. As such, recipes may be personalised and with regional variation.

Welsh haslet is traditionally made from finely minced potatoes, pigs' liver and onions.

In North American English, "haslet" refers to the "edible viscera of a butchered animal".
