= Aktar Islam =

British Michelin-starred chef, restaurateur, and entrepreneur (b.1980)

- Born: Aktar Islam; 1980 (age 45–46); Birmingham, West Midlands, England
- Spouse: Mishke Fredericks
- Culinary career
- Cooking style: Modern British cuisine Indian cuisine Italian cuisine Argentinian cuisine
- Rating
- Michelin stars
- Current restaurant
- Opheem Oudh 1722
- Previous restaurants
- Pulperia; Legna
- Television shows
- The F Word, Great British Menu, Market Kitchen, Saturday Kitchen, Masterchef Professionals, Snack Masters
- Website: opheem.com

Aktar Islam (born 1980) is an English Michelin-starred chef, restaurateur, and entrepreneur.

He left the Lasan Group in 2016 to work on his new, flagship project, Opheem, and launched his now-closed Italian restaurant, Legna, in winter 2018. His new group of restaurants concentrates on the celebration of ingredients and is dedicated to gastronomy. Both Opheem and Legna opened to critical acclaim and Opheem received its first Michelin star in October 2019. In February 2024, Opheem received a second Michelin star.

Islam opened another restaurant in March 2020, Pulperia, an Argentine restaurant built around the celebration of beef, and went on to become the only Michelin-listed Steakhouse restaurant in Birmingham before permanently closing in September 2022.

In 2026 Aktar launched his debut London restaurant www.oudh1722.com , a restaurant that celebrates Awadhi culture and cuisine from Lucknow. The restaurant opened to unanimous critical acclaim, has been pitted as Londons hottest opening of 2026.

AI Restaurant Group now is steered by Aktar Islam's focus on product-led cooking whilst creating opportunities for young individuals from Birmingham.

In 2009, Aktar Islam was crowned champion by Gordon Ramsay on Channel 4's The F Word. In June 2011, he won the fish course in the final of the BBC Two series Great British Menu. He returned to the Great British Menu Kitchen as a veteran Judge in 2022.

== Early life ==
Islam was born and brought up in Birmingham, England. His parents are from Bangladesh and came to Britain in the late 1970s. He is the second eldest of five sons.

Islam attended Prince Albert School. At the age of 13, Islam's first job was working at his father's restaurant.

== Career ==
Islam started working in the restaurant industry at the age of 13. His first restaurant project, Karma in Shirley Solihull, was launched when he was 20.

In 2007, he launched his cookbook and DVD named the Spice of Life, in collaboration with Warwick University Medical school.

In 2010, Islam and his sous chef, Aysan Shaikh, beat Curry Corner from Cheltenham on Channel 4's The F Word, after beating Santa Maria (South American cuisine) and Sweet Mandarin (Chinese cuisine) in the semi-final. Aktar Islam then went on to win the overall final, after beating The Pheasant from Keystone.

In June 2011, Islam won the Central regional heat to reach the final of the BBC Two series Great British Menu. He went on to win the fish course in the final. Islam's other television appearances include Market Kitchen, Perfect, Saturday Kitchen and The One Show. He is a regular judge and mentor for MasterChef Professionals and also a veteran judge on Great British Menu. Along with other celebrity chefs, he attends the BBC Good Food Shows, Autumn Fair, Heart of England Fine Foods, Food & Drink Expo, Taste festivals, Grand Design LIVE and Sharon Osbourne's Mrs. Osbourne Presents.

Until 2017 Islam co-owned Indian restaurants Lasan, Lasan Eatery (now known as Raja Monkey), Nosh and Quaff, and Argentinian restaurant Fiesta Del Asado.

Islam has also attended a reception at Buckingham Palace, invited by Queen Elizabeth II and Prince Philip for his contribution to the British hospitality industry. Islam was selected by Marketing Birmingham to represent the city in their Birmingham Bites campaign.

He left the Lasan Group in 2017 to work on his new, flagship project, Opheem which opened in May 2018.

Legna was launched in the winter of 2018. It closed permanently in 2020.

He launched Pulperia in Brindley Place Birmingham in March 2020 and was due to launch another restaurant in Edgbaston, Birmingham in 2021. Pulperia closed permanently in September 2022.

Aktar at Home was launched in the spring of 2020 as a response to the national lockdown. This service has been praised by the Michelin-starred chef community and has garnered support and praise from the national press and the general public.

== Awards ==
In 2010, Aktar won 'Best Local Restaurant' on Gordon Ramsay's The F Word.

In 2011, Aktar came first in the BBC TV series Great British Menu.

In May 2012, Aktar was named Birmingham Young Professional of the Year.

In October 2019, Aktar Islam became the first British-born Bangladeshi chef to be awarded a Michelin star and Opheem became the only Michelin-starred Indian restaurant in the UK outside of London. In February 2024, Opheem won a second Michelin star, making it only one of two Indian restaurants in the UK to hold two Michelin stars, the other being Gymkhana in London, and the first restaurant in Birmingham to hold two Michelin stars. It continues to be the only Michelin-starred Indian restaurant outside London. Opheem is also one of only four Indian restaurants in the world with two Michelin stars.

== Personal life ==
Islam lives in Birmingham and has a son Alex (born 2007).

Islam also supports charities including Birmingham Children's Hospital, NHS Organ Donor Campaign, Oxfam and NHS/Warwick University Spice for Life campaign.

Despite his name, he is not a practising Muslim.
