= Handling =

Handling may refer to:

- Automobile handling, the turning characteristics of land vehicles
- Handling of stolen goods, a statutory offence in England and Wales and Northern Ireland
- Handling, one of the processes in freight transport

== People ==
- Adam Handling (born 1988), British chef and restaurateur
- Danny Handling (born 1994), Scottish football player
- Piers Handling (born 1949), Canadian film executive
