= Local Food Hero =

- Starring: Gary Rhodes, Ollie Rowe and Rosemary Shrager
- Original language: English
- No. of series: 3

Original release
- Network: UKTV Food
- Release: 2006

Local Food Hero is a competition to find, celebrate and award Britain's best independent food businesses - those who champions local produce with a strong connection to their community. In 2009, the competition was hosted by the television programme Market Kitchen, on the channel Good Food. Businesses from 10 regions in the UK were nominated and voted for by the public on the Good Food Channel website. After voting ended, the 10 businesses from each region with the most votes were assessed by a selection panel. The panel shortlisted three businesses from each region.

Presenters Matt Tebbutt and Matthew Fort visited the shortlisted businesses for a feature on Market Kitchen. A panel of expert judges then chose one winner from each the 10 regions, all of whom appeared as guests on Market Kitchen. The overall national winner for 2009 was The Dinner Ladies who received a trophy and £5000.

In previous years, celebrity chefs Gary Rhodes, Ollie Rowe and Rosemary Shrager presented and judged the competition as a stand-alone show.

== Changes ==
The first season would have a celebrity "regional scout" visit eight businesses in their locality, who they would talk to and sample their produce. The scout would then choose their favourite three who would then go on to the regional finals, where the three chefs and judges would pick their first second and third placed contestant, the winner of the regional heat would then be chosen by combining the judge's and public votes.

The second season saw a slight change where five finalists are chosen to go on the regional finals.

== Series 1 (2006) ==
=== Regional finalists and winner ===
The following are the three regional finalists for 2006:

==== East Anglia ====
East Anglia's regional scout was Danny Boome.

- The Letheringsett Watermill (regional winner)
- Samphire
- Rainbow Café
- Byfords Café & Deli
- DJ Barnard Meats
- Alder Carr Farm
- The Galley Restaurant
- The Lavender House

==== London ====
London's regional scout was celebrity chef, Aldo Zilli

- Lighthouse Bakery (regional winner)
- Kelly's Organic Foods
- Crumpet
- The Easton
- Hope & Greenwood
- The Ginger Pig
- Duke of Cambridge
- Mortimer and Bennett

==== Midlands ====
The regional scout for the Midlands was Terri Dwyer.

- The Pink Pig (regional winner)
- The Fighting Cocks
- Deli on the Square
- Maison Mayci
- The Wellington
- Berrys Coffee House
- Littleover Apiaries
- The Handmade Scotch Egg Company

==== North East ====
The regional scout for the North East was Brian Turner.

- Northumbrian Quality Meats (regional winner)
- Ryebury of Helmsley
- The Whitby Catch
- Helmsley Walled Garden
- Langthorne's Buffalo Produce
- Carroll's Heritage Potatoes
- The Comfort Food Company
- Greens of Whitby

==== North West ====
Edwina Currie stepped up as regional scout for the North West.

- The Café @ Green Pavilion (regional winner)
- The Weavers Shed Restaurant
- Mrs Kirkhams Lancashire Cheese
- The Grasmere Ginger Bread Shop
- The Whale Tail Café
- Artisan Café
- The Real Lancashire Black Pudding Company
- Holly Tree Farm Shop

==== Northern Ireland ====
Paul Rankin was the regional scout for the Northern Ireland area.

- Yellow Door Deli (regional winner)
- O’Doherty Butchers
- Helen Bay Organics
- The Bay Tree
- The Duke Restaurant
- Cloughbane Farm
- Tully Meadows Luxury Jersey Ice Cream
- Pretty Mary's

==== Scotland ====
The scout for Scotland was Kaye Adams.

- Original Smokies from Arbroath (regional winner)
- Ferry Fish
- Heart Buchanon Café
- The Store
- Farm House Kitchen
- The Water Tower
- McPhies Bakery
- Fletcher Fine Foods

==== South East ====
Sarah Cawood scouted the South East region.

- The Crooked Billet (regional winner)
- Farm Fresh Express Limited
- Dairy Barn Farm Shop
- The Vaults And Garden Café
- The Royal Standard
- Spice Merchant
- The Real Jam and Chutney Co.
- Hammer Trout Farm and Smokery

==== South West ====
Michael Caines chose the eight finalists from the South West.

- Roswell Fruit and Veg
- Country Cheeses
- Montgomery Cheese
- Combe House Hotel and Restaurant
- The Dartmoor Inn
- Jekka's Herb Farm
- Riverford Organic Vegetables Limited
- Quartier Vert

==== Wales ====
The scout for the Wales region was Angela Gray.

- Organic Zone (regional winner)
- Pilgrim's Tea Rooms
- The Harbour Master
- The Treehouse
- Castell Deudraeth Bar and Grill
- The Barn at Brynich
- Xtreme Organix
- Frantastic Crepes

==== Overall Winner ====
The overall winner for Local Food Hero 2006 was the Letheringsett Watermill

== Series 2 (2007) ==
The overall winner for Local Food Hero 2007 was the Daisy's Farm Fresh Milk

== Series 3 (2008) ==
The overall winner Local Food Hero 2008 was Richard Ord from Colman's Fish and Chip Shop in South Shields.

== Market Kitchen (2009) ==
The overall winner Local Food Hero 2009 was The Dinner Ladies, school caterers from Wilmslow in Cheshire.
