= Great British Menu =

British cooking television series

- Opening title used in series 1–4
- Also known as: Great British Christmas Menu; Great British Waste Menu; Great British Budget Menu
- Genre: Cooking competition
- Presented by: Jennie Bond; Susan Calman; Andi Oliver
- Judges: Matthew Fort; Oliver Peyton; Prue Leith; Andi Oliver; Rachel Khoo; Tom Kerridge; Nisha Katona; Ed Gamble; Lorna McNee; Phil Wang
- Voices of: Jennie Bond; Mark Bazeley; Wendy Lloyd; Andi Oliver
- Theme music composer: Daniel Pemberton
- Country of origin: United Kingdom
- Original language: English
- No. of series: 21
- No. of episodes: 756

Production
- Running time: 30–60 minutes
- Production company: Optomen

Original release
- Network: BBC Two; BBC One (Specials)
- Release: 10 April 2006 – present

Great British Menu is a BBC television series in which top British chefs compete for the chance to cook one course of a four-course banquet.

== Format ==
Series one and two were presented by Jennie Bond, the former BBC Royal correspondent, whereby each week, two chefs from a region of the UK create a menu. In series three and four, both narrated by Bond but with no presenter, three chefs from a region of the UK create a menu; only the two with the best scores went through to the Friday judging. In series five and six, the fifth narrated by Bond while the sixth is narrated by Wendy Lloyd, three chefs from a region of the UK create a menu, with in kitchen judging undertaken by a past contestant chef; only the two with the best scores go through to the Friday judging.

In each series, the Friday show is when chefs present all courses of their menu to a judging panel, tasted and judged by Matthew Fort, Prue Leith, and Oliver Peyton. One chef each week goes through to the final, where the judges taste the dishes again and award them marks out of ten.

In series one and two, the three dishes that have scored the highest for each course of the finals are then shortlisted for public vote via televoting. In series three and four, the shortlisting rule was dropped, so all dishes scored by the judges are then sent to the public vote. Judges' scores represent one half of the overall score, and public vote represents the other half. The Guardian critic Karina Mantavia in May 2007 criticised the public vote system as incompatible to food that viewers could see onscreen but not taste in-person.

Starting from series five, a fourth judge, usually either a veteran chef or a guest related to a brief, is introduced, replacing public vote. Since series eight, the fourth judge addition extends to regional heats.

Up until series six, the finalists can replace only one course dish of their own menus with a newer one. They can adjust or tweak other dishes but cannot completely change them.

On 28 October 2016, it was confirmed that Prue Leith was leaving the show and would be replaced by Andi Oliver for series 12 in 2017.

On 1 October 2019, Susan Calman was announced as the new presenter for series 15. Filming took place in Stratford-upon-Avon and was completed in November 2019. The show was broadcast in spring 2020. For Christmas 2020 special series and thereafter, Andi Oliver stepped down as a judge and has replaced Calman as the presenter.

On 7 February 2021, it was announced that Rachel Khoo would be joining as a new judge when the series returns in spring 2021.

On 6 September 2021, it was announced that the whole judging panel would be changed with Matthew Fort and Oliver Payton leaving after being on the show since the beginning and Rachel Khoo after one series. The new judging panel will consist of former GBM champion Tom Kerridge, chef and restaurateur Nisha Katona, and comedian and food podcaster Ed Gamble.

On 8 November 2024, Lorna McNee was announced as a new judge when the series returns in January 2025; replacing Nisha Katona who left after series 19 ended.

On 11 December 2025, it was announced comedian Phil Wang will be joining the judging panel taking over from Ed Gamble who decided to step down at the end of series 20.

== Series overview ==
Series overview (series 1–12)
Series	Episodes	Originally released		Starter	Fish	Main	Dessert
Series	Episodes	First released	Last released	Starter	Fish	Main	Dessert
1	41	10 April 2006	16 June 2006	Richard Corrigan	Bryn Williams	Nick Nairn	Marcus Wareing
2	41	2 April 2007	8 June 2007	Sat Bains	Richard Corrigan	Mark Hix	Mark Hix
3	49	17 March 2008	13 June 2008	Jason Atherton	Stephen Terry	Jason Atherton	Glynn Purnell
4	46	30 March 2009	16 June 2009	Kenny Atkinson	Glynn Purnell	Nigel Haworth	Shaun Rankin
5	45	6 April 2010	4 June 2010	Lisa Allen	Kenny Atkinson	Tom Kerridge	Niall McKenna
6	45	4 April 2011	3 June 2011	Chris Fearon	Aktar Islam	Tom Kerridge	Paul Ainsworth
7	45	9 April 2012	8 June 2012	Colin McGurran	Phil Howard	Daniel Clifford	Simon Rogan
8	45	28 January 2013	29 March 2013	Tom Aikens	Aiden Byrne	Michael Smith	Richard Davies Daniel Clifford
9	45	7 April 2014	6 June 2014	Adam Simmonds	Emily Watkins	James Durrant	Colin McGurran
10	45	3 August 2015	9 October 2015	Richard Bainbridge	Michael O'Hare	Matt Gillan	Richard Bainbridge
11	45	29 August 2016	28 October 2016	Mark Abbott	Tommy Banks	Mark Froydenlund	Adam Reid
12	45	2 May 2017	30 June 2017	Pip Lacey	Tommy Banks	Michael Bremner	Selin Kiazim

Great British Christmas Menu (2006)
Series	Episodes	Originally released		1st	2nd (tie)	2nd (tie)	4th
Series	Episodes	First released	Last released	1st	2nd (tie)	2nd (tie)	4th
GBCM	5	11 December 2006	15 December 2006	Richard Corrigan	Nick Nairn	Marcus Wareing	Bryn Williams

Great British Waste Menu (2010)
Series	Episodes	Originally released	Canapé	Starter	Main	Dessert	Dustbin Award
GBWM	1	25 August 2010	Simon Rimmer	Matt Tebutt	Richard Corrigan	Angela Hartnett	Richard Corrigan

Great British Budget Menu (2013)
Series	Episodes	Originally released	Contenders
GBBM	1	11 July 2013	James Martin, Angela Hartnett, and Richard Corrigan

Series overview (series 13–present)
Series	Episodes	Originally released		Starter	Fish	Main	Dessert	Mini course(s) (Note: Chefs serving mini courses were ineligible for the Champion of Champions award.)	Champion of Champions
Series	Episodes	First released	Last released	Starter	Fish	Main	Dessert	Mini course(s)	Champion of Champions
13	45	13 August 2018	12 October 2018	James Cochran	Ellis Barrie	Tom Brown	Chris Harrod	—N/a	James Cochran
14	29	20 March 2019	17 May 2019	Luke Selby	Tom Anglesea	Adam Reid	Lorna McNee	—N/a	Lorna McNee
15	29	18 March 2020	15 May 2020	Alex Greene	Niall Keating	Tom Barnes	Alex Greene	Amuse-bouche: Ruth Hansom Pre-dessert: Kerth Gumbs	Niall Keating
GBCM	7	1 December 2020	24 December 2020	Alex Greene	Tom Barnes	Lisa Goodwin-Allen	Lisa Goodwin-Allen	Canapé: James Cochran, Alex Greene, and Lisa Goodwin-Allen Petit four: Tommy Banks	—N/a
16	29	24 March 2021	21 May 2021	Alex Bond	Roberta Hall-McCarron	Oli Marlow	Dan McGeorge	Palate cleanser and Petit four: Jude Kereama	Dan McGeorge
17	29	1 February 2022	1 April 2022	Nathan Davies	Spencer Metzger	Spencer Metzger	Chris McClurg	Canapé and Pre-dessert: Sally Abé	Spencer Metzger
18	29	31 January 2023	31 March 2023	Avi Shashidhara	Nick Beardshaw	Tom Shepherd	Adam Handling	Canapé and Cheese: Will Lockwood	Adam Handling
19	29	23 January 2024	22 March 2024	Ben Palmer	Adam Smith	Kate Austen	Kirk Haworth	Canapé: Corrin Harrison	Kirk Haworth
20	29	28 January 2025	28 March 2025	Sally Abé	Jean Delport	Jean Delport	Amber Francis	Canapé: Mark McCabe	Amber Francis
21	29	24 February 2026	24 April 2026	Orry Shand	~~Corrin Harrison~~; Nikita Pathakji	Cal Byerley	Ciaran Brennan	Canapé: ~~Nikita Pathakji~~ Each participating chef	Nikita Pathakji

== Series 1 (2006) ==
The birthday meal for the Queen was on 16 June 2006 and for 300 people, so each dish created had to be suitable for a summer banquet. All recipes have been published in a book by Dorling Kindersley.

=== Heats ===
Region	Contestant	Restaurant/Eatery (at time of competition)				Result	Ref
Region	Contestant	Name	Location	Michelin	Role	Result	Ref
South West	Michael Caines	Gidleigh Park	Devon	—N/a	Chef	Won heat	
South West	Michael Caines	Royal Clarence Hotel	Exeter	—N/a	Chef	Won heat	
South West	John Burton Race	New Angel	Dartmouth, Devon	1 Michelin star	Chef-proprietor	Lost heat	
Midlands and the East	Galton Blackiston	Morston Hall	Norfolk	1 Michelin star	Chef	Won heat	
Midlands and the East	Antony Worrall Thompson	Kew Grill	London	—N/a	Chef-proprietor	Lost heat	
Midlands and the East	Antony Worrall Thompson	Notting Grill	London	—N/a	Chef-proprietor	Lost heat	
North	Marcus Wareing	Pétrus	London	1 Michelin star	Executive chef	Won heat	
North	Marcus Wareing	Savoy Grill	London	—N/a	Chef	Won heat	
North	Simon Rimmer	Greens	Manchester	—N/a	Chef-proprietor	Lost heat	
Northern Ireland	Richard Corrigan	Lindsay House	Soho, London	2 Michelin stars	Chef-proprietor	Won heat	
Northern Ireland	Richard Corrigan	Bentley's Oyster Bar and Grill	London	—N/a	Chef-proprietor	Won heat	
Northern Ireland	Paul Rankin	Cayenne	Belfast	1 Michelin star	Chef	Lost heat	
Scotland	Nick Nairn	—N/a (Note: Nick Nairn owned the Nick Nairn Cook School, located near the Lake of Menteith. He was formerly a chef patron of a Michelin-starred restaurant Braeval Old Mill.)				Won heat	
Scotland	Tom Lewis	Monachyle Mhor hotel	Balquhidder in the Trossachs	—N/a	Head chef	Lost heat	
Wales	Bryn Williams	Orrery	London	—N/a	Sous chef under Terrence Conran	Won heat	
Wales	Angela Hartnett	Petrus Banquette at the Connaught Hotel	London	—N/a	Chef	Lost heat	
South East	Atul Kochhar	Benares	London	1 Michelin star	Chef-proprietor	Won heat	
South East	Gary Rhodes	Rhodes Twenty Four	London	1 Michelin star	Chef	Lost heat	

=== Final week ===
The three dishes that have scored the highest for each course in the finals are then put to the public vote. In the first series, it was decided that a chef could only win one course overall, therefore any chef who won the public vote for a particular course was then eliminated from any subsequent courses they had been shortlisted for. As the results for all four courses were announced on the same day, some chefs were eliminated under this rule.

==== Final result ====
- Starter: Richard Corrigan – Smoked salmon with Irish soda bread, woodland sorrel and cress (recipe)
- Fish: Bryn Williams – Pan-fried turbot with cockles and oxtail (recipe)
- Main: Nick Nairn – Loin of roe venison with rosti, celeriac, cabbage, carrot and game gravy (recipe)
- Dessert: Marcus Wareing – Custard tart with Garibaldi biscuits (recipe)

== Great British Christmas Menu (2006) ==
From 11 to 15 December 2006, a special Christmas series was shown. This involved the four winning chefs creating a four course Christmas dinner that viewers could prepare at home.

Unlike the original series, only one chef was able to be crowned the winner and there was no special prize at stake (i.e. the meal would not be cooked for the Queen). The final result was decided by the judges and a viewers' vote; 30p from calls made in order to vote was donated to Children in Need.

=== Final result ===
- 1st – Richard Corrigan (Northern Ireland)
- 2nd – Marcus Wareing (England), Nick Nairn (Scotland)
- 4th – Bryn Williams (Wales)

== Series 2 (2007) ==
Broadcasting of series 2 started on 2 April 2007. The format was the same as before, with the winning chefs from each region from series one taking on new challengers. The final menu was cooked at the British Embassy in Paris at an Ambassadors' Dinner.

=== Contestants ===
Region	Contestant	Restaurant/Eatery (at time of competition)				First time	Result	Ref
Region	Contestant	Name	Location	Michelin	Role	First time	Result	Ref
Midlands and the East	Sat Bains					Debut	Won heat	
Midlands and the East	Galton Blackiston					S1	Lost heat	
Wales	Bryn Williams					S1	Won heat	
Wales	Matt Tebbutt					Debut	Lost heat	
Scotland	Jeremy Lee					Debut	Won heat	
Scotland	Nick Nairn					S1	Lost heat	
Northern Ireland	Richard Corrigan					S1	Won heat	
Northern Ireland	Noel McMeel					Debut	Lost heat	
South East	Atul Kochhar					S1	Won heat	
South East	Stuart Gillies					Debut	Lost heat	
South West	Mark Hix					Debut	Won heat	
South West	Michael Caines					S1	Lost heat	
North	Mark Broadbent					Debut	Won heat	
North	Marcus Wareing					S1	Lost heat	

=== Final week ===
The rule to eliminate a winning chef of one course from any subsequent courses was dropped, as highlighted by Mark Hix winning both the main course and dessert.

==== Final result ====
- Starter: Sat Bains – Ham, egg and peas (recipe)
- Fish: Richard Corrigan – Whole poached wild salmon and duck egg dressing with wheaten bread and country butter (recipe)
- Main: Mark Hix – Rabbit and crayfish stargazy pie (recipe)
- Dessert: Mark Hix – Perry jelly and summer fruits with elderflower ice cream (recipe)

== Series 3 (2008) ==
Broadcasting of series 3 began on 17 March 2008. The chefs competed for the opportunity to cook a four-course dinner held in June 2008, at the restaurant at the top of the iconic "Gherkin" building in London. The host was the chef Heston Blumenthal and his guests included top chefs from around the world along with gourmets and celebrities who represent a cross section of modern Britain.

The series began with seven special programmes in which Great British Menu judge Matthew Fort travelled around the UK, selecting the two chefs who would go through to represent their region in the competition.

=== Heats ===
Region	Won heat	Runner-up	Eliminated at audition	
Central	Glynn Purnell	Sat Bains	Aaron Patterson	Rupert Rowley
Wales	Stephen Terry	Angela Hartnett	Chris Chown	James Sommerin
North	Nigel Haworth	Anthony Flinn	Mark Broadbent	Michael Wignall
Scotland	Tom Kitchin	Matthew Gray	Michael Smith	Tony Singh
Northern Ireland	Danny Millar	Noel McMeel	Liz Moore	Nick Price
South West	Chris Horridge	Elisha Carter	Richard Guest	Chris Wicks
South East	Jason Atherton	Atul Kochhar	Adebola Adeshina	Jake Watkins

=== Final week ===
Starting from this series, all dishes scored by the judges in the finals are sent to public vote.

Final rankings of series 3 (2005)
Chef	Region	Starter		Fish		Main		Dessert	
Chef	Region	Pre-vote rank	Final rank	Pre-vote rank	Final rank	Pre-vote rank	Final rank	Pre-vote rank	Final rank
Chris Horridge	South West	1st	2nd	7th	Not top 3	3rd	Not top 3	2nd	2nd
Danny Millar	Northern Ireland	4th	Not top 3	5th	Not top 3	5th (tie)	Not top 3	5th	Not top 3
Glynn Purnell	Central	5th	Not top 3	6th	Not top 3	4th	3rd	1st	Won dessert
Jason Atherton	South East	2nd (tie)	Won starter	3rd (tie)	Not top 3	1st	Won main	7th	Not top 3
Nigel Haworth	North	6th	Not top 3	1st (tie)	2nd	5th (tie)	Not top 3	4th	Not top 3
Stephen Terry	Wales	7th	Not top 3	1st (tie)	Won fish	2nd	2nd	3rd	3rd
Tom Kitchin	Scotland	2nd (tie)	3rd	3rd (tie)	3rd	7th	Not top 3	6th	Not top 3

==== Final result ====
- Starter: Jason Atherton – Bacon, lettuce and tomato with croque monsieur (recipe)
- Fish: Stephen Terry – Organic salmon and smoked salmon with crab fritters and cockle 'popcorn' (recipe)
- Main: Jason Atherton – Dexter beef fillet, ox cheek, smoked potato puree and marrow bone (recipe)
- Dessert: Glynn Purnell – Strawberries with tarragon and black pepper honeycomb with burnt English cream surprise (recipe)

== Series 4 (2009) ==
Series 4 began on 30 March 2009 and revolved around cooking a meal for British service personnel (sailors/marines/soldiers/airmen and women) returning from the War in Afghanistan. A chef from a previous series came back in this series to act as a mentor, giving the two chefs from their region guidance and advice. They were in the kitchen and acted as an unofficial fourth judge.

The North region was split this time into two groups: North-East and North-West.

=== Heats ===
Region	Won heat	Runner-up	Mentor
Central	Glynn Purnell	Daniel Clifford	Sat Bains
Scotland	Tom Kitchin	Alan Murchison	Jeremy Lee
North East	Kenny Atkinson	Ian Matfin	Marcus Wareing
Northern Ireland	Danny Millar	Clare Smyth	Richard Corrigan
South West	Shaun Rankin	Nathan Outlaw	Mark Hix
Wales	James Sommerin	Stephen Terry	Bryn Williams
North West	Nigel Haworth	Aiden Byrne	Marcus Wareing
South East	Tristan Welch	Mark Sargeant	Jason Atherton

=== Final week ===
Rankings were based on judges' scores and then public votes.

Final rankings of series 4 (2009)
Chef	Region	Starter		Fish		Main		Dessert	
Chef	Region	Pre-vote rank	Final rank	Pre-vote rank	Final rank	Pre-vote rank	Final rank	Pre-vote rank	Final rank
Danny Millar	Northern Ireland	5th	3rd	4th	Not top 3	3rd	3rd	7th	Not top 3
Glynn Purnell	Central	7th	Not top 3	1st	Won fish	7th	Not top 3	6th	Not top 3
James Sommerin	Wales	1st	2nd	8th	Not top 3	8th	Not top 3	5th	Not top 3
Kenny Atkinson	North East	2nd	Won starter	3rd	3rd	5th	Not top 3	4th	Not top 3
Nigel Haworth	North West	3rd	Not top 3	2nd	2nd	1st	Won main	8th	Not top 3
Shaun Rankin	South West	8th	Not top 3	6th	Not top 3	6th	Not top 3	1st	Won dessert
Tom Kitchin	Scotland	6th	Not top 3	5th	Not top 3	2nd	2nd	3rd	3rd
Tristan Welch	South East	4th	Not top 3	7th	Not top 3	4th	Not top 3	2nd	2nd

==== Final result ====
- Starter: Kenny Atkinson – Salad of Aberdeen Angus beef, carrots, horseradish and Shetland Black potatoes (recipe)
- Fish: Glynn Purnell – Masala spiced monkfish with red lentils, pickled carrots and coconut (recipe)
- Main: Nigel Haworth – Lonk lamb Lancashire hotpot, pickled red cabbage, carrots and leeks (Northcote | Luxury Hotel and Michelin Star Restaurant in Lancashire)
- Dessert: Shaun Rankin – Treacle tart with Jersey clotted cream and raspberry ripple coulis (recipe)

== Series 5 (2010) ==
Series 5 began on 6 April 2010 with a double episode. In this series, the participating chefs were challenged to find food producers they had not previously used, basing their search around a National Trust property in their region, with the aim to source as many of their ingredients as possible from the property itself or the surrounding area. The banquet was for producers of British food and The Prince of Wales was the guest of honour.

=== Heats ===
The format of the heats changed in 2010. Instead of only two chefs being present for all the heats for their region, three chefs competed in the "courses" section of their heats, with two going forward to cook for the judges in the "judging" episode. As in series four, a previous participant returned each week, but with the added responsibility of scoring each chef's four courses. The chef with the lowest score at the end of the "courses" episodes was eliminated, and the remaining two cooked for the judges.

Region	Won heat	Runner-up	Eliminated	Judge/mentor
Scotland	Alan Murchison	Michael Smith	Tony Singh	Jeremy Lee
North West	Lisa Allen	Aiden Byrne	Johnnie Mountain	Marcus Wareing
Central	Will Holland	Daniel Clifford	Richard Bainbridge	Glynn Purnell
South West	Nathan Outlaw	John Hooker	Henry Herbert	Michael Caines
Wales	Aled Williams	James Sommerin	Richard Davies	Stephen Terry
North East	Kenny Atkinson	Tim Bilton	Lee Bennett	Nigel Haworth
Northern Ireland	Niall McKenna	Derek Creagh	Brian McCann	Richard Corrigan
London and South East	Tom Kerridge	Anthony Demetre	Tristan Welch	Jason Atherton

=== Final week ===
In the final week running up to the banquet, the chefs cooked one course per day. Starting from this series, a fourth judge was introduced to score the dishes alongside the judges, replacing public vote.

Instead of being ranked from first to eighth place, the top three chefs were all given a possible dish at the banquet, thus allowing the judges to have more choice when choosing the menu at the end of the week.

==== Guest judges ====
- Starter: Richard Corrigan
- Fish: Glynn Purnell
- Main: Jason Atherton
- Dessert: Marcus Wareing

==== Final rankings ====
Final rankings of series 5 (2010)
Chef	Region	Starter	Fish	Main (Note: The top four dishes were selected because two dishes were tied third in scoring.)	Dessert
Alan Murchison	Scotland	6th	7th	8th	Top 3
Aled Williams	Wales	7th	Top 3	Top 4	6th
Kenny Atkinson	North East	Top 3	Chosen fish	7th	8th
Lisa Allen	North West	Chosen starter	4th	Top 4	5th
Nathan Outlaw	South West	4th (tie)	Top 3	Top 4	4th
Niall McKenna	Northern Ireland	4th (tie)	5th	5th	Chosen dessert
Tom Kerridge	London and South East	Top 3	6th	Chosen main	7th
Will Holland	Central	8th	8th	6th	Top 3

==== Final result ====
- Starter: Lisa Allen – Wild rabbit and leek turnover with piccalilli (recipe)
- Fish: Kenny Atkinson – Mackerel with gooseberries (recipe)
- Main: Tom Kerridge – Slow-cooked Aylesbury duck with duck fat chips and gravy (recipe)
- Dessert: Niall McKenna – Poached rhubarb with strawberry jelly, yellow man and lavender ice-cream (recipe)

== Great British Waste Menu (2010) ==
A one-off, 90 minute documentary-style programme was broadcast in December 2010, Great British Waste Menu was made to highlight and discourage food wastage in Britain. In addition to showing several examples of such wastage, the programme challenged four chefs (GBM regulars Richard Corrigan and Angela Hartnett, plus Matt Tebbutt and Simon Rimmer) to create a three-course menu plus canapes from food destined to be discarded by producers, supermarkets, restaurants and regular households. Regular series judges Matthew Fort, Oliver Peyton and Prue Leith and the series's special guest, food critic Jay Rayner, judged the results.

Matt and Simon competed for the starter course; Richard and Angela, for the main course. Simon and Angela, who lost their respective rounds, competed for the dessert course. Simon, who lost the dessert round, served his own canapé course. The final menu, served as a banquet for sixty people, comprised:

- Canapé: Samosa canapés (Simon Rimmer)
- Starter: British beef tartare with a beef consommé and summer vegetables (Matt Tebutt)
- Main: Fresh Kent fish wrapped in courgette with a pork ratatouille (Richard Corrigan)
- Dessert: Ginger floating island with British summer fruits (Angela Hartnett)
- Dustbin Award (for best overall dish): Richard Corrigan

== Series 6 (2011) ==
Series 6 of The Great British Menu started on 4 April 2011. The theme for the series was sharing and communities, with chefs being asked to cook food that encouraged people to come together. During the series, chefs visited and cooked for a number of community groups.

The filming started on 15 March 2011.

=== Heats ===
Region	Won heat	Runner-up	Eliminated	Judge
North East	Andrew Pern	Stephanie Moon	Tim Bilton	Nigel Haworth
Northern Ireland	Chris Fearon	Chris Bell	Brian McCann	Richard Corrigan
North West	Lisa Allen	Johnnie Mountain	Bruno Birkbeck	Marcus Wareing
Central	Aktar Islam	Richard Bainbridge	Sue Ellis	Glynn Purnell
South West	Paul Ainsworth	Andre Garrett	John Hooker	Michael Caines
Scotland	Michael Smith	Tony Singh	Philip Carnegie	Alan Murchison
Wales	Hywel Jones	Aled Williams	Gareth Jones	Angela Hartnett
London and South East	Tom Kerridge	Tom Aikens	Phil Thompson	Jason Atherton

=== Final week ===
In the final week running up to the banquet the chefs cooked one course per day but instead of being ranked first to eighth place the top three chefs were all given a possible dish at the banquet, thus allowing the judges to have more choice when choosing the menu at the end of the week.

==== Guest judges ====
- Starter: Glynn Purnell
- Fish: Richard Corrigan
- Main: Marcus Wareing
- Dessert: Angela Hartnett

==== Final rankings ====
Final rankings of series 6 (2011)
Chef	Region	Starter	Fish	Main	Dessert
Aktar Islam	Central	4th (tie)	Chosen fish	5th (tie)	6th
Andrew Pern	North East	7th	7th	4th	Top 3
Chris Fearon	Northern Ireland	Chosen starter	8th	7th	5th
Hywel Jones	Wales	Top 3	5th	8th	4th
Lisa Allen	North West	Top 3	Top 3	5th (tie)	8th
Michael Smith	Scotland	8th	Top 3	Top 3	Top 3
Paul Ainsworth	South West	4th (tie)	4th	Top 3	Chosen dessert
Tom Kerridge	London and South East	6th	6th	Chosen main	7th

==== Final result ====
- Starter: Chris Fearon – "Season, Shake and Curry On coronation chicken"
- Fish: Aktar Islam – "Sea bass with battered soft shell crab"
- Main: Tom Kerridge – "Hog roast"
- Dessert: Paul Ainsworth – "Taste of the Fairground"

This result made Tom Kerridge the first chef on the Great British Menu to cook the main course twice, as well as being the first chef to cook a pork dish for the main course on the final menu.

== Series 7 (2012) ==
Series 7 of The Great British Menu began on 9 April 2012 with Scotland being the first region to cook. The theme for the series was the Olympics to celebrate the games coming to London. The chefs were tasked with creating a menu that captured the Olympic spirit and during the series they met up with Olympians from the UK to gain inspiration and advice for their menu.

=== Heats ===
Region	Won heat	Runner-up	Eliminated	Judge
Scotland	Alan Murchison	Colin Buchan	Mark Greenaway	Jeremy Lee
Central	Daniel Clifford	Paul Foster	Aktar Islam	Glynn Purnell
North East	Colin McGurran	Charlie Lakin	Stephanie Moon	Nigel Haworth
Northern Ireland	Chris Fearon	Chris Bell	Niall McKenna	Richard Corrigan
North West	Simon Rogan	Aiden Byrne	Johnnie Mountain (Note: After the fish course results, Johnnie Mountain did not appear at the start of the main course, leading to his elimination from the regional heats.)	Marcus Wareing
South East & London	Phil Howard	Marcus McGuinness	Graham Garrett	Jason Atherton
Wales	Stephen Terry	James Sommerin	Richard Davies	Angela Hartnett
South West	Nathan Outlaw	Paul Ainsworth	Simon Hulstone	Tom Kerridge with assistance from Jason Atherton (Note: Atherton assisted with tasting fish course and main course due to Kerridge's shellfish allergy.)

=== Final week ===
in the final week, the winning eight chefs battled for their dishes to be part of the final banquet menu. Each day, the chefs cooked one of their courses for the four judges, who each marked the dish out of a possible ten points. The three highest-scoring dishes for each course went forward for consideration for the final menu. Unlike previous finals weeks, the judges eliminated some dishes based on their performance in the previous round; unless the chefs had made significant changes in response to the feedback received at the regional final, the judges did not wish to taste and score the unsuitable course a second time. The Olympic banquet was held in the Painted Hall at the Old Royal Naval College in Greenwich, London and was broadcast on 8 June, with all four dishes being prepared and presented for 100 guests.

==== Guest judges ====
- Starter: Richard Corrigan
- Fish: Marcus Wareing
- Main: Tom Kerridge
- Dessert: Angela Hartnett

==== Final rankings ====
Final rankings of series 7 (2012)
Chef	Region	Starter	Fish	Main (Note: The top four dishes were selected because two dishes were tied third in scoring.)	Dessert
Alan Murchison	Scotland	Top 3	Top 3	7th	7th
Chris Fearon	Northern Ireland	6th	7th	Eliminated	4th
Colin McGurran	North East	Chosen starter	6th	Top 4	5th
Daniel Clifford	Central	4th	5th	Chosen main	Eliminated
Nathan Outlaw	South West	5th	4th	Top 4	6th
Phil Howard	London & South East	Eliminated	Chosen fish	5th	Top 3
Simon Rogan	North West	Top 3	Top 3	Top 4	Chosen dessert
Stephen Terry	Wales	Eliminated	8th	6th	Top 3

==== Final result ====
- Starter: Colin McGurran – "Quails in the Wood" (recipe)
- Fish: Phil Howard – Cornish mackerel with oysters, mussels, winkles and samphire (recipe)
- Main: Daniel Clifford – Slow poached chicken, sweetcorn egg, spinach with bacon and peas (recipe)
- Dessert: Simon Rogan – Poached pears, atsina cress snow, sweet cheese ice cream and rosehip syrup (recipe)

Daniel Clifford was the first person to win the main course with chicken.

== Series 8 (2013) ==
Series 8 of The Great British Menu, titled Great British Menu Does Comic Relief, commenced on 28 January 2013, with the banquet hosted for people associated with the Comic Relief charity event, held at the Royal Albert Hall.

=== Heats ===
Region	Won heat	Runner-up	Eliminated	Judge	Celebrity guest judge
South East & London	Tom Aikens	Adam Simmonds	Matt Gillan	Richard Corrigan	Arabella Weir
Scotland	Michael Smith	Mark Greenaway	Tony Singh	Angela Hartnett	Debra Stephenson
North West	Aiden Byrne	Mary-Ellen McTague	Chris Holland	Phil Howard	Rowland Rivron
North East	Colin McGurran	Stephanie Moon	Charlie Lakin	Jason Atherton	Tim Brooke-Taylor
South West	Peter Sanchez-Iglesias	Emily Watkins	Chris Eden	Tom Kerridge assisted by Phil Howard (Note: Howard assisted with the Fish course due to Kerridge's shellfish allergy.)	Simon Day
Northern Ireland	Raymond McArdle	Chris Fearon	Ian Orr (Note: Ian Orr's and Raymond McArdle's scores tied but were below Chris Fearon's. To break the tie, Glynn Purnell chose Raymond's menu over Ian's.)	Glynn Purnell	Charlie Higson
Central	Daniel Clifford	Richard Bainbridge	Will Holland	Marcus Wareing	Vic Reeves
Wales	Richard Davies	Mary Ann Gilchrist	Luke Thomas	Jeremy Lee	Emma Kennedy

=== Final week ===
The final week saw the winning eight chefs battle for their dishes to be part of the final banquet menu, but in the main course, the judges added a ninth "wild card" chef, the defeated Central area finalist, Richard Bainbridge, as they thought that his dish was worthy enough to be included for the banquet. Each day, the chefs cooked one of their courses for the four judges, who each marked the dish out of a possible ten points, but in a twist for this series, all the other chefs marked each other's dishes and put their votes in a ballot box. The average score from the chefs was then added to the scores from the judges, who like in the heats, were joined by a comedy guest for each course.

==== Guest judges ====
- Starter: Patricia Hodge
- Fish: Ronni Ancona
- Main: Ade Edmondson
- Dessert: Charlie Higson

The three highest-scoring dishes for each course went forward for consideration for the final menu, but in a final twist, as the judges could not decide which dessert dish should go to the banquet, they decided that both Richard and Daniel's dishes deserved to be put forward to the banquet, with them serving to half the guests each. The Comic Relief banquet was shown in the final show, which was broadcast on 29 March, with all five dishes being prepared and presented for 80 guests.

==== Final rankings ====
Final rankings of series 8 (2013)
Chef	Region	Starter	Fish (Note: The top four dishes were selected because two dishes were tied third in scoring.)	Main	Dessert
Aiden Byrne	North West	4th	Chosen fish	Top 3	8th
Colin McGurran	North East	Top 3	7th	7th	6th
Daniel Clifford	Central	5th	Top 4	4th (tie)	Chosen dessert (tie)
Michael Smith	Scotland	6th	Top 4	Chosen main	Top 3
Peter Sanchez-Iglesias	South West	8th	6th	8th	4th
Raymond McArdle	Northern Ireland	Top 3	8th	9th	5th
Richard Bainbridge	Central	—	—	Top 3	—
Richard Davies	Wales	7th	5th	4th (tie)	Chosen dessert (tie)
Tom Aikens	South East & London	Chosen starter	Top 4	6th	7th

==== Final result ====
- Starter: Tom Aikens – "Chicken Egg, Egg Chicken"
- Fish: Aiden Byrne – "Prawn Cocktail"
- Main: Michael Smith – "I Love Kids, But I Couldn't Eat a Whole One"
- Dessert: Richard Davies and Daniel Clifford – "Strawberries and Cream" and "Going Out With A Bang"

== Great British Budget Menu (2013) ==
The Great British Budget Menu special aired originally on 11 July 2013. James Martin, Angela Hartnett and Richard Corrigan cooked their own meals intended to address food poverty that almost five million people in the United Kingdom endured per then-recent research study. The meals underwent review by the series's regular judges Oliver Matthew, Prue Leith, and Matthew Fort in addition to the special's guest judge Mary Berry.

== Series 9 (2014) ==
Series 9 of The Great British Menu, titled Great British Menu: The D-Day Banquet, commenced on 7 April 2014, with the banquet hosted for people who fought on D-Day, of which it was the 70th anniversary in 2014. The banquet was broadcast on 6 June. It was held at St. Paul's Cathedral.

=== Heats ===
Region	Won heat	Runner-up	Eliminated	Judge	Veteran guest judge
Northern Ireland	Chris McGowan	Raymond McArdle	Will Brown	Tom Kerridge assisted by Marcus Wareing (Note: Wareing assisted with the Fish course due to Kerridge's shellfish allergy.)	Celia Sandys grand-daughter of Winston Churchill
North West	James Durrant	Mary-Ellen McTague	Mark Ellis	Daniel Clifford	George Batts in Royal Engineers during D-Day
South West	Emily Watkins	Josh Eggleton	Dominic Chapman (Note: Emily Watkins's and Dominic Chapman's scores tied but were below Josh Eggleton's. To break the tie, Sat Bains chose Emily's menu over Dominic's.)	Sat Bains	Ken Sturdy signalman during World War II
Central	Aktar Islam	Mark Poynton	Jason Hodnett	Marcus Wareing	Max Hastings
London and South East	Tom Sellers; Adam Simmonds	N/A	Adam Byatt (Note: Tom Sellers's and Adam Byatt's scores tied but were below Adam Simmonds's. To break the tie, Richard Corrigan chose Tom's menu over Adam's.)	Richard Corrigan	Joy Hunter worked in Cabinet War Rooms on D-Day
North East	Colin McGurran	Paul Welburn	Frances Atkins	Phil Howard	Molly Rose flew in Air Transport Auxiliary
Scotland	Jacqueline O'Donnell	Stevie McLaughlin	Neil Rankin	Jeremy Lee	Jim Radford believed to be youngest participant in the Normandy Invasion (as a Merchant Navy Galley Boy)
Wales	David Kelman	Mary Ann Gilchrist	Andy Beaumont	Angela Hartnett	Martin Bell

=== Final week ===
In the final week, the winning nine chefs battled for their dishes to be part of the final banquet menu, but in the dessert, Tom Sellers was taken ill, so only eight chefs competed on that day. Each day, the chefs cooked one of their courses for the four judges, who each marked the dish out of a possible ten points, and like the last series, all the other chefs marked each other's dishes and put their votes in a ballot box. The average score from the chefs was then added to the scores from the judges, who like in the heats, were joined by a D-Day veteran for each course. One other added twist was that before the final marks were given, the chefs and judges each saw what the top three would have been if only the chefs were marking.

==== Guest judges ====
- Starter: George Batts
- Fish: Ken Sturdy
- Main: Baroness Trumpington
- Dessert: Celia Sandys

The three highest-scoring dishes for each course went forward for consideration for the final menu. The D-Day banquet was shown in the final show, which was broadcast on 6 June, with all four dishes being prepared and presented for the veterans and special guest, David Cameron.

==== Final rankings ====
Final rankings of series 9 (2014)
Chef	Region	Starter	Fish	Main (Note: The top four dishes were selected because two dishes were tied third in scoring.)	Dessert
Adam Simmonds	London and South East	Chosen starter	6th	Top 4	6th
Aktar Islam	Central	6th	8th	8th	Top 3
Chris McGowan	Northern Ireland	8th	9th	Top 4	Top 3
Colin McGurran	North East	7th	Top 3	6th	Chosen dessert
David Kelman	Wales	4th	4th	Top 4	7th
Emily Watkins	South West	Top 3	Chosen fish	7th	5th
Jacqueline O'Donnell	Scotland	9th	7th	9th	4th
James Durrant	North West	Top 3	5th	Chosen main	8th
Tom Sellers	London and South East	5th	Top 3	5th	Unable to cook

==== Final result ====
- Starter: Adam Simmonds – "Your Share"
- Fish: Emily Watkins – "We Shall Fight Them On The Beaches"
- Main: James Durrant – "Blitz Spirit"
- Dessert: Colin McGurran – "Homage To The Dickin Medal"

== Series 10 (2015) ==
On 10 June 2015, it was announced that Series 10 of Great British Menu would be broadcast "later in the summer" with the chefs battling it out to cook a course at the banquet at Drapers' Hall in London to celebrate 100 years of the Women's Institute. The series eventually began on 3 August 2015.

=== Heats ===
Region	Won heat	Runner-up	Eliminated	Judge	WI guest judge
Scotland	Jacqueline O'Donnell	Graham Campbell	Jimmy Li	Michael Smith	Angela Baker; WI calendar girl
South West	Josh Eggleton (Note: Josh Eggleton's and Dominic Chapman's scores tied in the judging round of the South West heat. To break the draw, the judges chose Josh's menu over Dominic's.)	Dominic Chapman	Jude Kereama	Emily Watkins	Radhika Bynon; Member of the Forest Gate WI
Wales	Adam Bannister	Phil Carmichael	Stephen Gomes	Tom Kerridge assisted by Tom Aikens on fish course	Rosemary Bishton; Long-standing member of the WI
Northern Ireland	Ben Arnold	Chris McGowan	Danni Barry	Phil Howard	Felicity Cloake; Food writer
North East	Michael O'Hare	Tim Allen	Mini Patel	Marcus Wareing	Kirsty Bowen; WI Sheffield president
North West	Matt Worswick	Eve Townson	Mark Ellis	Sat Bains	Sabrina Ghayour
London & South East	Matt Gillan	Lee Westcott	Mark Froydenlund	Daniel Clifford	Mary Gwynn; Food writer & author
Central	Rich Bainbridge	Pip Lacey	Jason Hodnett	Richard Corrigan	Helen Carey; Former WI chair

=== Final week ===
In the final week, the winning eight chefs battled for their dishes to be part of the final banquet menu. Each day, the chefs cooked one of their courses for the four judges, who each marked the dish out of a possible ten points, and like the previous two series, all the other chefs would be marking each other's dishes and putting their votes in a ballot box. The average score from the chefs was then added to the scores from the judges, who like in the heats, were joined by a WI member for each course. Another added twist was that before the final marks were given, the chefs and judges each saw what the top three would have been if only the chefs were marking.

In another twist for this series, due to the fact that the chefs are cooking for the WI, the judges revealed that only "perfect dishes" would make the shortlist, and unlike the mandatory three in the previous series, for some courses, there might be more or less than that.

==== Guest judges ====
- Starter: Angela Baker
- Fish: Kirsty Bowen
- Main: Felicity Cloake
- Dessert: Mary Gwynn

==== Final rankings ====
The shortlisted dishes for each course went forward for consideration for the final menu. The WI Centenary banquet was shown in the final show, which was broadcast on 9 October, with all four dishes being prepared and presented for the WI guests.

Final rankings of series 10 (2015)
Chef	Region	Starter	Fish	Main	Dessert
Adam Bannister	Wales	5th (tie)	4th	5th	6th
Ben Arnold	Northern Ireland	7th	5th	Top 3	5th
Jacqueline O'Donnell	Scotland	3rd	Shortlisted	8th	7th
Josh Eggleton	South West	Shortlisted	7th	4th	4th
Matt Gillan	London & South East	4th	6th	Won main	Shortlisted
Matt Worswick	North West	5th (tie)	Shortlisted	7th	8th
Michael O'Hare	North East	8th	Chosen fish	6th	3rd
Richard Bainbridge	Central	Chosen starter	8th	Top 3	Chosen dessert

==== Final result ====
- Starter: Rich Bainbridge – "We All Stand For Jerusa-lamb"
- Fish: Michael O'Hare – "Emancipation"
- Main: Matt Gillan – "Teaching And Preaching"
- Dessert: Rich Bainbridge – "Inspiring Women"

== Series 11 (2016) ==
On 30 May 2016, it was announced that Series 11 of Great British Menu would also be broadcast "later in the summer" with the chefs this time cooking in the dining room of the House of Commons in London to celebrate the "Great Britons" of Elizabeth II. The series began on 29 August 2016.

=== Heats ===
Region	Won heat	Runner-up	Eliminated	Judge	Briton guest judge
Scotland	Michael Bremner	Adam Handling	Ally McGrath (Note: Michael Bremner's and Ally McGrath's scores were tied but were below Adam Handling's. To break the tie, Daniel Clifford chose Michael's menu over Ally's.)	Daniel Clifford	Tim Hayward
South West	Josh Eggleton	Jude Kereama	Chris Wheeler	Lisa Allen assisted by Simon Rogan (Note: Rogan assisted tasting Starters and Fish course due to Allen's shellfish allergy.)	Grace Dent
North West	Adam Reid	Matt Worswick	Kim Woodward	Phil Howard	Lady Claire MacDonald OBE
Wales	Phil Carmichael	Adam Bannister	Andrew Birch	Michael Smith	Rosie Birkett
Central	Danny Gill	Daniel Smith	Andrew Scott	Angela Hartnett	Enam Ali
London & South East	Mark Froydenlund	Russell Bateman	Ronnie Murray	Richard Corrigan	Kevin Gould
North East	Tommy Banks	Mini Patel	Chris Archer taken ill after fish course	Tom Aikens	John Williams
Northern Ireland	Mark Abbott	Chris McGowan	Eddie Attwell	Michael O'Hare	Amol Rajan

=== Final week ===
In the final week, the winning eight chefs battled for their dishes to be part of the final banquet menu. Each day, the chefs cooked one of their courses for the four judges, who each marked the dish out of a possible ten points, and like recent series, all the other chefs marked each other's dishes and put their votes in a ballot box. The average score from the chefs was then added to the scores from the judges, who like in the heats, were joined by a veteran for each course. As with recent series, before the final marks were given, the chefs and judges each saw what the top three would have been if only the chefs were marking.

==== Guest judges ====
- Starter: Lady Claire MacDonald OBE
- Fish: Tim Hayward
- Main: John Williams
- Dessert: Grace Dent

==== Final rankings ====
As with the previous series, if certain dishes were thought to be more banquet-worthy than all the other dishes, then the dishes would immediately advance to the banquet.

Final rankings of series 11 (2016)
Chef	Region	Starter	Fish	Main	Dessert
Adam Reid	North West	4th	5th	7th (tie)	Chosen dessert
Danny Gill	Central	8th	6th	5th	7th
Josh Eggleton	South West	3rd	4th	Shortlisted	3rd (tie)
Mark Abbott	Northern Ireland	Won starter	7th	4th	6th
Mark Froydenlund	London & South East	1st (tie) (Note: Judges gave Mark Froydenlund's starter the same perfect score as Mark Abbott's but considered Abbott's more perfect instead.)	8th	Chosen main	8th
Michael Bremner	Scotland	7th	Shortlisted	7th (tie)	3rd (tie)
Phil Carmichael	Wales	5th	Shortlisted	6th	5th
Tommy Banks	North East	6th	Chosen fish	Shortlisted	Shortlisted (Note: Adam Reid's and Tommy Banks's dessert dishes scored all 10s from the judges and chefs' average.)

==== Final result ====
- Starter: Mark Abbott – "Ordinary To Extraordinary"
- Fish: Tommy Banks – "Preserving The Future"
- Main: Mark Froydenlund – "A Celebration Of Rose Veal"
- Dessert: Adam Reid – "Golden Empire"

== Series 12 (2017) ==
The chefs had to cook for a banquet in celebration of the 140th anniversary of Wimbledon. This was the first series with Andi Oliver as a judge, replacing Prue Leith.

=== Heats ===
Region	Won heat	Runner-up	Eliminated	Judge	Tennis guest judge
London & South East	Selin Kiazim	Tom Kemble	Mike Reid	Angela Hartnett	Leon Smith
South West	Tom Brown	Dom Chapman	Andy Clatworthy	Michael O'Hare	Marion Regan
North West	Ellis Barrie	Paul Askew	Tom Parker	Daniel Clifford	Greg Rusedski
North East	Tommy Banks	Josh Overington	Danny Parker	Jeremy Lee	Judy Murray
Scotland	Michael Bremner	Ally McGrath	Angela Malik	Nathan Outlaw	Gary Parsons
Wales	Phil Carmichael	Nick Brodie	Paul Croasdale	Tom Aikens	Dan Bloxham
Central	Pip Lacey	Ryan Simpson	Nick Deverell-Smith	Rich Bainbridge	Jordanne Whiley
Northern Ireland	Tommy Heaney	Eddie Attwell	Joery Castel	Michael Smith	Mansour Bahrami

=== Final week ===
In the final week, the winning eight chefs battled for their dishes to be part of the final banquet menu. Each day, the chefs cooked one of their courses for the four judges, who each marked the dish out of a possible ten points, but in a change to recent series, the chefs no longer had a vote on the dishes. In a further twist, the result for each course was announced at the end of each day, rather than a shortlist of a few dishes being carried forward to the end of the week. In the event of a dead heat, the three regular judges would decide which dish went through to the banquet.

==== Guest judges ====
- Starter: Sue Barker
- Fish: Tim Henman
- Main: Gordon Reid
- Dessert: Annabel Croft

==== Final rankings ====
Final rankings of series 12 (2017)
Chef	Region	Starter	Fish	Main	Dessert
Ellis Barrie	North West	4th	3rd (tie)	5th	6th
Michael Bremner	Scotland	8th	6th	Chosen main (Note: Michael Bremner's and Selin Kiazim's scores tied for the main course final. The judges leaned toward Bremner's main course.)	7th
Phil Carmichael	Wales	6th	3rd (tie)	6th (tie)	5th
Pip Lacey	Central	Chosen starter (Note: Pip Lacey's, Tom Brown's, and Tommy Heaney's scores tied for the starter course final. The judges selected Pip Lacey's starter course.)	8th	8th	4th
Selin Kiazim	London & South East	5th	5th	1st (tie)	Won dessert
Tom Brown	South West	1st (tie)	2nd	6th (tie)	2nd
Tommy Banks	North East	7th	Won fish	3rd	3rd
Tommy Heaney	Northern Ireland	1st (tie)	7th	4th	8th

==== Final result ====
- Starter: Pip Lacey – "Whatever The Weather"
- Fish: Tommy Banks – "Turbot With Strawberries & Cream"
- Main: Michael Bremner – "The Grass Is Greener"
- Dessert: Selin Kiazim – "Honouring Venus Rosewater Champions"

== Series 13 (2018) ==
The 2018 Great British Menu was about celebrating 70 years of the National Health Service (NHS), with 24 chefs attempting to win a place on the final banquet menu, to cook "A Feast To Say Thank You" for people of the NHS to be held in the Great Hall of St Bartholomew's Hospital.

=== Heats ===
Region	Won heat	Runner-up	Eliminated	Judge	Medical guest judge
North East	Dan Fletcher	Danny Parker	Dave Coulson	Angela Hartnett	Dr Anne Weaver
London & South East	James Cochran	Selin Kiazim	Scott Goss	Tom Aikens	Jenny Turner
Scotland	Lorna McNee	Ross Bryans	Ben Reade	Phil Howard	Dr Sara Kayat
Central	Marianne Lumb	Ryan Simpson-Trotman	Sabrina Gidda	Daniel Clifford	Dan Smith
Wales	Chris Harrod	Andrew Sheridan	Jason Hughes	Paul Ainsworth	Aneira Thomas
South West	Tom Brown	Jude Kereama	Olivia Barry	Richard Corrigan	Barbara Childs
North West	Ellis Barrie; Craig Sherrington	N/A	Liam Simpson-Trotman	Michael O'Hare	Dr Jake Dunning
Northern Ireland	Tommy Heaney	Shauna Froydenlund	James Devine (Note: Tommy Heaney's and James Devine's scores tied but were below Shauna Froydenlund's. To break the tie, Jeremy Lee chose Tommy's menu over James's.)	Jeremy Lee	Shehan Hettiaratchy

=== Final week ===
In the final week, the winning nine chefs battle for their dishes to be part of the final banquet menu. Each day, the chefs cooked one of their courses for the four judges, who each marked the dish out of a possible ten points. As with the previous series, the chefs no longer had a vote on the dishes, and the result for each course was announced at the end of each day, rather than a shortlist of a few dishes being carried forward to the end of the week. In the event of a dead heat, the three regular judges would decide which dish went through to the banquet. After the four winning chefs had been announced, the judges revealed that for the first time ever, the guests at the banquet would vote for their favourite dish and a Champion of Champions would be crowned.

==== Guest judges ====
- Starter: Rangan Chatterjee
- Fish: Chris Ogden
- Main: Tom Lynch
- Dessert: Professor Jacqueline Dunkley-Bent

==== Final rankings ====
Final rankings of series 13 (2018)
Chef	Region	Starter	Fish	Main	Dessert
Chris Harrod	Wales	3rd	4th	1st (tie) (Note: Chris Harrod, Craig Sherrington, and Tom Brown all tied with their perfect scores in the main course final. The judges chose Tom Brown's main course for the banquet.)	Chosen dessert (Note: Chris Harrod and Lorna McNee both tied with their perfect scores in the dessert course final. The judges chose Chris Harrod's dessert course for the banquet.)
Craig Sherrington	North West	6th (tie)	6th (tie)	1st (tie)	8th (tie)
Dan Fletcher	North East	2nd	8th	5th (tie)	8th (tie)
Ellis Barrie	North West	6th (tie)	Won fish	9th	6th
James Cochran	London & South East	Won starter	9th	7th	3rd
Lorna McNee	Scotland	5th	6th (tie)	4th	1st (tie)
Marianne Lumb	Central	4th	5th	5th (tie)	4th (tie)
Tom Brown	South West	6th (tie)	2nd (tie)	Chosen main	7th
Tommy Heaney	Northern Ireland	9th	2nd (tie)	8th	4th (tie)

==== Final result ====
- Starter: James Cochran – "Cep-tional"
- Fish: Ellis Barrie – "Bun in the Oven"
- Main: Tom Brown – "Poor Man's Goose"
- Dessert: Chris Harrod – "Tea and Cake"
- Champion of Champions: James Cochran

== Series 14 (2019) ==
In the 2019 Great British Menu, 24 chefs competed to serve a course at Abbey Road Studios for the 50th anniversary of the last time that The Beatles played together.

The kitchen had moved to a new location in Stratford-upon-Avon and, in a change to the transmissions, instead of being five 30-minute shows broadcast between Monday to Friday, the shows became two 1-hour shows on Wednesday and Thursday, with the starter and fish courses on the Wednesday and the main and dessert courses on Thursday, with the judging being unchanged as a 30-minute show on Fridays.

=== Heats ===
Region	Won heat	Runner-up	Eliminated	Judge	Musical guest judge
London & South East	Luke Selby	Ben Marks	Paul Walsh	Angela Hartnett	Mani
North East	Tom Anglesea	Samira Effa	Michael Carr (Note: Michael Carr's and Samira Effa's scores tied but were below Tom Anglesea's. To break the tie, Michael O'Hare chose Samira's menu over Michael Carr's.)	Michael O'Hare	Pete Waterman
Central	Kray Treadwell	Sabrina Gidda	Ryan Simpson-Trotman	Paul Ainsworth	Ali Campbell
North West	Adam Reid	Hrishikesh Desai	Liam Simpson-Trotman	Tom Aikens	Amy Macdonald
Scotland	Lorna McNee	Gordon Jones	Ben Reade	Richard Corrigan	Keisha Buchanan
South West	Lee Smith	Joe Baker	Emily Scott	Daniel Clifford	The Rev. Richard Coles
Wales	Andrew Sheridan	Tom "Westy" Westerland	Cindy Challoner	Phil Howard	JB Gill
Northern Ireland	Chris McClurg	Alex Greene	Glen Wheeler	Tommy Banks	Loyle Carner

=== Final week ===
As in the previous series, all eight chefs cooked all their menus and each course winner was picked at the end of each day. Following the announcement of all the course winners, the judges confirmed that they also wanted the chefs to create vegetarian options of their meals and, like the previous year, there was also a "Champion of Champions" vote with all the diners.

==== Guest judges ====
- Starter: Martin Kemp
- Fish: Kanya King (with assistance from Novelist)
- Main: Andrew Ridgeley
- Dessert: Peter Hook

==== Final rankings ====
Final rankings of series 14 (2019)
Chef	Region	Starter	Fish	Main	Dessert
Adam Reid	North West	2nd	5th	Won main	4th
Andrew Sheridan	Wales	5th	6th	6th	8th
Chris McClurg	Northern Ireland	4th	2nd	2nd	Top 3
Kray Treadwell	Central	6th (tie)	8th	5th	Top 3
Lee Smith	South West	6th (tie)	7th	4th	6th
Lorna McNee	Scotland	3rd	4th	3rd	Won dessert
Luke Selby	London & South East	Won starter	3rd	7th	7th
Tom Anglesea	North East	8th	Won fish	8th	5th

==== Final result ====
- Starter: Luke Selby – "The British Invasion"
- Fish: Tom Anglesea – "Lost Souls in a Fish Bowl"
- Main: Adam Reid – "Comfort Food 'Sounds' Good"
- Dessert: Lorna McNee – "Lime and Sunshine, There's Enough for Everyone"
- Champion of Champions: Lorna McNee

== Series 15 (2020) ==
In the 2020 Great British Menu, many changes were announced to the format. The comedian Susan Calman became the host and hosted in the kitchens at Stratford-upon-Avon. Also, for the first time since series 3, each region had four chefs, instead of three. Each chef was to cook six courses, instead of the usual four. As well as the traditional starter, fish course, main course and dessert, each chef had to create two other courses, which although not marked by the judges, could be used as a tie-breaker if needed. They were an amuse-bouche at the beginning, and a pre-dessert palate cleanser between the main and dessert courses.

The theme for the series was children's literature with the banquet due to be held at Exeter College, Oxford, and each region had its own sub-theme towards the brief.

As with the previous series, the shows were 1 hour long with the amuse-bouche, starter and fish courses on the Wednesday and the main, pre-dessert and dessert courses on Thursday, with the judging being unchanged as a 30-minute show on Fridays. The main difference was that one chef was eliminated after the fish course on day 1, with another chef eliminated after the dessert on day 2.

=== Heats ===
Region	Sub-theme	Won heat	Runner-up	Eliminated after dessert	Eliminated after fish	Judge	Literary guest judge
Central	Fantasy Fiction	Niall Keating	Sally Abé	Dom Robinson	Alex Claridge	Paul Ainsworth	Charlie Higson
London & South East	Capital Authors	Kerth Gumbs	Steve Groves	Ivan Tisdall-Downes	Karl O'Dell	Tommy Banks	Konnie Huq
Scotland	Heroes & Villains	Roberta Hall-McCarron	Amy Elles (Note: Amy Elles was absent throughout the main course day due to her illness but then was able to cook her dessert course the following day. To compensate Amy's return and the attending chefs' less-than-impressive scores for their main courses, before the dessert course began, Michael O'Hare struck out the main course scores and then reverted the remaining chefs' total scores back to ones post-fish/pre-main.)	Ross Bryans	Gordon Jones	Michael O'Hare	David Baddiel
Northern Ireland	Magical Lands & Time Travel	Alex Greene	Shauna Froydenlund	Leigh Ferguson	Paul Cunningham	Tom Aikens	Cerrie Burnell
North West	Action & Adventure	Tom Barnes	Hrishikesh Desai	George Farrugia	Sam Buckley	Angela Hartnett Michael O'Hare for main course	Julia Donaldson
South West	Picture Books & Animal Characters	Joe Baker	Guy Owen	Harriet Mansell	Thomas Carr (Note: Harriet Mansell was originally eliminated after the fish course. However, before the main course began, Thomas Carr withdrew from the competition to spend more time with his newborn son, prompting Harriet to take his place.)	Richard Corrigan	Nina Wadia
Wales	Giants & Dragons	Hywel Griffith	Tom Phillips	John Chantarasak	Georgia Sommerin	Lisa Goodwin-Allen Michael O'Hare for fish course	David Bradley
North East	Real Life	Ruth Hansom	Alex Bond	Josh Angus	Samira Effa	Tom Brown	Jacqueline Wilson

=== Final week ===
The winning eight chefs cook their courses in celebration of nearly 200 years of British children's literature.

==== Guest judges ====
- Starter: Cressida Cowell
- Fish: Malorie Blackman
- Main: Anthony Horowitz
- Dessert: Greg James (with assistance from Chris Smith)

==== Final rankings ====
Final rankings of series 15 (2020)
Chef	Region	Starter	Fish	Main	Dessert
Alex Greene	Northern Ireland	Won starter	6th	2nd (tie)	Won dessert
Hywel Griffith	Wales	3rd	7th	2nd (tie)	4th
Joe Baker	South West	4th	3rd	4th (tie)	6th
Kerth Gumbs	London & South East	8th	4th	8th	Won pre-dessert
Niall Keating	Central	2nd	Won fish	4th (tie)	7th
Roberta Hall-McCarron	Scotland	5th (tie)	5th	7th	3rd
Ruth Hansom	North East	7th	Won amuse-bouche	6th	8th
Tom Barnes	North West	5th (tie)	8th	Won main	5th

==== Final result ====
- Amuse-bouche: Ruth Hansom – "Golden Snitch"
- Starter: Alex Greene – "The Potato, The Onion, The Cheese and The Wardrobe"
- Fish: Niall Keating – "Witches of the Northern Lights"
- Main: Tom Barnes – "Beatrix Potter's Herdwick Lamb"
- Pre-dessert: Kerth Gumbs – "Snozzcumbers and Frobscottle"
- Dessert: Alex Greene – "The Incredible Edible Book"
- Champion of Champions: Niall Keating

Although Ruth Hansom and Kerth Gumbs did not win any of the courses, Ruth's fish course and Kerth's dessert course were the two highest-scoring runners-up, so they were invited to cook the Amuse-bouche and Pre-dessert respectively.

== Great British Christmas Menu (2020) ==
From 1 to 24 December 2020, a special Christmas series was shown. Andi Oliver stepped down from the judging panel and began presenting the series, replacing Susan Calman, and comedian Kerry Godliman took Andi's place as a special guest judge. Twelve previous winners of the show competed to cook their dishes for a six-course banquet originally located at York Hospital. In the first round of each course, various eight of those veteran chefs were selected, and one group of four judges double-blind the other group's dishes in the first rounds. Top three dishes of their respective courses (or four for canapé) are selected for the second round in the judging panel. Godliman is a vegetarian, so chefs cooked vegetarian alternatives of their courses for her.

The main banquet was cancelled due to restrictions during the pandemic, so mini banquets occurred in various areas, while some other units of the six-course meal were home-delivered. The filming of the banquet occurred at a gazebo outside the Hospital under tier-two restrictions during the COVID-19 pandemic.

=== Guest judges ===
- Canapé and starter: Vicky Hall
- Fish and main course: Tim Spector
- Dessert and petit four: Beverley Knight

=== Final result ===
- Canapé: James Cochran – "T'was the Night Before Christmas"; Alex Greene – "Christmas Tree Bauble"; Lisa Goodwin-Allen – "Retro Christmas Canape"
- Starter: Alex Greene – "Not Mushroom under this Tree"
- Fish: Tom Barnes – "Smoked Salmon Over Pine"
- Main course: Lisa Goodwin-Allen – "Christmas Fallow Deer Feast"
- Dessert: Lisa Goodwin-Allen – "Christmas Snowglobe (Thank You)"
- Petit four: Tommy Banks – "The Night Before Christmas"

== Series 16 (2021) ==
Series 16 began on 24 March 2021. The theme of the competition was innovation, celebrating the 30th anniversary of Sir Tim Berners-Lee creation of the World Wide Web. The series also marked the debut of Rachel Khoo as a judge, with Andi Oliver hosting following the series' Christmas Special. The banquet was due to be held at Jodrell Bank Observatory, Cheshire, but as COVID-19 restrictions were still in effect at the time of the series' filming, the banquet was instead held outdoors in a marquee, with full social distancing measures in place.

The first course was referred to as canapés for this season, rather than the amuse-bouche from the last season.

=== Heats ===
Region	Won heat	Runner-up	Eliminated after dessert	Eliminated after fish	Judge	Guest judge
Central	Stuart Collins	Sabrina Gidda	Liam Dillon	Shannon Johnson	Lisa Goodwin-Allen Simon Rogan for fish course	Helen Sharman
Scotland	Roberta Hall-McCarron	Stuart Ralston	Scott Smith	Amy Elles	Tom Brown	Caroline Criado Perez
London & South East	Oli Marlow	Kim Ratcharoen	Tony Parkin	Ben Murphy	Paul Ainsworth	Chris Jackson
Wales	Hywel Griffith	Nathan Davies	Ali Borer	Chris Cleghorn	Tommy Banks	Hugh Hunt
North East & Yorkshire	Alex Bond	Tom Spenceley	Gareth Bartram	Ruth Hansom	Simon Rogan	Sophie Conran
Northern Ireland	Phelim O'Hagan	Gemma Austin	Andy Scollick	Paul Cunningham	Daniel Clifford	Thomas Heatherwick
North West	Dan McGeorge	Kirk Haworth	Dave Critchley	Ashwani Rangta	Tom Aikens	Wayne Hemingway
South West	Jude Kereama	Nick Beardshaw	Elly Wentworth	Nat Tallents (Note: Elly Wentworth's and Nat Tallents's scores and canapés were tied at the end of the fish course. To break the tie, Angela preferred Elly.)	Angela Hartnett Richard Corrigan for main and dessert courses	Colin Furze

=== Final week ===
The winning eight chefs cook their courses in celebration of British innovation.

==== Guest judges ====
- Starter: Phil Wang
- Fish: Zoe Laughlin
- Main: Carol Vorderman
- Dessert: Ed Gamble

==== Final rankings ====
Final rankings of series 16 (2021)
Chef	Region	Starter	Fish	Main	Dessert
Alex Bond	North East & Yorkshire	Won starter	5th	6th	4th
Dan McGeorge	North West	8th	4th	7th	Won dessert
Hywel Griffith	Wales	7th	3rd	2nd (tie)	5th
Jude Kereama	South West	4th	Won canapé	Won pre-dessert	6th
Oli Marlow	London & South East	3rd	6th	Won main	3rd
Phelim O'Hagan	Northern Ireland	6th	8th	5th	8th
Roberta Hall-McCarron	Scotland	5th	Won fish	4th	2nd
Stuart Collins	Central	2nd	7th	8th	7th

==== Final result ====
- Starter: Alex Bond – "The Founding Father"
- Palate cleanser: Jude Kereama – "Double Dose Palate Booster"
- Fish: Roberta Hall-McCarron – "Maxwell's Colour Wheel"
- Main: Oli Marlow – "Special Delivery" (Note: Oli tested positive for COVID-19, and was therefore unable to attend the banquet. The other chefs cooked his dish on his behalf.)
- Dessert: Dan McGeorge – "Give A Dog A Bone"
- Petit four: Jude Kereama – "Planetary Petit Four"
- Champion of Champions: Dan McGeorge

The Canapé and the Pre-dessert were not scored but were awarded to Jude Kereama as the highest runner-up. However, Jude's canapé was changed to be served as a palate cleanser after Alex's starter, and Jude's pre-dessert was changed to be served as a petit four after Dan's dessert.

== Series 17 (2022) ==
Series 17 began on 1 February 2022. The theme of the competition is Great British Broadcasting, coinciding with the 100 year anniversary of the BBC beginning radio broadcasts. The series also saw a whole new judging panel with Ed Gamble, Nisha Katona and former GBM champion Tom Kerridge becoming the new judges, whilst Andi Oliver remained as host. The banquet was held at Alexandra Palace, London, where the BBC's first television broadcast took place in 1936.

In another change to recent series, the heats were shown on Tuesday–Thursday, and the judging episode was extended from a 30 minute episode to a 1 hour episode.

For the first time ever on the series, one of regional heats (South West) consists of all four female chefs in the line-up.

=== Heats ===
Region	Won heat	Runner-up	Eliminated after dessert	Eliminated after fish	Judge	Guest judge
Central	Sally Abé	Ben Orpwood	Liam Dillon	Harvey Perttola	Aktar Islam	Cat Deeley
North West	Sam Lomas	Dave Critchley	Stevie Lamb	Caroline Martins	Lisa Goodwin-Allen Niall Keating for fish course	Sue Cleaver
Wales	Nathan Davies	Tom Phillips	Larkin Cen	Mark Threadgill	Angela Hartnett	Steffan Rhodri
London & South East	Spencer Metzger	Tony Parkin	Angelo Sato	Robbie Lorraine	Michael Caines	Anita Dobson
Scotland	Adam Handling	Stuart Ralston	Calum Montgomery	Fraser Smith	Richard Corrigan Lorna McNee for dessert course	Rory Bremner
North East & Yorkshire	Luke French	Mark Aisthorpe	Elizabeth 'Liz' Cottam	Bobby Geetha	Michael O'Hare	Si King
South West	Olivia 'Liv' Barry	Elly Wentworth	Charlotte Vincent	Nat Tallents	Paul Ainsworth	Priyanga Burford
Northern Ireland	Chris McClurg	Gemma Austin	Stephen Hope	Marty McAdam	Niall Keating	Dev Griffin

=== Final week ===
The winning eight chefs cook their courses in celebration of British broadcasting.

==== Guest judges ====
- Starter: Steve Pemberton
- Fish: Floella Benjamin
- Main: Alison Steadman
- Dessert: Huw Edwards

==== Final rankings ====
Final rankings of series 17 (2022)
Chef	Region	Starter	Fish	Main	Dessert
Adam Handling	Scotland	6th	2nd	4th	6th
Chris McClurg	Northern Ireland	4th	3rd (tie)	2nd	Chosen dessert (Note: Spencer Metzger's and Chris McClurg's desserts tied on scores. To break the tie, the judges and Andi Oliver chose McClurg's dessert by 3–2 vote.)
Olivia 'Liv' Barry	South West	5th	6th	5th	7th
Luke French	North East & Yorkshire	8th	7th (tie)	6th (tie)	3rd (tie)
Nathan Davies	Wales	Won starter	3rd (tie)	8th	5th
Sally Abé	Central	Won canapé	5th	3rd	Won pre-dessert
Sam Lomas	North West	7th	7th (tie)	6th (tie)	8th
Spencer Metzger	London & South East	2nd (tie)	Won fish	Won main	1st (tie)

==== Final result ====
- Canapé: Sally Abé – (Tarlet of whipped chicken with elderberry and port jelly)
- Starter: Nathan Davies – "Merlin's Potion"
- Fish: Spencer Metzger – "Be Careful What You Fish For"
- Main: Spencer Metzger – "First Impressions"
- Pre-dessert: Sally Abé – (Yoghurt sorbet ice lolly, based around It's a Sin)
- Dessert: Chris McClurg – "A 'Trifle' Derry Girls"
- Champion of Champions: Spencer Metzger ("Be Careful What You Fish For")

Sally Abé was the highest placed chef not to cook one of the main plates, so she was chosen to cook her canapé and pre-dessert courses.

== Series 18 (2023) ==
Series 18 began on 31 January 2023. The theme of the competition is British Animation & Illustration, coinciding with the 65th anniversary of the creation of Paddington Bear. The judges and host remained the same as 2022, although for the South West Judging episodes, Marcus Wareing substituted for Tom Kerridge. This year, all starter dishes were required to be vegan and plant-based.

=== Heats ===
Region	Won heat	Runner-up	Eliminated after dessert	Eliminated after fish	Judge	Guest judge
North East	Will Lockwood	Cal Byerley	Gareth Bartram	Rory Welch	Angela Hartnett	Joe Sugg
South West	Nick Beardshaw	Andrew Tuck	Amber Francis	Charlotte Vincent	Michael O'Hare	Susie Templeton
Wales	Mark Threadgill	Georgia Sommerin	Tom 'Westy' Westerland	Simmie Vedi	Lorna McNee Spencer Metzger for main and dessert courses	Gethin Jones
North West	Danielle Heron	László Nagy	Caroline Martins	Sam Grainger	Lisa Goodwin-Allen Spencer Metzger for fish course	Jane Horrocks
Scotland	Adam Handling	Mark McCabe	Kevin Dalgliesh	Tunde 'Abi' Abifarin	Tom Aikens	Frank Quitely
London & South East	Avinash 'Avi' Shashidhara	Robbie Lorraine	Ferdinand 'Budgie' Montoya	Brian Danclair	Tommy Banks	Dapo Adeola
Northern Ireland	Gemma Austin	Kerry Roper	John Hollywood	Matt Jordan	Aktar Islam	Oliver Jeffers
Central	Tom Shepherd	Thom Bateman	Marianne Lumb	Kareem Roberts	Paul Ainsworth	Duaa Karim

=== Final week ===
The winning eight chefs cook their courses in celebration of animation and illustration.

==== Guest judges ====
- Starter: Kulvinder Ghir
- Fish: Peter Lord
- Main: Sir Lenny Henry
- Dessert: Morwenna Banks

==== Final rankings ====
Final rankings of series 18 (2023)
Chef	Region	Starter	Fish	Main	Dessert
Adam Handling	Scotland	3rd (tie)	2nd	2nd	Chosen dessert (Note: Adam Handling's, Nick Beardshaw's, and Tom Shepherd's desserts tied on scores. To break the tie, the judges and Andi Oliver chose Handling's dessert.)
Avinash 'Avi' Shashidhara	London & South East	Won starter	6th (tie)	6th	4th (tie)
Danielle Heron	North West	2nd	6th (tie)	4th	6th
Gemma Austin	Northern Ireland	8th	4th	5th	3rd
Mark Threadgill	Wales	3rd (tie)	8th	8th	4th (tie)
Nick Beardshaw (Note: Nick Beardshaw was a head chef at one of Tom Kerridge's restaurants. Andi Oliver judged Beardshaw's courses throughout the week in place of Kerridge, who stepped aside for the panel's impartial judging.)	South West	3rd (tie)	Won fish	3rd	1st (tie)
Tom Shepherd	Central	7th	5th	Won main	1st (tie)
Will Lockwood	North East	3rd (tie)	3rd	7th	Chosen canapé and pre-dessert (Note: Will Lockwood's pre-dessert was changed to a (post-dessert) cheese course.)

==== Final result ====
- Canapé: Will Lockwood
- Starter: Avinash 'Avi' Shashidhara - "Scrambled Snake by the Lake"
- Fish: Nick Beardshaw - "A Moon Shaped Pool"
- Main: Tom Shepherd - "Cow Pie"
- Dessert: Adam Handling - "Food Fight"
- Cheese course: Will Lockwood
- Champion of Champions: Adam Handling - "Food Fight"

== Series 19 (2024) ==
Series 19 began on 23 January 2024. The theme was the 2024 Summer Olympics. The judges and host remained the same as 2023. As in the previous year, all starter dishes must be plant based and sustainably sourced. The banquet was held at Hôtel de Charost, the British Ambassador's residence in Paris, France.

=== Heats ===
Region	Won heat	Runner-up	Eliminated after dessert	Eliminated after fish	Judge	Guest judge
North East & Yorkshire	Cal Byerley	Samira Effa	Scott John-Hodgson	Adam Degg	Aktar Islam	Shauna Coxsey
Central	Adam Smith	Louisa Ellis	Liam Nichols	Sam Ashton-Booth	Tommy Banks	Jonnie Peacock
London & South East	Kate Austen	Ashok Kumar	Joe Hill	Vince Smith	Simon Rogan	Lutalo Muhammad
Scotland	Ajay Kumar	Kevin Dalgleish	Calum Montgomery	David Millar	Angela Hartnett Adam Handling for main course	Katherine Grainger
Wales	Corrin Harrison	Larkin Cen	Nick Rudge	Lewis Dwyer	Lisa Goodwin-Allen Tom Shepherd for fish course	Colin Jackson
North West	Kirk Haworth	Ryan Stafford	Nina Matsunaga	Andrew Sheridan	Michael O'Hare	Stuart Robinson
Northern Ireland	Melissa McCabe	Lottie Noren	Colin McSherry	Niall Sarhan	Richard Corrigan Spencer Metzger for main and dessert courses	Michael McKillop
South West	Ben Palmer	Elly Wentworth	Andi Tuck	Mike Naidoo	Tom Aikens	Joe Choong

=== Final week ===
The winning eight chefs cook their courses in celebration of the Olympic and Paralympic Games.

==== Guest judges ====
- Starter: Ellie Simmonds
- Fish: Emily Campbell
- Main: Dame Laura Kenny
- Dessert: Dame Jessica Ennis-Hill

==== Final rankings ====
Final rankings of series 19 (2024)
Chef	Region	Starter	Fish	Main	Dessert
Adam Smith	Central	4th	Won fish	3rd	4th
Ajay Kumar	Scotland	6th (tie)	8th	4th (tie)	5th
Ben Palmer	South West	Won starter	7th	2nd	8th
Cal Byerley	North East & Yorkshire	6th (tie)	2nd	4th (tie)	3rd
Corrin Harrison	Wales	Won canapé	3rd	6th (tie)	2nd
Kate Austen	London & South East	5th	5th (tie)	Won main	6th
Kirk Haworth	North West	2nd	5th (tie)	6th (tie)	Won dessert
Melissa McCabe	Northern Ireland	8th	4th	8th	7th

==== Final result ====
- Canapé: Corrin Harrison
- Starter: Ben Palmer – "Firefly" (vegan golden beetroot tart)
- Fish: Adam Smith – "Road to Paris" (poached brill with truffle trout mousse)
- Main: Kate Austen – "Symposium" (stuffed quail, truffle French toast, scotch egg)
- Dessert: Kirk Haworth – "A Taste of Unity" (cacao gateaux with a sour cherry and toasted macadamia topping, coconut blossom ice cream, African pepper, and vanilla caramel sauce)
- Champion of Champions: Kirk Haworth

Kate Austen became the first female chef to serve the main course at the banquet.

In a minor departure from recent series the canapés were served on board the Eurostar taking the guests to Paris and there was no pre-dessert course.

By winning the dessert course Kirk Haworth became, with his father Nigel Haworth, winner of the main course in Series 4 (2009), the first father and son pair to reach the banquet stage of the competition.

== Series 20 (2025) ==
Series 20 began on 28 January 2025. The chefs celebrated Great Britons of the past, to mark the 20th anniversary of the show. Tom Kerridge and Ed Gamble returned as judges, along with new chef Lorna McNee who replaced Nisha Katona. As in the previous two years, all starters had to be fully plant based. The banquet was held at Blenheim Palace, Oxfordshire.

=== Heats ===
Region	Won heat	Runner-up	Eliminated after dessert	Eliminated after fish	Judge	Guest judge
North West	Jack Bond	Eddie Shepherd	Livia Alarcon	James Hill	Paul Ainsworth	Margaret Aspinall
South West	Amber Francis	Nicholas Balfe	Ashleigh Farrand	Joe Fallowfield	Michael Caines Simon Rogan for main and dessert courses	Professor Tracy Daszkiewicz
Scotland	Mark McCabe	Calum Munro	David Millar	Hannah Rose	Aktar Islam	Ben Thompson
North East & Yorkshire	Callum Leslie	Ahmed Abdalla	Minal Patel	Scott John-Hodgson	Michael O'Hare	Greg Jenner
Wales	Daniel ap Geraint	Lewis Dwyer	Ayesha Kalaji	Seb Smith	Spencer Metzger	Cerys Matthews
Central & East	Sally Abé	Harry Kirkpatrick	Thom Bateman	David Taylor	Tommy Banks	Denise Lewis
Northern Ireland	Stevie McCarry	Marty McAdam	Lawrence Barrow (Note: Lawrence Barrow was unable to continue after the main course for medical reasons.)	Jonny Taylor	Angela Hartnett Lisa Goodwin-Allen for main and dessert courses	Pamela Ballantine
London & South East	Jean Delport	Jason Howard	Eran Tibi	Eve Seemann	Tom Aikens Lisa Goodwin-Allen for main and dessert courses	Mina Smallman

=== Final week ===
==== Guest judges ====
- Starter: Gurinder Chadha
- Fish: Russell Kane
- Main: Clare Smyth
- Dessert: Dame Prue Leith

==== Final rankings ====
Final rankings of series 20 (2025)
Chef	Region	Starter	Fish	Main	Dessert
Ahmed Abdalla (Note: Ahmed Abdalla, the highest scoring contestant in the fish course of all chefs in the regional heats, was awarded a wild card by Andi Oliver and replaced Daniel ap Geraint for this round of the final only.)	North East & Yorkshire	—N/a	2nd	—N/a	—N/a
Amber Francis	South West	8th	7th	7th	Chosen dessert (Note: Both Amber Francis and Sally Abé received perfect scores of 40 for their dessert courses. Andi Oliver used her casting vote to declare Amber the winner.)
Callum Leslie	North East & Yorkshire	5th (tie)	5th	3rd (tie) (Note: Strictly speaking, in the main course Jack and Mark finished joint 3rd, and Callum and Daniel joint 5th. However, in the episode the judges described them as finishing joint 2nd and joint 3rd respectively, and are therefore reported here accordingly.)	5th
Calum Munro (Note: Calum Munro, the highest scoring contestant in the main course other than chefs receiving maximum scores, was awarded a wild card by Tom Kerridge and replaced Stevie McCarry for the final round of the course.)	Scotland	—N/a	—N/a	8th	—N/a
Daniel ap Geraint	Wales	2nd	—N/a	3rd (tie)	7th
Jack Bond	North West	4th	3rd	2nd (tie)	6th
Jean Delport	London & South East	5th (tie)	Won fish	Chosen main (Note: Both Jean Delport and Sally Abé received perfect scores of 40 for their main courses. After Andi Oliver was unable to separate them, all five judges conferred and nominated Jean as the winner.)	3rd
Mark McCabe	Scotland	Won canapé	4th	2nd (tie)	4th
Sally Abé	Central & East	Won starter	6th	1st (tie)	1st (tie)
Stevie McCarry	Northern Ireland	7th	8th	—N/a	8th

==== Final result ====
- Canapés: Mark McCabe
- Starter: Sally Abé - "Nursed Back to Health" (Commemorating Florence Nightingale)
- Fish: Jean Delport - "An Ode to Elizabeth" (Celebrating Elizabeth David)
- Main: Jean Delport - "There and Back Again" (A tribute to Charles Ignatius Sancho)
- Dessert: Amber Francis - "Books, the Mind's Food" (Inspired by Hannah More)
- Champion of Champions: Amber Francis

== Series 21 (2026) ==
Series 21 began airing on 24 February 2026. The theme celebrated British movies and movie makers. Tom Kerridge and Lorna McNee returned as judges, with comedian Phil Wang replacing Ed Gamble. As in the past three seasons, the starters needed to be plant based. The banquet was held in St George's Hall, Liverpool, which doubled as the Gotham City Hall in The Batman.

=== Heats ===
Region	Won heat	Runner-up	Eliminated after dessert	Eliminated after fish	Judge	Guest judge
North West	Jack Bond	Paul Leonard	Daniel Heffy	Exose Grant	Lisa Goodwin-Allen Aktar Islam for fish course	Debbie McWilliams
Scotland	Orry Shand	Jun Au	Hannah Rose	Rohan Wadke	Adam Handling	Katherine Parkinson
Central	Nikita Pathakji	Ash Valenzuela-Heeger	Louisa Ellis	James Sherwin	Spencer Metzger Tom Shepherd for main and dessert courses	Alison Owen
Wales	Corrin Harrison	John Chantarasak	Carl Cleghorn	Dan Andrée	Tommy Banks	Sally El Hosaini
North East & Yorkshire	Jamie Keeble	Cal Byerley	Weike Zhao	Ryan McVay	Paul Ainsworth	Frank Cottrell-Boyce
Northern Ireland	Lawrence Barrow	Kristin Reagon	Callum Irwin	Marion Lancial	Sally Abé and Jean Delport (Note: Despite Sally Abé being in charge of scoring the starter and dessert, and Jean Delport being in charge of scoring the fish and main, they were reported as one as both of them scored the canapés and pre-desserts together.)	Lisa Barros D'Sa
London & South East	Josh Hughes	Abbie Hendren	Vince Smith	Dana Choi	Aktar Islam	Simon Callow
South West	Ciaran Brennan	Mark Tuttiett	Jeffrey Robinson	Martin Baylis	Simon Rogan	Ben Whitehead

=== Final week ===
==== Guest judges ====
- Starter: Marli Siu
- Fish: Will Poulter
- Main: Sir Stephen Frears
- Dessert: Joanne Harris

==== Final rankings ====
Final rankings of series 21 (2026)
Chef	Region	Starter	Fish	Main	Dessert
Cal Byerley (Note: Cal Byerley, the highest scoring contestant in the main course of all the regional runner-ups, was awarded a wild card by Andi Oliver and he replaced Lawrence Barrow for the final round of the main course only.)	North East & Yorkshire	—N/a	—N/a	Chosen main (Note: Cal Byerley, Jamie Keeble, and Nikita Pathakji were tied for first place for their main courses. As Cal was Andi Oliver's wild card, Tom Kerridge had the deciding vote, and he declared Cal as the winner, citing the overall balance of the menu as the main reason for his decision.)	—N/a (Note: Cal Byerley was also nominated as Tom Kerridge's wild card for his dessert. However, having been previously chosen to serve the main course at the banquet, Cal elected to withdraw from the dessert final in order to concentrate on the main. As a result, nobody was replaced.)
Ciaran Brennan	South West	2nd	3rd (tie)	6th	Won dessert
Corrin Harrison	Wales	3rd	Won fish	2nd (tie)	3rd
Jack Bond	North West	5th	3rd (tie)	5th	4th (tie)
Jamie Keeble	North East & Yorkshire	4th	3rd (tie)	1st (tie)	6th
Josh Hughes	London & South East	8th	5th	3rd	7th
Lawrence Barrow	Northern Ireland	7th	8th	—N/a	8th
Nikita Pathakji	Central	6th	2nd	1st (tie)	2nd
Orry Shand	Scotland	Won starter	4th	2nd (tie)	4th (tie)

==== Final result ====
- Canapés: Flavoured popcorn from each participating chef (black winter truffle (Orry), dried parma ham (Cal), smoked salt (Ciaran), nori, sesame, and dashi (Nikita)) (Note: Originally, Nikita Pathakji was assigned the canapé course as the highest-scoring runner-up. But, after Nikita replaced Corrin Harrison for the fish course, Andi had planned for popcorn to be served as a canape, with each of the 4 chefs contributing the flavors of the popcorn.)
- Starter: Orry Shand - "Nightcrawler" (Inspired by Alan Cumming and his portrayal of Nightcrawler in X2)
- Fish: Nikita Pathakji - "Draught of Living Death" (Inspired by potion master Horace Slughorn, who was played by Jim Broadbent in later Harry Potter films) (Note: After winning the fish course finals, Corrin Harrison's was set to cook his dish, "The Secret Garden" (Inspired by The Secret Garden and its filming at Bodnant Garden). But, Harrison withdrew from the banquet for personal reasons, so Nikita Pathakji's fish course, which was the runner-up for the course, replaced his.)
- Main: Cal Byerley - "The Full Monty" (Inspired by The Full Monty, filmed in Sheffield)
- Dessert: Ciaran Brennan - "Hay Is For War Horses" (Inspired by War Horse, which was partly filmed in Dartmoor).
- Champion of Champions: Nikita Pathakji
