= Jeremy Lee (chef) =

British chef (born 1963)

Jeremy Lee MBE
- Born: 21 October 1963 (age 62)
- Education: High School of Dundee
- Culinary career
- Cooking style: cuisine
- Current restaurant: Quo Vadis
- Previous restaurants: Frith Street Restaurant; Euphorium; Blueprint Café
- Award won: Tatler Best Kitchen 2013

Jeremy James Lee MBE (born 21 October 1963) is a British chef and chef proprietor at Quo Vadis, London. He had previously been head chef at the Blueprint Café for eighteen years.

== Career ==
Lee's first job in the hospitality business was as a waiter at the Old Mansion House Hotel in Auchterhouse. He started working in the kitchen there instead, and after three years he moved to London where he worked under Simon Hopkinson at Bibendum. He then became head chef at the Frith Street Restaurant and Euphorium before joining the Terence Conran owned Blueprint Café at the Design Museum in 1994. He went on to run the kitchen at the Blueprint for the next eighteen years.

In January 2012, he took over as head chef at Quo Vadis in Soho, replacing Jean-Philippe Patruno. Food writer Matthew Fort compared Lee to Jane Grigson and George Perry-Smith, and was pleased that he had brought his style of cooking with him from the Blueprint Café to Quo Vadis. Jay Rayner described Lee as "one of those rare phenomena in the London food world: a chap everyone agrees is a good thing."

Lee was a finalist in the second series of the BBC Two television series Great British Menu in spring 2007 and presented Could You Eat an Elephant? alongside Fergus Henderson on Channel 4. Lee later appeared as a first round judge for the Wales contenders in 2013 and again as a first round judge for the Scotland contenders in 2014. In 2017 he was first round judge for the North East region. In late 2018 (Season 13) Lee was first round judge for Northern Ireland.

In 2002, he was shortlisted for the Newspaper Cookery Writer award at the Glenfiddich Awards for his work in Guardian Weekend. Quo Vadis was awarded the award for Best Kitchen at the Tatler awards in 2013.

In 2022, Lee published his cookery book titled Cooking: Simply and Well, for One or Many.

Lee was appointed Member of the Order of the British Empire (MBE) in the 2024 New Year Honours for services to the food industry.
