= Clare Smyth =

Northern Irish chef

Clare Smyth MBE
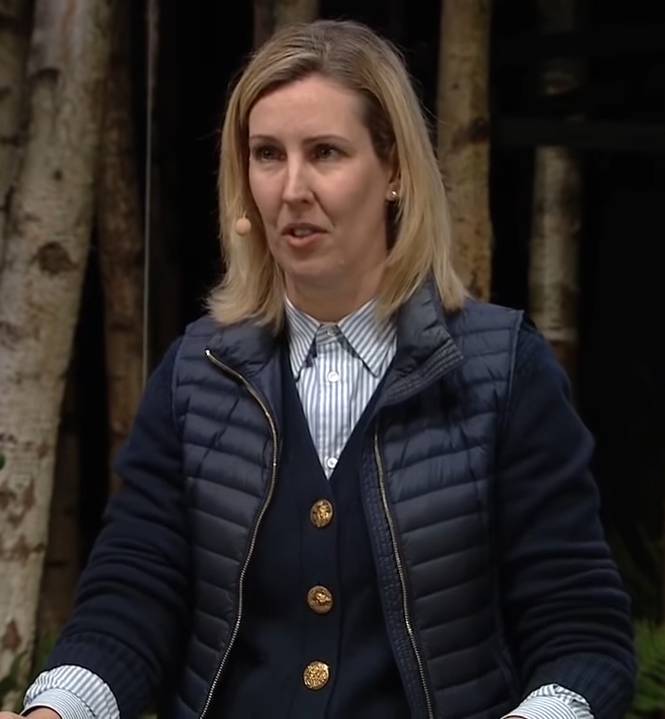
- Smyth in 2018
- Born: 6 September 1978 (age 48); Belfast, Northern Ireland
- Education: Dunluce School Bushmills
- Spouse: Grant
- Culinary career
- Cooking style: Modern British
- Ratings
- Michelin stars AA Rosettes; Good Food Guide
- Current restaurants
- Core by Clare Smyth; Oncore
- Previous restaurants
- Michelin House; Gidleigh Park; St Enodoc Hotel; The French Laundry; Le Louis XV; Restaurant Gordon Ramsay
- Television shows
- Great British Menu; Saturday Kitchen; Masterchef; The Final Table

Clare Smyth (born 6 September 1978) is a British chef. She is the Chef Patron of three-Michelin star Core by Clare Smyth which opened in 2017. Previously she was Chef Patron at Restaurant Gordon Ramsay from 2012 to 2016, won the Chef of the Year award in 2013, and achieved a perfect score in the 2015 edition of the Good Food Guide. Smyth has also appeared on television shows such as Masterchef and Saturday Kitchen.

In 2017, Smyth opened her first restaurant, Core, in London. It was awarded three Michelin stars in the 2021 Michelin Guide, which made her the first Northern Irish woman to have a restaurant awarded three Michelin stars. Her second restaurant, Oncore, opened in Sydney in 2021. With Oncore gaining Three Hats honour in 2022, Smyth became the first ever female chef and second overall to gain three Michelin Stars and become a Three-Hatted Chef.

== Early life ==
Smyth grew up in Belfast. She is the youngest of three children of her father William, a farmer, and mother Doreen, who worked as a waitress at a local restaurant.

At the age of fifteen, Smyth held a job over a holiday period at a local restaurant, inspiring her to become a chef. She left school at sixteen to study catering at Highbury College in Portsmouth, Hampshire.

== Culinary career ==
While at culinary college, Smyth served an apprenticeship at Grayshott Hall, Surrey. She left that post to work full-time at Terence Conran's restaurant at Michelin House, London. She followed this with a six-month period in Australia working for a catering company, and on her return to the UK she staged at a variety of restaurants including The Waterside Inn and Gidleigh Park. She worked at the restaurant of the St Enodoc Hotel in Rock, Cornwall, first as sous chef and then as head chef. While there, she won the title of Young Cornish Fish Chef of the Year.

In 2002, Gordon Ramsay offered Smyth a post at Restaurant Gordon Ramsay. In 2007, she was announced as the new head chef of Restaurant Gordon Ramsay, becoming the first female chef in the United Kingdom to run a restaurant with three Michelin stars. Of the 121 British Michelin-starred restaurants at the time of her appointment, only seven had female head chefs. She had left Ramsay's restaurant to work for a year and a half in Alain Ducasse's Le Louis XV restaurant in Monaco, before returning once more to the UK to run the Chelsea-based restaurant. She took over from Simone Zanoni, who was heading to Versailles to open a new Gordon Ramsay restaurant.

In 2013, Smyth was named the Good Food Guide's 'National Chef of the Year'. Smyth was appointed Member of the Order of the British Empire (MBE) in the 2013 Birthday Honours for services to the hospitality industry.

Smyth was awarded a perfect ten score by the Good Food Guide of the UK's 2015.

She won the Chef Award at the 2016 The Catey Awards, previously won by her mentor Gordon Ramsay in 2000.

=== 2016–2021: Core and Oncore ===
Smyth left Restaurant Gordon Ramsay in 2016 to open her first solo restaurant, Core. Core opened in London's Notting Hill neighbourhood in July 2017. In April 2018, Core was named Best Restaurant at the GQ Food and Drink Awards.

Smyth was named the World's Best Female Chef 2018 by the World's 50 Best Restaurants. In 2018, Smyth appeared as a judge in the "UK" episode of The Final Table, season 1.

On 1 October 2018, Core was awarded two Michelin stars in the 2019 Michelin Guide. Core was awarded three Michelin stars in the 2021 Michelin Guide, which made her the first British woman to have a restaurant awarded three Michelin stars.

In early 2021, it was reported that Smyth would open a restaurant in Sydney, Australia. Oncore, on the 26th floor of the Crown Sydney in Barangaroo opened in November 2021 with head chef Alan Stuart.

A review in Bloomberg described Oncore as "Sydney's best restaurant". Due to ongoing border restrictions to prevent the transmission of COVID-19, Smyth was not able to be at the opening.

=== 2022–present ===
In May 2025, she collaborated with the champagne brand Dom Pérignon for a campaign named "Creation is an Eternal Journey".

In September 2025, Smyth opened her luxury bistro, Corenucopia, in Chelsea, offering her interpretation on British cuisine. In 2026, the same restaurant was awarded its first Michelin Star after being open only for two months.

== Personal life ==
Smyth lives in Wandsworth with her husband, Grant, who works in finance.

== See also ==
- List of female chefs with Michelin stars
