= Sat Bains =

English chef

- Born: 1971 or 1972 (age 54–55); Derby, England
- Education: Derby College
- Spouse: Amanda Bains
- Culinary career
- Cooking style: European cuisine
- Ratings
- Michelin stars; AA Rosettes; Good Food Guide
- Current restaurant
- Restaurant Sat Bains with Rooms
- Previous restaurants
- Martins Arms; Restaurant Sat Bains at Hotel des Clos
- Awardss
- Roux Scholarship 1999; Restaurant Chef's Chef of the Year 2009; Which? Good Food Guide Chef of the Year 2011
- Website: www.restaurantsatbains.com

Satwant Singh "Sat" Bains is an English chef. He and his wife own the two-Michelin star Restaurant Sat Bains with Rooms in Nottingham, England. He won the Roux Scholarship in 1999, and worked in France, before returning to the UK and opening his own restaurant. Bains was one of the winners on the BBC show Great British Menu in 2007.

== Early life and education ==
Satwant Singh Bains was born in Derby, England. His parents were Punjabi Sikhs who had only recently migrated to the UK from India. He has sisters. Throughout his childhood, Bains's father owned a number of shops, resulting in Bains' first job as a paperboy. His mother was a housewife, and cooked mostly vegetarian meals, although would occasionally cook keema on a Saturday. Bains would later recall that he wasn't interested in learning how to cook during his childhood.

Bains left school at 16 and at 18 attended the Wilmorton site of Derby College, joining the catering course because it had the most girls on it. He passed the course, earning a City & Guilds qualification.

== Career ==
He began to work at a restaurant under Mick Murphy, who he later described as an inspiration due to the passion that Murphy had for food.

He read Marco Pierre White cookbook White Heat, which increased his interest in cooking as a career. He would later explain that he read the entire book in three and a half hours, describing it as "iconic". Raymond Blanc hired Bains as one of eighteen staff members for the opening of the first Le Petit Blanc in Oxford in 1996. Bains later recalled that within six months of opening, there were only ten staff members left. He moved on to work at the London-based L'Escargot for 3 months and then returned to Nottingham.

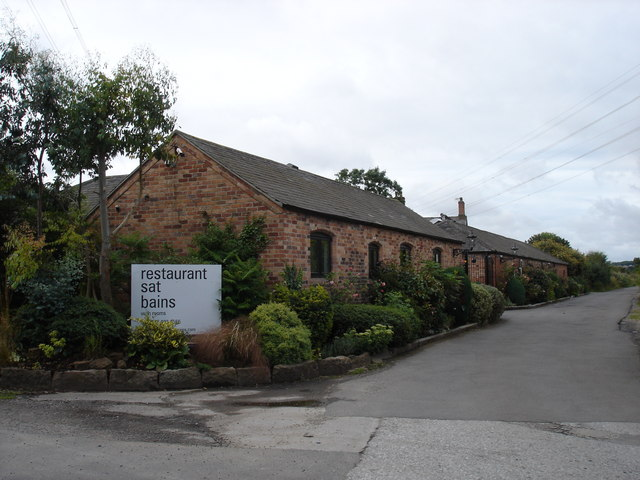
Restaurant Sat Bains with Rooms, in Nottingham

Whilst in Nottingham in 1999, he applied for the Roux Scholarship. Between the regional and national round, the restaurant he was working at closed, leaving him unemployed. Bains won the competition, enabling him to travel to France to work at the three-Michelin-starred Le Jardin des Sens. He worked alongside another chef in training, René Redzepi. While in the south of France, he also chose to visit El Bulli in Spain.

He became head chef at the Hotel des Clos in Nottingham, which was relaunched as Restaurant Sat Bains with Rooms in November 2002. Bains sent one of his sous chefs to Denmark to help his former colleague Redzepi open his restaurant Noma during the same year. Restaurant Sat Bains was awarded a Michelin star in 2003, becoming the first restaurant in Nottingham to win a star. In 2005, Bains and his wife Amanda took over the Nottingham restaurant.

The restaurant's Michelin star rating was increased to two stars in 2011, which food critic Jay Rayner said was overdue. The restaurant has also been awarded five rosettes by the AA.

During the summer of 2012, Bains took a turn in being head chef at a popup restaurant on top of the Southbank Centre in London. The popup, called The Cube, also featured other chefs such as Tom Kitchin and Daniel Clifford.

== Television work ==
After originally declining the chance, he appeared as one of the competitors on the 2007 Great British Menu where fourteen chefs competed to win the chance to cook at a four-course banquet hosted by the British ambassador to France. He won the Midlands and the East heat beating the previous year's winner, Galton Blackiston from Norfolk. In the final round, Bains' starter of slow-cooked duck egg, ham and peas was selected for the final banquet in Paris and was judged the best amongst the seven finalists with three perfect 10 scores from the three judges. Bains went on to add the dish to his menu at Restaurant Sat Bains. Bains credited his appearance on the show for an upturn in sales and a solid booking of the restaurant for the following ten months. He has also made appearances on the BBC's Saturday Kitchen and UKTV's Market Kitchen.

=== Awards ===
Restaurant named him the Chef's Chef of the Year in 2009. He was also named the Which? Good Food Guide Chef of the Year in 2011. The University of Derby awarded Bains an honorary degree of Doctor of Professional Practice in April 2011.

== Personal life ==
Bains has a collection of between 700 and 800 cookbooks, and published his first in September 2012 entitled "Too Many Chiefs Only One Indian". He has stated that his favourite restaurant is Heston Blumenthal's The Fat Duck, or El Bulli in Spain. He is married to his wife Amanda; they met whilst they were both teenagers.
