= Tom Brown (chef) =

British chef

- Born: Tom Brown; 25 July 1987 (age 39); Redruth, Cornwall, England
- Occupation: Chef
- Years active: 2012–present
- Website: Official website

Tom Brown (born 25 July 1987) is a British chef who was a finalist on the Great British Menu (2018). He owned and operated his own restaurant, Cornerstone in Hackney Wick, which closed in June 2024 after 6 years of trading. In 2025, Brown announced his return to the Capital Hotel in Knightsbridge, where he had previously served as head chef of Nathan Outlaw's restaurant. On 10 April 2025, he launched Tom Brown at The Capital, serving a modern seafood tasting menu focused on sustainable British produce.

== Early life ==
Brown was born to Geoff and Janice Brown and raised in Redruth, Cornwall.

He trained with Paul Ripley at The St. Kew Inn. In 2012 he was appointed as chef de partie at the St Enodoc Hotel, Wadebridge, Cornwall and in 2016 became a protégé of acclaimed chef Nathan Outlaw where he held the position as head chef at Outlaws restaurant.
