= Selin Kiazim =

British chef of Turkish Cypriot heritage

- Born: Southgate, London
- Education: Westminster Kingsway College
- Culinary career
- Cooking style: Turkish-Cypriot fusion cuisine
- Current restaurant(s): Oklava
- Previous restaurant(s): Kopapa
- Television show(s): Great British Menu

Selin Kiazim is a British chef of Turkish Cypriot heritage who owns and runs the restaurant Oklava in London. In 2017, she was one of the winners of the BBC Two television series Great British Menu.

== Career ==
Selin Kiazim was brought up in Southgate, London, by her Turkish Cypriot immigrant parents. As a child, she would make frequent trips to Northern Cyprus to visit her grandparents, but did not wish to pursue a career in cooking. Kiazim initially wanted to pursue a career as an architect, but changed her mind after the completion of a foundation course in art and design. Instead, she trained in catering at Westminster Kingsway College where she earned her Professional Chef's Diploma in 2008.

She began working with chef Peter Gordon after she won the 2007 UK-NZ Culinary Challenge. He initially employed her at his Marylebone-based restaurant The Providores and Tapa Room in 2007, before she became head chef at his Kopapa restaurant.

After running a series of pop-up restaurants and residencies, which received highly positive reviews from food critics such as Giles Coren, Kiazim opened her own restaurant, Oklava, in October 2015, located in the Moorgate area of London. The restaurant serves Turkish-Cypriot cuisine, with fusion elements and features a completely Turkish wine list.

In 2017, she competed in the BBC Two television series Great British Menu to create a dish to celebrate 140 years of The Championships, Wimbledon. After beating two other chefs in the qualifying round, she competed in the final. However, in the initial round, her dessert scored the lowest mark, resulting in her making an entirely new dish for the final round. Kiazim made it to the last two chefs for the main course, but was not selected, however, her dessert course was chosen in the final as a banquet dish. She released her first cook book that year, entitled Oklava: Recipes from a Turkish-Cypriot Kitchen. The Council of Turkish Cypriot Associations in Britain named her the Best Champion of Turkish Cypriot Culture 2017 (female).
