= Kenny Atkinson (chef) =

English chef (born 1976)

- Born: December 1976 (age 49); Newcastle upon Tyne
- Education: NVQ Level 1 and 2
- Culinary career
- Cooking style: British cuisine
- Rating: Michelin stars
- Previous restaurants: St Martin's on the Isle; Kenny Atkinson at the White Room; Rockliffe Hall Hurworth; House of Tides
- Television shows: Great British Menu; Saturday Kitchen
- Award won: Chef of the Year 2009 at The Catey Awards

Kenny Atkinson (born in December 1976) is an English chef, who won Michelin stars at the restaurants St Martin's on the Isle, and Kenny Atkinson at the White Room within Seaham Hall. He has appeared on the BBC show Great British Menu, where he has twice been selected as the chef for courses at the final banquets. He was named Chef of the Year at the 2009 Catey Awards. In 2015 he was awarded a Michelin star for his own restaurant House of Tides in Newcastle upon Tyne.

== Biography ==
Atkinson was born in December 1976 in Newcastle upon Tyne in an area north of the St James' Park stadium. He was brought up by his mother after his parents divorced. He began working at the age of fourteen packing Christmas paper and on market stalls. At the age of sixteen, he left school with six GCSE qualifications. He began working in the kitchen of the Ravensdene Lodge Hotel, owned by his uncle, washing dishes.

He completed National Vocational Qualification levels one and two at Newcastle-upon-Tyne College in catering and hospitality and began working at a variety of restaurants in Newcastle. Atkinson also spent five months working as a chef in Crete. After returning to Newcastle, he was spotted by Steve Waites, who took Atkinson with him to a new restaurant in the Midlands. During his two weeks of annual leave, he decided to work for free with Simon Radley at his restaurant within the Chester Grosvenor and Spa. Following Radley's advice, Atkinson moved to London where he gained a position at the Mandarin Oriental hotel. He then took his first head chef position at a restaurant within the Greenway Hotel in Cheltenham. He gained three AA Rosettes, but after three years he failed to gain a Michelin star. He decided to move with his family to the Scilly Isles to work at the St Martin's on the Isle restaurant.

It was there that he won his first Michelin star, which was covered in the national press as the reviewer needed to travel some 400 miles to visit the restaurant. Success led to a new head chef position at the White Room restaurant within Seaham Hall in County Durham. Again, he won a Michelin star. Whilst working there in 2009, he was offered the opportunity to appear on the BBC Two television show, Great British Menu. Another chef had dropped out, so they had a vacancy. He had two weeks to prepare, compared to four months for all the other chefs. He went on to win his heat and his starter dish was selected for the banquet. He subsequently also began to make appearances on the BBC television show Saturday Kitchen. At The Catey Awards later that year, Atkinson was named Chef of the Year.

He returned to the Great British Menu for the following year, and again won the heat. This time his fish course was included in the banquet. It was based on a dish created by Mary Smith with potted mackerel and gooseberries. As the theme was regional, he wanted to use the gooseberries from a local farm. The additional exposure from the television show resulted in Atkinson being offered a position as Food Director, heading up three restaurants at Rockcliffe Hall in County Durham. In April 2013, he left that position but planned to return to the hotel for specific events through 2013. He is aiming to open a new restaurant of his own within the North East of England, and has also made guest appearances at other restaurants in the meanwhile, such as at Tom Kerridge's The Hand and Flowers in Marlow.

In 2014, Atkinson opened House of Tides, a restaurant set over two floors of a Grade I listed 16th century merchant's house on Newcastle upon Tyne's quayside. In 2015, less than 18 months after opening, House of Tides was awarded one Michelin star and, in 2021, it ranked fourth in the National Restaurant Awards Top 100, an annual ranking of UK restaurants.

In 2022, Atkinson and his partner Abbie opened Solstice by Kenny Atkinson, a small fine dining restaurant in a venue the pair had previously operated as Violet's Café, less than half a mile from House of Tides. After operating for only 8 months, it was awarded a Michelin star in March 2023 - the first time there has been multiple Michelin star restaurants in Newcastle upon Tyne.
