= Emily Watkins =

British chef and TV personality

- Born: Dorset, England
- Spouse: Miles Lampson
- Culinary career
- Cooking style: British cuisine
- Rating: AA rosettes
- Current restaurant: The Kingham Plough
- Television show: Great British Menu

Emily Watkins is a British chef at The Kingham Plough gastropub restaurant in Gloucestershire, having previously worked in Florence and at The Fat Duck. She was one of the winners of 2014's season of the Great British Menu.

== Career ==
Emily Watkins was interested in cooking from an early age, because of a love of eating food. Her mother ran a country house hotel in Dorset, where Watkins would help out on occasion along with her sisters. However, she was steered away from pursuing cooking professionally, instead going to University and afterwards working in an office for six months.

She left, and travelled to Italy where she decided to follow up on her dreams of becoming a chef. She travelled, hoping to convince someone to take on a staff member with no experience, eventually landing a role in Florence at Ristorante Beccofino. Initially as a front of house worker, who also spent two days per week in the kitchen, she was moved fully into a chef role after two months. Within two years, she had become a junior sous chef and had become fluent in Italian.

In 2002, she moved back to England where she worked at The Fat Duck under Heston Blumenthal on the sauce section. It was at this point that the restaurant was awarded a third Michelin star and was named the Best Restaurant in the World. She left in 2005, having suffered a hip injury from standing all day, becoming a private chef in London. Two years later she moved to Gloucestershire, where her sister told her that a local pub, The Plough Inn, was for sale. It was there at the age of 28 that she opened her own restaurant along with business partner Adam Dorrien Smith, called The Kingham Plough. She uses local ingredients, and serves twists on well known British dishes. It has won several awards, including being awarded three rosettes by The Automobile Association and was named ninth in Estrella Damm's list of the top 50 gastropubs in the UK in 2016. In 2019, she sold the restaurant to new owners Matt and Katie Beamish.

She competed in the 2014 season of BBC Two's Great British Menu competition, reaching the final where she was chosen to serve her fish course "Fight them on the beaches" at St. Paul's Cathedral in honour of the 70th anniversary of the D-Day Landings. The dish had been inspired by both of her grandfathers, one of which had worked at the War Office, while the other was stationed on the battleship HMS Valiant and was later a prisoner of war.

== Personal life ==
Watkins has four children with her husband Miles Lampson. After fellow chef Monica Galetti questioned the ability for female chefs to both work and have children, Watkins said:

Although there are times when my husband would say that I've put my job before my family, I'm happy with my career. I don't think I could put any more into it or take any more out of it. I always wanted to be a chef and I always wanted to be a mum, but the business was my baby and I'd never missed a serving.
