= Stephen Gomes =

Welsh chef and restaurateur (born 1976)

- Born: c. 1976 (age 49–50); Bombay, Maharashtra, India
- Culinary career
- Cooking style: Indian
- Previous restaurant: Moksh (Cardiff)
- Awards won: Ethnic Chef of the Year Award; Goldstar Welsh Curry Chef of the Year; Goldstar English Curry Chef of the Year; Dessert of the Year 2019; Best UK Indian Chef

Stephen James Gomes (born c. 1976) is a Welsh chef and restaurateur based in Cardiff and Essex. He represented Wales in Series 10 of the Great British Menu in 2015. He won accolades for his restaurant Moksh and operated other restaurants across Cardiff.

== Awards ==
Gomes' recognition as a chef includes: Ethnic Chef of the Year Award at the UK Craft Guild of Chef's award 2015, Goldstar Welsh Curry Chef of the Year at the Welsh Curry Awards 2014, Goldstar English Curry Chef of the Year at the English Curry Awards 2013. 'Dessert of the Year 2019' at the Feed The Lion Food Awards, tipping them as a strong contender for the UK's first fully halal Michelin-ranked menu. He has held the title of 'Best UK Indian Chef' with the Cobra Good Curry Guide for a large part of the last decade.

== Personal life ==
Gomes comes from a family of restaurateurs. His father, James Gomes, worked as an Executive Chef in India at the first five-star beach hotel there and his grandfather served as a chef on board a battleship during World War II. His great grandfather was Head Chef at the Eastern Shipping Company during the Raj.
