= Mark Hix =

English chef and restaurateur (born 1962)

Mark Hix MBE
- Born: Mark Ernest Hix; 10 December 1962 (age 63); West Bay, Dorset, England
- Education: Weymouth College
- Culinary career
- Cooking style: British cuisine

Mark Ernest Hix MBE is an English chef and restaurateur whose traditional English menus often feature foraged and local foods. Prior to the COVID-19 pandemic, Hix was based in London, but announced in January 2021 that he would be relocating to Dorset permanently after five of his restaurants were put into administration.

== Early life ==
Hix was born and raised in West Bay, Dorset. His parents divorced when he was six; while his brother Kevin went to live with their mother, their father had custody of Mark. His father was absent much of the time, so he spent a lot of time with his paternal grandfather, who was a jack of all trades: a chrysanthemum gardener, Bridport mayor, and bar owner. Hix decided to take domestic science rather than metalwork because he heard it was a good place to meet girls; to his surprise, he won a cooking award not long after. Though he considered becoming a professional golfer, he ended up attending the local Weymouth Culinary College instead.

== Career ==
Hix moved to London from Dorset when he was 18 and his first job was in the staff canteen at the London Hilton on Park Lane. He had his first head chef position at age 22. Since then, he has worked at both The Ivy and Le Caprice, and became Caprice Holding's Chef Director in 1999. After 17 years with the company, he left in 2007 to open the successful Hix Oyster and Chop House near the Smithfield market with business partner Ratnesh Bagdai.

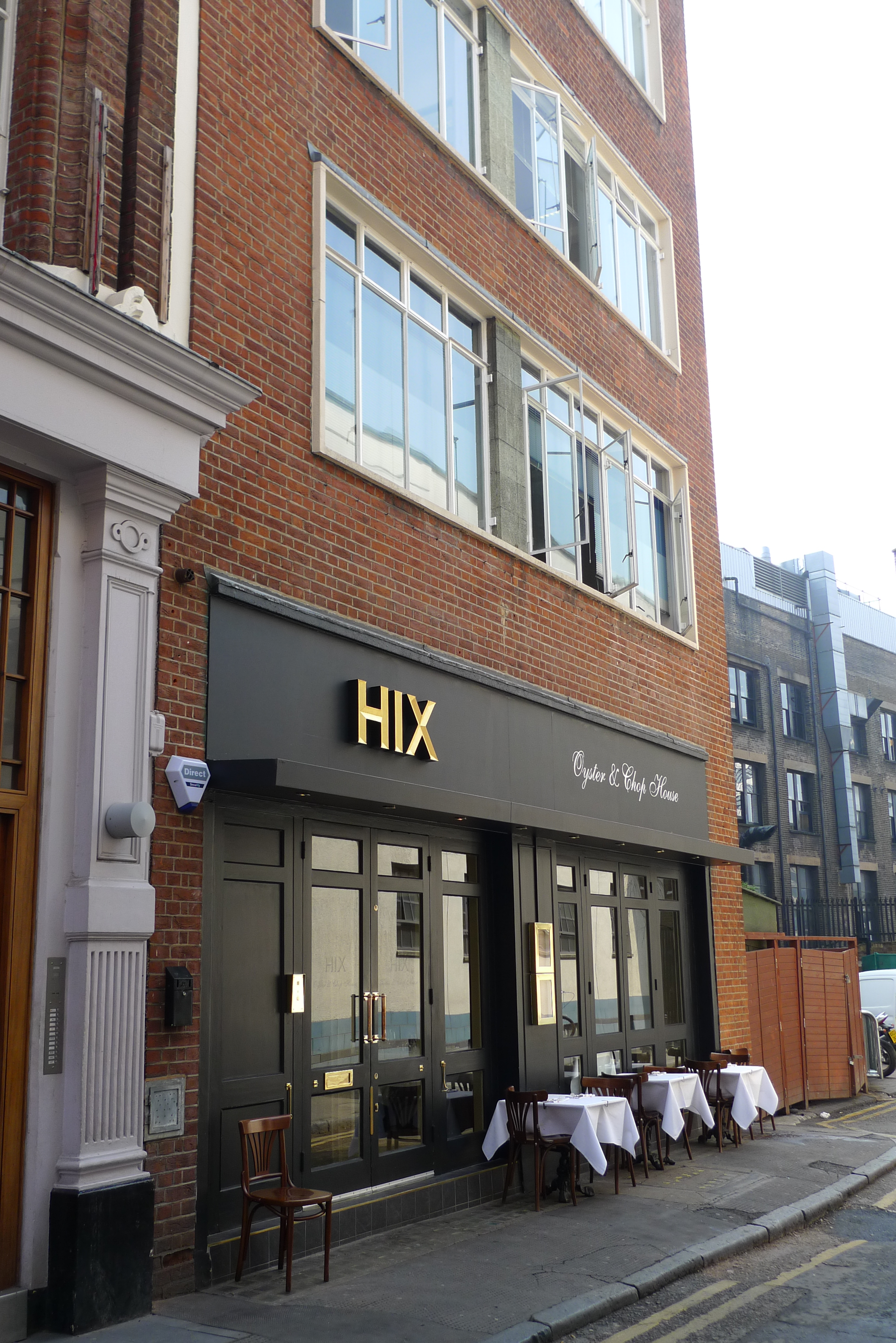
Hix Oyster And Chop House in Smithfield

Following the success of Chop House, Hix opened HIX Mayfair (previously The Abermarle), which opened inside Brown's Hotel in 2008 and closed in 2017; HIX Soho, opened in 2009 and closed in 2019; HIX Belgravia, opened in London's Hotel Belgravia in 2011 and closed the following year; and HIX City (previously Hixter City) in Devonshire Square, open 2013 to 2015. The City and Soho locations also featured a Mark's Bar. A third Mark's Bar, the first stand-alone location, opened at The Old Vic theatre in 2015 and closed in 2020 due to the COVID-19 pandemic.

HIX has also operated a number of restaurants outside his main London HIX brand. In 2005, while still working for Caprice, Hix opened The Rivington Bar and Grill, which he operated anonymously until Caprice later bought the restaurant. It closed in 2017 and was replaced by the Blacklock Shoreditch. The Tramshed, also in Shoreditch, opened in 2011 and Hixter Bankside in 2014; both closed when Hix's restaurants went into administration in 2020 in the wake of the COVID-19 pandemic. The Tramshed had a basement art gallery and Bankside had a Mark's Bar. Back home in Dorset, Hix opened the HIX Oyster and Fish House (2008—2020, 2020—present) and boutique hotel the HIX Townhouse (2014—2020), both in Lyme Regis. He also previously operated a Champagne and caviar bar inside Selfridges on Oxford Street, which was open between 2010 and 2013, and a small pop-up cocktail bar, opened in 2013 and now closed. He and longtime friend Damien Hirst collaborated on the opening of Pharmacy 2, a revival of Hirst's Notting Hill restaurant Pharmacy (1997—2003), in Vauxhall next to Hirst's Newport Street Gallery. Pharmacy 2 is now closed.

In 2016, he went into business with hospitality group Westbury Street Holdings (WSH) and became a minor shareholder. In April 2020, shortly after COVID-19 shutdowns began, WSH put Hix's restaurants in administration, which closed Hix Oyster and Chop House, Bankside, Tramshed, Mark's Bar, HIX Soho, and HIX Oyster and Fish House. He claims this was done without his consent, input, or knowledge. Prior to the closures, HIX restaurants employed 130 staff members. Hix moved home to Dorset to regroup. Just two months later, Hix started the HIX Oyster and Fish Truck out of a converted Chevrolet ambulance he found on eBay for £8,000. In July, he reopened the Oyster and Fish House and was hired as the Director of Food and Drink and as art curator for 1 Lombard Street's reopening. He has also purchased The Fox Inn in Corscombe from PJ Harvey's mother, a family friend, and opened the country pub in December 2020 on his 58th birthday. The inn's restaurant features local ingredients. Hix reopened Mark's Bar in Soho in October 2020.

In January 2021, he announced he would be relocating permanently to Dorset.

=== Other ventures ===
Hix collaborates with alma mater Weymouth College, which named their culinary programme Hix Academy in his honour and sponsors the HIX Award, an annual art prize for emerging artists.

=== Television and Publications ===
Hix competed in the BBC television series Great British Menu in 2007, winning the South West England heat and beating the reigning champion, Michael Caines. In doing so, two of his courses were put forward for the public vote. The main course was a crayfish and rabbit stargazy pie and, for dessert, a perry jelly with summer fruits with an elderflower ice-cream. He has also appeared on Saturday Kitchen, Food and Drink, This Morning, Global Pulse, and the minidocumentary Mark Hix on Salt.

In addition to his cookbooks, Hix has written for The Telegraph (2020—present), City A.M., GQ, The Independent (2002—2016), and Esquire UK. In March 2021, he started hosting Soul Kitchen on Lyme Bay Radio with Neil Charlton.

== Controversy ==
Popular British television chef Keith Floyd lunched at Hix Oyster and Fish House hours before he suffered a fatal heart attack in September 2009. After Floyd's death, Hix offered a special on the menu called 'Keith Floyd's Last Lunch' which was seen by some as an appropriate tribute and was criticised by others.

== Personal life ==
He and his ex Lara Cazalet have a daughter. He also has twin daughters from a previous relationship.

== Honours and awards ==
Hix was awarded an MBE in the 2017 New Year Honours for services to hospitality.

== Cookbooks ==
- Eat Up: Food for Children of All Ages (ISBN 9781841151472, 9781856137768, 9780007146772, 2000)
- Simple Ways to Success: British (ISBN 9781844000487, 2003)
- Fish etc. The Ultimate Book for Seafood lovers (ISBN 9781844001125, 9781844001958, 2004)
- British Food (ISBN 9781844002139, 2005)
- Simple Art of Marrying Food and Wine (with Malcolm Gluck) (ISBN 9781845330798, 2005)
- British Regional Food (ISBN 9781844002344, 2006), (ISBN 9781844005994, 2008)
- British Seasonal Food (ISBN 9781844006229, 2008), (ISBN 9781844009435, 2011)
- Easy Everyday British (ISBN 9781844007820, 2009)
- Hix Oyster & Chop House (ISBN 9781844003921, 2010)
- Fish Etc: The Ultimate Book for Seafood Lovers (ISBN 9781844009718, 2011)
- Mark Hix on Baking: Savoury & Sweet Recipes (ISBN 9781849491242, 2012)
- British Regional Food (ISBN 9781849491686, 2012)
- Valeria Napoleone's Catalogue of Exquisite Recipes (with Valeria Napoleone and Jennifer Higgie) (ISBN 9783863351243, 2012)
- Mark Hix: The Collection (ISBN 9781849493178, 2013)
- Hooked: Adventures in Angling & Eating (ISBN 9781784725549, 2019)
