= Lorna McNee =

Scottish chef

Lorna McNee is a Scottish chef who was a winner of Great British Menu in 2019.

== Early life ==
McNee was born in 1987 and raised in Forres, Scotland. She attended Dallas Primary School and Forres Academy.

She studied at Moray College before spending two weeks at Gordon Ramsay at Claridge's.

She undertook work experience at Restaurant Andrew Fairlie at Gleneagles Hotel at which she was the sous-chef. She won Game Chef of the Year in 2016 and National Scottish Chef of the Year in 2017.

She became the head chef of Glasgow restaurant Cail Bruich in August 2020. It won a Michelin Star in January 2021 and was the first Michelin Star restaurant in Glasgow in 18 years.
