= Adam Handling =

British chef and restaurateur (born 1988)

Adam Handling MBE
- Born: Adam Handling; 17 September 1988 (age 38); Scotland, UK
- Children: Oliver Handling
- Culinary career
- Current restaurants
- Frog; The Loch and The Tyne; Ugly Butterfly; Eve Bar; The Tartan Fox; Adam Handling Chocolate Shop
- Television shows
- Great British Menu; Top Chef; MasterChef: The Professionals; Saturday Kitchen
- Website: www.adamhandling.co.uk

Adam Peter Ritchie Handling MBE (born 17 September 1988 in Dundee, Scotland) is a British chef and restaurateur. He was a finalist on MasterChef: The Professionals in 2013 and won the Champion of Champions title on Great British Menu in 2023. Handling is the owner of the Adam Handling Collection of six food and drink venues in London, England.

Handling was appointed MBE in the 2024 New Year Honours for services to hospitality and international trade.

== Career ==
Handling began his culinary training at the age of 16 as an apprentice chef at Gleneagles Hotel in Scotland. He later worked in London and became sous chef at the Malmaison hotel in Newcastle upon Tyne. He then moved back to Scotland where he worked as head chef at the Fairmont St Andrews.

In 2013, Handling became head chef at St. Ermin's Hotel, London. That year, he competed in the sixth series of Masterchef: The Professionals, reaching the final.

In 2014, Handling opened Restaurant Adam Handling at Caxton, which received three rosettes award from the AA. In October 2014, he published his first cookbook, Smile or Get Out of the Kitchen, with a foreword by Masterchef judge Monica Galetti.

In June 2016, Handling opened The Frog, in Spitalfields, London, and also appeared in series 11 of Great British Menu. In September 2017, he opened Frog by Adam Handling in Covent Garden, followed by the Eve Bar.

In 2021, Handling prepared food for world leaders attending the G7 Summit in Cornwall. Ingredients were sourced predominantly from within a 100-mile radius of the summit venue as part of efforts to reduce its environmental impact. In the same year, he opened The Loch & the Tyne, a restaurant and pub with guest accommodation in Old Windsor. He also opened Ugly Butterfly, a restaurant and bar in Carbis Bay. The restaurant relocated to Newquay, Cornwall in July 2025.

In 2023, Handling published three books: Frog by Adam Handling, Why Waste? and Perfect, Three Cherries. In March 2023, he appeared as a guest judge of the segment "Quickfire Challenge" on Top Chef: World All-Stars. The following month, Handling won BBC's Great British Menu Champion of Champions award.

A trifle created by Handling, featuring parkin, ginger custard and strawberry jelly, was selected as the official pudding for the coronation of King Charles III in May 2023.

In 2025 and 2026, The Adam Handling Collection held food festival at the Tartan Fox restaurant. In May 2026, Handling established Ahrelia, a caviar company.

== Restaurants ==
The Adam Handling Restaurant Collection operates restaurants, bars and pubs in London and other parts of England. The group has introduced zero waste practices aimed at reducing food waste, including the use of ingredients and offcuts.

Frog by Adam Handling opened in September 2017, alongside bar venue Eve Bar. In May 2020, the group launched Hame, a nationwide home-delivery service offering dishes from its restaurants.

The group's first pub, The Loch and The Tyne in Old Windsor, was opened in May 2021. In August 2021, Handling opened Ugly Butterfly, which moved from its original site in Carbis Bay to Newquay, Cornwall in July 2025.

In July 2024, the company opened the Tartan Fox pub near Newquay in Cornwall. In March 2025, Handling opened the Adam Handling Chocolate Shop in Covent Garden.

== Honours and awards ==
Handling was appointed Member of the Order of the British Empire (MBE) in the 2024 New Year Honours for services to hospitality and international trade.

- Acorn Award 2013 by magazine The Caterer as one of "30 under 30 to watch"
- British Culinary Federation "Chef of the Year 2014"
- Scottish Chef of the Year Award 2015
- Chef of the Year, Food and Travel magazine 2019
- Restaurateur of the Year, British GQ Food and Drink Awards 2020
- Scottish Power’s COP26 Green Power List
- Restaurant Chef Award 2023 Craft Guild of Chefs Awards

== Bibliography ==
- Handling, Adam; Galetti, Monica (1 October 2014). Smile or get out of the kitchen (1st ed.). Sheffield: Meze Publishing. ISBN 9780992898120.
- Handling, Adam (2022). Why Waste? A Way With Media Ltd. ISBN 978-1-910469-58-3
- Handling, Adam (2022). Frog. A Way With Media Ltd. ISBN 978-1-910469-57-6
- Handling, Adam (2022). Perfect, Three Cherries. A Way With Media Ltd. ISBN 978-1-910469-59-0
