= Nathan Outlaw =

English chef

- Born: 7 March 1978 (age 48)
- Education: School
- Culinary career
- Cooking style: Fish on a plate
- Rating: Michelin stars
- Current restaurants: Outlaws New Road; Outlaws Fish Kitchen; Outlaws Guest House
- Previous restaurant: The Black Pig
- Television shows: Great British Menu; Saturday Kitchen
- Website: Restaurant Nathan Outlaw

Nathan Outlaw (born March 1978) is an English professional chef who has worked previously with television chef Rick Stein. He now runs his two Michelin star restaurants, Outlaws New Road and Outlaws Fish Kitchen, in Port Isaac, Cornwall. He has appeared on television shows such as BBC's Great British Menu and Saturday Kitchen.

== Early life ==
At the age of fourteen, he began working with his father, who was a chef. Outlaw's first job was buttering toast at his father's restaurant at age eight. He trained as a chef for two years at Thanet College in Broadstairs, doing a National Vocational Qualification level 2 in Food Preparation.

== Career ==
Outlaw's first job as a chef was with Peter Kromberg at the InterContinental London Park Lane in London. Positions alongside chefs Gary Rhodes and Eric Chavot followed. Between 1998 and 2000, he worked with chefs Rick Stein and Paul Ripley in Padstow, Cornwall. Stein and Outlaw have remained friends ever since. He went on to work at the two Michelin starred restaurant Lords of the Manor with head chef John Campbell.

In May 2003, he opened his first restaurant Black Pig, with his philosophy of cooking with quality ingredients from small producers and farmers around Britain, and developing them into dishes with modern and contemporary style. He was awarded his first Michelin star in the following January at the age of 28. In 2006, he took over the restaurant at the Marina Villa in Fowey, Cornwall, opening his Restaurant Nathan Outlaw in 2007.

In 2009, The Good Food Guide included Outlaw's restaurant at the eleventh position, and described the chef as making "discreet but powerful waves" in the industry. He opened his second restaurant, the Nathan Outlaw Seafood Bar and Grill, at the St Enodoc hotel in Rock, Cornwall, in May during the same year.

The 2010 Good Food Guide saw his restaurant move up one place and into the top ten for the first time, with Outlaw described as a "wizard". During the same year, he also competed in BBC's Great British Menu. Outlaw supported the Cornwall Fire and Rescue Service's campaign to prevent cooking related fires at Christmas. The 2011 Michelin Guide awarded Nathan his second star at his restaurant. Outlaw has also appeared on the television show Saturday Kitchen.

2012 saw the launch of Outlaw's first cookbook. 2023 saw a further cookbook, Fish For Dinner.

== Personal life ==
Outlaw met his wife Rachel while he was working with Rick Stein. She was one of the front of house staff. They have two children together, Jacob and Jessica.
