= Restaurant Nathan Outlaw =

- Interactive map of Restaurant Nathan Outlaw

Restaurant information
- Chef: Nathan Outlaw
- Food type: Seafood
- Rating: (Michelin Guide)
- Location: 6 New Road, Port Isaac, Cornwall, PL29 3SB, UK
- Coordinates: 50°35′39″N 4°49′43″W
- Seating capacity: 20
- Reservations: Yes
- Website: Official website

Restaurant Nathan Outlaw is a two Michelin star restaurant owned and operated by Nathan Outlaw. It has previously been located in Marina Villa Hotel in Fowey, Cornwall, and in the St Enodoc Hotel in Rock, Cornwall. In March 2015 the restaurant relocated to Port Isaac, Cornwall and retained its two Michelin stars upon review.

== Description ==
The restaurant was located at the Marina Villa Hotel in Fowey, Cornwall, between 2007 and November 2009. Outlaw closed the restaurant at the location as the hotel went on the market after the owner signalled his intention to retire from the business. Restaurant Nathan Outlaw relocated to the St Enodoc Hotel in Rock, Cornwall, in February 2010. It became the second Nathan Outlaw restaurant at the hotel, joining the previously opened Nathan Outlaw Seafood and Grill. Outlaw brought over most of the staff from the restaurant's previous location.

At the National Restaurant Awards in 2010 where it was ranked eleventh, it was also awarded the Restaurateur's Choice award. Following the restaurant being awarded its second Michelin star in 2010, the turnover rose by 30% in the following year. Also in 2011, the restaurant was ranked in fifth place by the Good Food Guide. The Guide also awarded the restaurant the title of Best Fish Restaurant 2011.

The restaurant currently has two Michelin stars, and four AA rosettes. It is the only seafood restaurant in the UK to hold a Michelin star.

== Reception ==
While the restaurant was located in the Marina Villa at Fowey, Matthew Fort reviewed the restaurant for The Guardian. He was positive of the entire experience, despite visiting on a day in which Outlaw was not in the kitchen. It was the first time the critic had tried wreckfish, and described it as "beautifully cooked and hugely satisfying", while the pudding was "damned fine". Harper's Bazaar described the cooking as "precise and flavourful", and the restaurant as "chic and decidedly un-seasidey" despite its location on the Fowey Estuary. Zoe Williams visited the restaurant for The Daily Telegraph, but found the experience disappointing, with the main courses suffering from a number of problems. The restaurant was given a score of five out of ten.

Harden's restaurant guide rating system (where 1 is high and 5 is low) has rated the food as 1, and the service and ambience both as 3. The restaurant itself is described as "small and very intimate", and Outlaw's cooking as "genius". Celebrity chef James Martin recommended the restaurant while acting as guest editor for At Home magazine.
