= Shaun Rankin =

British chef

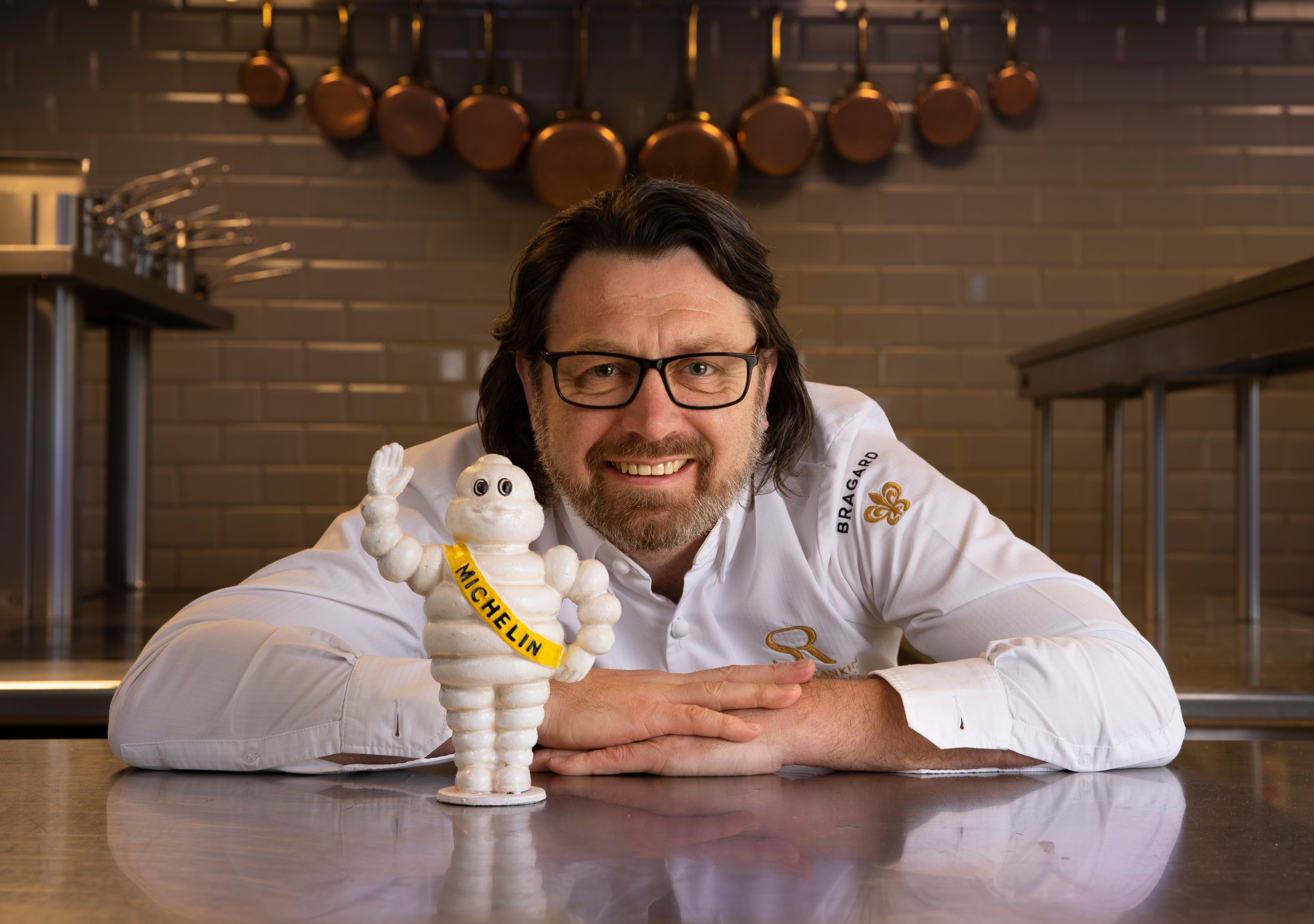
Shaun Rankin

Shaun Rankin (born 1972) is an English-born British chef, restaurateur, and television personality. He has been awarded one Michelin star for Bohemia restaurant in 2005. Rankin ran Ormer Mayfair in London until 2021. Shaun Rankin is chef-patron at the Michelin-starred restaurant at Grantley Hall, which opened in July 2019.

== Early life and education ==
Shaun Rankin was born in 1972, in [Ferryhill] County Durham, North East England. Rankin grew up in North Yorkshire, leaving secondary school at 16 to begin a three-year apprenticeship at the Mayfair Hotel in London. He then attended a cooking course at the Thames Valley University, Slough. He returned to Yorkshire in 1992 to take on position as chef de partie at the Black Bull Inn in Moulton, soon beginning to gain experience all over the world including Charlie Trotter's in Chicago and Fraser's in Western Australia.

== Career ==
Rankin moved in 1994 to work at Longueville Manor in Jersey. After eight years at Longueville – and the hotel's sister restaurant, Sumas – he was asked to head up the opening of Bohemia in St Helier, the capital of Jersey. The restaurant was awarded a Michelin star in 2005.

In 2009 Rankin represented the southwest in the fourth series of BBC Two's Great British Menu, winning the show with a dish of "Treacle Tart with Jersey clotted cream and raspberry ripple coulis". Since appearing on national TV he made numerous further appearances on popular cookery show Saturday Kitchen. In 2010 Rankin launched his own food range in partnership with Cimandis in the Channel Islands. He also embarked on more TV work and filmed his first series 'Shaun Rankin's Island Feast' with Channel Television ITV travelling across Jersey, Guernsey, Alderney, Sark and Herm.

Rankin launched his debut recipe book 'Shaun Rankin's Seasoned Islands' in 2010. It included over 75 recipes and imagery of the Channel Islands where he is based. The book (published by The Refinery) sold over 5000 copies in its first six months. His recipes also feature in 'Yes Chef!’, 'Nigel Haworth's Obsession' and alongside the Michel Roux Jr and Raymond Blanc in 'The Good Food Guide Recipes'.

In June 2011, Rankin represented Britain in Tasmania at the major food festival Savour Tasmania. He has also appeared at UK food events such as Taste London, Southampton Boat Show and Dorset Seafood Festival, also presenting a pop-up restaurant at The Dorchester, London.

In January 2013, Rankin left Bohemia after nine years as head chef to focus on opening his own venture. In May 2013 he opened the highly anticipated restaurant 'Ormer' in the centre of St Helier, Jersey. Named after a seafood delicacy native to the Channel Islands 'Ormer' was awarded a Michelin star within four months of opening. In January 2014, Ormer was accredited with 3 AA rosettes, later on in the year the business was named 'Best Newcomer' at the coveted Food and Travel Magazine Awards 2014. The restaurant was also shortlisted for Food and Travel Magazine 'Restaurant of the Year – Outside London' 2016.

In December 2013 Shaun opened his own delicatessen 'Don Street Deli' adjacent to Ormer restaurant in Jersey. The Deli offers luxury retail products and artisan food offerings. In December 2014 Shaun was selected to set up the food and beverage offering of elite members club 12 Hay Hill in London Mayfair.

In March 2016 Shaun began his partnership with the Flemings Mayfair hotel as part of a £15million refurbishment programme. The boutique hotel's 85-cover restaurant, Ormer Mayfair, opened on 20 September 2016.

Shaun and Ormer Mayfair featured in the 2017 Masterchef UK when the restaurant became a location for the programme. The contestants were put to the test in the professional kitchen under the guidance of Shaun Rankin.

In November 2017 Shaun was removed from Ormer Jersey by its owners and announced that he would be leaving Jersey to concentrate on Ormer Mayfair.

== Personal life ==
Rankin was married to Cheryl and he has two sons.

Rankin is a British Celebrity Ambassador for Teenage Cancer Trust, helping to raise funds for the charity and consulting on food related issues for young cancer sufferers and their families. In 2011 he was appointed as an ambassador for The Jersey Royal Company.

== Television appearances ==
- The Great British Menu (BBC Two, 2009)
- Saturday Kitchen (BBC one)
- Shaun Rankin’s Island Feast (ITV, November 2010)
- Meet What You Eat (Channel 4, June 2016)
- MasterChef UK (BBC One, April 2017)

== Bibliography ==
- Shaun Rankin's Seasoned Islands' (2010), ISBN 978-0956679604
