= Market Kitchen =

British cookery television programme

- Genre: Cookery
- Presented by: Rachel Allen; Amanda Lamb; Matt Tebbutt; Tom Parker Bowles; Matthew Fort
- Country of origin: United Kingdom
- Original language: English
- No. of series: 2

Production
- Executive producers: Nicola Moody; Janice Gabriel; Ben Adler; Patricia Llewellyn
- Producers: Leila Salim, Ceri Elms, Jayne Hibbitt Smith, Adam Webb, Alan Boyle
- Production locations: London, England
- Production company: Optomen

Original release
- Network: Good Food
- Release: April 2007 – 2010

Market Kitchen is a British cookery television programme, made by Optomen, that premiered on the Good Food channel in 2007. Presented by Rachel Allen, Amanda Lamb, Matt Tebbutt, Tom Parker Bowles and Matthew Fort, the programme concentrates on seasonal cooking and features visits to a local market to obtain seasonal produce. The first series was presented from a customised kitchen in Borough Market and featured Tana Ramsay as one of its presenters.

In 2009, the programme incorporated the Local Food Hero competition, which had previously had its own series on UKTV Food. It will feature the winner of a competition to find Britain's best pudding, launched by Christopher Biggins in April 2010. In 2010, spin-off, Market Kitchen's: Big Adventure, aired on Good Food.

Penny Smith and Matt Tebbutt co-presented the programme's fourth season, Market Kitchen: Big Adventure, in 2010. Beginning to air on 18 October, there were 125 episodes.

== Reception ==
In a negative review, the Evening Standard said, "Given that the best food programme of the decade was axed to make way for Market Kitchen, the decision so far seems disastrously misguided. The show looks hastily made (I'm told they record five in two days), the location cameras are "hot" (over-exposed), the editing is appalling, the approach is far too London-centric, the prompted questions from members of the public serve no purpose, and the scores of negative postings on UKTV Food's message boards suggest that the channel has made a very serious mistake indeed." Of the programme, Western Daily Press wrote, "this is UKTV Food's crass successor to the outstandingly good Great Food Live - which it scrapped, inexplicably".

In a positive review, The Australian's Graeme Blundell called the show "entertaining, informative, interactive and presented by highly literate foodies, chefs and food writers". Keith Austin of The Sydney Morning Herald penned a favourable review, writing, "Certainly not the sexiest cooking show around but to my mind this is one of the most approachable and least up itself. With London's foodie central Borough Market as the backdrop, the show is a comforting mish-mash of recipes cooked up from scratch, food tastings, celebrity guest chefs and a front-of-house team who, quite literally, know their onions."
