= Matthew Fort =

British food writer and critic (born 1947)

Matthew Fort (born 29 January 1947) is a British food writer and critic.

Matthew Fort is the son of the Conservative MP Richard Fort, who died when he was 12. His brother is the writer Tom Fort. He attended Eton College, and later Lancaster University. He was the Food and Drink editor of The Guardian for over ten years. He also writes for Esquire, The Observer, Country Living, Decanter and Waitrose Food Illustrated.

His books include Rhubarb and Black Pudding (1998), about the Bolton born chef Paul Heathcote and his Michelin Starred Longridge restaurant. The book focused on both the recipes and the suppliers who played a vital part in the success of the restaurant, Lancashire, and Eating up Italy: Voyages on a Vespa (2004), along with its sequel Sweet Honey, Bitter Lemons (2008). He has also contributed to other writers' work, including Nigel Slater's book and television series Real Food and Rick Stein's television series Food Heroes. He was also a co-presenter of Market Kitchen on UKTV Food.

In 1992, Fort was Glenfiddich Food Writer of the Year, and in 1993, Glenfiddich Restaurant Writer of the Year and The Restaurateurs' Association Food Writer of the Year.

From 2006 to 2021, Fort appeared as a judge on the BBC television series Great British Menu.

Fort Tweeted on 10 October 2011 that his tenure at the Guardian was to end in January 2012.

== Bibliography ==
- Fort, Matthew (3 April 2008). Sweet Honey, Bitter Lemons: Travels in Sicily on a Vespa. Ebury Press. ISBN 978-0-09-191080-8.
