= Alan Murchison =

British restaurateur

- Born: 1971 (age 54–55); Inverness, Scotland
- Known for: Michelin starred L'Ortolan

Alan Murchison (born 1971) is a former Michelin-starred Scottish chef and restaurateur, living in England.

== Career ==
Murchison started his kitchen career as a kitchen porter, aged 14. Like most chefs, he worked in a number of restaurants, learning and promoting along the way. He had stints in Claridges, Inverlochy Castle, Le Manoir aux Quat'Saisons, L'Ortolan and Nobu. In 1999, he became director of the cookery school of Le Manoir aux Quat'Saisons.

Murchison returned to L'Ortolan in 2001 this time as head chef. In 2003, the restaurant was awarded a Michelin star. Two years later he left to take up a position as executive head chef at Chewton Glen hotel in New Milton, Hampshire. He left three months later. After a few minor consultancy jobs, Murchison rejoined L'ortolan in September 2004, this time as director-executive head chef with an option to buy the restaurant.

In 2007, Murchison jumped on the opportunity to buy the former Hibiscus restaurant in Ludlow, Shropshire from Claude Bosi. He reopened the place as La Bécasse.

Later, Murchison founded "Alan Murchison Restaurants Ltd.", later restyled as the 10 in 8 Fine Dining Group. The general idea behind it was:

The 10 in 8 concept was born in response to Alan Murchison's ambition to build a financially sustainable collection of fine dining restaurants over an eight-year period. Each restaurant would be individual, representing the highest standards the industry could offer and be capable of earning at least one Michelin Star within just 3 years of opening.

The group now includes four restaurants and a cookery school.

Alan Murchison acquired Paris House in late 2009. The Woburn, Bedfordshire-based restaurant was bought out of the legacy of Peter Chandler, who died earlier in 2009.

Murchison also acted as mentor for the Nestlé Toque d'Or student catering competition 2010. In Murchison's opinion it is "to give something back, having benefited from strong mentorship early in his career".

In 2010, Murchison added the New Angel restaurant to his "10 in 8 Fine Dining Group". He had the plan to reopen is with its original name Carved Angels, but found out that was impossible due to trademark issues. At the end, the restaurant reopened as Angélique.

Murchison appeared on a BBC series Great British Menu. He lost to Tom Kitchin in 2009 in the Scotland heats. He won the Scotland heats in 2010 and 2012 but did not win the finals. In 2011, Murchison reappeared on Great British Menu once as a judge for the Scottish heats.

In November 2013, Alan Murchison Restaurants was liquidated, leaving more than fifty creditors with unpaid amount of £447,209.29 (equivalent to £627,028.17 in 2025) owed by the group. In 2014, Paris House and 10 in 8 also fell into liquidation. Later that same year, Murchison resigned as executive chef of L'Ortolan.

== Plant-based diet ==
In 2019, Murchison opposed plant-based diets and suggested that one could not be a plant-based athlete "at any level". In 2025 he changed his mind commenting that there "was quite a lot of misinformation out there". In 2024 he prepared 50% of food as plant-based for his riders within Specialized Factory Racing, claiming "we had our most successful year in the history of the sport". In 2025, Murchison authored The Cycling Chef: Plant-Powered Performance: Vegan Recipes to Fuel Your Ride. He is not vegan but chooses to eat plant-based when he can and recommends preparing meals with beans, chickpeas and lentils.

== Personal life ==
Murchison is married to Fiona and has four children. He is a talented amateur cyclist and duathlete, becoming World and European sprint duathlon champion in his age group in 2013, 2014 and 2015 at championships held in Horst, the Netherlands; Ottawa, Canada; and Pontevedra, Spain.

== Selected publications ==
- Food for Thought, 2007
- The Cycling Chef: Recipes for Performance and Pleasure, 2019
- The Cycling Chef: Recipes for Getting Lean and Fuelling the Machine, 2021
- The Cycling Chef: Plant-Powered Performance: Vegan Recipes to Fuel Your Ride, 2025
