= Maddox Street =

Street in Mayfair, London

Coordinates: 51.5126°N 0.1428°W

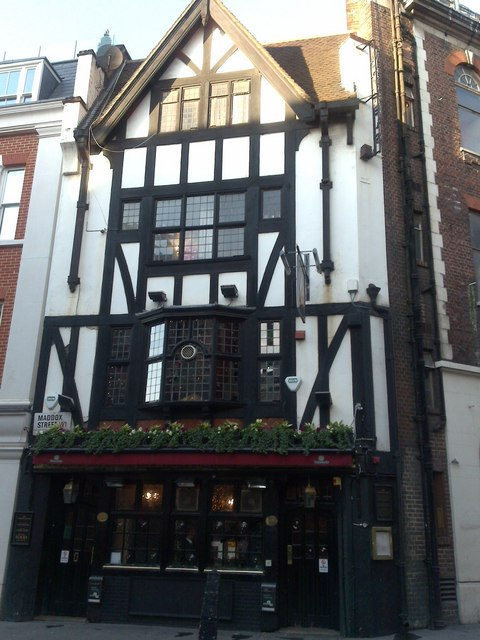
The Mason's Arms, a public house in Maddox Street

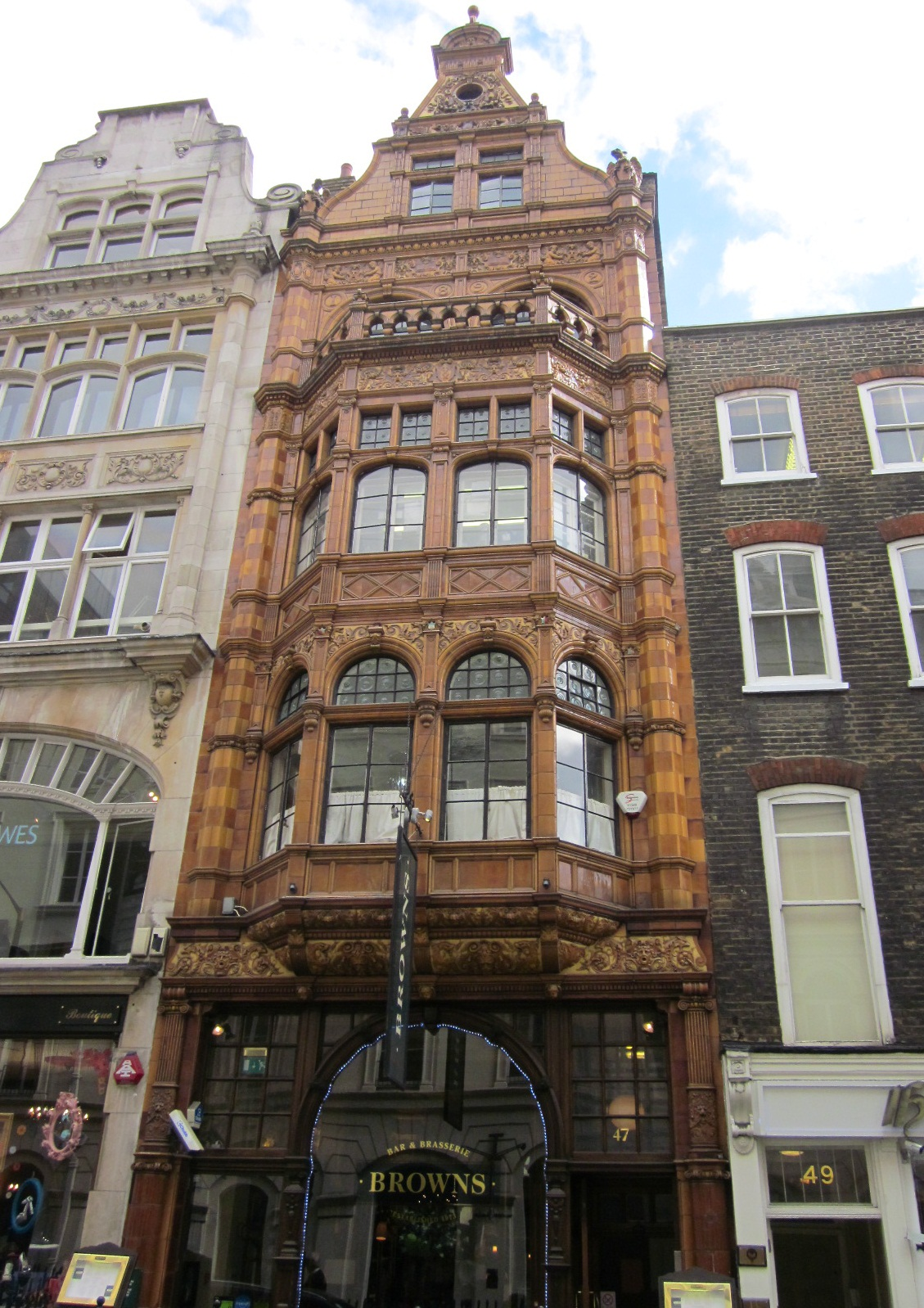
47 Maddox Street

Maddox Street is a street in the Mayfair area of London, extending from Regent Street to St George's, Hanover Square and on to New Bond Street.

== History ==
Maddox Street was completed in 1720. It was named after Sir Benjamin Maddox, a tailor, who owned the Millfield estate on which the street was built. Around 1890 Maddox Street had many tailoring firms in what was known as the Golden Mile of bespoke tailoring. It stretched from Piccadilly and Sackville Street in the south, though and around Savile Row and up to Hanover Square, known as Savile Row Tailoring today. There were also dressmakers and jewellers.

The Mason's Arms, located at 38 Maddox Street, was built in 1721 and rebuilt in its current form in 1934.

William Cooling, a bespoke tailor, bought No. 47 in 1929 as his home and as a shop for his business. He had briefly been in partnership with James Poole (Henry Poole & Co). In 1892/3 William’s grandsons, George Washington and William Cooling Lawrence, completely rebuilt the house adding an extra floor, ground floor extension and the imposing facade we see today, which was designed by Walter Williams. The Lawrences' firm, Cooling, Lawrence & Sons, was one of the largest in Mayfair. It continued to grow and more space was needed. In 1903 they extended the building into the demise of 39/40 New Bond Street, adding new cutting and fitting rooms on the ground floor and four floors of workshops above. They also developed 39-42 New Bond Street as commercial premises in 1908. In 1945, Cooling, Lawrence & Sons went into partnership with J. B. & F. Wells, another family firm from No 57 Conduit Street, then run by Sidney Wells. They formed a new firm, Cooling, Lawrence & Wells. In 1975 Cooling, Lawrence and Wells merged with J. C. Wells (a different family) from St George Street to create a new firm Wells of Mayfair. In 1977, Cordas and Bright, another Maddox Street tailor, also merged into Wells. Wells of Mayfair left No. 47 in 1989 after 160 years of tailoring at the location and moved to 13 Savile Row. In 1992, Wells of Mayfair was acquired by Davies & Son.

Dickenson's Drawing Gallery, whose teachers included John Mogford and whose students included Emily Mary Osborn, was established at 18 Maddox Street in the early 19th century: the premises are now known as ArtSpace Galleries. Nearby, Maddox Gallery is based at 9 Maddox Street, one of several art galleries on this road. A Museum of Building Appliances, established in the street in 1866, no longer exists.

Famous residents have included Samuel Whitbread, the Member of Parliament and brewer, who lived at 33 Maddox Street in the late 19th century, Harry Wooldridge, the English musical antiquary, who lived with Robert Bridges, the Poet Laureate, at 50 Maddox Street in the 1890s and Edward Gathorne-Hardy, the British Bohemian socialite, who lived at 39 Maddox Street in the 1930s.

Alligator Rainwear, a subsidiary of the London Waterproof Company founded by Reuben Satinoff after the First World War, had its trading office on Maddox Street.

Wilkinson & Son, tailors and robemakers to the King, were based at 34 Maddox Street in the 1920s.

The Rolling Stones operated from offices at 46A Maddox Street and Chappell Recording Studios, where the Beatles held recording sessions in the 1960s, was also located at 52 Maddox Street.

Hibiscus, a London restaurant owned and run by French chef Claude Bosi, was located at 29 Maddox Street until it closed in 2016.

The fictitious female occult detective and palmist Miss Diana Marburg, created by L.T. Meade and Robert Eustace in 1902, lived in Maddox Street and was indeed known as "The Oracle of Maddox Street".
