= The Cube (restaurant) =

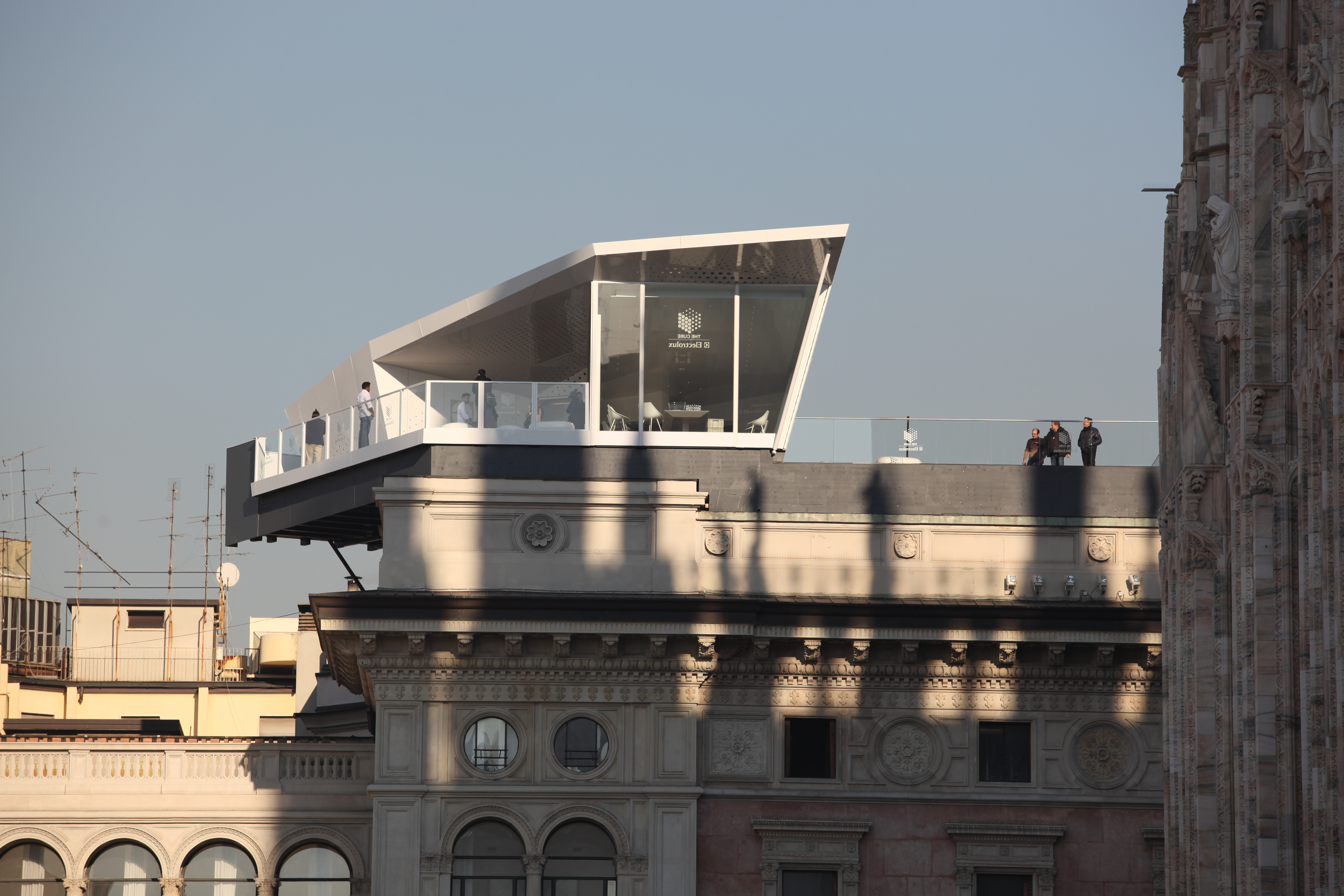
- The Cube, located in Milan, Italy

Restaurant information
- Established: 2011
- Owner: Electrolux
- Chef: Varies
- Food type: Varies
- Location: Milan and Brussels (2011); London and Stockholm (2012)
- Seating capacity: 18
- Reservations: Reservations only
- Website: www.electrolux.co.uk/Cube/

The Cube is a pop-up restaurant created by Electrolux. Since 2011, two versions of the restaurant have been located in different cities in Europe, where a number of guest celebrity chefs have brought teams and dishes from their own restaurants to cook in the spaces.

== Description ==
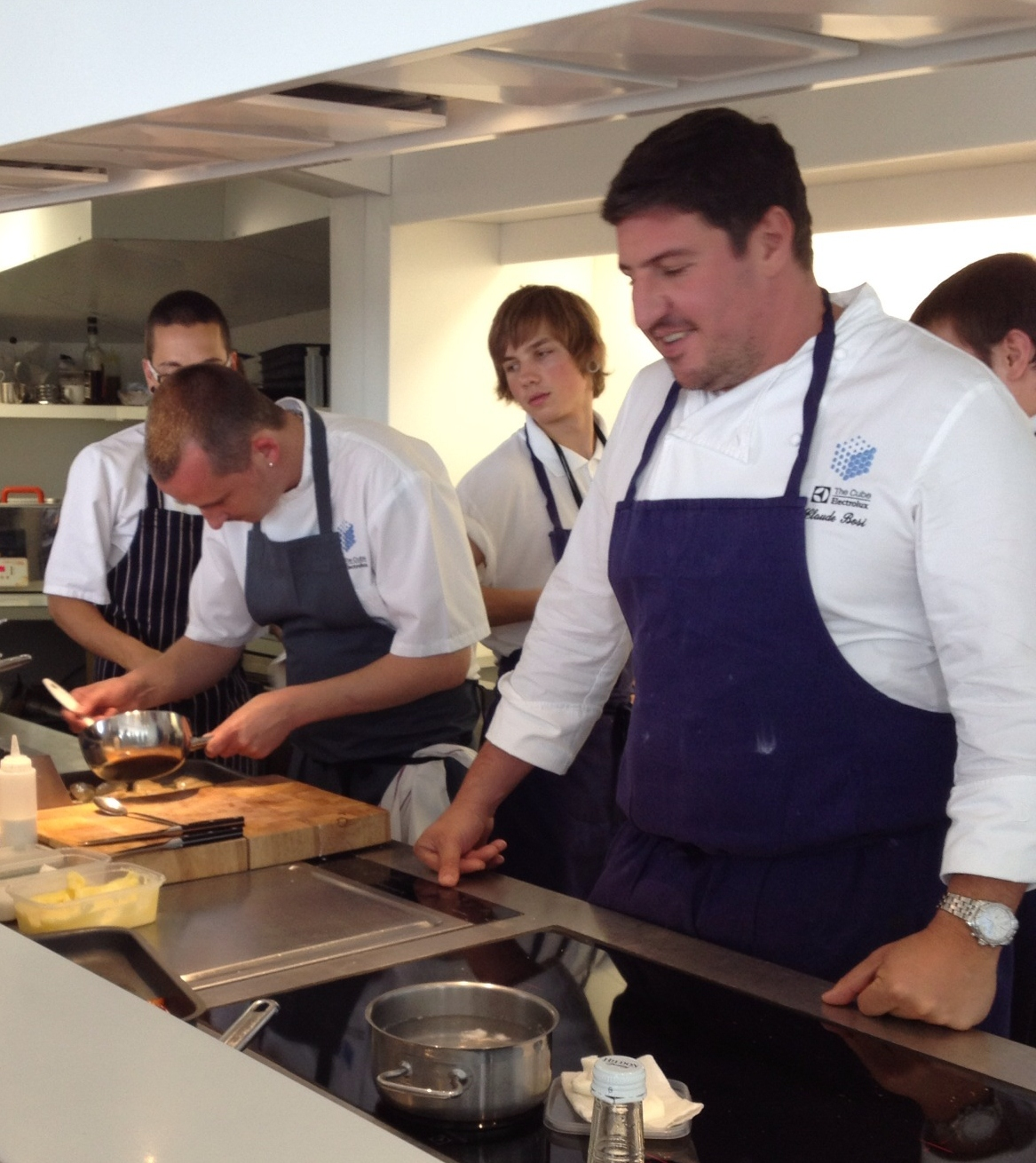
Claude Bosi, at The Cube in London

The Cube was designed by Park Associati design studio in Milan, and the construction covers a space of 140 m^{2}. It has an outside balcony allowing for a 360-degree field of vision. The exterior shell is made of aluminium and has hexagonal shapes cut into the shell by laser in order to allow light into the interior. The pop-up restaurant acts as a promotional device for home appliance manufacturer Electrolux, and the restaurant is fitted out with their equipment.

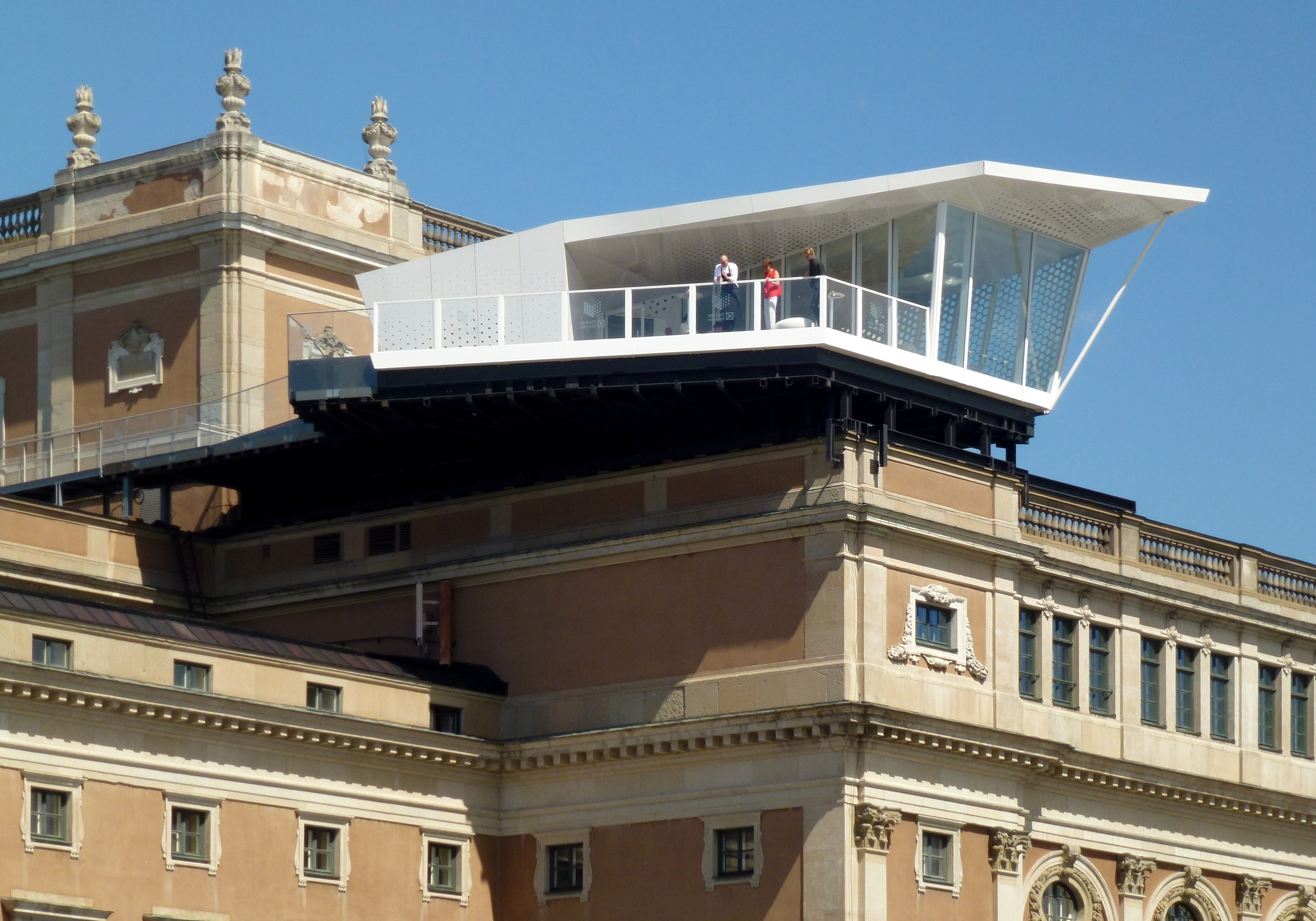
"The Cube" on Royal Swedish Opera

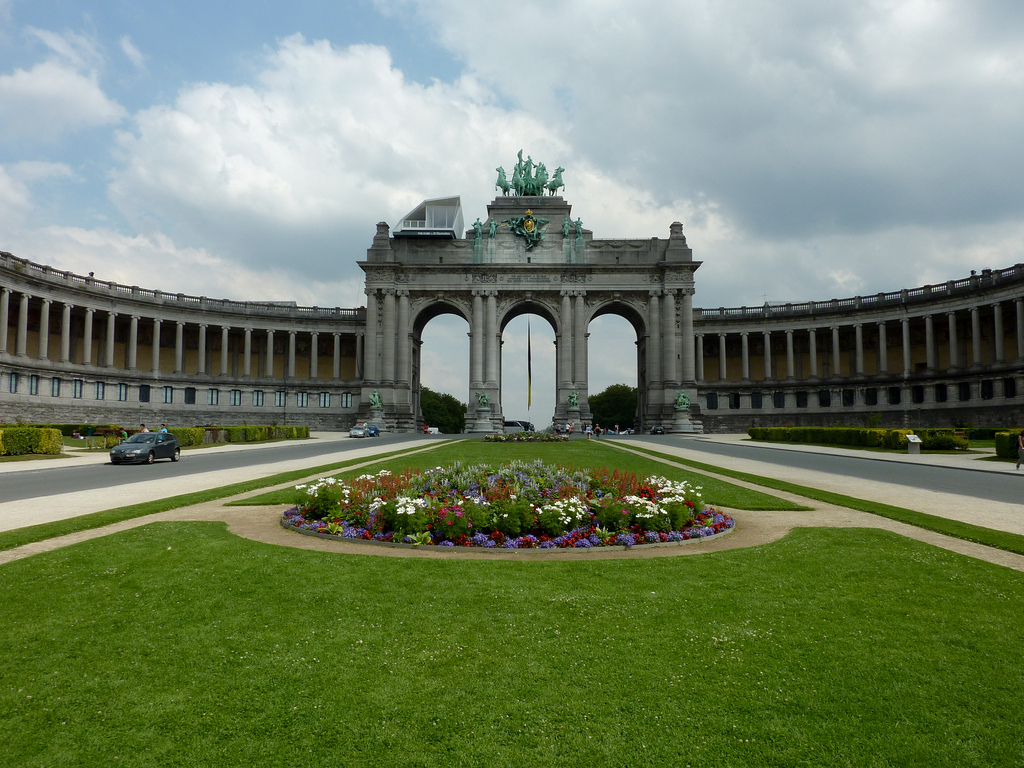
"The Cube" on the Cinquantenaire in Brussels

Two copies of The Cube were made, and they both tour Europe in a different city each year. During 2011, versions of the restaurant visited Milan and Brussels, while in 2012 they are in London and Stockholm. The restaurant proved so popular in London that it was announced in September 2012 that the restaurant would stay in the city until 31 January 2013. There are further plans for the restaurant to visit Switzerland and Russia. In each city, the restaurant is placed on top of a monument; in Brussels it was on top of the triumphal arch at the Parc du Cinquantenaire, in Milan by the Galleria Vittorio Emanuele II, in London it is located on top of the Southbank Centre.

Celebrity chefs from those countries have been brought into the spaces in order to demonstrate the cooking they normally produce at their own restaurants. These have included Michelin star chefs such as two starred Bart De Pooter from Pastorale, Claude Bosi from Hibiscus and Daniel Clifford from Midsummer House.

== Reception ==
During its stay in London, John O'Ceallaigh of The Daily Telegraph ate at The Cube while Daniel Clifford was in residence. He thought that as a "promotional vehicle it makes much more impact than a display stand in Currys", but at the end of his meal he departed reluctantly, saying "I’m not usually a fan of corporate pop-ups but, for those who can afford it, Electrolux has created something special." Lisa Markwell for The Independent whilst Sat Bains was cooking and described the space as "dazzling", and gave the location a score of eight out of ten.
