= Diana Marburg =

Miss Diana Marburg, also known as "The Oracle of Maddox Street", is a palmist and female occult detective created by the writers L. T. Meade and Robert Eustace. The character is unusual for Meade in that there is a supernatural aspect to her detective skills, though elements of this are taken from the authors' character John Bell in The Master of Mysteries. Diana Marburg first appeared in the New York edition of Pearson's Magazine in February 1902, in a story entitled 'The Dead Hand'. Two further stories were published: 'Finger Tips' (August 1902) and 'Sir Penn Caryll's Engagement' (December 1902). The stories were published in book form along with seven non-Marburg stories in The Oracle of Maddox Street (Ward, Lock & Co., 1904).

The Marburg stories have since featured in a number of anthologies.

The author Scott Dickerson has written three further adventures of Miss Marburg, narrated by her brother Rupert, along with versions of the originals, though with changed titles, published in his The Oracular Miss Marburg. The book is only available as a Kindle edition. One of the new stories features the scientist Sir William Crookes and the bogus medium Florence Cook, both historical characters, and another features Arthur Conan Doyle and Harry Houdini.
