= L'Ortolan =

Coordinates: 51.4089°N 0.9541°W

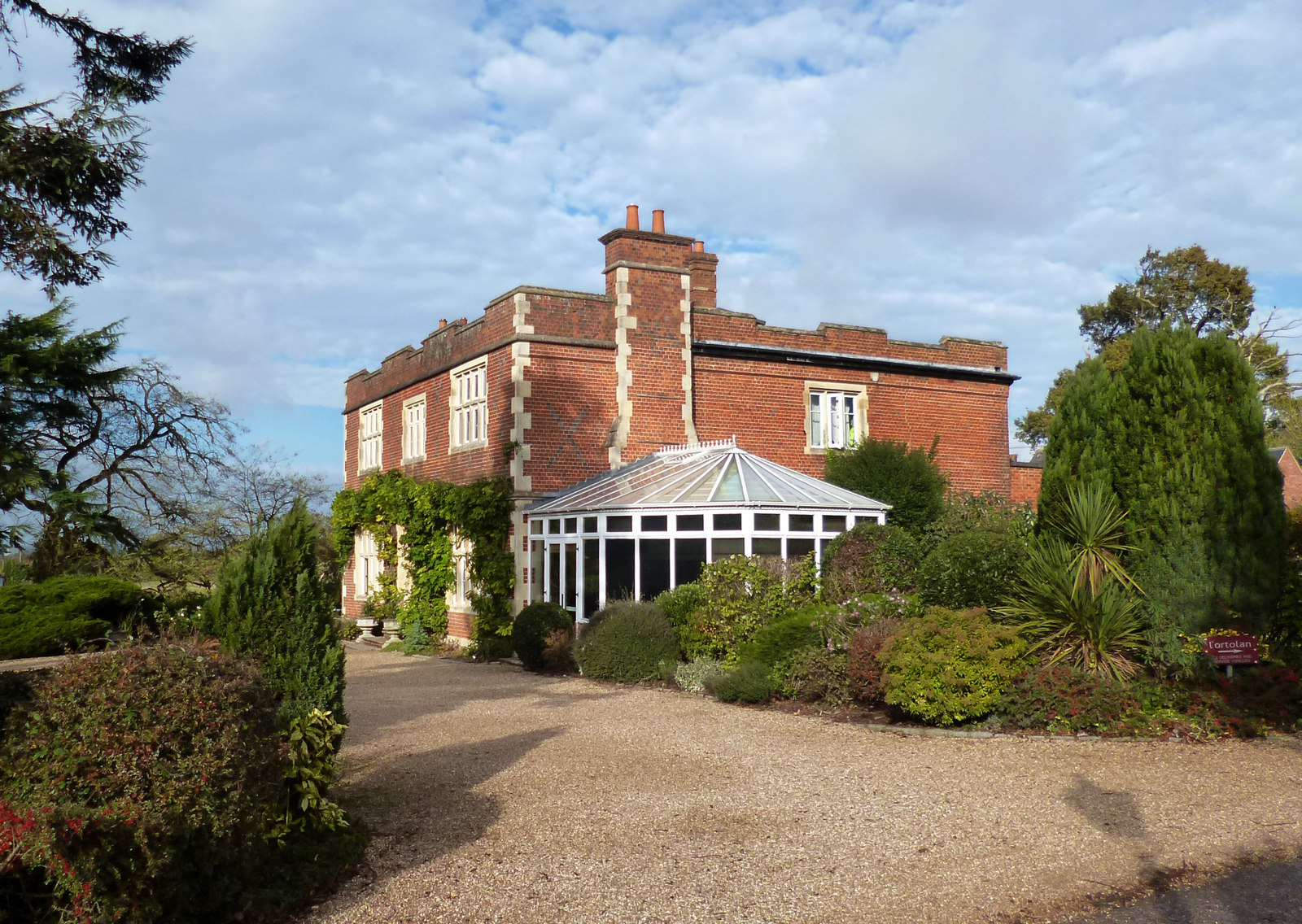
- L'Ortolan in 2013
- Interactive map of L'Ortolan

Restaurant information
- Established: 1986; 40 years ago
- Closed: 2024; 2 years ago
- Location: Shinfield, Reading, Berkshire, England
- Website: www.lortolan.com

L'Ortolan was a gourmet restaurant in the village of Shinfield, 6 km (4 mi) south of the centre of Reading, Berkshire, England. The restaurant closed its doors for the final time in August 2024. It was located in the village's old vicarage building, which is a Grade-II listed building dating back to the 1840s. Originally a three-story structure, the building endured substantial fire damage during World War II, resulting in the loss of its top floor.

The building was first opened as a restaurant by chef Richard Sandford in 1978, when it was known as Milton Sandford, winning a Michelin star in 1982. It was then purchased by Nico Ladenis, who left the restaurant he renamed as Chez Nico, less than a year later in 1986. A few months later, John Burton-Race opened the restaurant, calling it L'Ortolan and he was awarded two Michelin stars in 1988

Run by John Burton-Race for 13 years, the restaurant was purchased by Peter Newman in 2000, who appointed Alan Murchison as head chef.

Murchison left the restaurant in 2003, and Daniel Galmiche took over for a year. Alan Murchison returned in 2004 as executive head chef with the option to buy the restaurant. Murchison left in 2014, and Peter Newman took over the running of the restaurant. James Greatorex took over as head chef in 2020, serving till June 2024, when Jamie Pierce was appointed in the position. However, the restaurant announced its closure just a month after Pierce's appointment, and closed its doors for good in August 2024.

The restaurant had held a Michelin star from 2003 until 2022 when the award was rescinded, and had three AA rosettes in 2023.
