= Alfred Pizzey Newton =

English watercolour painter

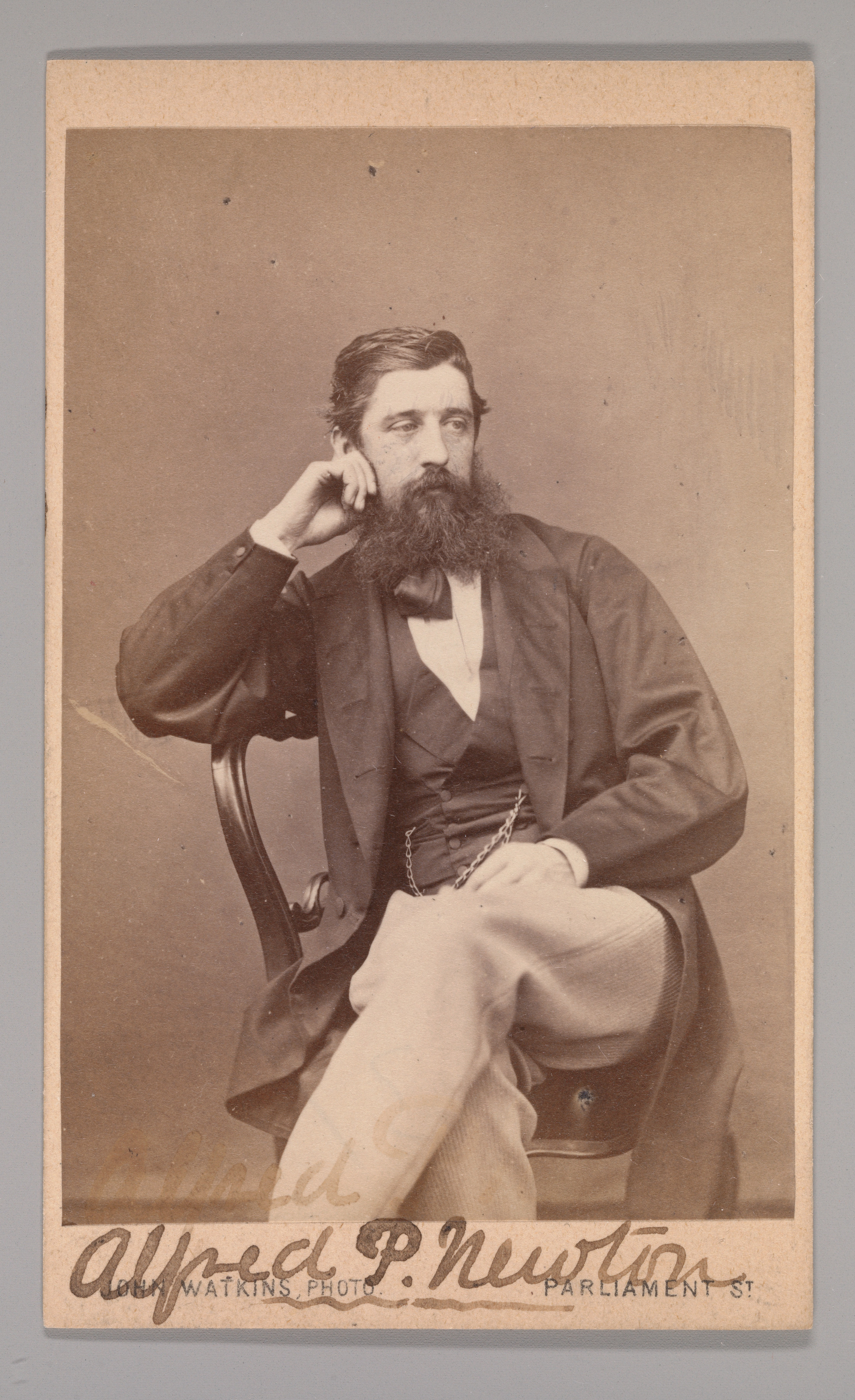
Alfred Pizzey Newton (1860s)

Alfred Pizzey or Pizzi Newton, RWS (1830 – 1883) was an English watercolour painter.

== Life ==
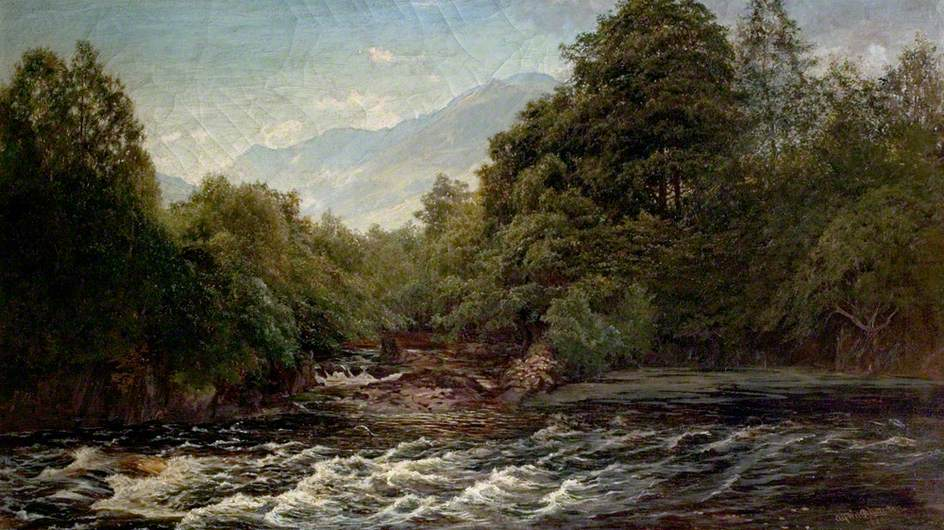
The Salmon Pool (1880)

Alfred Pizzey Newton, born in 1830, was a native of Rayleigh, Essex, but, through his mother, of Italian descent. Newton became interested in art when he moved to London at the age of fifteen and was apprenticed to Messrs Dickenson, a firm of print-sellers and publishers in Bond Street. He subsequently studied watercolour and opened a studio in Maddox Street for pupils during the London season.

Newton's earliest works were painted in the western Highlands of Scotland, and, as he happened to be painting the scenery near Inverlochy Castle, which was then occupied by Queen Victoria, he obtained her patronage. She selected him to paint a picture as a wedding gift to the Princess Royal in January 1858, and he also contributed some sketches in the area around Inverlochy Castle in Inverness-shire for the royal album of drawings.

He exhibited a few pictures at the Royal Academy in 1855 and the following years, and on 1 March 1858 he was elected an associate of the "Old" Society of Painters in Water-colours. From this time he was a constant and prolific contributor to their exhibitions, though he did not attain full membership until 24 March 1879; in all, he exhibited 249 drawings with the society and five with the Royal Academy.

Most of Newton's works were atmospheric highland scenes showing effects of light and weather. A winter scene, Mountain Gloom, painted in the Pass of Glencoe under trying circumstances, attracted notice in 1860: it was said that in the severe winter he continued with his drawing despite a frost so intense that he was forced to mix his colours with pure whisky instead of water. This picture was afterwards sent to the Philadelphia exhibition, where Newton was awarded a diploma of merit.

In 1862 Newton visited the Riviera and Italy, finding there many subjects for his later pictures. In 1880 his picture of The Mountain Pass was much commended. In 1882, though in failing health, Newton visited Athens, painting there, among other pictures, one called Shattered Desolation.

Newton married Jessie, the second daughter of Edward Wylie of Rock Ferry, Birkenhead, on 28 April 1864, and by her had five children. He died at his father-in-law's house at 14 Rock Park, Rock Ferry, Birkenhead, on 9 September 1883, aged fifty-three. A portrait of him appeared in the Illustrated London News on 27 October 1883.
