= Alligator Rainwear =

British company

Alligator
- Industry: Fashion
- Founder: Reuben Satinoff
- Products: "Wet look" PVC raincoats
- Parent: Baker Street Brands

Alligator Rainwear was a British company, whose main factory was based in Stockport. It was best known for its 1960s collaborations with Mary Quant in the design and production of her "Wet Look" collection of PVC raincoats.

The firm was started after the First World War by Reuben Satinoff, who had previously founded the London Waterproof Company (Silkimac). It was taken over by his sons after the Second World War. For decades, it manufactured traditional weatherproof raincoats in black, brown and beige, but the collaboration with Quant led to new fabrics including PVC and nylon, and a range of bright and vibrant colours.

At its peak in the 1960s and 1970s, Alligator had a turnover of £5 million per year and was exporting its products to Europe and North America. It was later owned by Baker Street Brands who describe it as one of their "heritage brands".

== Early history ==
After the First World War, Reuben Satinoff moved from the United States to the UK, and founded the London Waterproof Company (Silkimac) and soon afterwards created Alligator Rainwear as a subsidiary. Alligator Mill opened in the 1930s, and was a six-storey building in Portwood, just to the east of Stockport town centre. Its trading office was based in Maddox Street, London. After the Second World War, his sons, Harry and William "Willie" Satinoff took over production. Alligator eventually had four factories in the UK: London, Manchester, Leeds and the mill at Stockport, as its main base.

In 1952, both the American "Alligator Company", who had used the "Alligator" trademark since 1908, and the London Waterproof Company (Silkimac), who had used the "Alligator" trademark since 1932 and popularised it in the UK further since 1948, applied for the trademark "Alligator" in the UK.

Willie Satinoff was a keen football fan and friend of Matt Busby, and died in the Munich air disaster on 6 February 1958.

== Association with Mary Quant ==
Disco in ICI Terylene and cotton, designed by Mary Quant for Alligator

Before working with Mary Quant, Alligator had already collaborated with Pierre Balmain and Pierre Cardin.

In April 1963, Mary Quant launched her "Wet Collection", her first collection of PVC raincoats. It led to her first magazine cover for British Vogue. However, the seams easily split and rip when passed through an ordinary sewing machine. In 1965 she sought the assistance of Alligator who were able to use their knowledge to successfully join the seams and secure the plastic clothing. The collaboration with Alligator led to the production of Quant's vinyl ankle boots with her daisy logo footprints and a range of Mary Quant PVC raincoats which could be available commercially.

For decades, Alligator had manufactured traditional weatherproof raincoats in black, brown and beige, but the arrangement with Quant led to the use of new materials such as PVC and nylon, in a range of bright and vibrant colours. Jill Kennington was photographed by John Cowan in a white PVC Quant/Alligator rain tunic and hat for the Sunday Times in 1963.

== Later history ==
At its peak in the 1960s and 1970s, Alligator had a turnover of £5 million per year, concessions UK-wide in House of Fraser and Debenhams department stores, and was exporting its products to Europe and North America. The headquarters at Stockport was located at Richard Street, with a large "Alligator" sign seen from miles away. Advertising, marketing and sales were led by Norman Satinoff.

Alligator is now owned by Baker Street Brands, and produces rainwear, clothing and luggage, described as one of their "heritage brands". In 2011, Baker Street Clothing won a four-year legal case against Lacoste, who argued that people would confuse the trademark Alligator with their crocodile logo. By 2013, the Stockport mill had been demolished, and the site is now occupied by a Tesco supermarket and part of the M60 motorway.
