= The Sorceress of the Strand =

Short story series

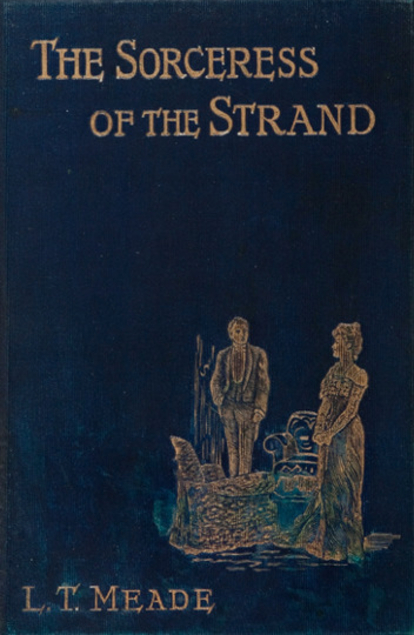
- Author: L.T. Meade and Robert Eustace
- Language: English
- Genre: Detective fiction
- Published: 1903
- Publisher: Ward Lock & Co, Ltd.
- Publication place: United Kingdom
- Media type: Print (hardback)
- Text: The Sorceress of the Strand at Wikisource

The Sorceress of the Strand, written by L. T. Meade and co-written by Robert Eustace, is a collection of periodical mystery stories that appeared in The Strand magazine from 1902 to 1903. These stories are crime fiction, similar to the stories of Sherlock Holmes which also appeared in The Strand. They feature the criminal genius villain, Madame Sara, and tell stories of medical mysteries, dangerous criminal women, and explored themes related to gender and consumerism. Elizabeth Carolyn Miller argued that the character of Madame Sara was inspired by the real life Victorian criminal Madame Rachel.

== Publication ==
L.T. Meade and Robert Eustace would publish six stories featuring the Madame Sara character between October 1902 and March 1903. These were published in monthly instalments of The Strand. The stories were all eventually collected in The Sorceress of the Strand (1903). These stories included:

- Madame Sara (October 1902)
- The Blood-Red Cross (November 1902)
- The Face of the Abbot (December 1902)
- The Talk of the Town (January 1903)
- The Bloodstone (February 1903)
- The Teeth of the Wolf (March 1903)

An edited collection of these stories was published by Broadview Press in 2016.

== Contents ==
The stories all concern the efforts of Eric Vandeleur, the Police Surgeon of the Westminster area of London, to investigate the eponymous Madame Sara. The stories are narrated by Vandeleur's assistant Dixon Druce, echoing the contemporary Sherlock Holmes stories. Madame Sara herself is portrayed as being ambiguously foreign and well-travelled, having Indian and Italian parentage. She is described in the first story in the sequence, Madame Sara, as "a professional beautifier. She claims the privilege of restoring youth to those who consult her. She also declares that she can make quite ugly people handsome."

Many of the stories involve the use of poisons. In The Talk of the Town, for example, Madame Sara attempts to kill the scientist Professor Piozzi with an alkaloid and carbon monoxide. Throughout the stories, Eric Vandeleur is unable to arrest Madame Sara despite his best efforts.

== Themes ==
The stories comment on the anxieties and fears of the Edwardian reading public. Madame Sara, an intelligent and successful woman of ambiguous ethnicity, embodies fears of both women and the Other. Her role as a beautician and cosmetologist also highlights the fear of modern medical science present in Edwardian England. Her clinic is depicted as a strange and sinister place, full of alarming medical instruments that reflect contemporary anxieties towards chloroform and anaesthesia. Subtextually, it is implied that women practising medicine is a source of threat. It has been argued that Madame Sara is a fictional recreation of Sarah Rachel Russell, otherwise known as 'Madame Rachel', who was similarly a charlatan whose medicine promised her customers youth and attractiveness.

One story in the sequence, The Blood-Red Cross, features Madame Sara staining a woman’s neck with a cross as evidence of her guilt. Christopher Pittard has argued that this can be read as a parody of determinist criminology, wherein the forensic evidence of the crime is artificially administered by the "detective" figure. The story highlights the theme of purity versus criminal corruption throughout the story, with the eponymous blood-red cross being a literalised stain of dishonour.
