= Daniel Clifford (chef) =

British chef

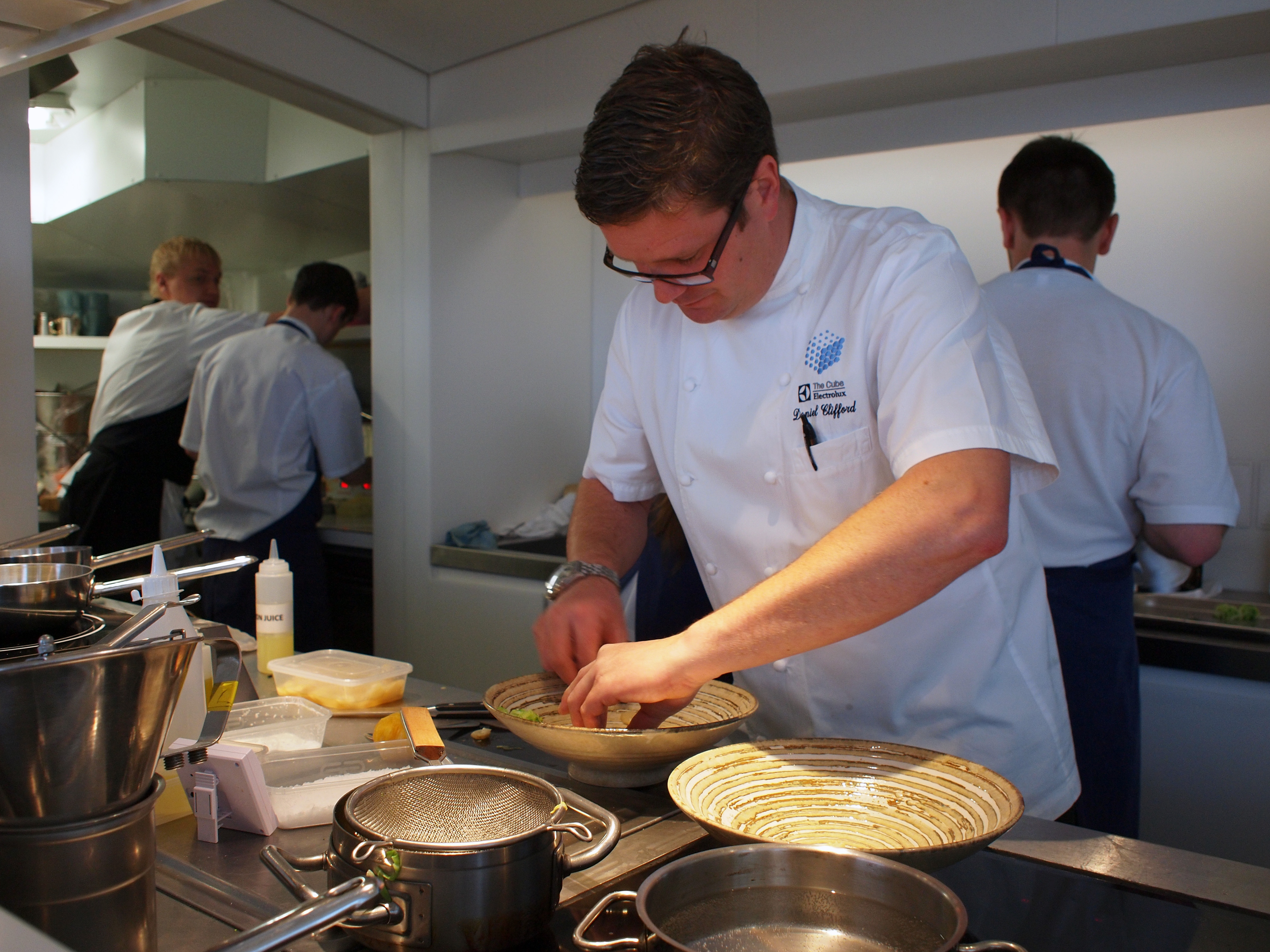
- Clifford at The Cube in 2012
- Born: 6 August 1973 (age 52); Canterbury, Kent
- Education: Canterbury High School
- Spouse: Alice Clifford
- Children: 5
- Culinary career
- Cooking style: French/British
- Rating(s): Michelin stars AA Rosettes
- Current restaurant: Midsummer House
- Previous restaurant: The Flitch of Bacon (no longer held)
- Television show: BBC2 Great British Menu
- Award(s) won: Winner of Great British Menu for 2012 and 2013 Chefs Chef of the Year award for 2015/2016 AA awards

Daniel Clifford (born 6 August 1973) is an English chef who is best known for his work at the two Michelin star restaurant Midsummer House. He was also named one of the winners of the 2012 and 2013 series of the BBC television show the Great British Menu. He was chef patron of a gastro pub in Little Dunmow, Essex, named The Flitch of Bacon, which held one Michelin star from 2018 to 2021. Daniel is married to his wife Alice and has five daughters and two stepsons.

== Early life ==
Clifford was born 6 August 1973 in Canterbury, Kent. His father is Tony Clifford and his mother is Denise Clifford, née Wynn. He attended Canterbury High School.

== Career ==
Clifford was first employed in a restaurant in 1989 as a commis chef at the Howfield Manor Hotel in his home town of Canterbury, Kent. He moved in 1992 to become the first commis chef at The Bell Inn in Aston Clinton, and became a demi-chef de partie at Marco Pierre White's Box Tree through 1993. He was chef de partie at Millers in Harrogate, sous chef at Provence Restaurant in Hordle, and chef de partie at Jean Bardet Restaurant in Tours. He became a senior sous chef at Rascasse in Leeds in 1996, where he worked until being named head chef of his restaurant Midsummer House in 1998.

Clifford was awarded his second Michelin star at Midsummer House in the 2005 list. It was the only new restaurant to earn a second Michelin star that year, and became one of eleven restaurants in the UK and Ireland to be at that level of the Michelin Guide's scheme.

He opened a gastropub called "The Headley" in Great Warley, Essex, in May 2007. He acted as chef patron to the new venture, and hired Scott Wade as head chef to take charge of the day-to-day running of the pub to enable Clifford to continue working at Midsummer House.

His main course of chicken and a sweetcorn egg accompanied by spinach with bacon and peas was the winning main course for the banquet in the 2012 series of the BBC television show the Great British Menu. He sees his television work as a good source of publicity, but prefers to concentrate on working in the kitchen. He was also one of a number of chefs scheduled to cook at a pop-up restaurant entitled The Cube on London's South Bank during the summer in 2012.

On 5 October 2015 Clifford was awarded the Chefs Chef of the Year at the 2015/16 AA awards held at the Grosvenor House Hotel. He was praised for turning Midsummer House into one of the country's finest restaurants, while being an "inspiration to so many chefs at all levels".

As of 2020, Daniel Clifford changed the menu at his restaurant, removing all plant-based options and ceasing to cater but for a handful of dietary restrictions. The chef said this would allow his team to work more efficiently, and focus on executing dishes to perfection.

In 2021, the chef was a co-host on The Staff Canteen's Grilled podcast. In one episode featuring his fellow Great British Menu contestant, chef owner of Michelin-starred Loch Bay Restaurant on the Isle of Skye, Michael Smith, the chefs discussed the price of fine-dining food, arguing that the cost of ingredients and staff justifies the high cost. Comparatively, he said that a meal at Salt Bae's London restaurant, Nusr-Et, where it costs £630 for a steak, is not good value for money, calling chef and restaurateur Nusret Gökçe 'Mickey Mouse.'

== Influences ==
He credits Heston Blumenthal and Ferran Adrià as influences, and experiments with molecular gastronomy, leading to his restaurant Midsummer House being nicknamed "The Fat Duckling" after Blumenthal's The Fat Duck. He also forages for ingredients.

He also credits his time spent in France with chef Jean Bardet as teaching him the value of quality ingredients, and seeing foie gras in a different light.
