= The Documents in the Case =

1930 mystery novel by Dorothy Sayers and Robert Eustace

- First US edition
- Author: Dorothy L. Sayers and Robert Eustace
- Language: English
- Genre: Mystery Epistolary novel
- Publisher: Ernest Benn (UK); Brewer and Warren (US)
- Publication date: 1930
- Publication place: United Kingdom
- Media type: Print (Hardcover, Paperback)
- ISBN: 978-0-450-00243-4
- OCLC: 60267830

The Documents in the Case is a 1930 novel by Dorothy L. Sayers and Robert Eustace. It is the only one of Sayers's twelve major crime novels not to feature Lord Peter Wimsey, her most famous detective character. However, the forensic analyst Sir James Lubbock, who appears or is mentioned in several of the Wimsey novels, also appears in The Documents in the Case.

== Plot ==
This is an epistolary novel, told primarily in the form of letters between some of the characters, using the multiple narrative technique associated with Modernist novelists of the period. This collection of documents—hence the novel's title—is explained as a dossier of evidence collected by the victim's son as part of his campaign to obtain justice for his father.

Novelist John Munting shares, with former public school contemporary and talented painter Harwood Lathom, a rented top floor flat in respectably suburban Bayswater, London. The landlord and downstairs neighbour, Harrison, is a staid, middle-aged widower who has remarried. His new wife Margaret is younger, attractive, passionate and self-absorbed. Lathom and Mrs Harrison begin an affair, the husband suspecting nothing, and Lathom paints a remarkable portrait of her.

Creeping downstairs to meet his mistress one night, Lathom encounters the Harrisons' neurotic live-in spinster companion, Agatha Milsom, who mistakes him for Munting in the dark and makes accusations of assault. Faced with Harrison's furious reaction and glad of an excuse to leave a distasteful situation, Munting moves out and marries his fiancée. Lathom departs for Paris and his portrait of Mrs Harrison, exhibited at the Royal Academy, makes his reputation on the London art scene.

Meeting Lathom by chance some time later, Munting is persuaded to accompany Lathom to a remote Devonshire cottage where he is holidaying with Harrison, who is pursuing his hobby of cooking with ingredients available in the wild, and is an expert on edible mushrooms. On arrival they find Harrison hideously dead, apparently having cooked and eaten poisonous fungi by mistake.

Returning from Africa, Harrison's engineer son Paul suspects that Lathom and his stepmother have conspired to murder Harrison, and Munting is drawn unwillingly into the investigation. He learns that muscarine – the poison that killed Harrison – in its natural state, differs from synthetic muscarine: all molecules of muscarine are asymmetrical, and differ from their mirror image. Natural muscarine, found in mushrooms, consists purely of one of the two possible forms, but synthetic muscarine is racemic, which means that it consists of a mixture of equal quantities of the molecule as found in nature and its artificial "mirror-image" form. The two types of muscarine can be distinguished by using polarized light: when linearly polarized light is shone through a solution of the racemic mixture, the direction of polarization does not change, but when the same linearly polarized light passes through a solution consisting of only one form of muscarine (or of any such asymmetrical molecule), the direction of polarization rotates as the light passes through the solution.

The muscarine consumed by Harrison proves to be synthetic, indicating that the mushrooms he ate were poisoned deliberately by addition of synthetic muscarine stolen from a laboratory. Letters between Mrs Harrison and Lathom indicate that she manipulated him into the killing by claiming that she was expecting his child. Lathom is hanged for murder.

== Characters in "The Documents in the Case" ==
- John Munting – an aspiring young writer
- Harwood Lathom – a struggling artist, acquaintance of Munting
- George Harrison – middle-aged downstairs neighbour of Lathom and Munting
- Margaret Harrison – considerably younger than her husband. Engaged in a secret affair with Lathom
- Agatha Milsom – live-in spinster companion of Mrs Harrison
- Paul Harrison – engineer; adult son of Mr Harrison by a previous marriage.

== Themes and sources ==
Dorothy Sayers' co-author, under the pseudonym of Robert Eustace, was Dr Eustace Barton, a physician who also wrote medico-legal thrillers. Barton suggested to Sayers the scientific theme crucial to the novel's dénouement, which concerns the difference between a naturally produced organic compound and the corresponding synthetic material, and the use of the polariscope to distinguish between them. He travelled to University College Hospital in August 1928 to consult colleagues and see a practical demonstration of the effect.

As a practising Christian, Sayers was pleased with the religious-scientific theme offered to her by Eustace, which was based on the idea that the asymmetry of living molecules was an indication of the hand of God in creation.

"[The idea] touches the very key note of the mystery of the appearance of Life on this planet. There seems no escape from the conclusion that at some wonderful moment in the evolutionary process a Directive Force-From-Without entered upon the scene of Life itself."

— Dorothy L Sayers, Dorothy L Sayers: Her Life and Soul. Barbara Reynolds, Hodder & Stoughton 1993, chapter 15

This point is made very clear in the lengthy exposition at the local vicar's dinner party, where Munting follows a wide-ranging debate about religion, science and the origin of life. A keen choral singer in her Oxford University years, Sayers introduces at this point the key theme of Haydn's oratorio The Creation.

Having established herself as a successful writer, Sayers intended this book as a departure or experiment, away from the conventional detective story towards the crime novel. In her previous novel Strong Poison she had introduced the character of the crime novelist Harriet Vane as the love interest of her popular amateur sleuth Lord Peter Wimsey, and now she omitted Wimsey altogether in a very differently structured and conceived crime novel.

The novel clearly draws upon the notable 1922 Edith Thompson and Frederick Bywaters case, which led to the miscarriage of justice whereby Edith Thompson was hanged, along with her lover Frederick Bywaters, for his murder of her husband, supposedly at her instigation, thanks to her fancifully passionate letters offered in evidence at their joint trial. Sayers' presentation of Margaret Harrison (and her letters) in the novel makes an interesting contrast with F. Tennyson Jesse's 1934 novel A Pin to See the Peepshow, similarly based on the Thompson/Bywaters case. Tennyson Jesse's Julia Almond is presented very differently from Sayers' Margaret Harrison.

However, she was ultimately disappointed with the way the book turned out. "In my heart," she wrote, "I know I have made a failure of it... I wish I could have done better with the brilliant plot.".

== Publication history ==
- 1930, Victor Gollancz, Hardback
