= Daniel Galmiche =

French chef

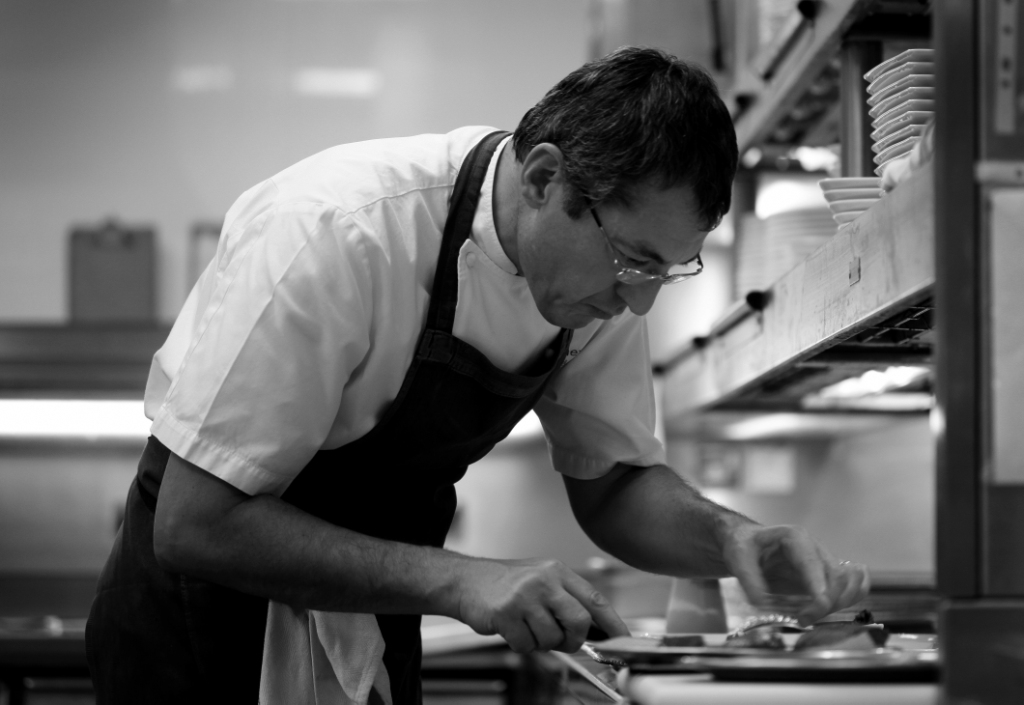
- Chef Daniel Galmiche
- Born: 18 June 1958 (age 68); Lure, Haute-Saône, France
- Culinary career
- Rating: Michelin star (1990)
- Website: danielgalmiche.co.uk

Daniel Galmiche (born 18 June 1958 in Lure Haute-Saône, France) is a French chef. He has been a Michelin-starred chef since 1990. His light and colorful cooking is permeated with north–south mixtures thanks to his European and Asiatic career. According to him, cooking is done with eco-friendly and healthy products, it needs to be shared. He has written in magazines and English newspapers, published books and hosted cooking shows on the BBC.

== Biography ==
Daniel Galmiche loves cooking since its earliest years. This love appeared through healthy and natural products from his grandparents’ farm, from hunting with his father as well as fragrances from his mother cooking. He apprenticed at the gourmet restaurant of Chef Yves Lalloz, Luxeuil-les-Bains. He improved his work in La Napoule, in the south of France then abroad in Sweden, Singapore and Portugal.

== Career ==
In 1977, Daniel Galmiche practised in London with the help of the great French chef Michel Roux. He was elected Chef of the 1987–1988 season in Scotland.

During the 1989–1990 season, he got the Michelin star at Knockinaam Lodge Hotel.

He joined the Harveys Bristol Restaurant in 1996 and the Ortolan in 2002, where he both maintains the Michelin-starred title.

Two years later, he was the Great Chef at Cliveden House, and won again the Michelin Star in 2006. Then it's the Eden and Le Cerise Forbury in 2008 followed the next year by the Vineyard stockcross always as Grand Chef.

He is a member and judge Bailiwick of Great Britain in 2010 of Confrérie de la chaîne des rôtisseurs.

He won the Rising Chef Trophy in 2010-2011 and travels the world : Mauritius, Abu Dhabi, Malta, Dubai, where he prepares gourmet dinners prestige.

Parallel to these activities and true to his roots, he is involved in the defense of ecology and healthy products as a regular juror of The Soil Association Organic Awards, advocacy group for environmentally friendly products and respect for animals

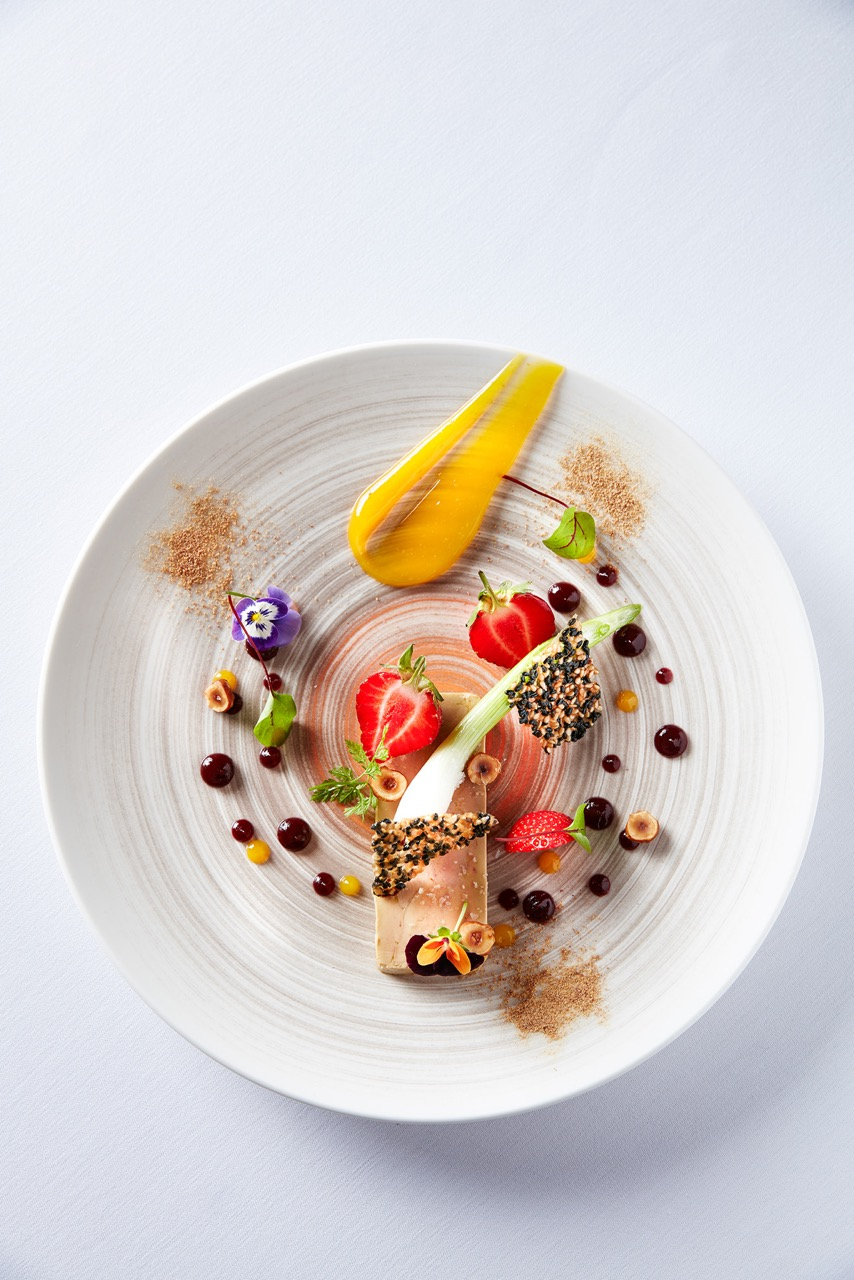
Chicken liver pâté, strawberries, sesame nougatine and hazelnut.

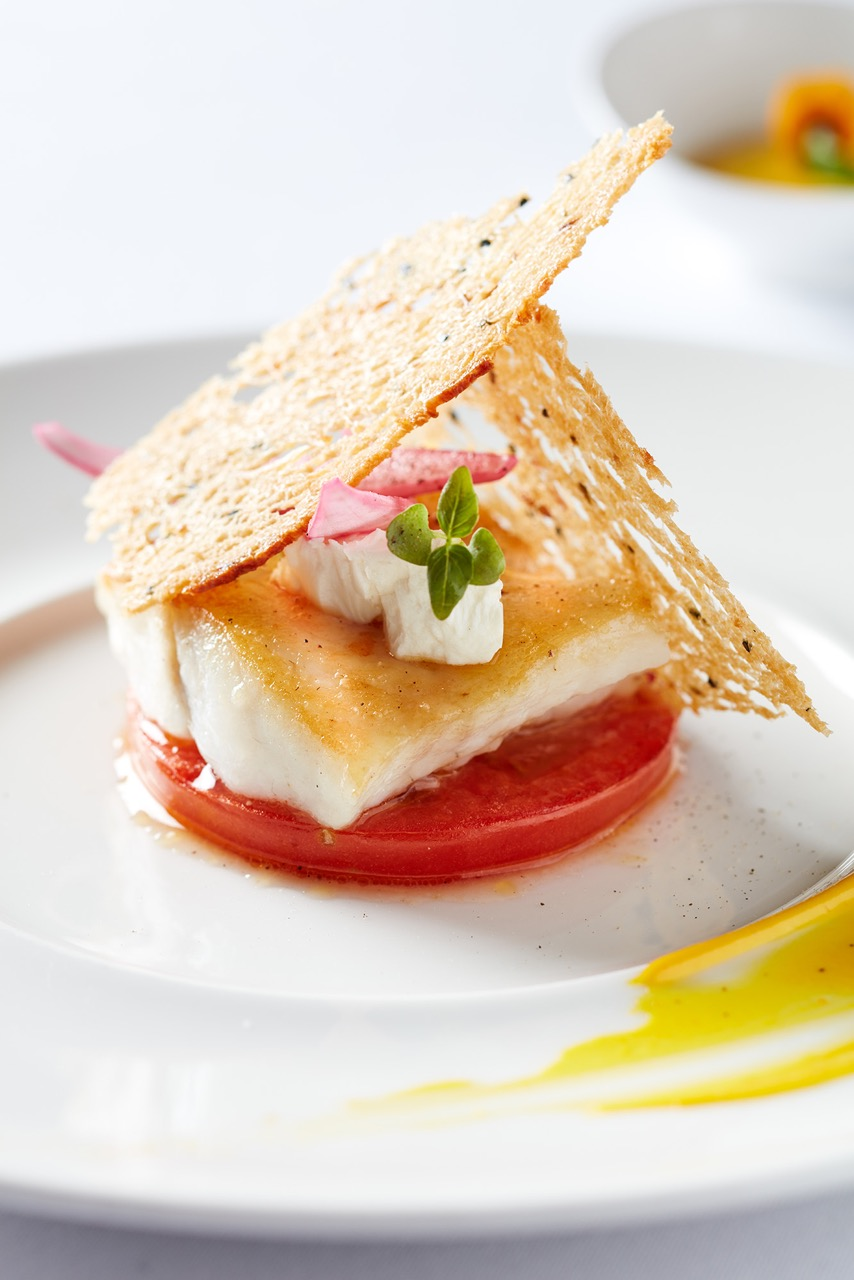
Pan roasted wild Norwegian halibut, tomato confit, feta, rosemary bread crisp, and aioli.

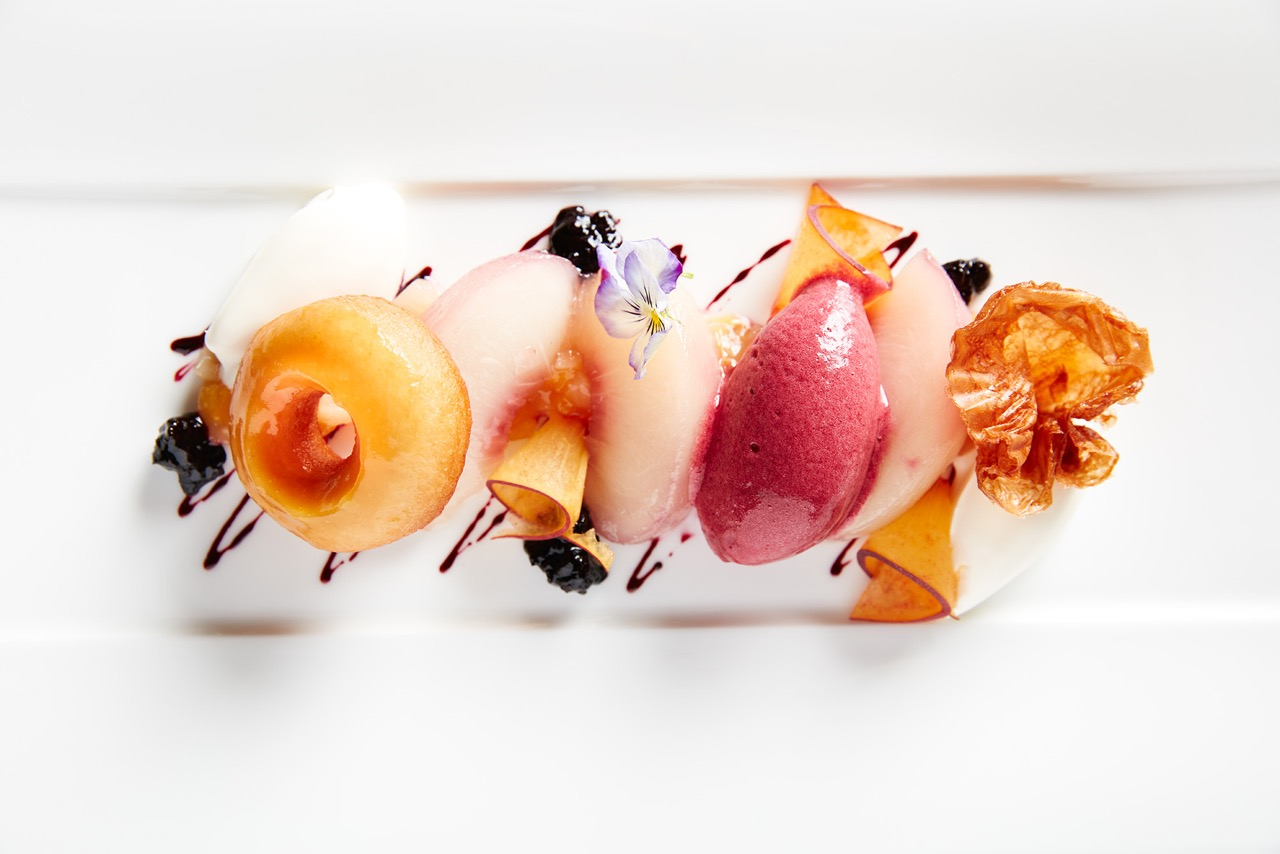
Poach peach with nectarine, doughnut and peach cassis sorbet.

== Works ==
=== Bibliography ===
- French Brasserie Cookbook : The Heart of French Home Cooking. Duncan Baird Publishers. 2012. ASIN B00CF6FMXM.
- Het Franse brasserie kookboek (in Dutch). Kosmos. 2012. ISBN 978-9021550879.
- A Autêntica Culinária Francesa (in Portuguese). Translated by A Autêntica Culinária Francesa. Brasil: Publifolha Editora. 2012. ISBN 978-8579143380.
- Recettes de brasserie : Un savoir-faire à la française (in French). Translated by A Autêntica Culinária Francesa. France Gennevilliers: Prisma. 2013. ISBN 978-2810404148.
- Collective (2013). Saturday Kitchen Cooking Bible: 200 Delicious Recipes Cooked in the Nation's Favourite Kitchen. Oxford England: Weidenfeld & Nicolson. ISBN 978-0297869108.
- Revolutionary French Cooking. Oxford England: Duncan Baird Publishers. 2014. ISBN 978-1-84899-067-8.
- Kochen à la Liberté (in German). Translated by Anke Albrecht. Hildesheim Germany: Gerstenberg Verlag. 2014. ISBN 9783836920995.

=== Broadcasts BBC ===
- BBC One Saturday Kitchen 2008-2009
- BBC Radio Berkshire 2011
- BBC Saturday Kitchen recipes 2013
- BBC One Christmas Kitchen 2012-2013
