= La Bécasse =

Coordinates: 52.3702°N 2.7190°W

- Interactive map of La Bécasse

Restaurant information
- Established: 2007
- Closed: 2013
- Location: Ludlow, Shropshire, England

La Bécasse was a gourmet restaurant located in Ludlow, Shropshire, England.

== Establishment ==
Chef Patron Alan Murchison opened the restaurant in 2007. The French word bécasse means woodcock but in connection with Guy de Maupassant's "Tales of the Woodcock" (1883) has usually been translated "Tales of the Goose."

Within four months of launching, La Bécasse was voted "Best Fine Dining Restaurant" in the West Midlands by the Metro. Will Holland, head chef, featured on BBC1 television's Saturday Kitchen in summer 2009, as well as MasterChef: The Professionals in 2010.

The restaurant had one Michelin star in the Michelin Guide and 3 AA rosettes. It was first given a Michelin star in January 2009.

== Recent history ==
Will Holland left the restaurant in September 2013 just weeks before the business went into voluntary liquidation. It was immediately resurrected by a newly formed company called Ludlow Restaurants Limited and the restaurant ran as before. It was however un-rated by the AA and no longer had its previously-held Michelin rating.

=== Closure ===
In January 2015 the restaurant went into liquidation for a second time and closed for good.

=== Elsewhere in Ludlow ===
Ludlow had one remaining Michelin-starred establishment — Mr Underhills which shut in December 2015. (The town had at one point boasted three Michelin-starred establishments, but all are now gone.)
