= L. T. Meade =

Irish writer, editor (1844–1914)

Elizabeth Thomasina Meade Smith
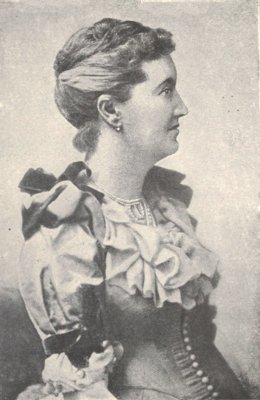
- Photo portrait, 1912
- Born: 1844; Bandon, County Cork, Munster, Ireland
- Died: 1914 (aged 69–70)
- Citizenship: British
- Occupations: Writer, editor
- Spouse: Alfred Toulmin Smith (m. 1879)
- Writing career
- Pen name: L. T. Meade
- Period: 19th century
- Genres: Children's literature, mystery

Elizabeth Thomasina Meade Smith (1844–1914), writing under the pseudonym L. T. Meade, was a prolific writer of girls' stories, also an editor. From County Cork in Ireland, she began writing in her teens.

== Early life ==
She was born in Bandon, County Cork, Ireland, daughter of Rev. R. T. Meade, of Nohoval, County Cork. She later moved to London, where she married Alfred Toulmin Smith in September 1879.

== Writing ==
She began writing at 17 and produced over 280 books in her lifetime, being so prolific that no fewer than eleven new titles under her byline appeared in the first few years after her death.

She was primarily known for her books for young people, of which the most famous was A World of Girls, published in 1886. A World of Girls sold 37,000 copies and was highly influential on girls’ school stories of the twentieth century and contributed to the idea of New Woman. However, she also wrote "sentimental" and "sensational" stories, religious stories, historical novels, adventure, romances, and mysteries.

Meade worked with three male co-authors. The first of these was Dr. Clifford Halifax, with whom she first collaborated in 1893 and wrote six books. A year later she first teamed with Robert Eustace, and turned out eleven volumes with him. Her last co-author was Sir Robert Kennaway Douglas (her daughter's father-in-law); they produced only one book, in 1897. The Eustace partnerships are notable for two female villains, Madame Sara (in The Sorceress of the Strand) and Madame Koluchy (the mastermind of a band of gangsters, in The Brotherhood of the Seven Kings). Meade and Eustace also created the occult detective and palmist Diana Marburg ("the Oracle of Maddox Street"), who first appeared in the US edition of Pearson's Magazine in 1902.

One of her most unusual titles is Dumps; A Plain Girl (1905). She was also the editor of a popular girls' magazine, Atalanta.

Meade was a feminist and a member of the Pioneer Club. Following the death of women's-rights pioneer and Pioneer Club founder Emily Langton Massingberd (1847–1897), Meade wrote a novel in 1898 based on her life titled The Cleverest Woman in England.

== List of her works ==
=== Books for young readers ===
1. Scamp and I: A Story/Study of City Byways (1872)
2. Lettie's Last Home (1876)
3. David’s Little Lad (1877)
4. Water Lilies and Other Tales (1878)
5. The Children’s Kingdom: The Story of a Great Endeavor (1878)
6. Outcast Robin, or Your Brother and Mine: A Cry from the Great City (1878)
7. Great St. Benedict's: A Tale (1879, aka Dorothy's Story, or Great St. Benedict's)
8. Water Gipsies: A Story of Canal Life in England (1879, as ...or [The Adventures of] Tag, Rag and Bobtail 1893)
9. Dot and Her Treasures (1879)
10. Andrew Harvey's Wife (1880)
11. A Dweller in Tents (1880)
12. Mou-Setse, a Negro Hero, with The Orphan's Pilgrimage (1880)
13. Mother Herring's Chicken (1881)
14. The Children's Pilgrimage (1883)
15. Scarlet Anemones (1884, repr 1897 as ... & Ellie and Esther)
16. The Autocrat of the Nursery (1884)
17. The Angel of Love (1885)
18. A Little Silver Trumpet (1885)
19. A World of Girls: The Story of a School (1886)
20. The Palace Beautiful: A Story for Girls (1887)
21. Sweet Nancy (1887, aka ...& Two Lilies)
22. Deb and the Duchess: A Story for Girls (1888, as ...for Boys and Girls 192-)
23. Nobody's Neighbors (1888)
24. A Band of Three (1888)
25. The Golden Lady (1889)
26. Polly: A New-Fashioned Girl (1889, 1910)
27. The Little Princess of Tower Hill (1889)
28. Those Boys, a Story for All Little Fellows (189-?, 1912)
29. The Honorable Miss: The Story of an Old-Fashioned Town (2v., 1890)
30. Frances Kane's Fortune, [or] What Gold Cannot Buy (1890)
31. A Girl of the People (1890)
32. Little Trouble-the-House (1890)
33. Engaged to Be Married: A Tale of Today (1890, repr 1917 as Daughters of Today)
34. The Heart of Gold (1890)
35. Dickory Dock (1890)
36. Just a Love Story (1890, repr 1900 as The Beauforts)
37. The Beresford Prize (1890)
38. Marigold (1890)
39. Hepsy Gipsy (1891)
40. A Sweet Girl Graduate (1891, updated c. 1910 as Priscilla's Promise)
41. The Children of Wilton Chase (1891)
42. Little Mary and Other Stories (1891)
43. Bashful Fifteen (1892)
44. Jill, A Flower Girl (1892)
45. Four on an Island: A Story of Adventure (1892, aka: A Book for the Little Folks)
46. The Lady of the Forest: A Story for Girls (1892)
47. Out of the Fashion (1892)
48. A Ring of Rubies (1892)
49. Beyond the Blue Mountains (1893)
50. Betty, A School Girl (1894)
51. Red Rose and Tiger Lily; or, In a Wider World (1894)
52. Girls, New And Old (1895)
53. The House of Surprises: A Story for Girls (1896)
54. Good Luck: A Story for Girls (1896)
55. A Girl in Ten Thousand (1896, repr [date?] as ..., & My Sister Kate)
56. Playmates: A Story for Boys and Girls (1896)
57. The Merry Girls of England (1896)
58. A Little Mother to the Others (1896)
59. Wild Kitty: A School Story (1897, aka A Story of Middleton School)
60. Bad Little Hannah: A Story for Girls (1897)
61. Catalina: Art Student (1897)
62. A Handful of Silver (1897)
63. A Bunch of Cherries: A Story of Cherry Court School (1898)
64. Cave Perilous (1898)
65. The Rebellion of Lil Carrington (1898)
66. Mary Gifford, M.B./S.(1898)
67. Me and My Dolls: The Story of the Joys and Troubles of Miss Bo-Peep and Her Doll Family...[&] The Strange Adventures of Mopsy and Hans (1898)
68. A Public School Boy: A Memoir of H. S. Wristbridge (1899)
69. The Desire of Men: An Impossibility (1899)
70. The Odds and the Evens (c. 1899)
71. A Brave Poor Thing (1899)
72. The Temptation of Olive Latimer (1899)
73. Light o' the Morning: The Story of an Irish Girl (1899)
74. How Nora Crena Saved Her Own (19--)
75. The Time of Roses: A Story for Girls (1900)
76. A Lonely Puppy, & The Tambourine Girl (1890)
77. Daddy’s Girl (1900, repr 1911 as ...& Consuelo's Quest of Happiness)
78. A Big Temptation and Other Stories (1900)
79. Miss Nonentity: A Story for Girls (1900)
80. Girls of the True Blue: A School Story (1901)
81. The New Mrs. Lascelles (1901, repr 1916 as Mother Mary: A Story/Study for Girls)
82. The Cosey Corner, Or How They Kept A Farm (1901)
83. A Sister of the Red Cross: A Tale of the South African War (1901, aka A Story of Ladysmith)
84. A Very Naughty Girl (1901)
85. The Rebel of the School (1902)
86. The Girls of the Forest (1902)
87. The Squire's Little Girl (1902)
88. Drift (1902)
89. The Princess Who Gave Away All, & The Naughty One of the Family (1902)
90. Margaret (1902)
91. Queen Rose: A Girl's Story (1902)
92. The Manor School (1903)
93. Peter the Pilgrim: The Story of a Boy and His Pet Rabbit (1903)
94. The Witch Maid (1903)
95. A Gay Charmer: A Story for Girls (1903)
96. Stories from the Old, Old Bible (1903)
97. That Brilliant Peggy (1903)
98. Tic-Tac-Too, & Butterfly Valley (1903)
99. Petronella, & The Coming of Polly (1904)
100. The Girls of Mrs. Pritchard's School (1904)
101. A Madcap (1904)
102. Nurse Charlotte (1904)
103. A Modern Tomboy: A Story for Girls (1904)
104. A Bevy of Girls (1905)
105. A Young Mutineer: A Story for Girls (1905)
106. The Colonel and the Boy (1906)
107. A Golden Shadow (1906)
108. The Hill-Top Girl (1906)
109. Turquoise and Ruby (1906)
110. Sue: The Story of a Little Heroine and Her Friend (1906; aka [A] Young Heroine: A Story of Sue and Her Friend?)
111. Queen of the Day (1906)
112. A Girl from America (1907)
113. The Red Cap of Liberty (1907)
114. The Little School-Mothers: A Story for Girls (1907)
115. The Scamp Family: A Story for Girls (1907)
116. Three Girls from School (1907)
117. The Lady of Jerry Boy's Dreams: A Story for Girls (1907)
118. The Court Harman Girls (1908)
119. Betty of the Rectory (1908)
120. Sarah's Mother (1908, repr 1914 as Colonel Tracy's Wife)
121. The School Queens: A Story for Girls (1908/10)
122. Blue of the Sea (1909)
123. Blue Shoes and Black (1909)
124. Daddy's Boy (1909)
125. Betty Vivian: A Story of Haddo Court School (1910)
126. Rosa Regina: A Story for Girls (1910)
127. Nance Kennedy (1910)
128. Pretty-Girl and the Others (1910)
129. Their Little Mother: A Story for Girls (1910)
130. The Girls of Merton College (1911)
131. For Dear Dad: A Story for Girls (1911)
132. Corporal Violet (1912)
133. How It All Came Round (1912)
134. Kitty O'Donovan: A School Story (1912)
135. The Chesterton Girl Graduates: A Story for Girls (1913)
136. The Girls of King's Royal: A Story for Girls (1913)
137. The School Favorite: A School Girls Story (1913)
138. Golden Hours Story Book (1913)
139. A Band of Mirth (1914)
140. The Wooing of Monica (1914)
141. The Queen of Joy (1914)
142. The Girls of Castle Rocco: A Home Story for Girls (1914)
143. Greater Than Gold (1915)
144. The Daughter of a Soldier: A Colleen of South Ireland (1915)
145. Jill, the Irresistible (1915)
146. Winter Fun for Merry Hearts (1915)
147. Hollyhock: A Spirit of Mischief (1916)
148. Better Than Riches (1917)
149. Cassie, & Little Mary (c. 1919)

(Designations of these titles as for young readers were gleaned primarily from Worldcat; others below may also belong in the category.)

=== Mysteries ===
1. This Troublesome World (3v., w/Dr. Clifford Halifax, 1893)
2. The Arrest of Captain Vandaleur: How Miss Cusack Discovered His Trick (w/Robert Eustace, 1894)
3. The Ponsonby Diamonds: Stories from the Diary of a Doctor (w/Halifax, 1894)
4. A Princess of the Gutter (1895)
5. The Voice of the Charmer (3v., 1895)
6. Dr. Rumsey's Patient: A Very Strange Story (w/Halifax, 1896)
7. A Son of Ishmael: A Clever Detective Story (1896)
8. Stories from the Diary of a Doctor, Second Series (w/Halifax, 1896)
9. Under the Dragon Throne (w/Robert K. Douglas, 1897)
10. Where the Air Quivered (w/Eustace, 1898)
11. The Cleverest Woman in England (1898)
12. On the Brink of a Chasm: A Record of Plot and Passion (1898)
13. A Master of Mysteries (w/Eustace, 1898)
14. Mr. Bovey's Unexpected Will (w/Eustace, 1899)
15. An Adventuress (1899)
16. The Brotherhood of the Seven Kings (w/Eustace, 1899)
17. The Gold Star Line (w/Eustace, 1899)
18. Wages: A Novel (1900)
19. The Outside Ledge (w/Eustace, 1900)
20. The Sanctuary Club (w/Eustace, 1900)
21. Where the Shoe Pinches (w/Halifax, 1900)
22. The Blue Diamond (1901)
23. The Secret of the Dead (1901)
24. Wheels of Iron (1901)
25. A Race With the Sun (w/Halifax, 1901)
26. Confessions of a Court Milliner (1902)
27. A Double Revenge (1902)
28. The Dead Hand: Being the First of the Experiences of the Oracle of Maddox Street (1902)
29. Fingertips: One of the Sensational Experiences of Diana Marburg, the Oracle of Maddox Street (1902)
30. The Sorceress of the Strand (w/Eustace, 1902)
31. The Lost Square (w/Eustace, 1902)
32. The Face in the Dark (w/Eustace, 1903)
33. The Adventures of Miranda (1904)
34. At the Back of the World (1904)
35. A Maid of Mystery (1904)
36. Silenced (1904)
37. The Lady Cake-Maker (1904)
38. The Oracle of Maddox Street (1904)
39. His Mascot (1905)
40. Bess of Delaney's (1905)
41. A Golden Shadow (1906)
42. From the Hand of the Hunter (1906)
43. The Home of Sweet Content (1906)
44. The Maid With the Goggles (1906)
45. The Girl and Her Fortune (1906)
46. The Chateau of Mystery (1907)
47. The Curse of the Feverals (1907)
48. The Home of Silence (1907)
49. Kindred Spirits (1907)
50. The Red Ruth (1907)
51. The Courtship of Sybil (1908)
52. The Fountain of Beauty (1909)
53. I Will Sing a New Song (1909)
54. The Necklace of Parmona (1909)
55. The Pursuit of Penelope (1909)
56. The Stormy Petrel (1909)
57. Wild Heather (1909)
58. The A. B. C. Girl (1910)
59. Micah Faraday, Adventurer (1910)
60. Twenty-Four Hours: A Novel of Today (1911)
61. The House of Black Magic (1912)
62. The Great Lord Masareene (1913)
63. The Passion of Kathleen Duveen (1913)
64. Her Happy Face (1914)
65. The Maid Indomitable (1916)
66. The Detections of Miss [Florence] Cusack (1998)

=== Other titles ===
1. A Knight of Today (1877)
2. Bel Marjory: A Tale (1878, as : A Story of Conquest 1898)
3. Miss Toosey's Mission (1878)
4. Laddie (1879)
5. The Floating Light of Ringfinnan, and Guardian Angels (1880)
6. A Band of Three (Seaside Library, 1882)
7. A London Baby: The Story of King Roy (1882)
8. How It All Came About (1883)
9. Hermie's Rosebuds and Other Stories (1883)
10. Tip Cat (1884)
11. The Two Sisters (1884)
12. Our Little Ann: A Tale (1885)
13. Merry Chimes for Happy Times (1886)
14. Faithful Friends: Stories of Struggle and Victory (1886)
15. Beforehand (1887)
16. Letters to Our Working-Party (1887)
17. The O'Donnells of Inchfawn (1887)
18. Pen (1888)
19. Poor Miss Carolina (1889)
20. A Farthingful (1889)
21. A Life for a Love: A Story of Today (1891)
22. A Soldier of Fortune (3v., 1894)
23. Kitty O'Hara (c. 1895)
24. The Least of These, and Other Stories (1895)
25. The Heart of Helen (1896)
26. The White Tzar (1896)
27. The Way of a Woman (1897)
28. The Secret of Emu Plain (1898)
29. The Siren (1898)
30. The Girl of St. Wode's (1898)
31. The Cleverest Woman in England (1898)
32. All Sorts (1899)
33. A Plucky Girl (1900)
34. In a Time of Roses (c. 1900)
35. A Stumble by the Way (1901)
36. Stories from the Diary of a Doctor, Third Series (1901)
37. The Blood-Red Cross (1902)
38. Madame Sara (1902)
39. The Face of the Abbot (1902)
40. Through Peril for a Wife (1902)
41. The Pursuit of Penelope (1902, 1909)
42. The Burden of Her Youth (1903)
43. Resurgam (1903)
44. By Mutual Consent (1903)
45. Followed (1903)
46. Rosebury (1903)
47. Love Trumphant (1904)
48. Castle Poverty (1904)
49. Bride of Tomorrow (1904)
50. Nurse Charlotte (1904, j)
51. The Other Woman (1905)
52. Dumps: A Plain Girl (1905)
53. Willful Cousin Kate: A Girl's Story (1905)
54. Old Readymoney's Daughter (1905)
55. Little Wife Hester (1905)
56. Loveday: The Story of an Heiress (1905)
57. The Other Woman (1905)
58. The Face of Juliet (1906)
59. Victory (1906)
60. In the Flower of Her Youth (1906)
61. The Colonel’s Conquest (1907)
62. Little Josephine (1907)
63. The Lady of Delight (1907)
64. The Love of Susan Cardigan (1907)
65. The Aim of Her Life (1908)
66. Hetty Beresford (1908)
67. A Lovely Fiend/Friend and Other Stories (1908)
68. Brother or Husband (1909)
69. A[y]lwyn's Friends (1909)
70. Oceana's Girlhood (1909)
71. The Princess of the Revels (1909)
72. "The Least of These" and Other Stories (191-)
73. Belinda Treherne (1910)
74. Sue, a Little Heroine (1910)
75. A Girl of Today (1910)
76. The Wild Irish Girl (1910)
77. Lady Anne (1910)
78. Miss Gwendoline (1910)
79. Desborough's Wife (1911)
80. The Doctor's Children (1911)
81. The Soul of Margaret Rand (1911)
82. The Girl from Spain (1911)
83. Mother and Son (1911)
84. A Bunch of Cousins and the Barn Boys (1911)
85. Love's Cross Roads (1912)
86. Lord and Lady Kitty (1912)
87. Peggy from Kerry (1912)
88. The Girls of Abinger Close (1913)
89. Elizabeth's Prisoner (1914)
90. A Girl of High Adventure (1914)
91. The Darling of the School (1915)
92. Madge Mostyn's Nieces (1916)
93. The Fairy Godmother (1917)
94. Miss Patricia (1925)
95. Roses and Thorns (1928)
96. Old Rail Fence Corners (2010)
97. Without Witnesses (??)
98. Mrs. Reid's Terror (??)
99. The Pearl: A Complete Story (??)
100. A Botanical Ladder for the Young (??)
101. The Grass-Green Carpet (??)

=== Short stories ===
Although most of Meade's shorter work remains confined to the pages of magazines, examples may be found in the following anthologies:

- A Pretty Pair: Stories (1894)
- Fifty-Two Stories of Pluck, Peril, and Romance for Girls (1896, as Fifty-Two Stirring Stories for Girls c. 1901)
- The Kingfisher's Egg, and Other Stories (1899)
- Sweet Bright Eyes: A Volume of Original Pictures, Stories, and Verses (18--)
- Seaside Story Book, With Tales (c. 1900)
- Sunny Days: A Volume of Original Pictures, Stories, and Verses (c. 1900)
- A Golden Apple, and Other Stories (1902)
- The Merry Wheelers (ss, 1903)
- Seaside Holiday Frolics, With Stories (1910)
- Stories for Holiday Times (1914)
- The Story-Teller: A Volume of Original Pictures, Stories, and Verses (c. 1915)
- Happy Hearts and Merry Eyes: A Book of Stories and Verses (1916)
