= Hibiscus (restaurant) =

Restaurant in London

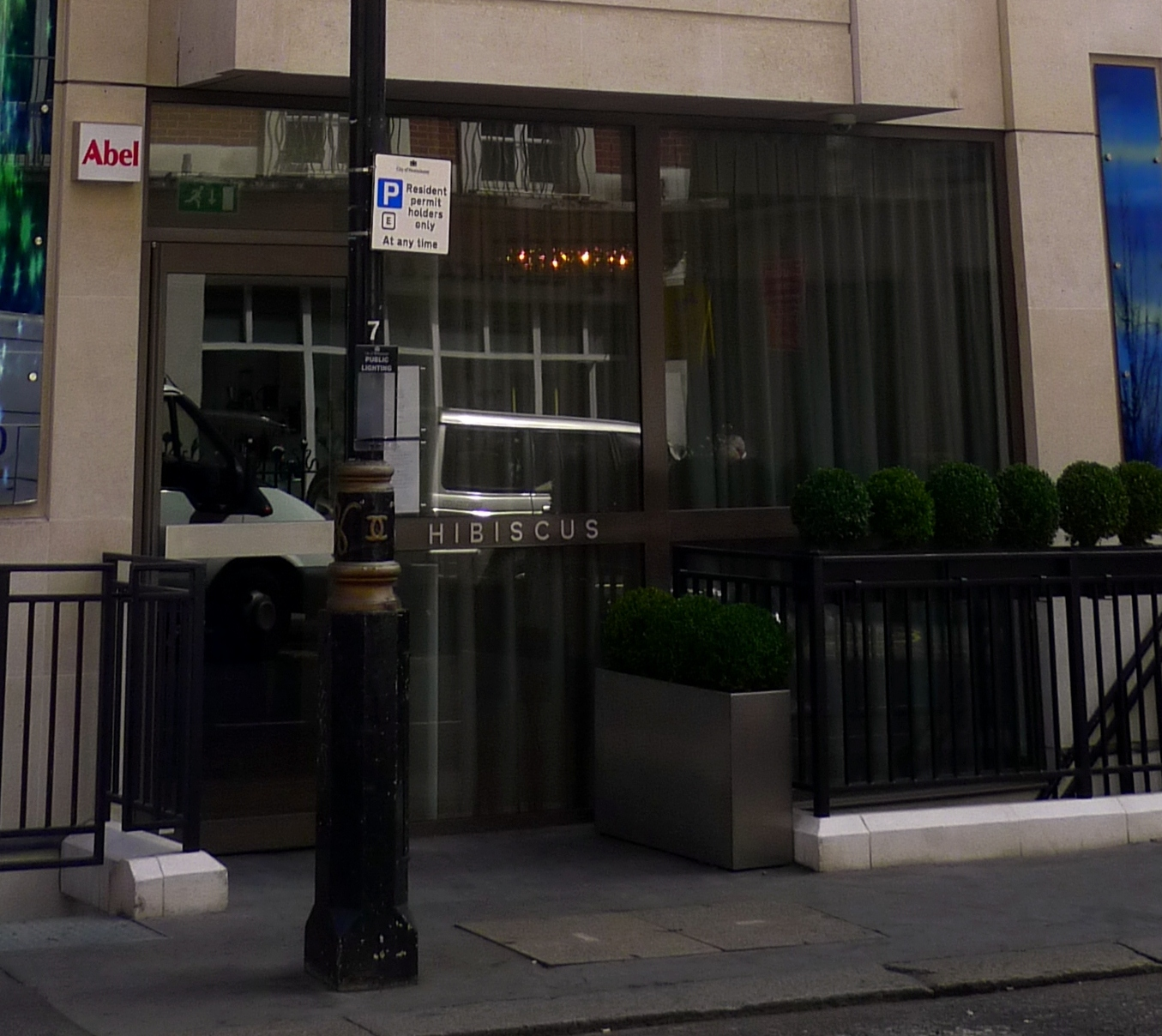
- The main entrance to Hibiscus

- The location of Hibiscus within London

Restaurant information
- Established: 2000; 26 years ago
- Closed: 2016; 10 years ago
- Head chef: Ian Scaramuzza
- Chef: Claude Bosi
- Food type: Modern French cuisine
- Dress code: Smart casual
- Rating: Michelin stars AA Rosettes
- Location: Maddox Street, London, W1, United Kingdom
- Coordinates: 51.512829°N 0.142277°W
- Seating capacity: 45
- Other locations: Ludlow, Shropshire (2000–2006)
- Other information: Nearest station: Oxford Circus
- Website: www.hibiscusrestaurant.co.uk

Hibiscus was a London restaurant which was owned and run by French chef Claude Bosi. It was opened in 2000 in Ludlow, Shropshire, and won its first Michelin star within a year, and a second in the 2004 Guide. In July 2006, Bosi and his wife Claire announced that they were to sell the location in Ludlow and move closer to London. The property was sold to Alan Murchison, and Bosi purchased a new site on Maddox Street in London. The restaurant closed in 2016.

Bosi used molecular gastronomy to create some items on the menu in an effort to enhance their flavours, such as freeze-drying cabbage to create a purée. The restaurant has received mixed reviews from critics, but has been listed in The World's 50 Best Restaurants since 2010, and was named by Egon Ronay as the best restaurant in the UK in 2005. The Good Food Guide ranked Hibiscus as the eighth-best restaurant in the UK in the 2013 edition. It has also been awarded five AA Rosettes.

== History ==
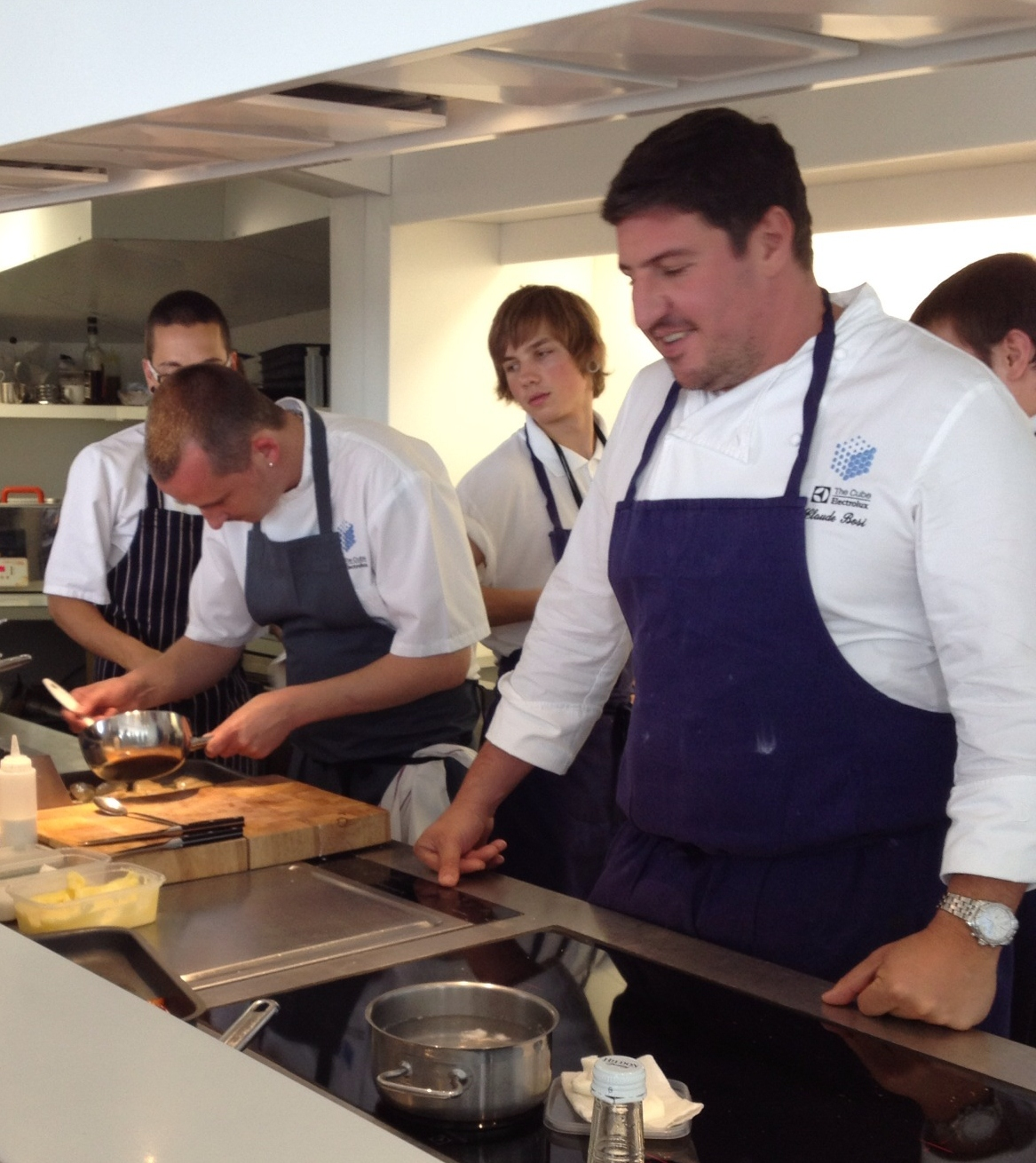
Claude Bosi, chef patron of Hibiscus

Claude Bosi and his wife Claire opened Hibiscus in Ludlow, Shropshire, in 2000. The location had a 36-seat capacity, and was previously occupied by a three AA Rosette restaurant called the Oaks.

Bosi had previously been head chef and won a Michelin star at the Overton Grange restaurant, just outside the town. He had intended to open a restaurant in Warwickshire, but found the premises too expensive and purchased a 25-year lease on the former Oaks property in Ludlow for £40,000. Within a year Hibiscus won its first Michelin star, and at the same time Overton Grange was downgraded before going into receivership.

Working under Bosi at Hibiscus was sous chef Glynn Purnell, who left Hibiscus in 2003 to become head chef at Jessica's restaurant in Edgbaston. Hibiscus gained a second star in the 2004 Michelin Guide.

In July 2006, Bosi and his wife Claire announced that they were intending to sell Hibiscus and open a new restaurant closer to London, or in the capital itself. Hibiscus closed in Ludlow in April 2007, with Bosi selling the site to fellow chef Alan Murchison for £247,500, but retaining the Hibiscus name for himself. The restaurant was renamed "Le Becasse" (sic), and underwent a £100,000 makeover before being re-opened under head chef Will Holland. In 2014, Murchison's company went into voluntary liquidation after running up debts of almost half a million pounds.

Bosi completed the deal in June 2007 for a new site at 29 Maddox Street in London. He intended for the new Hibiscus to be open by September, and to transfer over the style of cooking he had used in Ludlow, saying, "I'm transferring Hibiscus, not starting a new restaurant. The idea is to continue and build on what I have been doing." Purchasing and fitting out the London premises cost around £1 million.

Many of the staff from the Ludlow incarnation of Hibiscus agreed to move to London to continue working at the restaurant, including head chef Marcus McGuinness and sommelier Simon Freeman. Hibiscus re-opened in October 2007 in its new location after following building works and planning delays. The interior of the London-based restaurant was decorated in orange and shades of brown. The walls were covered in pale-coloured wooden panels, and a chandelier designed as a series of globes hungs from the middle of the main dining room's ceiling.

The handover on the first day was so tight that builders moved out at midday, and the first service was run at 7 pm that evening. The late opening resulted in the reviewers for the Michelin Guide having only a two-week window in which to re-assess the restaurant for the 2008 guide. Bosi admitted later that the restaurant was not yet up to scratch in those two weeks and agreed with the decision of Michelin to downgrade Hibiscus to a single star in the 2008 Guide. The restaurant was also given a "rising star" as one with potential to go up to two stars in the future. During the run up to Christmas, the stress of serving 550 covers a week in a new location with a modified menu resulted in three sous chefs resigning.

The two-star award was restored a year later in the 2009 Michelin Guide, as had been predicted by a number of Bosi's fellow chefs including Tom Aikens, Antonin Bonnet and Richard Corrigan. Sat Bains went a step further and said "I would love to see Claude Bosi regain his second star at Hibiscus and win his third in time. He's probably the best chef I know." The restaurant closed permanently in 2016, two days prior to the announcement of the 2017 Michelin Guide for UK and Ireland.

== Menu ==
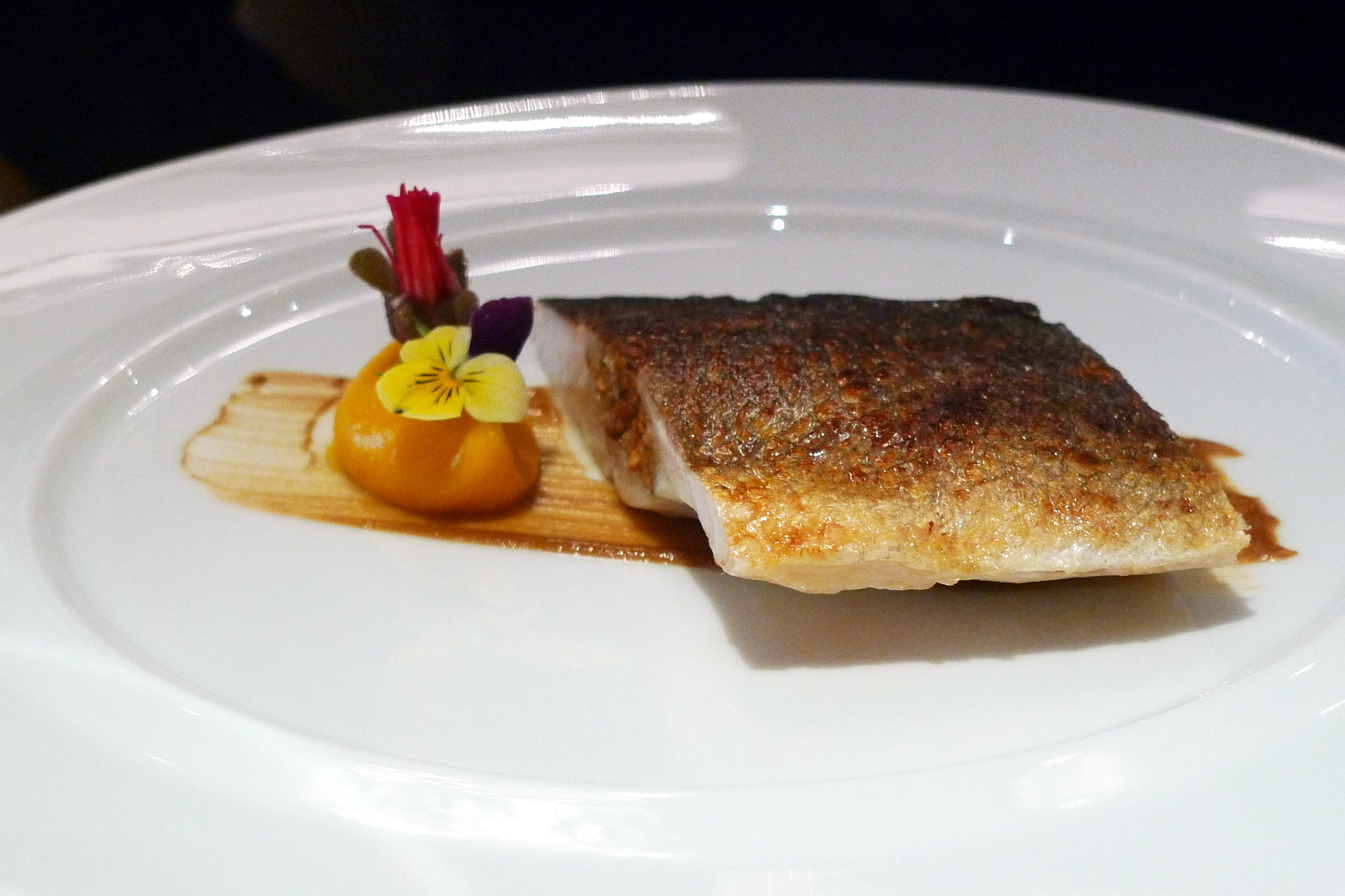
A pan-fried bream dish from Hibiscus

The menu is created by Bosi. He has been described as an innovator and his work has been compared to that of Heston Blumenthal at The Fat Duck. One of the new dishes Bosi introduced following his move to London was a two-part pork dish. The first part was roasted suckling pig served with sea urchin, kohlrabi and a fondant of sweet potato. The second, inspired by his daughter, featured a sausage roll with a salad and a truffle dressing. Other dishes have included roast chicken with an onion fondue and licorice, and desserts include a chocolate tart served with basil ice cream.

Bosi uses molecular gastronomy techniques, such as in the process for making a Savoy cabbage purée, in which the cabbage is freeze dried into a powder and then reconstituted, but he prefers only to enhance the flavours of individual ingredients rather than changing those flavours by using unusual techniques.

== Reviews ==
Jay Rayner reviewed the restaurant for The Observer after Hibiscus moved from Ludlow to London, his first time at the restaurant. While stating that elements of the meal were "very clever indeed", such as foie gras ice cream and a sausage roll he described as a "colossus", he described the desserts as a "disappointment", calling an olive oil parfait a "gloopy mess". Overall, he planned on returning to give Bosi another chance.

Zoe Williams also reviewed the restaurant shortly after it arrived in London, for The Daily Telegraph. She enjoyed her visit, and was impressed with the unusual combinations of foods that worked together saying "the sheer expertise of taking a food with a range of flavours, and knowing it's in peak condition to meet four others ... it really is something".

John Walsh also visited it, for The Independent, after the restaurant arrived in London, and gave the food four stars, and the ambience and service three stars; Terry Durack reviewed it for the same paper, giving the restaurant 17 out of 20.

Food critics from Time Out visited the restaurant in 2009, and were "disappointed" compared to their previous visit. They thought that Bosi's food combinations just did not work, but still said that some of his desserts were "faultless".

Andy Hayler gave the restaurant a score of six out of ten on his scale during his November 2011 visit. The redeeming feature of his trip was a dish of venison, he thought, served with a confit of pear in mulled wine and Savoy cabbage with a red wine and smoked chocolate sauce, but he otherwise felt that the food was "over-worked" and the service "peculiarly amateurish".

=== Ratings and awards ===
In 2005 Hibiscus was one of three restaurants to be awarded three-stars by the Egon Ronay Restaurant Guide, along with The Waterside Inn and Restaurant Tom Aikens, and was named Ronay's Restaurant of the Year.

The restaurant made its first entry in the World's 50 Best Restaurants in 2010, ranked in 49th place and one of three British restaurants in the list; the following year it moved up to 43rd.

The Good Food Guide ranked Hibiscus as the eighth-best restaurant in the UK in its 2013 guide.

The restaurant has been given five AA Rosettes by The Automobile Association.
