= The Swan Inn, Ruislip =

Grade II listed former pub in Ruislip, London

The Swan Inn
- The Swan Inn in 2026, as Annabella's at the Swan
- Interactive map of The Swan Inn
- 51°34′36″N 0°25′37″W
- Type: Former public house
- Location: 10 High Street, Ruislip, Hillingdon, London

History
- Built: 16th century, with later additions

Site notes
- Current use: Restaurant

Listed Building – Grade II
- Designated: 6 September 1974
- Reference no.: 1285707

The Swan Inn is a Grade II listed former public house on the High Street in Ruislip, in the London Borough of Hillingdon. The building developed over several centuries, with its oldest surviving range dating from the 16th century, an adjoining range probably dating from the early 17th century, and the principal block dating from about 1700. It was operating as a licensed house under the name The Swan by 1747.

The Swan remained in use as a public house until its conversion into a Café Rouge restaurant in 2007. Café Rouge closed in November 2022, and the premises reopened in November 2023 as Anabella's at the Swan.

== History ==
=== Origins ===
The oldest surviving part of the building dates from the 16th century. An inspector of ancient buildings who examined the property in October 1936 dated its earliest fabric to around 1500.

The earliest documentary reference identified with the property is a 1565 terrier of the Manor of Ruislip. It recorded five cottages owned by John Walleston on the west side of the High Street. Local historian Eileen M. Bowlt identified the Swan and two neighbouring surviving buildings as remnants of this group.

The building was not originally a licensed public house. Its development took place in several phases. The 1936 survey identified the southern wing as the oldest portion of the building and stated that the adjoining gabled wing had been rebuilt or added around 1600. An 18th-century extension was subsequently added to the rear. Historic England similarly dates the outer range to the 16th century and the adjoining inner range probably to the early 17th century.

=== Development as an inn ===
By 1747, the premises had become a licensed house called The Swan, with Elizabeth Houghton recorded as licensee. The Nicholl or Nicholas family took over the following year and remained associated with the inn until the 1780s, when Samuel Naylor was recorded as licensee.

By 1807, the premises were owned by Samuel Salter, a brewer from Rickmansworth. The Swan subsequently remained a tied house as its associated breweries changed ownership.

For a period during the 1820s, the inn was known as the White Swan, before reverting to the Swan name. Salters was acquired by the Cannon Brewery of Clerkenwell in 1920.

=== Early twentieth century ===
By the early 20th century, the Swan catered to visitors to Ruislip as well as local customers. It sold teas to visitors arriving by bicycle and, after 1904, on Metropolitan Railway trains.

An inventory of the Swan's furniture, fixtures and effects was taken in 1914, when outgoing licensee William Shafto sold them to his successor, Ernest Walter Linger. The premises included four bedrooms, a sitting room, spirit room, scullery, kitchen, tap room, tea-room, bar parlour, private and public bars, a cellar and a stable.

Recreational facilities included darts, dominoes, a ring board and a Spoof board in the tap room, while draughts and cribbage boards were kept in the bar parlour. The garden was furnished with tables, chairs and benches for customers. The inventory also recorded a stuffed squirrel displayed in a case in the sitting room.

Changes to the premises continued during the 20th century. By 1970, the neighbouring Naylor Cottage had been demolished and the Swan had been extended.

=== Later use ===
The Swan Inn was designated a Grade II listed building on 6 September 1974.

In 2007, the public house was acquired by Café Rouge for conversion into a restaurant. Contemporary reporting stated that the proposed changes would not affect the historic portions of the listed building. Following concern over the loss of the Swan name, the restaurant operated as Café Rouge at the Swan.

Café Rouge closed on 7 November 2022. The premises reopened in November 2023 as Anabella's at the Swan. A 2024 planning report by the London Borough of Hillingdon recorded that the new restaurant had opened at the end of 2023.

== Architecture ==
The Swan comprises several phases of construction. At the left-hand side of the High Street frontage are two gabled ranges. Historic England dates the outer range to the 16th century and the inner range probably to the early 17th century. The latter forms a wing to the principal two-storey block, which dates from around 1700. A single-storey wing to the right is modern.

The historic portions have old tiled roofs and are principally pebble-dashed and painted, with tile hanging to the first floor of the left-hand range. Most of the windows are late-19th-century casements, and a gabled projection occupies the centre of the frontage.

The London Borough of Hillingdon's Ruislip Village Conservation Area Appraisal describes the former Swan Inn as an "important local landmark". The appraisal also identifies the left-hand wing as the oldest part of the building, notes later 17th-century additions, and describes the right-hand section as comparatively modern.
