= Claude Bosi =

Michelin-starred chef

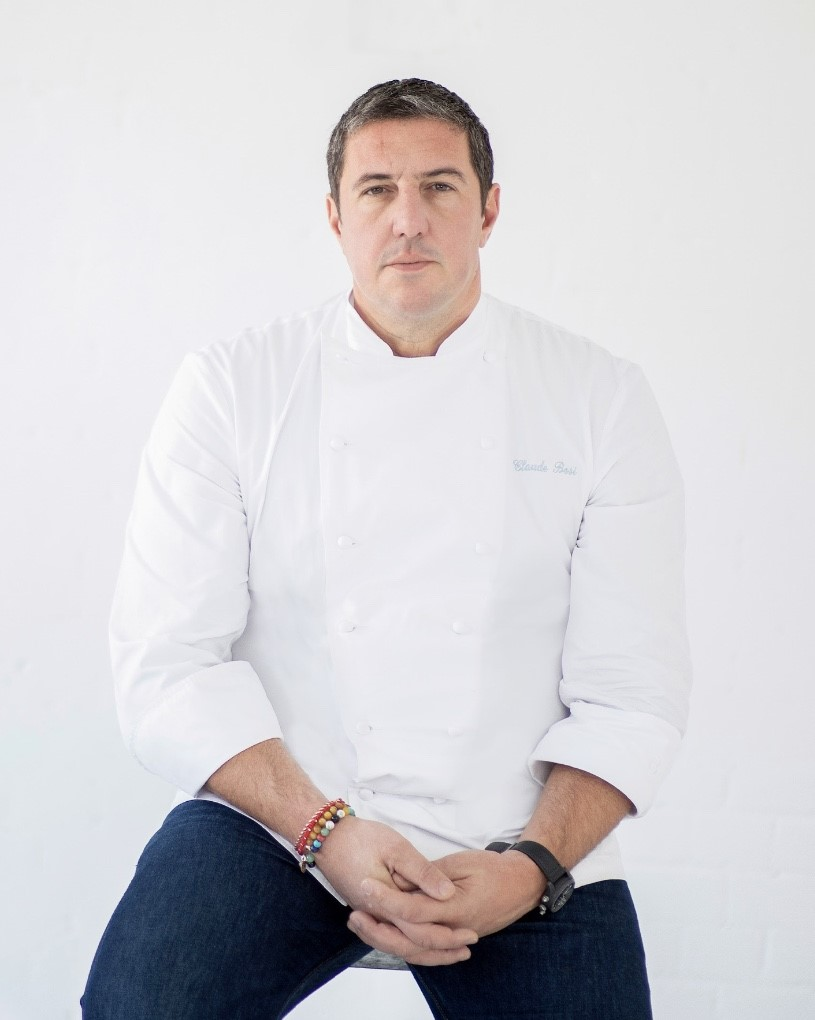
- Born: 1972 (age 53–54); Lyon, Rhône-Alpes, France
- Spouse: Lucy Bosi
- Culinary career
- Cooking style: French cuisine
- Ratings: Michelin stars; AA Rosettes
- Current restaurants: Bibendum; Brooklands; The Fox and Grape; Josephine
- Previous restaurants: Hibiscus; Socca; Overton Grange
- Television show: Saturday Kitchen

Claude Bosi (born 1972) is a French chef. His first Head Chef position was at Overton Grange in 1999. He opened Hibiscus in the market town of Ludlow, Shropshire, in 2000 and was awarded two Michelin Stars in 2004. In 2007, he relocated the restaurant to London, where he went on to reclaim the two Michelin Stars in 2009. He closed Hibiscus in 2016. In early 2017, he opened his new flagship restaurant, Claude Bosi in Bibendum, in the former Michelin headquarters building in Chelsea. This restaurant was awarded 2 Michelin stars after only 6 months of business.

== Career ==
Bosi moved on to work at a variety of Michelin-starred restaurants in France including La Pyramide Fernand Point, Restaurant Chiberta, L'Arpège and Restaurant Alain Ducasse. He was working at L'Arpège when the restaurant won its third Michelin star. He moved to Ludlow, Shropshire, to become sous chef of Overton Grange in 1997. He became head chef, and in 1999, he won his first Michelin star whilst there.

Bosi opened his own restaurant, Hibiscus, also in Ludlow, in 2000. Within a year he had won a Michelin star, and in 2004 he was awarded a second. Hibiscus was sold in March 2007, with Bosi relocating the restaurant to London with the help of three investors. The 45-seat restaurant launch in October 2007 at 29 Maddox Street in Mayfair.

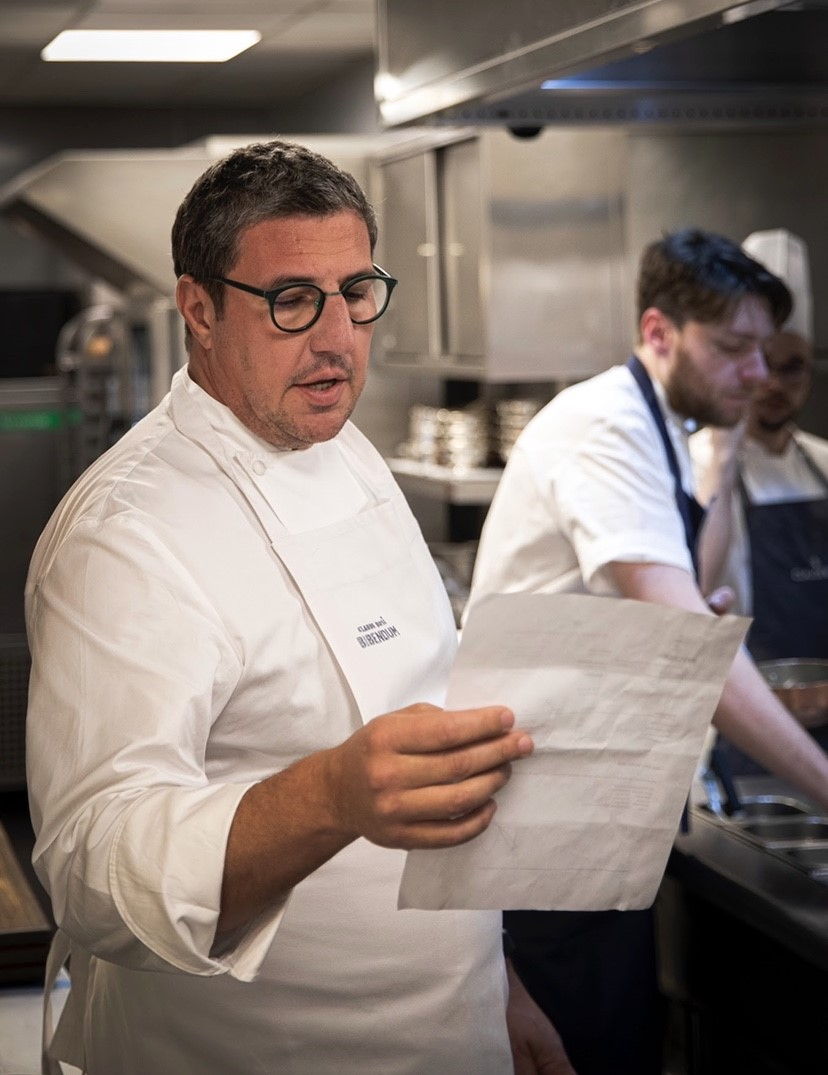
Bosi at work

In 2010, Bosi took over the Wimbledon-based pub The Fox and Grape alongside his brother Cedrick. The duo reopened it as a gastropub whilst retaining the original name. The brothers had previously run a pub together in Yarpole, Herefordshire, until 2010. In 2016, Bosi took over The Swan Inn between Esher and Claygate. After extensive refurbishment the Inn reopened as a gastropub with luxurious rooms in May 2016.

In July 2018, Bosi won the Chef Award at The Caterer's The Catey Awards. He appeared on BBC One's Saturday Kitchen in March 2012. Later in the same year Bosi was one of a number of chefs to work at "The Cube", a pop up restaurant sat on top of London's South Bank Centre.

In 2018, Bosi partnered with Rémy Martin to open La Maison Rémy Martin, a Cognac cocktail and food pairing bar.

== Controversy ==
In November 2012, restaurant blogger James Isherwood awarded Bosi's restaurant three out of five stars on Tripadvisor, reporting that the crab was overcooked. Bosi responded on Twitter: "I think your a Cunt and this its personal sorry...!!" During a heated exchange, he later tweeted at Isherwood: "Please buy yourself a pair of balls and play with them". In an article for the Guardian decrying the use of foul language by Bosi and other star chefs, Sat Bains and Tom Kerridge who he felt had ganged up on the "harmless" Isherwood, Luke Mackay – himself a chef – invited them to bully him instead: "#chefsunite? My hairy, chef-whited arse they do."

== Personal life ==
In January 2020, Bosi revealed that he had been refused permission to stay permanently in the UK after Brexit despite having lived in the country for 23 years.

Claude has three children. A daughter from his first marriage, Paige (2005) and a son and daughter from his second, Freddie (2014) and Mabel (2020).
