= Midsummer House =

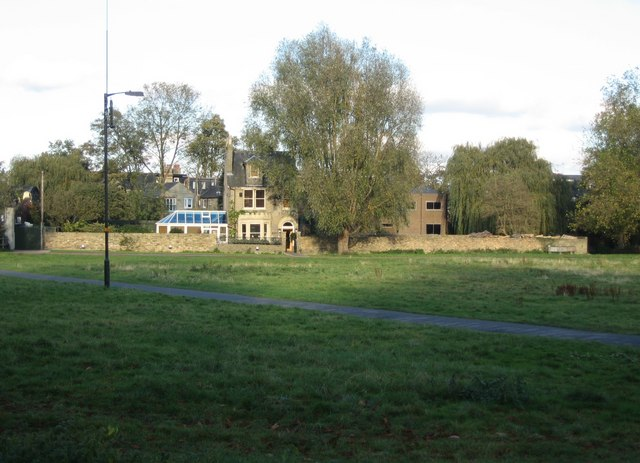
- Interactive map of Midsummer House

Restaurant information
- Established: 1986; 40 years ago
- Owner: Daniel Clifford
- Head chef: Mark Abbott
- Food type: French/British
- Dress code: Smart-casual
- Rating: (Michelin Guide); AA Rosettes
- Location: Midsummer Common, Cambridge, Cambridgeshire, England, United Kingdom
- Coordinates: 52.2102°N 0.1297°E
- Seating capacity: 53
- Reservations: Yes (recommended)
- Other information: Closed Sunday, Monday and Tuesday
- Website: www.midsummerhouse.co.uk

Midsummer House is a restaurant located in Cambridge, England, on the bank of the River Cam. It is a Victorian house that was transformed into a restaurant in 1986. It won its first Michelin star in 2002, and a second in 2005. The chef patron is Daniel Clifford.

== Description ==
The restaurant is located in a townhouse built in 1886 on the bank of the River Cam, on Midsummer Common. The location of the restaurant has been a problem in the past. Twice in 2001, the river overflowed its banks and the restaurant was flooded. In February, the water made it into the wine cellars. In November, with over 5 feet (1.5 m) of water covering the foundations and causing extensive damage to the floor of the dining room, the decision was made to close the restaurant for a month and redecorate at the cost of £100,000, including ripping up the damaged floor and replacing it.

Daniel Clifford took over as head chef in 1998. He became the chef patron of the restaurant in 1999.

== Awards ==
Midsummer House won its first Michelin star in 2002. It was awarded a second in 2004, becoming one of eleven restaurants in the UK and Ireland to hold two stars; it was the only restaurant to be elevated to that level that year. It has been awarded five AA Rosettes, elevated to this status in the 2014 AA Awards. In the Waitrose Good Food Guide 2016 Midsummer House was awarded a cooking score of 8/10, and ranked at number 7 in the guide's top 50 UK restaurants.

In 2014 Midsummer House was voted first place in the TripAdvisor "Travellers Choice Awards" within the UK, and second place in the world.

On 5 October 2015, Daniel Clifford was awarded the "Chef's Chef of the Year" award at the 2015/16 AA awards. Daniel Clifford was praised for turning Midsummer House into one of the country's finest restaurants, while being an "inspiration to so many chefs at all levels"
