= Robert Eustace =

English doctor and author (1869–1943)

Robert Eustace was the pen name of Eustace Robert Barton (1869–1943), an English doctor and author of mystery and crime fiction with a theme of scientific innovation. He also wrote as Eustace Robert Rawlings. Eustace often collaborated with other writers, producing a number of works with the author L. T. Meade and others. He is credited as co-author with Dorothy L. Sayers of the novel The Documents in the Case, for which he supplied the main plot idea and supporting medical and scientific details.

== Life ==
Barton was born in January 1869, the son of Alfred Bowyer Barton, FRCS, and Editha Helen Howell, of The Green, Hampton Court. He was educated at Barham House, Hastings. He first appeared in the Medical Register in 1897. He qualified MRCS. He served in the Royal Army Medical Corps (Temporary Captain) and was awarded the Serbian Order of St. Sava, 5th class. He was working in the County Mental Hospital, Gloucester, in 1932. He died in 1943.

== Bibliography ==
- A Master of Mysteries (1898) with L.T. Meade
- The Secret of Emu Plain (1898) with L.T. Meade (Short Story, sequel to Master of Mysteries)
- The Gold Star Line (1899)
- The Brotherhood of the Seven Kings (1899) with L.T. Meade (Novel)
- Miss Florence Cusack stories: The Arrest of Captain Vandeleur (1899) & The Outside Ledge (1900) with L.T. Meade (Short Stories)
- The Sanctuary Club (1900)
- Followed (1900) with L.T. Meade (Short Story)
- The Man Who Disappeared (1901) with L.T. Meade (Short Story)
- The Last Square (1902) with L.T. Meade (Short Story)
- The Oracle of Maddox Street: The Dead Hand (1902) & Fingertips (1902) with L.T. Meade (Short Stories)
- The Stolen Pearl (1903) with Gertrude Warden
- The Sorceress of the Strand (Madame Sara) (1903) with L.T. Meade (three Short Stories: Madame Sara, Blood Red Cross, The Face of the Abott)
- A Human Bacillus (1907)
- The Tea-Leaf (1925) with Edgar Jepson
- The Documents in the Case (1930) with Dorothy L. Sayers
