= Nadiya Bakes =

British cooking show

- Nadiya Hussain on cover of Radio Times
- Genre: Cookery
- Directed by: Katy Fryer
- Presented by: Nadiya Hussain
- Country of origin: United Kingdom
- Original language: English
- No. of series: 1
- No. of episodes: 8

Production
- Executive producers: Katy Fryer, Anna Miralis
- Producer: Laia Niubo
- Editor: Jon Hubbard
- Running time: 30 minutes
- Production company: Wall to Wall Media

Original release
- Network: BBC Two
- Release: 9 September – 21 October 2020

Nadiya Bakes is an eight-part cookery series presented by Nadiya Hussain on British television. Hussain shares recipes for her most indulgent desserts.

== Book ==
A tie-in cookery book was published by Michael Joseph in September 2020 to coincide with BBC series.

== See also ==
- The Chronicles of Nadiya
- Nadiya's British Food Adventure
- Nadiya's Family Favourites
