= Byland =

Byland may refer to:

- A Peninsula or byland (also biland)
- Byland Abbey, a small village and ruined abbey in North Yorkshire
- Byland with Wass, a civil parish in North Yorkshire
- Battle of Old Byland
