= Oldstead =

Village and civil parish in North Yorkshire, England

Coordinates: 54°12′49″N 1°11′17″W

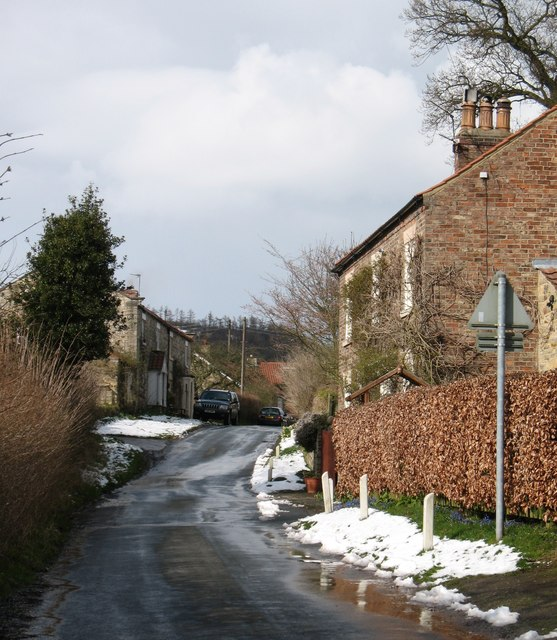
- Oldstead village street

- Location within North Yorkshire
- Population: 68 (2001 Census)
- OS grid reference: SE529801
- Civil parish: Oldstead
- Unitary authority: North Yorkshire
- Ceremonial county: North Yorkshire
- Region: Yorkshire and the Humber
- Country: England
- Sovereign state: United Kingdom
- Post town: YORK
- Postcode district: YO61
- Dialling code: 01347
- Police: North Yorkshire
- Fire: North Yorkshire
- Ambulance: Yorkshire
- UK Parliament: Thirsk and Malton

Oldstead is a village and a civil parish in North Yorkshire, England, within the North York Moors National Park, off the A170 road between Thirsk and Helmsley, below the Hambleton Hills. Nearby villages include Wass, Kilburn and Coxwold. Oldstead shares a parish council with Byland with Wass. Oldstead has a moor called Oldstead Moor, a place of worship and an area called Scotch Corner (not to be confused with Scotch Corner Middleton Tyas).

It was part of the Ryedale District between 1974 and 2023. It is now administered by North Yorkshire Council.

== Features ==
Scotch Corner, or Scot's Corner, is reputed to be the site of the Battle of Old Byland in 1322. At the corner are two buildings originally renovated from dilapidated barns during 1956/7 by the sculptor John Bunting, who dedicated the larger of the two buildings as a non-denominational war memorial chapel and decorated it with several of his sculptures and stained glass windows. The chapel is opened to the public three times each year.

East of the village lies Mount Snever, a hill upon which stands a tower, known as Mount Snever Observatory. It was built in 1838 to commemorate Queen Victoria's coronation.

== Amenities ==
Oldstead has one pub called the Black Swan, which was awarded a Michelin star for the first time in the 2012 guide. It is currently the only restaurant in Yorkshire and the North East to hold the highly sought-after combination of four AA rosettes and a Michelin Star. Head chef Tommy Banks was the youngest Michelin-starred chef in 2013 and made his TV debut on BBC Two's Great British Menu in 2016.

== See also ==
- Listed buildings in Oldstead
