= The Black Swan, Oldstead =

Restaurant in North Yorkshire, England

The Black Swan
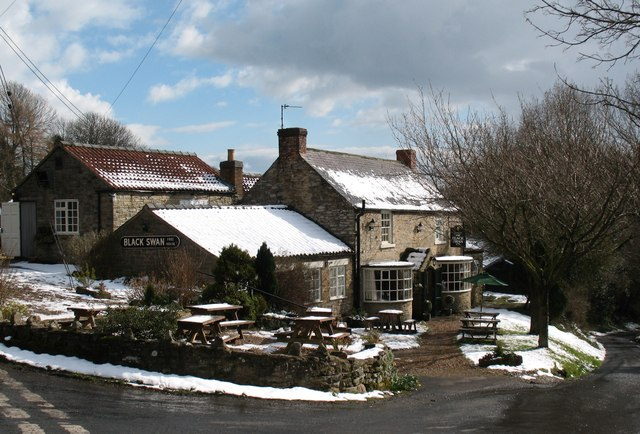
- The restaurant in 2008

- Location within North Yorkshire

Restaurant information
- Owner: The Banks family
- Chef: Tommy Banks
- Food type: British
- Rating: Michelin Guide; AA Rosettes
- Location: Oldstead, North Yorkshire, England
- Coordinates: 54°12′43″N 1°11′16″W
- Website: blackswanoldstead.co.uk

The Black Swan is a restaurant with rooms in Oldstead, a village in North Yorkshire, England. which provides food, drink and accommodation. Its restaurant, run by chef Tommy Banks, has been awarded a Michelin Star and Four AA Rosettes. It was rated the best restaurant in the world in 2017 by TripAdvisor.

== History ==
The Black Swan is a 16th-century building at Oldstead in the southwest corner of the North York Moors National Park. The inn had been used for many years by travellers visiting nearby attractions such as Byland Abbey, the Kilburn White Horse and Shandy Hall. In 1840, the licensed victualler was Ann Easton.

In 2006, The Black Swan was bought by Tom and Anne Banks. Their sons Tommy and James became involved in the running of the pub and restaurant, with Tommy working in the kitchen and James running the front of the house. In 2010, The Black Swan won Two AA Rosettes and was voted AA Pub of the Year in England.

In 2012, the restaurant won a Michelin Star with Adam Jackson as head chef. When Jackson left to set up his own restaurant in June 2013, Tommy Banks took over as head chef. The restaurant retained its Michelin Star and Banks, at the age of 24, became the youngest chef to hold a Michelin Star. In 2016, the restaurant was awarded Four Rosettes by the AA. In 2017, TripAdvisor named it The Best Restaurant in the World based on customers' reviews, the first British restaurant to top their list since it began in 2012.
