= Tommy Banks (chef) =

British chef (born 1989)

- Born: 3 June 1989 (age 37); Oldstead, North Yorkshire, England
- Occupations: Chef & Entrepeneur
- Known for: Michelin Star Chef Entrepreneur TV Personality
- Notable work: Roots
- Website: https://tommybanks.co.uk/

Tommy Banks (born 1 June 1989) is a Michelin-starred British chef, restaurateur and entrepreneur building a collection of food, hospitality and media businesses rooted in North Yorkshire.

Banks is Chef Director of the Tommy Banks Group, which operates The Black Swan at Oldstead, Roots in York and The Abbey Inn at Byland. He is also the owner of Tommy Banks Hospitality, a bespoke events and hospitality business, and the founder of Tommy’s Pie Shop and Made in Oldstead, a nationwide food box business operated by the Tommy Banks Group.

Banks is Co-Founder of Jeopardy Hospitality an organisation dedicated to saving pubs at risk of being lost across England.

In 2025, Banks co-founded a production company called Tommy Banks Productions.

== Early Life ==
Banks was born and raised on a farm called Oldstead Grange in the North Yorkshire village of Oldstead. The Banks family had farmed in and around Oldstead for five generations. Oldstead Grange was originally an arable farm until making the transition to mixed farming. In recent years, the farm has become home to an established herd of Dexter cattle, Herdwick sheep and Mangalica pigs - all of which are bred for supplying the restaurants.

Banks and his older brother James, also helped their parents, Tom & Anne run a B&B from the family home before buying the local pub The Black Swan, in 2006.

Banks attended Easingwold Secondary School, known today as Outwood Academy Easingwold as a young child and into his teenage years. Banks aspired to be a professional cricketer and struggled academically, eventually leaving school at age 17, with just a handful of GCSE's.

Following the death of his grandfather, Fred, Banks was diagnosed with a very aggressive form of ulcerative colitis at the age of 18, leading to three major surgeries, including the removal of his entire bowel and a period of immobility. His illness left him severely underweight with a colostomy bag and prematurely ended his cricketing career, forcing him to pursue an alternative and work in his family's pub. Banks attributed his keen interest in cooking began by reading numerous cookbooks whilst in hospital.

== The Black Swan ==
On the 5th June 2006, when he was 17, Banks's parents bought the pub and restaurant The Black Swan at Oldstead, which officially opened on 1st August 2006. In 2026, The Black Swan celebrates it's 20th Anniversary.

Tommy and the Banks family tended to the 3-acre kitchen garden which sits directly next to The Black Swan. Here, Tommy and the family set up various poly-tunnels, planting beds to grow a variety of herbs and vegetables which still supply the restaurant to this day.

Tommy worked in all areas of The Black Swan, including front of house, pot-wash and the kitchen, where he started to learn to cook. He had no formal training as chef, but worked several unpaid stages in Michelin-starred restaurants including a week in Raymond Blanc's restaurant in Oxfordshire, Le Manoir aux Quat'Saisons.

The restaurant first won a Michelin Star in 2012 with Adam Jackson as chef. When Jackson left to set up his own restaurant in June 2013, Banks took over as head chef at The Black Swan. At the age of 24, Banks was one of the youngest chefs to receive a Michelin Star when the restaurant retained its Michelin Star that year.

In 2017, under Tommy's leadership, The Black Swan won 'Best Restaurant in the World' according to Tripadvisor. The award brought The Black Swan worldwide exposure, with guests travelling from across the globe to dine at Banks' restaurant - with 700 daily email requests for a table booking.

In 2021, it was awarded a Michelin Green Star recognising the team’s commitment to sustainability, and in 2025 was included in La Liste Top 1000 Restaurants. Most recently, The Black Swan placed at no. 72 in SquareMeal’s Top 100 UK Restaurants 2026 and no. 71 at the National Restaurant Awards 2026.

== Roots ==
On 15 September 2018, Banks and his friend and business partner Matthew Lockwood opened the Banks' second restaurant, Roots (previously The Bay Horse), in the centre of York.

Located on the historical street of Marygate, backing onto the Museum Gardens, Roots is a Michelin Star restaurant in York. Following a 6-month renovation, Roots reopened with a small-plates format, inspired by the menu at The Black Swan. The restaurant's menu uses seasonal ingredients, including produce from the Bank's own family farm and incorporates preservation techniques also used at The Black Swan.

Roots gained a Michelin star in the 2021 awards ceremony and was awarded Best Restaurant at The Observer Food Monthly Awards, 2022. More recently Roots placed at no. 56 in SquareMeal’s Top 100 UK Restaurants 2026.

== Made in Oldstead ==
In March 2020 Banks and Lockwood set up Made In Oldstead, a premium food box delivery service. This was launched primarily to help pay suppliers and staff unable to be furloughed after the temporary closure of their restaurants due to COVID-19.

Food boxes were delivered weekly around North Yorkshire - including a weekly trip to the ICU at York Hospital with care packages for hospital staff.

Since 2020, Made in Oldstead has evolved, offering premium at home food boxes, luxury hampers, corporate gifting and Tommy's range of best-selling pies called Tommy's Pie Shop.

In early December 2024, Banks' refrigerated delivery van was stolen from their production unit in Melmerby, with over 2500 pies inside. The pies, worth £25,000 were destined for York Christmas Markets, where Tommy's Pie Shop had been operating a stand. The news went viral, with national media attention. Banks took to social media to appeal to the thieves directly asking them to "do the right thing" and anonymously donate the pies to local a community centre. The van was eventually found abandoned in Middlesbrough, with new vehicle registration plates and the perished pies still inside.

== Tommy Banks Hospitality ==
The Tommy Banks Group expanded further with Tommy Banks Hospitality, its bespoke event and commercial catering arm, which brings the same food-led approach to larger-scale stadia venues and events.

The business currently operates at premium destinations including Allianz Stadium, Henley Royal Regatta, Wembley Stadium, Hampton Court Palace, Wimbledon, Lord’s Cricket Ground, Silverstone and has his own restaurant called Banks on The Wear at the Stadium of Light.

== The Abbey Inn ==
The Abbey Inn situated across the road from Byland Abbey, opened its doors in May 2023. Boasting views of the abbey ruins, the pub has 70-covers and three luxury bedrooms.

In March 2024 The Abbey Inn was awarded the Top New Restaurant in Yorkshire at Condé Nast Traveller Awards UK and in January 2025, it won the Estrella Damm Sustainable Pub of theYear and was crowned 'Best Sunday Roast' by Good Food Guide. January 2026 saw The Abbey Inn rise to no. 13 in the Top 50 Gastropubs List and place at no. 60 in SquareMeal’s Top 100 UK Restaurants.

== Jeopardy Hospitality ==
In 2025, Tommy Banks joined forces again with business partner and friend Matthew Lockwood, his brother James Banks, and entrepreneur Neil Armstrong to launch Jeopardy Hospitality - a venture dedicated to restoring and reopening historic pubs across the UK.

The group focused on celebrating each venue's character while strengthening community ties, creating jobs, and championing local suppliers. The venture offers new career paths for both local communities and existing Tommy Banks Group employees.

Their first opening, The General Tarleton near Ferrensby, North Yorkshire reopened in September 2025 following a thoughtful restoration. The General Tarleton has received widespread recognition, including five stars from William Sitwell in The Telegraph, a No. 44 ranking in The Good Food Guide’s ‘100 Best Pubs’ list, and a ‘One to Watch’ accolade at the Estrella Damm Top 50 Gastropubs Awards.

== Roots Cookbook ==
On 5 April 2018 Banks's first cookbook, Roots, was published by The Orion Publishing Group. It was the UK winner of the Gourmand World Cookbook Awards in the Chef category 2018.

The book is based on Tommy's farm-to-table ethos and splits his cooking methods into three seasons throughout the year - the preserving season, the hunger gap and the time of abundance.

== Television Appearances ==
In 2016, Banks took part in Great British Menu and the theme for that year was 'Great Britain and Great Britons'.

In the 2016 final, he won the fish course with a dish called "Preserving The Future" featuring cured mackerel, woodruff vinegar gel, ewes milk yoghurt with a linseed cracker and oyster leaves.

He also appeared in the programme in 2017 and made it to the final again, winning the fish course for the second year in a row, with his turbot, strawberries and cream dish - a twist on a Wimbledon classic.

Banks appeared once again on the 2020 Great British Christmas Menu, and won the petit-fours with his dish called "The Night Before Christmas".

Since 2019, Banks has been a veteran judge for Great British Menu. In 2019, he judged the Northern Ireland heats, in 2020 and 2023, he judged the London and South East heats, in 2021 and 2026, he judged the Wales heats, and in 2024 and 2025, he judged the Central heats.

Banks was co-host of The Big Family Cooking Showdown with Angellica Bell in 2018. He regularly appears on Saturday Kitchen James Martin's Saturday Morning and Sunday Brunch as a guest chef.

== Personal life ==
Banks is married with three children and lives in North Yorkshire.
