= Listed buildings in Oldstead =

Oldstead is a civil parish in the county of North Yorkshire, England. It contains seven listed buildings that are recorded in the National Heritage List for England. All the listed buildings are designated at Grade II, the lowest of the three grades, which is applied to "buildings of national importance and special interest". The parish contains the village of Oldstead and the surrounding countryside. The listed buildings consist of houses and associated structures, a former mill and miller's house, and a former observatory.

== Buildings ==
Name and location	Photograph	Date	Notes
Abbey House; 54.21400°N 1.18793°W	—	Late 17th to early 18th century	The house is in limestone with sprocketed eaves and a steeply pitched pantile roof. There are two storeys and three bays. On the front is a stable door, and the windows are casements.
Cam House; 54.22628°N 1.17064°W		Early 18th century	The house is in limestone with a Welsh slate roof. There are two storeys and four bays. The doorway has a channelled lintel, the window above the doorway is blocked, and the other windows are horizontally-sliding sashes. Inside, there is an inglenook fireplace.
Oldstead Hall; 54.21563°N 1.18556°W		Late 18th century	The house, which has been extended, is in limestone with a stepped eaves course, and an M-shaped stone slate roof with a shaped kneeler and gable coping on the left. There are two storeys, and two parallel ranges, with a front of six bays, a wing to the left, and an entrance lobby at the rear. The left part of the front has three bays, and to the right is a canted bay window with a pyramidal roof. On the left part is a doorway with a fanlight, and the windows are sashes.
Stable block, Oldstead Hall; 54.21553°N 1.18612°W	—	Late 18th century	The stables and coach house have been converted for residential use. The coach house on the left is in brick, the stables are in sandstone, and both have a pantile roof with gable copings and shaped kneelers. The coach house contains two tall brick arches. The stable has two storeys and a cellar, and four bays. It contains a round-headed door on the left, a board door under a round arch, and the windows are sashes, some blocked.
Oldstead Mill; 54.21598°N 1.18460°W	—	Late 18th century	The mill, later converted for residential use, and the miller's house, are in sandstone and limestone, and have a pantile roof with gable copings and shaped kneelers, and two storeys. The mill has a fixed window and a horizontally-sliding sash window, and at the junction with the house is a porch. On the house are horizontally-sliding sashes, and inside the mill is a retained waterwheel and gearing.
Ashberry House; 54.21271°N 1.18807°W	—	Late 18th to early 19th century	Two cottages combined into one house, it is in brick, with a cogged eaves course and a pantile roof. There are two storeys and three bays. The doorway has a fluted architrave, a divided fanlight, and a cornice on consoles. The windows are sashes with wedge lintels and keystones.
Mount Snever Observatory; 54.21712°N 1.17782°W		1838	The observatory is housed in a square limestone tower about 35 feet (11 m) in height, with a platform on the front. The doorway has a massive stone lintel, it is flanked by buttresses, and over it is an inscription. Above is a three-light fixed window, a wooden parapet, and coped angle turrets. There is another inscription on the rear.
