= Nadiya Hussain =

British television chef, baker and author (born 1984)

Nadiya Hussain MBE
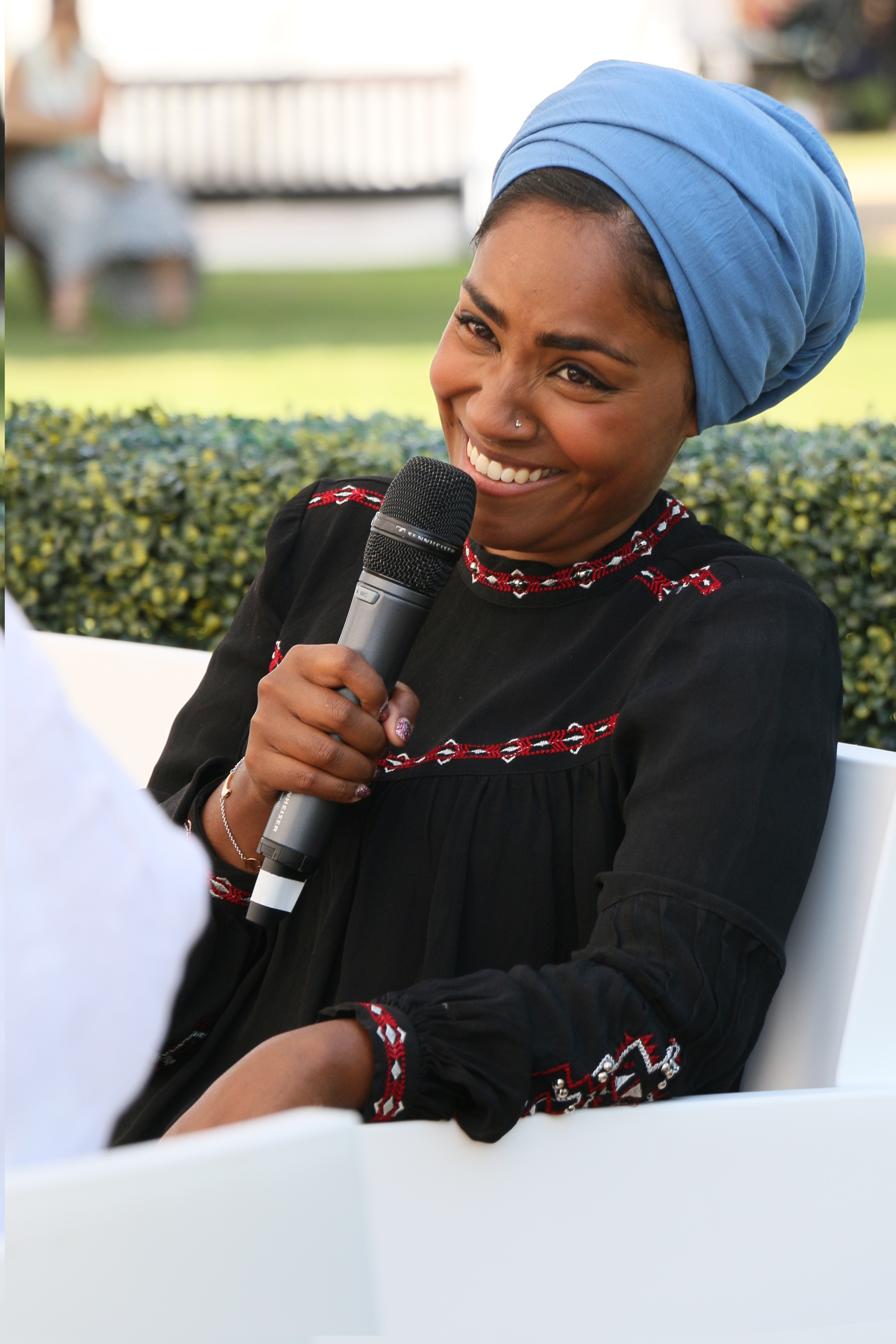
- Nadiya Hussain in 2019
- Born: Nadiya Jamir Begum; 25 December 1984 (age 41); Luton, Bedfordshire, England
- Occupations: Television personality; Presenter; Newspaper columnist; Author
- Years active: 2015–present
- Employers: The Times; BBC; ITV
- Television: The Great British Bake Off; The Chronicles of Nadiya; Junior Bake Off; Nadiya's British Food Adventure; The Big Family Cooking Showdown; Nadiya's Family Favourites; Nadiya Bakes; Nadiya's Time to Eat
- Spouse: Abdal Hussain (m. 2005)
- Children: 3
- Website: www.nadiyahussain.com

Nadiya Jamir Hussain (née Begum; born 25 December 1984) is a British television chef, author and television personality. She rose to fame after winning the sixth series of BBC's The Great British Bake Off in 2015. Since winning, she has signed contracts with the BBC to host the documentary The Chronicles of Nadiya and TV cookery series Nadiya's British Food Adventure and Nadiya's Family Favourites; co-presented The Big Family Cooking Showdown; and has become a regular contributor on The One Show.

Hussain is a columnist for The Times Magazine and has signed publishing deals with Penguin Random House, Hodder Children's Books and Harlequin. She has appeared as a guest panellist on ITV's Loose Women. She was invited to bake a cake for the 90th birthday celebrations of Elizabeth II.

In 2017, Hussain was named by Debrett's as one of the 500 most influential people in the UK and was on BBC News' 100 Women list. She was also shortlisted for Children's Book of the Year prize at the British Book Awards for Bake Me A Story and was nominated for Breakthrough Star at the Royal Television Society Awards for The Chronicles of Nadiya. Ted Cantle, the author of a government report on community cohesion, said Hussain had done "more for British-Muslim relations than 10 years of government policy".

== Early life ==
Hussain is a second-generation British Bangladeshi, born and raised in Luton, Bedfordshire, where she attended Maidenhall Infant School, Challney High School and Luton Sixth Form College. She has five siblings: three sisters and two brothers. Hussain's father, who originates from Beanibazar, Sylhet District, was a chef and owned an Indian restaurant. Hussain started wearing a hijab at the age of 14 to cover up her "bad hair more than anything else" because her father "cut it really badly." As a teenager, she was diagnosed with panic disorder and underwent cognitive behavioural therapy. She revealed her mental health difficulties in a Sport Relief film and tackled childhood anxiety in her book My Monster and Me.

Hussain learned basic cooking skills at school. Her mother never baked and used the oven for storage. She taught herself the rest from recipe books and watching videos on YouTube. Her favourite book is a baking-themed book by Irish novelist Marian Keyes.

At the time of The Great British Bake Off, Hussain was "a full-time mum" living in Leeds with her husband, an IT specialist, and three children, while studying for an Open University degree in Childhood and Youth Studies. When she won the final they moved to Milton Keynes, nearer to London, so that she could pursue a culinary career.

== Television career ==
=== 2015: The Great British Bake Off ===
Hussain appeared in and won the sixth series (Season 3 on PBS, or Collection 3 on Netflix in the US) of The Great British Bake Off which aired from 5 August to 7 October 2015. During the final she baked 16 iced buns in three hours, as well as raspberry-flavoured mille-feuille, to one of Paul Hollywood's recipes, in two hours, and a multi-layered presentation cake which took the form of "My Big Fat British Wedding Cake", in a time of four hours. During her acceptance speech, she said:

I'm never gonna put boundaries on myself ever again. I'm never gonna say I can't do it. I'm never gonna say 'maybe'. I'm never gonna say, 'I don't think I can.' I can and I will.

With more than 15 million viewers, the final was the most-watched show of 2015. Her appearance on the show and ensuing popularity with audiences were deemed important steps toward shifting stereotypes about the Muslim community and acceptance about cultural diversity. Hussain established a large following on social media. Her online followers describe themselves as "Nadiyators" and she also won the backing of then Prime Minister David Cameron.

On 25 December, Hussain made a cameo appearance in the BBC One show Michael McIntyre's Big Christmas Show recorded at the Theatre Royal, Drury Lane.

=== 2016: The Chronicles of Nadiya ===
In August 2016, Hussain was presenter of a two-part food travelogue, The Chronicles of Nadiya, on BBC One, in which she travelled to Bangladesh to trace her culinary roots. She visited her paternal grandfather's village in Sylhet in the northeast of Bangladesh. She cooked for the crew of one of the country's famous paddle steamers, and visited a riverside village where they still practise the ancient art of otter fishing. In the capital Dhaka, she helped 'Thrive', a charity delivering meals to deprived schoolchildren. The first episode debuted immediately after The Great British Bake Off on 24 August, and was watched by 4.5 million viewers, a 20.5% share of all television viewers during the broadcast slot. The series was nominated at the 2017 National Television Awards under 'Factual Entertainment'. Hussain was nominated for Breakthrough star at the 2017 Royal Television Society Awards.

In November 2016, Hussain was a judge on the fourth series of Junior Bake Off on CBBC. Hussain replaced Mary Berry on the competition show in which 40 children aged between nine and twelve compete to create the best cakes and treats.

On 21 December 2016, Hussain presented a two-hour cookery show at her home on BBC Radio 2 alongside Olly Smith as part of BBC's Christmas radio line-up. The show was her first new programme after signing a deal to make the BBC her 'home', rebuffing speculation she would join Channel 4's version of Bake Off.

=== 2017: Nadiya's British Food Adventure ===
From July to September 2017, Hussain presented Nadiya's British Food Adventure, an eight-part series on BBC Two. Hussain travelled across the country, visiting food producers, and then returned to her kitchen to cook using ingredients found on her journeys. A tie-in cookery book, published by Michael Joseph, features new recipes that use British ingredients cooked in a Bangladeshi style, such as Masala eggy bread, Yorkshire pudding with chia seeds and aubergine pakoras with ketchup.

From August to November 2017, Hussain co-presented The Big Family Cooking Showdown alongside Zoë Ball. Hussain left the show after the end of series one to focus on her own show, Nadiya's Family Favourites, and mentioned the decision was born of her desire to get back to cooking.

=== 2018–present ===
In July 2018, Hussain's second TV cookery series Nadiya's Family Favourites aired on BBC Two. The six-part series Time to Eat, first shown on BBC Two in July and August 2019, included various 'time-saving kitchen hacks' and recipes designed to save time and allow families to stay within budget. The show entered the Netflix catalog in April 2020.

Hussain also starred in an eight part series, Nadiya Bakes, first shown on BBC Two in September and October 2020.

=== Other appearances ===
Hussain has appeared as a reporter for The One Show on BBC One.

Hussain is a guest presenter on Loose Women. She announced on the programme that she had been given the honour of baking the Queen's 90th birthday cake, an orange drizzle cake with orange curd and orange butter cream. Hussain said: "When I told the kids (I was making a cake for the Queen), the boys were great at keeping it a secret. I told my daughter and she said, 'Oh Mary Berry? You've made lots of cakes for Mary Berry'."

On 13 August 2016, Hussain appeared as guest on BBC Radio 4's Desert Island Discs, and was interviewed by Kirsty Young. She opened up about her struggles as a young mother, the social isolation suffered by some Muslim women and how her confidence grew during Bake-Off. She described the racial abuse she still receives on the street and, determined to be a good role model to her children, how she responds with the "dignity of silence".

Hussain was a guest on BBC One's The Graham Norton Show on 9 December 2016 and 12 November 2021. She also appeared on Would I Lie to You as a guest in Season 10.

== Writing career ==
=== Newspaper and magazine columns ===
Hussain is a Contributing Editor to the UK's biggest food media brand, the BBC's Good Food. Hussain also writes a monthly column for The Times Magazine, a part of the Saturday supplement of The Times, and was previously columnist for Essentials magazine.

Her recipes have also appeared in BBC's Good Food magazine, The Guardian and The Telegraph.

=== Author ===
Hussain was signed by UK publisher Michael Joseph, part of Penguin Random House, for her debut book Nadiya's Kitchen, which is a collection of the recipes which she cooks for friends and family. In 2017, Michael Joseph published a tie-in cookery book for Hussain's primetime eight-part BBC2 cookery series of the same name, Nadiya's British Food Adventure.

Hussain has written a children's book of stories and recipes, Bake Me A Story, published by Hodder Children's Books, which blends updated versions of fairytales (poor "Sleepless Beauty" just needs a cup of cardamom-infused hot chocolate to break her curse; resourceful Jack wins the giant over with bean patties) with colourful illustrations and child-friendly recipes. In 2017, Bake Me A Story was shortlisted for Children's Book of the Year prize at the British Book Awards. Following the success, a second cookbook and storybook compilation, Nadiya's Bake Me a Festive Story was published in October 2017.

The 2016 chart of the Top 100 Food & Drink books by book sales, compiled by industry analysts Nielsen, placed Hussain's books Nadiya's Kitchen and Bake Me A Story in third and fourth place, respectively.

Hussain released her first novel, The Secret Lives of the Amir Sisters, in January 2017 with help from author Ayisha Malik; it was described as a British Muslim take on Little Women. A review published in The Guardian by Jenny Colgan sparked a fierce backlash on social media after Colgan questioned whether Hussain "really need[s] to put her name to a novel, too, when there's only so much shelf space to go around?" and accused Hussain of being "greedy".

Her autobiography, Finding My Voice, was published by Headline Publishing Group in 2019. It includes some of her own recipes and poetry.

Hussain's cookery book Nadiya's Everyday Baking was published by Michael Joseph in 2022. It hit The Sunday Times Bestsellers List, charting at number five in the Manuals chart.

== Cookery ==
=== Homewares collection ===
In 2018, Hussain launched her own Homeware range in collaboration with BlissHome. The collection features designs across a full tableware range, as well as spice racks, candles, aprons, oven gloves and tea towels.

Hussain's Make Life Colourful Range from BlissHome won 'Best Brand Licensed Homewares Product or Range' at the 2019 Brand & Lifestyle Licensing Awards.

=== Spice brand ===
In 2023, Schwartz partnered with Nadiya Hussain, to co-create nine products, including recipe kits, mixes and seasonings.

=== Queen Elizabeth II's 90th birthday ===
Hussain was commissioned by Buckingham Palace to bake Elizabeth II's cake as part of her 90th birthday celebrations. Hussain chose to bake an orange drizzle cake with orange curd and orange buttercream.

== Personal life ==
At the age of 20, Hussain married Abdal Hussain, whom she had only met twice before, in an arranged marriage; they had married in a religious traditional ceremony in Bangladesh and only legally registered their union in the UK in December 2018. The couple have three children: two sons, born in 2006 and 2007, and a daughter, born in 2010.

Hussain is an ambassador for Starlight Children's Foundation, which supports the lives of seriously ill children and is also a WaterAid ambassador. Hussain has shown her support for Armistice Day by wearing a 'poppy headscarf', designed to commemorate the number of Muslim soldiers who fought in World War One, as well as promote the wearing of the poppy amongst British Muslims. In 2018, Hussain became a brand ambassador for Swarovski on a campaign focusing on female empowerment.

Hussain has suffered from panic attacks throughout her life. She contributed a baking recipe for the YoungMinds mental health charity's HelloYellow day, for World Mental Health Day on 10 October 2018.

She was appointed Member of the Order of the British Empire (MBE) in the 2020 New Year Honours for services to broadcasting and the culinary arts.

In October 2024, Hussain revealed her diagnosis of two autoimmune diseases, emphasising the importance of self-care and listening to one's body.

== Awards and nominations ==
Year	Award	Category	Work	Result
2017	National Television Awards (NTA)	Factual Entertainment	The Chronicles of Nadiya	Nominated
2017	Royal Television Society (RTS)	Breakthrough Star	The Chronicles of Nadiya	Nominated
2017	Grierson Awards	Best Documentary Presenter	The Chronicles of Nadiya	Nominated
2017	Women in Film & Television (UK)	Presenter Award	The Chronicles of Nadiya	Won
2017	Diversity in Media Awards	TV Programme of the Year	The Chronicles of Nadiya	Nominated
2017	British Book Awards	Children's Book of the Year	Bake Me a Story	Nominated
2018	RTS West of England Awards	Factual Entertainment	Nadiya's British Food Adventure	Won
2018	Fortnum & Mason Food and Drink Awards	Programme	Nadiya's British Food Adventure	Won
2018	Fortnum & Mason Food and Drink Awards	Personality of the Year	Nadiya's British Food Adventure	Won
2018	National Book Award	Food And Drink Book Of The Year	Nadiya's Family Favourites	Nominated
2019	Brand & Lifestyle Licensing Awards	Best Brand Licensed Homewares Product or Range	Make Life Colourful Range from BlissHome	Won
2019	Fortnum & Mason Food and Drink Awards	Programme	Nadiya's Asian Odyssey	Won
2021	British Book Awards	Non-fiction: Lifestyle	Nadiya Bakes	Nominated

== Filmography ==
Television

Year	Title	Channel	Role
2015	The Great British Bake Off	BBC One	Winner
2015, 2016—	The One Show	BBC One	Reporter
2015—	Saturday Kitchen	BBC One	Guest chef
2016	Loose Women	ITV	Occasional panellist
2016	The Chronicles of Nadiya	BBC One	Presenter
2016	Junior Bake Off	CBBC	Judge
2017	Nadiya's British Food Adventure	BBC Two	Presenter
2017	The Big Family Cooking Showdown	BBC Two	Co-presenter
2018	Nadiya's Family Favourites	BBC Two	Presenter
2018	Nadiya's Party Feasts	BBC Two	Presenter
2018	Nadiya's Asian Odyssey	BBC One	Presenter
2019	Nadiya: Anxiety and Me	BBC One	Presenter
2019	Nadiya's Time to Eat	BBC Two / Netflix	Presenter
2020	Nadiya Bakes	BBC Two/ Netflix	Presenter
2020	Nadiya's American Melting Pot	BBC One	Presenter
2020	The Gruffalo and Me: The Remarkable Julia Donaldson	BBC One	Interviewed Guest
2021	Remarkable Places to Eat	BBC Two	Herself
2021	Fast Flavours	BBC Two	Herself
2022	Nadiya's Everyday Baking	BBC Two	Herself
2023	Nadiya's Simple Spices	BBC Two	Herself
2024	Nadiya's Cook Once, Eat Twice	BBC Two	Herself

Key
†	Denotes series that have not yet been released

== Bibliography ==
Category	Year	Title	Publisher	Publication Date	ISBN	Tie-in TV Series
Biographies	2019	Finding My Voice	Headline Home	Oct 2019	ISBN 9781472259967	
Cookery	2016	Nadiya's Kitchen	Michael Joseph (Penguin Books)	June 2016	ISBN 9780241453247	
Cookery	2017	Nadiya's British Food Adventure	Michael Joseph (Penguin Books)	July 2017	ISBN 9780718187668	✔
Cookery	2018	Nadiya's Family Favourites	Michael Joseph (Penguin Books)	June 2018	ISBN 9780241348994	✔
Cookery	2019	Time to Eat	Michael Joseph (Penguin Books)	July 2019	ISBN 9780241396599	✔
Cookery	2020	Nadiya Bakes	Michael Joseph (Penguin Books)	July 2020	ISBN 9780241396612	✔
Cookery	2021	Nadiya's Fast Flavours	Michael Joseph (Penguin Books)	Oct 2021	ISBN 9780241453223	✔
Cookery	2022	Nadiya's Everyday Baking	Michael Joseph (Penguin Books)	Sep 2022	ISBN 9780241453247	✔
Cookery	2023	Nadiya's Simple Spices	Michael Joseph (Penguin Books)	Sep 2023	ISBN 9780241620007	✔
Cookery	2024	Cook Once, Eat Twice	Michael Joseph (Penguin Books)	Sep 2024	ISBN 9780241620052	✔
Cookery	2025	Rooza	Michael Joseph (Penguin Books)	Jan 2025	ISBN 9780241678237	
Cookery	2026	Nadiya’s Quick Comforts	Michael Joseph (Penguin Books)	Feb 2026	ISBN 9780241753590	
Children's	2016	Nadiya's Bake Me a Story	Hodder Children's Books	Sep 2016	ISBN 9781444933277	
Children's	2017	Nadiya's Bake Me a Festive Story	Hodder Children's Books	Oct 2017	ISBN 9781444939613	
Children's	2018	Nadiya's Bake Me a Celebration Story	Hodder Children's Books	Sep 2018	ISBN 9781444939583	
Children's	2019	My Monster and Me	Hodder Children's Books	Oct 2019	ISBN 9781444946437	
Fiction	2017	The Secret Lives of the Amir Sisters	Harlequin	Jan 2017	ISBN 9780008192266	
Fiction	2019	The Fall and Rise of the Amir Sisters	Harlequin	Jan 2019	ISBN 9780008192310	
Fiction	2020	The Hopes and Triumphs of the Amir Sisters	Harlequin	Jan 2020	ISBN 9780008192389	
