= Listed buildings in Byland with Wass =

Byland with Wass is a civil parish in the county of North Yorkshire, England. It contains six listed buildings that are recorded in the National Heritage List for England. Of these, one is listed at Grade I, the highest of the three grades, and the others are at Grade II, the lowest grade. The parish contains the villages of Byland Abbey and Wass and the surrounding countryside. The listed buildings consist of a ruined abbey, its ruined gatehouse, two farmhouses, a public house and a water fountain.

== Key ==
Grade	Criteria
I	Buildings of exceptional interest, sometimes considered to be internationally important
II	Buildings of national importance and special interest

== Buildings ==
Name and location	Photograph	Date	Notes	Grade
Byland Abbey; 54.20325°N 1.15921°W		Late 12th century	An abbey church and monastic buildings, now a ruin, in limestone. There are substantial remains of the church, including the west front standing almost to its full height. The monastic building ruins have a height of about 5 metres (16 ft) in places.	I
Abbey Gatehouse; 54.20408°N 1.16197°W		Late 12th century	The gatehouse to Byland Abbey is in limestone and is now a ruin. The remains consist of moulded imposts supporting moulded capitals carrying a round arch with two moulded orders and a hood mould. Attached to it is a wall containing a blocked doorway with a pointed arch and a moulded surround.	II
College Farmhouse; 54.20383°N 1.16242°W		Early 18th century	The farmhouse is in limestone, and has a roof with gable coping and a shaped kneeler on the right. There are two storeys, four bays, and a single-storey rear cross-wing. The window above the doorway is blocked, and the other windows are sashes.	II
Lund Farmhouse; 54.20986°N 1.15571°W	—	Mid to late 18th century	The farmhouse is in limestone, and has a Welsh slate roof with gable coping and shaped kneelers. There are two storeys, two bays, and a single-storey extension on the left. The doorway has a divided fanlight, and the windows are sashes with sandstone lintels.	II
The Abbey Inn; 54.20349°N 1.16035°W		Early to mid 19th century	The public house is in limestone and has a hipped Welsh slate roof. There are two storeys, three bays and a rear cross-wing. The central doorway has a divided fanlight, the windows are sashes in wooden architraves, and all the openings have stone lintels.	II
Water Fountain; 54.20642°N 1.14920°W		1870	The water fountain has an initialled and dated cast iron trough. Its surround is in limestone and has a U-shaped plan. The trough is fed by a stream of water from a carved lion's mouth.	II
