= Wass, North Yorkshire =

Village in North Yorkshire

Coordinates: 54°12′24″N 1°09′03″W

Wass
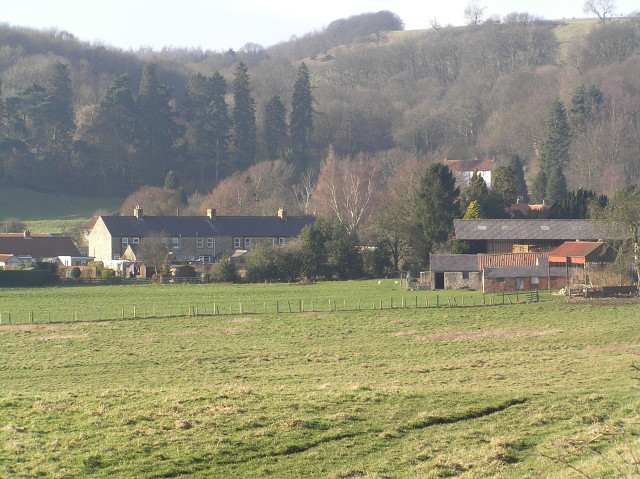
- Wass seen from the east

- Location within North Yorkshire
- OS grid reference: SE555793
- Civil parish: Byland with Wass
- Unitary authority: North Yorkshire
- Ceremonial county: North Yorkshire
- Region: Yorkshire and the Humber
- Country: England
- Sovereign state: United Kingdom
- Post town: YORK
- Postcode district: YO61
- Dialling code: 01347
- Police: North Yorkshire
- Fire: North Yorkshire
- Ambulance: Yorkshire
- UK Parliament: Thirsk and Malton

Wass is a village in the civil parish of Byland with Wass, in North Yorkshire, England, in the North York Moors National Park. A short distance from the village lie the ruins of Byland Abbey. Despite the small size of the village (population about 100) there is a pub, the Stapylton Arms. It is at the foot of Wass Bank and has views of the surrounding countryside. It was part of the Ryedale district between 1974 and 2023. It is now administered by North Yorkshire Council.

The toponym probably means 'fords', from Middle English wathes and ultimately from Old Norse vath. The village is at the junction of several small streams. Another suggestion is that the name derives from the Old English Wæsse, meaning swamp.

Wass was formerly a township in the parish of Kilburn, in 1866 Wass became a separate civil parish, on 1 24 March 1887 the parish was abolished and merged with Byland Abbey to form "Byland with Wass". In 1881 the parish had a population of 113.

To the east of the village is Wass Grange, in which building the monks of Byland Abbey stored their grain before the Dissolution of the Monasteries. In May 2009 the nuns of Stanbrook Abbey, in Worcestershire, re-established themselves in a purpose-built convent near Wass.

== See also ==
- Listed buildings in Byland with Wass
