= Ayisha Malik =

British author

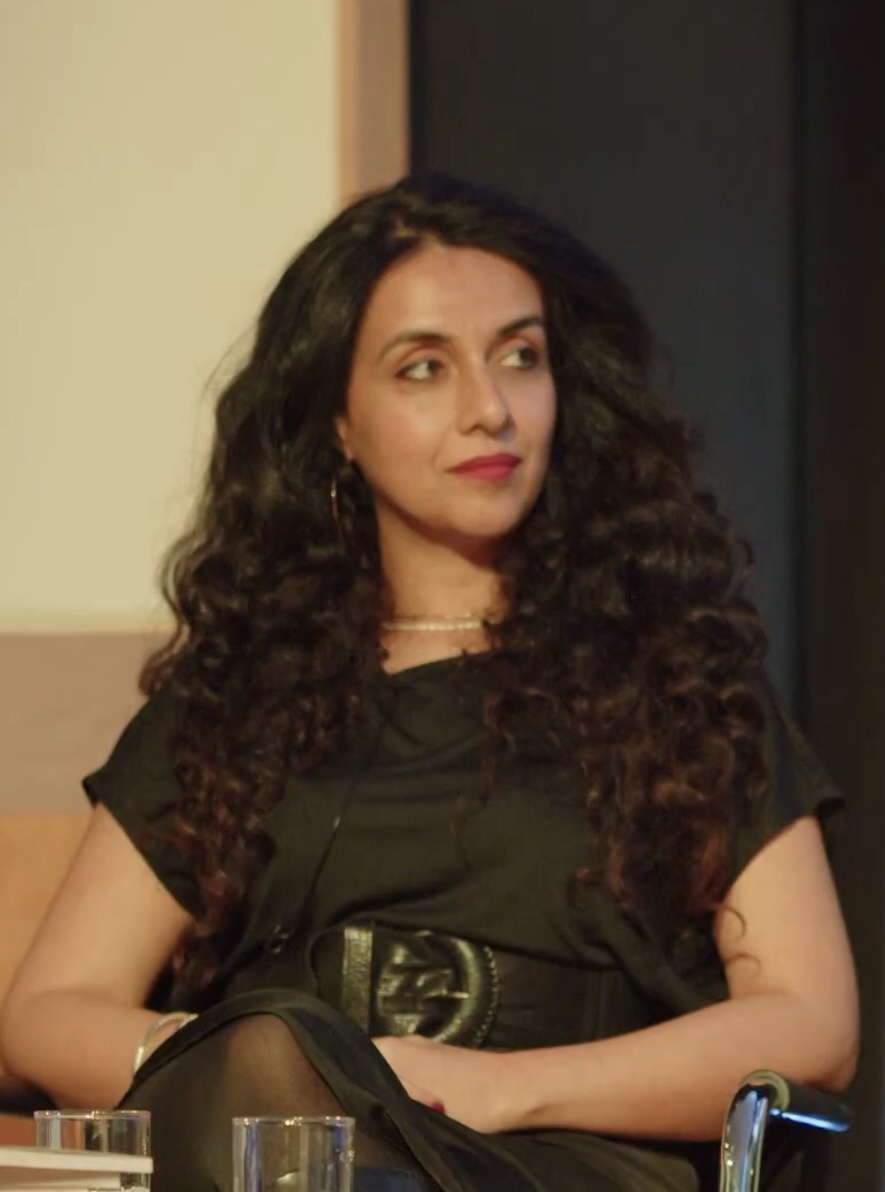
- Malik in 2022
- Born: London
- Education: Kingston University
- Writing career
- Language: English
- Genres: Contemporary fiction, Romance

Ayisha Malik is a British author. Her debut novel Sofia Khan is Not Obliged was published in 2015. The sequel, The Other Half of Happiness, was published in 2017. Malik was a consultant for Nadiya Hussain's novel The Secret Lives of the Amir Sisters.

== Early life and education ==
Malik was born in London and has lived and worked in the city all of her life. She studied English literature at Kingston University and completed a master's degree in creative writing.

== Literary career ==
Malik worked as a publicist for a Penguin Random House, like the protagonist in her first novel Sofia Khan is Not Obliged who works for a publishing house. She was selected as a WH Smith Fresh Talent pick in 2016. Her debut novel Sofia Khan is Not Obliged was optioned for television.

Malik is Muslim and draws on her experiences as a Muslim woman in her writing. Her two novels focus on Muslim dating and marriage.

== Bibliography ==
- 2015: Sofia Khan is Not Obliged, Twenty7, ISBN 9781785770036
- 2017: The Other Half of Happiness, Bonnier Zaffre. ISBN 9781785760730
- 2019: This Green and Pleasant Land, Bonnier. ISBN 1785767534, 9781785767531
- 2022: Sofia Khan and the Baby Blues, Headline Publishing Group, ISBN 9781472284570
- 2022: The Movement, Headline Publishing Group, ISBN 9781472279316
