= Sofia Khan is Not Obliged =

2015 novel by Ayisha Malik

Sofia Khan Is Not Obliged
- First edition
- Author: Ayisha Malik
- Language: English
- Genre: Romance Novel
- Published: 2015 by Twenty7 Books
- Publication place: United Kingdom

Sofia Khan is Not Obliged is the first fictional work by Ayisha Malik. The text was published by Twenty7 Books in 2015 and is a romance fiction that explores the trials and tribulations of dating as a young Muslim woman living in London.

== Synopsis ==
The book follows the eponymous heroine Sofia Khan through the difficulties of navigating the dating world as a Muslim girl living in London whilst working in publishing. The narrative charts her various different interactions with her love interests, beginning with her first boyfriend Imran. Imran asks her to move in with his family, in a house connected to theirs via a connecting door, a request which earns him the nickname 'hole-in-the-wall' and subsequently marks the end of their relationship. Sofia's next love interest is Naim, but again things fail to work out. On the tube one day, Sofia is called a 'terrorist' by a man she accidentally bumps into, but the train leaves before she is able to do anything about it.

When she gets to her meeting, the publishing company she works for have asked Sofia to write a Muslim dating manual, documenting her dating experiences as a British Muslim. She is given a sizeable advance on the book. The book also follows her friends' experience too, such as her friend Suj's relationship with a black man and her friend Hannah's decision to enter a polygamous relationship as a second wife.

She has struck up an unlikely friendship with her tattooed Irish neighbour, Conall, who is proving to be an unlikely source of strength during these trying times. Out of the blue her father has a heart attack and Sofia decides given her lack of dating success to marry Imran after all, as she feels this will make her family happy.

Preparations are made for the marriage, Sofia tells Conall that she is to be married and he reveals he is going to Afghanistan and will be away for three months. Sofia is set to be married but then has a conversation with Imran where he reveals that he wants her to take his name, a notion she firmly rejects. This sparks a realisation in Sofia that this union is not what she wants, and she calls off the wedding then without telling her family. Sofia has a meeting with Brammers at the publishing house, who informs her that her book needs more sex in it, as this is what the reading public want. When Sofia expresses her reluctance, Brammers explains that some sex will distract the reader from questioning why Sofia chooses to live her life the way that she does. She is then at Conall's when the news breaks about the failed engagement and the family descends into uproar. The book then jumps forward to Sofia's father having died.

After things have settled somewhat, Sofia is at Waterloo station when she spots the man who originally called her a terrorist on the tube, she follows the man she terms 'the Racist' onto the tube and sits in a seat she could see him making a beeline for. The man responds to this by calling her a 'Paki bitch'. An older lady and a man both come to her defence and make him grudgingly apologise. Sofia then chases him down and calls him a 'cunt' and proceeds to punch him in the face.

Conall emails to let her know he will not be in Afghanistan for much longer as he has met a documentary filmmaker named Hamida and is going with her to Pakistan to make a film. Sofia then turns up at Brammers' office and says she no longer wishes to write this book, and is promptly informed that according to contract she has to deliver a book in October. She says that she will but it will not be this particular book and then hands in her notice. Conall comes back and asks her to come out to Pakistan, she accepts much to the chagrin of her male relatives who inform her that this is not the way women in their family behave. Her mother intercedes on her behalf and informs them that times have changed. Sofia gets on the plane with Conall, and finds out on the plane that he has converted to Islam, something that is especially significant given Sofia's previous resolution that she wouldn't consider dating someone who didn't share her faith as they wouldn't understand her life. The first book ends with the pair embarking on their journey together.

== Reception ==
Scholars from the University of Malaysia have recognised Sofia Khan is Not Obliged for its attention to the Islamic principle of 'haya', relating to one's modesty and how such modesty is enacted through the protagonist's decision to wear hijab. Rashedun Nahar, Zalina Mohd Lazim, Noraini Md. Yusof have also claimed that the story of romantic Muslim relationships in Sofia Khan Is Not Obliged, has become representative of all 'diasporic Muslim women'.

Academics have also suggested that the Chick Lit genre has taken a new form, as seen in Sofia Khan Is Not Obliged, which 'focuses on Muslim dating and marriage'. It has been compared to Helen Fielding's Bridget Jones's Diary both in its structure and content. Sofia's attention to the limitations enforced upon authors by publishing houses and editors is considered by Claire Chambers, Richard Phillips and Nafhesa Ali et al. as Malik's own social comment on the publishing industry. The representation of non-heteronormative sexualities within the book has been criticised for being minimal and attached to a melancholic narrative.

Sarah Ilot has analysed how Malik's use of humour in Sofia Khan Is Not Obliged functions in the subversion of racial and gender-based power dynamics and stereotypes.

== Awards ==
- Sofia Khan Is Not Obliged received WH Smith's Fresh Talent Pick Award in 2016.
- Sofia Khan Is Not Obliged was chosen by CityRead London as their 2019 promotion.
