= Nadiya's British Food Adventure =

British television series

- Genre: Cookery
- Directed by: Martha Delap
- Presented by: Nadiya Hussain
- Composer: Douglas Black Heaton
- Country of origin: United Kingdom
- Original language: English
- No. of series: 1
- No. of episodes: 8

Production
- Executive producer: Paolo Proto
- Running time: 30 minutes
- Production company: BBC Studios

Original release
- Network: BBC Two
- Release: 17 July – 4 September 2017

Nadiya's British Food Adventure is a British television cookery show. The series is presented by Nadiya Hussain.

Nadiya's British Food Adventure sees Hussain undertake a road trip around Britain, visiting a different region from the Highlands of Scotland to the coasts of Devon and Dorset, to uncover some of the country's most exciting food pioneers.

The eight-part series aired on BBC Two in 2017 and is produced by BBC Studios. The first episode aired on 17 July 2017 where Hussain visited an Oxfordshire farm and cooks her hosts a dish with their own produce.

== Awards and nominations ==
Year	Award	Category	Result
2018	RTS West of England Awards	Factual Entertainment	Won
2018	Fortnum & Mason Food and Drink Awards	Programme	Won

== Ratings ==
Episode Viewing figures from BARB.

Episode	Episode theme	Broadcast date	Ratings	Weekly channel rank
1	Home Counties	17 July 2017	2.62m	1
2	Peak District	24 July 2017	2.66m	1
3	East of England	31 July 2017	2.16m	4
4	London	7 August 2017	1.74m	9
5	Yorkshire	14 August 2017	2.16m	4
6	Scotland	21 August 2017	2.1m	4
7	West Country	28 August 2017	1.82m	6
8	Wales	4 September 2017	1.95m	3

== Book ==
A tie-in cookery book was published by Michael Joseph in July 2017 and topped charts for Hardback Non-Fiction.

== See also ==
- Nadiya's Family Favourites
