= Nadiya's Asian Odyssey =

British television cooking show

- Presented by: Nadiya Hussain
- Country of origin: United Kingdom
- Original language: English
- No. of series: 1
- No. of episodes: 2

Production
- Executive producers: Martha Delap and Anna Miralis
- Running time: 60 minutes
- Production company: Wall To Wall West (Bristol) production

Original release
- Network: BBC One
- Release: 3 December – 10 December 2018

Nadiya's Asian Odyssey is a two-part British television cookery show presented by Nadiya Hussain.

After taking a DNA-based genealogy test which linked her heritage to Thailand, Cambodia and Nepal, as well as Bangladesh, Nadiya travelled to those countries to explore their food and cuisine and her heritage.

== Description ==
In the first part, screened on 3 December 2018, Nadiya travelled to Cambodia, where she visited a French pastry school for local disadvantaged girls, sat with workers descaling and filleting tiny fish to make the fish paste prahok and assisted in preparing palm sugar. She also spent time in Thailand, where she tried eating durian and insects.

== Reception ==
The program was well received, with one reviewer saying that "as a document of personal growth and discovery, it was charming and inspiring." Another reviewer found it "a joy, made only more so .. by the admission of truths. Picturesque ways of life are hard. Ours aren’t sustainable. Not all dishes work, but sharing food, sharing cultures and approaching them with an equally hearty appetite always will."

In 2019, Nadiya's Asian Odyssey won Best programme at the Fortnum & Mason Food and Drink Awards.
