= Mount Snever Observatory =

Building in Oldstead, North Yorkshire, England

Coordinates: 54°13′02″N 1°10′40″W

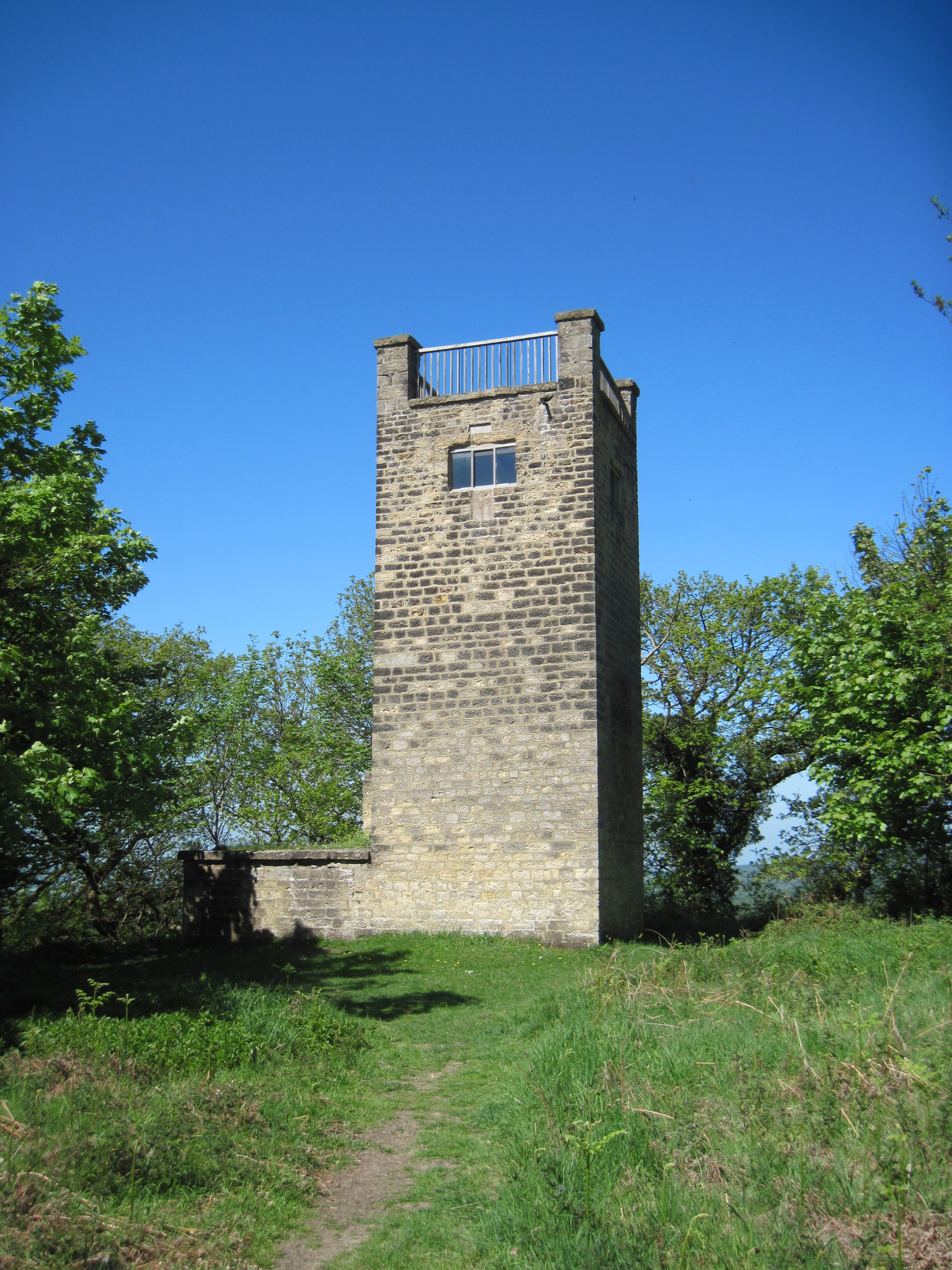
The building, in 2012

Mount Snever Observatory is a historic building in Oldstead, a village in North Yorkshire, in England.

The observation tower was constructed in 1838, in part to commemorate the Coronation of Queen Victoria. It was commissioned by John Wormald, and built by J. Dodds atop the Snever Point hill. While digging foundations for the building, a human skeleton was discovered. Wormald died in 1848, and later in the century the building was opened to the public, although it fell into decay. It was restored in the late 20th century by Noel Appleby, and again in about 2000, but is disused and kept locked. Gwyn Headley describes the building as "rather austere". The building was grade II listed in 1986.

The observatory is housed in a square limestone tower about 35 feet (11 m) in height, with a platform on the front. The doorway has a massive stone lintel, it is flanked by buttresses, and over it is an inscription. Above is a three-light fixed window, a wooden parapet, and coped angle turrets. There is another inscription on the rear.

The inscription on the front is adapted from Alexander Pope's poem "Windsor-Forest": "Here hills and waving groves a scene display And part admit and part exclude the day See rich industry smiling on the plains And peace and plenty tell VICTORIA reigns! Happy the MAN who to these shades retires Whom NATURE charms and whom the muse inspires Who wandering thoughtful in this silent wood Attends the duties of the wise and good To observe a mean, be to himself a friend To follow NATURE and regard his end".

== See also ==
- Listed buildings in Oldstead
