= Nadiya's Family Favourites =

- Intertitle of the series's first episode
- Genre: Cookery
- Presented by: Nadiya Hussain
- Country of origin: United Kingdom
- Original language: English
- No. of series: 1
- No. of episodes: 8

Production
- Executive producer: Pete Lawrence
- Running time: 30 minutes
- Production company: Hungry Gap Productions

Original release
- Network: BBC Two
- Release: 16 July – 10 September 2018

Nadiya's Family Favourites is a British television cookery show presented by Nadiya Hussain.

The series shows Nadiya out and about with specially-filmed inserts speaking to family and friends about how cooking fits in with modern life, as well as meals being prepared in the kitchen.

The eight-part series first aired on BBC Two in July 2018. It was reported that the new series was the main reason for Nadiya Hussain giving up her role as a presenter in another BBC cookery programme, The Big Family Cooking Showdown.

In each themed episode, four recipes are featured. Many of these are the Hussain "family's favourite recipes". The show attempts to strip back the idealism of other popular TV cookery shows and deals in the manageable, not the unobtainable.

Nadiya's quirky recipes include "deep fried carrot cake pakoras".

== Book ==
A tie-in cookery book was published by Michael Joseph in June 2018 and was nominated at the National Book Award's under 'Food And Drink Book Of The Year' category.

== Reception ==
London Evening Standard's Guy Pewsey said "In Hussain, the BBC has found its new Eliza Doolittle, the plucky everywoman ripe for uplifting transformation to TV's upper echelons. The discovery has paid off: the programme is sweet, fun and informative and will continue to cement her status as a national treasure". "I’m addicted to the show" claimed Matt Bayliss of Daily Express. In The Times, Carol Midley found the show "looked like something from an interior design magazine" and regarding Hussain, she said "In a quiet, unpretentious way she makes it look easy. I wonder if it makes those professional, super-rich celebrity chefs sweat, just a little?".

== Episode ==
Episode	Episode theme
1	Family Day Out
2	Family Get Together
3	Hustle & Bustle
4	Manic Weekdays
5	Nothing in the House
6	People to Stay
7	Treat Days
8	Wind Down Weekends

=== Nadiya’s Party Feasts ===
A one-off special episode, titled Nadiya’s Party Feasts aired in December. The special saw Nadiya hosting her own party for her friends and family, as well as traveling the UK meeting people who have their own reasons to celebrate.
