= The Big Family Cooking Showdown =

UK television program

- Genre: Cooking; Reality competition
- Presented by: Zoe Ball (series 1); Nadiya Hussain (series 1); Angellica Bell (series 2); Tommy Banks (series 2)
- Judges: Giorgio Locatelli (series 1); Rosemary Shrager (series 1); Angellica Bell (series 2); Tommy Banks (series 2)
- Country of origin: United Kingdom
- Original language: English
- No. of series: 2
- No. of episodes: 26

Production
- Production locations: Cooking Showdown Kitchen: The Main Barn at The Quadrangle Trust, Shoreham, Kent (Series 1); Wales (Series 2)
- Running time: 60 minutes
- Production company: Voltage TV

Original release
- Network: BBC Two
- Release: 15 August 2017 – 2 November 2018

The Big Family Cooking Showdown, often referred to as simply Cooking Showdown or BFCS, is a BBC team cooking competition. The first season was hosted by Great British Bake Off winner Nadiya Hussain and Zoe Ball. Each week, two teams of three family members competed in three challenges, judged by Michelin starred chef Giorgio Locatelli and cookery teacher Rosemary Shrager. The winners in each of eight heats moved on to the semi-finals, consisting of three episodes. The three semi-final winners then progressed to the final episode where the winning family was selected. The Big Family Cooking Showdown premiered on BBC Two on Tuesday, 15 August 2017, then moved to Thursday evenings on 31 August to avoid a scheduling conflict with The Great British Bake Off on Channel 4.

On 9 May 2018, the BBC announced that the show would return for a second season of 14 episodes airing in a new slot of 7pm. The second season aired multiple episodes per week, beginning on 15 October 2018. The show returned with a refreshed style and modified format, and without any of the original line-up of presenters or judges featured in the first series. Presenter and Celebrity MasterChef winner Angellica Bell was joined by Michelin starred chef Tommy Banks to host and co-judge the second series. After viewership and ratings fell below expectations, BBC announced that the show would be cancelled.

== Production and Format ==
In both the first and second season of the competition, each team consists of three family members. However, otherwise the two seasons of the show are somewhat distinct in terms of production style and format.

=== Season One ===
The first season of the series, The Cooking Showdown kitchen is located in the main barn at the Quadrangle Trust, near Shoreham in Kent. Each heat featured two teams, while each semi-final and the final featured three teams. There were 12 episodes in total, and one episode aired per week.

Season one featured two judges, Giorgio Locatelli and Rosemary Shrager, and two presenters Nadiya Hussain and Zoe Ball. Only one of the presenters would travel to the home visit challenge, which took place in the contestants' homes. However, both presenters were present in the barn, except for the final episode, which didn't feature Zoe Ball.

==== Heats ====
In each episode, two teams comprising three family members competed in three time-limited rounds. At the end of the three rounds, a winner was selected, who moved on to one of a series of semi-final rounds.

- Round 1: The £10 Challenge (1 hour and 15 minutes): In the £10 Challenge, the teams must prepare two courses for four on a budget.
- Round 2: Home Visits Challenge (1 hour and 30 minutes): Each team cooks and serves a main course and a dessert for the judges in their own home kitchen.
- Round 3: Impress the Neighbours Challenge (2 hours and 15 minutes): The teams returned to the barn to create their finest starter and a main course, with no budget.

==== Semi-finals ====
- What's in the Fridge? tests the families creativity as home cooks. The judges provide a limited range of ingredients. Each team has 1 hour to cook a main course for 4 people.
- For the Perfect Puddings challenge, each judge "carefully select a firm family favourite" for the teams to make in 1 hour and 20 minutes.
- The Nation's Favourite With a Twist challenge asks families "for their unique take on a British classic." The teams have 2 hours for this challenge.

All three challenges were staged in the Cooking Showdown barn.

==== Final ====
For the final, the teams faced "one long, continuous challenge." Each family was challenged to "prepare food for a big family get-together, including nibbles, main courses, and desserts."

=== Season Two ===
The second season was filmed in Wales. All elements of show were shot in a studio kitchen and did not feature a challenge in the contestants' own homes. A total of 16 families took part in the competition. There were 14 episodes in total of the second season, which were aired across three weeks. Up to five episodes would air per week on the weeknights.

In each episode, the teams are given two tasks - one they have had time to practise at home, the other a complete surprise, testing their collective ability to work together and think on their feet.

This season didn't see a return of the quartet of two judges and two presenters, but rather the duo consisting of judge Tommy Banks and Angellica Bell, who also judged the contestants' cooking, as well as narrating the show.

==== Heats ====
In contrast to just two families in the first season, four families take part in each of the four heats. However, each heat runs across two episodes. At the end of the first episode of the heat, one of the four families would be eliminated. The remaining three families returned the following day, which concluded with one more family being sent out of the competition. The remaining two families would compete against each other along with two other heat-winning families in one of two the play-offs. The winners of the play-offs proceeded to the finals.

- Round 1: The £10 Challenge: In season one this was a pre-prepared challenge. However in season two, the contestants have to make a £10 meal for a family of four with a surprise selection of ingredients 'purchased' in studio, if teams exceeded their budget they had to return ingredients.
- Round 2: Nation's Favourite with a Twist: Each team cooks a popular dish with their own personal take. Families are aware of this dish in advance of the challenge.
- Round 3: The Head-to-Head Challenge: in which families have to nominate one member to cook on their own. The dish is a surprise to the contestant, however they have the option of following an easy, medium or hard recipe, or alternatively they can go off-recipe using a 'smörgåsbord' of extra ingredients. The non-participating family members secretly watch from another room, commenting of their family member's progress.
- Round 4: Two Key Ingredients Challenge: Families cook a meal around two star ingredients selected by the judges. They have knowledge of these ingredients prior to appearing on the show.

== Results summary ==
=== Season One ===
| Episode | Family No. 1 | Family No. 2 | Winning family | Broadcast date |
Heats
| 1 | The Charles family | The Marks family | The Charles family | 15 August 2017 |
| 2 | The Dawes family | The Karim family | The Karim family | 22 August 2017 |
| 3 | The Hilliard family | The Pigott family | The Pigott family | 31 August 2017 |
| 4 | The Gangotra family | The Massaccesi family | The Gangotra family | 7 September 2017 |
| 5 | The Ayoubi family | The Herbert family | The Ayoubi family | 14 September 2017 |
| 6 | The Codougan family | The King family | The King family | 21 September 2017 |
| 7 | The Bellamore family | The Bellamy family | The Bellamore family | 28 September 2017 |
| 8 | The Boyes family | The Rignall family | The Boyes family | 5 October 2017 |

| Episode | Family No. 1 | Family No. 2 | Family No. 3 | Winning family | Broadcast date |
Semi-finals
| 9 | The Charles family | The Herbert family | The Karim family | The Charles family | 12 October 2017 |
| 10 | The Boyes family | The Gangotra family | The King family | The Gangotra family | 19 October 2017 |
| 11 | The Bellamore family | The Massaccesi family | The Pigott family | The Pigott family | 26 October 2017 |
Final
| 12 | The Charles family | The Gangotra family | The Pigott family | The Gangotra family | 2 November 2017 |

Notes:
- In the first semi-final, the Herbert family competed following the withdrawal of the Ayoubi family.
- At the beginning of the third semi-final, the Massaccesi family were revealed as the wildcard family.

=== Season Two ===
| Episode and type | Family No. 1 | Family No. 2 | Family No. 3 | Family No. 4 | Dropping family | Broadcast date |
|---|---|---|---|---|---|---|
| 1 – heat | The Penmans | The Ambimbola-Younges | The Whites from Hampshire | The Stones | The Stones | |
| 2 – heat | The Penmans | The Ambimbola-Younges | The Whites from Hampshire | | The Penmans | |
| 3 – heat | The Whites from Selkirk | The Gohil and Al-Sheiks | The Lees | The Butlands | The Butlands | |
| 4 – heat | The Whites from Selkirk | The Gohil and Al-Sheiks | The Lees | | The Lees | |
| 5 – playoff | The Ambimbola-Younges | The Whites from Hampshire | The Whites from Selkirk | The Gohil and Al-Sheiks | the Whites from Selkirk, The Ambimbola-Younges | |
| 6 – heat | The Bonehams | The Antonious | The Birds | The Fasayes | The Birds | |
| 7 – heat | The Bonehams | The Antonious | The Fasayes | | The Fasayes | |
| 8 – heat | The Whitakers | The Varmas | The Walker-Kings | The Mistrys | The Walker-Kings | |
| 9 – heat | The Whitakers | The Varmas | The Mistrys | | The Varmas | |
| 10 – playoff | The Bonehams | The Antonious | The Whitakers | The Mistrys | The Bonehams and the Antonious | |
| 11 – semifinal | The Whitakers | The Mistrys | The Whites from Hampshire | The Gohil and Al-Sheiks | The Gohil and Al-Sheiks | |

| Episode | Family No. 1 | Family No. 2 | Family No. 3 | Winning family | Broadcast date |
Semi-finals
| 12 | The Whitakers | The Mistrys | The Whites from Hampshire | The Whitakers | |
| 13 | The Mistrys | The Whites from Hampshire | | The Mistrys | |
| 14 | The Whitakers | The Mistrys | | The Mistrys | |

== Ratings ==
Official episode viewing figures are from BARB.

| Episode no. | Airdate | 7-day viewers (millions) | 28-day viewers (millions) | BBC Two weekly ranking | BBC iPlayer requests |
|---|---|---|---|---|---|
| 1 | 15 August 2017 | 2.15 | 2.25 | 5 | TBC |
| 2 | 22 August 2017 | 1.83 | 1.93 | 6 | TBC |
| 3 | 31 August 2017 | 1.56 | 1.64 | 10 | TBC |
| 4 | 7 September 2017 | 1.53 | 1.58 | 14 | TBC |
| 5 | 14 September 2017 | 1.46 | 1.55 | 12 | TBC |
| 6 | 21 September 2017 | 1.39 | 1.44 | 12 | TBC |
| 7 | 28 September 2017 | 1.55 | 1.58 | 16 | TBC |
| 8 | 5 October 2017 | 1.47 | 1.51 | 19 | TBC |
| 9 | 12 October 2017 | 1.37 | 1.40 | 27 | TBC |
| 10 | 19 October 2017 | 1.34 | 1.36 | 22 | TBC |
| 11 | 26 October 2017 | 1.32 | 1.36 | 22 | TBC |
| 12 | 2 November 2017 | 1.96 | 1.98 | 6 | TBC |

== Reception ==
About the location, Sally Newall, writing for The Independent said, "Instead of the Bake Off tent, there's a barn conversion with a country-kitchen-meets-early-Noughties warehouse-conversion vibe. There is lots of wood, exposed brick, shiny copper lampshades and those letters with light bulbs that you tend to see at weddings. Michael Hogan, writing for The Daily Telegraph described the kitchen as a "swish barn, kitted out in twee, shabby chic style to resemble something from a glossy interiors magazine." Stuart Heritage of The Guardian called it "Bland, awkward and awful".

=== Scheduling conflict ===
After Channel 4's announcement that they will broadcast The Great British Bake Off on Tuesdays opposite The Big Family Cooking Show, the BBC moved the show to Thursday to avoid a scheduling conflict. The BBC said, "Channel 4's decision to move Bake Off from its long-term traditional Wednesday slot will be a surprise to many viewers who may see this as a cynical move. We never intended for our new cookery show to clash with theirs. There is room for both and we don't, in this instance, see any public value in two public service broadcasters going head-to-head in this way."
