= Byland with Wass =

Civil parish in North Yorkshire, England

Coordinates: 54.206°N 1.155°W

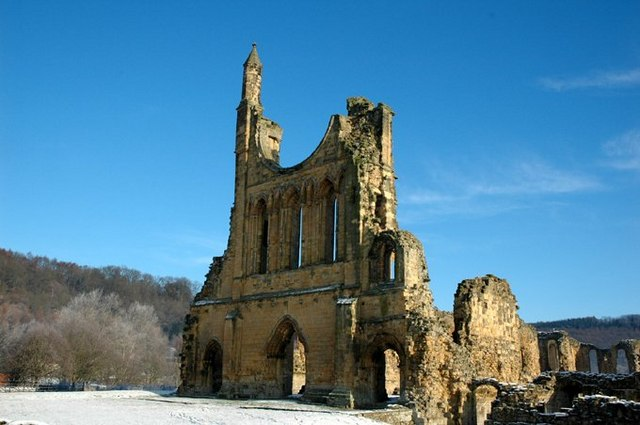
The west front of Byland Abbey

Byland with Wass is a civil parish in the county of North Yorkshire, England. According to the 2001 census it had a population of 120, increasing to an estimated 160 in 2015. (At the 2011 Census the parish was included with the parish of Oldstead and not counted separately.) It covers Byland Abbey and Wass, in the North York Moors, and shares a parish council with Oldstead.

It was part of the Ryedale district between 1974 and 2023. It is now administered by North Yorkshire Council.

== See also ==
- Listed buildings in Byland with Wass
