= Byland Abbey =

Ruined monastery in North Yorkshire, England

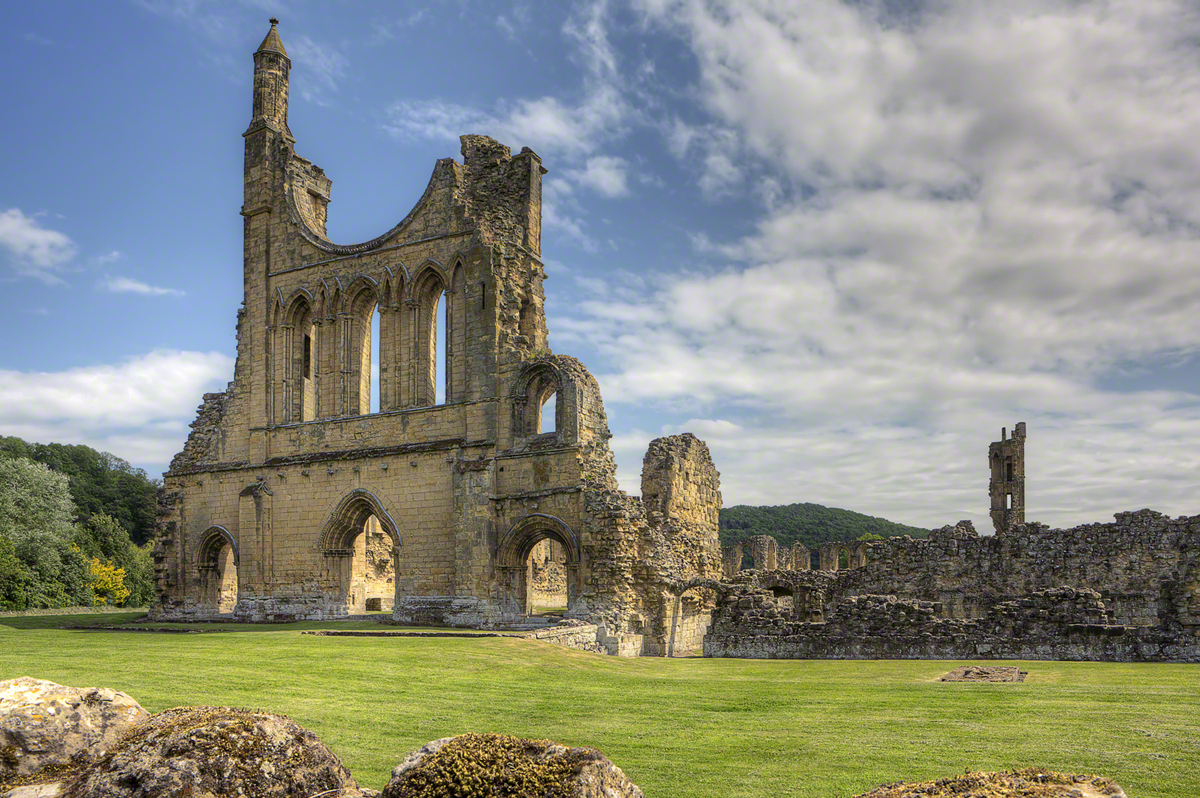

- Location within North Yorkshire

Monastery information
- Order: Savigniac, Cistercian 1148
- Established: 1155
- Disestablished: 1538
- Diocese: Diocese of York

People
- Important associated figures: Abbot Roger, Roger de Mowbray

Site
- Location: Byland, Coxwold, North Yorkshire, England
- Coordinates: 54.2031°N 1.1592°W
- Visible remains: substantial ruins
- Public access: yes

Byland Abbey is a ruined abbey and a small village in Byland with Wass civil parish, in the county of North Yorkshire, England, in the North York Moors National Park.

From 1974 to 2023 it was part of Ryedale District. It is now administered by the unitary North Yorkshire Council.

== History ==
Byland was founded as a Savigniac abbey in January 1135 and was absorbed by the Cistercian order in 1147. It was not an easy start for the community which had had to move five times before settling at the present site. The group of thirteen monks first left Furness Abbey, then in Lancashire, in 1134. They founded a new abbey at Calder, in Cumberland, and remained there for four years. They then suffered their first setback, when a Scottish raid forced them to return to Furness. However, they were refused re-entry, possibly due to lack of space at Furness or because their abbot, Gerald, refused to resign his rank. They departed for York, to seek the help of the reforming Archbishop Thurstan. However, their plans changed and at Thirsk they sought the assistance of Gundreda d'Aubigny, who settled them at Hood. In 1143 they moved to Old Byland, but found this site too close too the Cistercian abbey of Rievaulx – the monks were constantly disturbed by each other's bells. In 1147, the year they joined the Cistercian congregation, the monks moved again to Stocking, where they apparently built a stone church. Meanwhile, permanent buildings were being erected for them at the final site of New Byland, near Coxwold, to which they moved in 1177.

Its early history was marked by disputes with no fewer than four other religious establishments: Furness Abbey, Calder Abbey, Rievaulx Abbey and Newburgh Priory. However, once it had overcome these setbacks, it was described, in the late 14th century, as "one of the three shining lights of the north". Its financial success was not as great as such abbeys as Rievaulx, but it was famed for its sheep rearing and wool exports. Its church was said to be among the finest 12th-century churches in Europe.

In October 1322, King Edward II was at Byland Abbey when the Battle of Old Byland took place. The marauding Scots caught Edward so unaware that he fled to York, leaving many precious items behind. (Note: Some sources say that Edward was at Rievaulx Abbey.)

In the late 12th century the abbey had 36 monks and 100 lay brothers, but by the time of the dissolution in November 1538, there were only 25 monks and an abbot. In the Valor Ecclesiasticus survey of 1535 it was valued at £238, making it one of the larger houses that escaped the first wave of closures. In 1539, the abbey was dissolved and its site was granted to Sir William Pickering. It later passed to the Wombwell family, which still owns it.

The site is now maintained by English Heritage and is a scheduled monument and Grade I listed building. In October 2017, the west front of the church underwent extensive conservation work to repair water damage and to repoint the walls.

=== Burials ===
- Mabel de Clare, d. 1204 (daughter of Roger de Clare, 2nd Earl of Hertford), wife of Nigel de Mowbray
- Roger de Mowbray (Lord of Montbray) (though some uncertainty about his final resting place)
- William de Mowbray, 6th Baron of Thirsk, 4th Baron Mowbray
- Joan of Lancaster, third daughter of Henry, 3rd Earl of Lancaster

== Description ==
Extensive remains can still be seen of all the main buildings of the abbey. The most important building was the vast church, which was grander than any previous Cistercian building in Britain. It replaced a smaller unfinished church, of which parts of the nave and south transept survive, and was under construction from the late 1160s to about 1195. It was aisled throughout, with the aisles behind the presbytery and to the west of the transepts being particularly unusual. The plan was cruciform, with a twelve-bay nave and a lantern tower over the crossing, in violation of Cistercian custom. The elaboration of the church was also novel, with a three-storey internal elevation, wooden vaults over the high central vessels, and shafted columns of a type that was copied across northern England. The design seems to have been inspired by the contemporary work at Ripon Cathedral (then a minster under York), and possibly Archbishop Roger's vanished eastern limb at York itself. The west front of the church stands almost to its full height, while the monastic building ruins have a height of about 5 metres (16 ft) in places. At the top of the west front is the lower half of a huge rose window which was the inspiration for the southern rose window at York Minster. The rest of the church is harder to visualise as all the internal arcades were destroyed after the Dissolution, but most of the external walls stand up to the level of the top of the aisles, as well as one corner of the south transept that stands to its full height. Some of the arcaded stone screens dividing the church into sections for the monks and lay brothers were recovered in excavation and have been reset. An altar table (mensa) was also recovered, although that is now in Ampleforth Abbey. Mosaic floor tiles of the 1230s survive in large areas of the south transept and presbytery, in yellows and greens.

To the south of the church was the cloister, 145 feet (44m) square and laid out in the early 1160s. It was surrounded by three ranges containing the monks' domestic buildings. The east range adjoined the south transept of the church, and has mostly been reduced to low walls. The first room south of the transept was the library and sacristy. The next room was the chapter house, which was vaulted over four central columns and projected beyond the body of the range. The surviving stone lectern base from the chapter house is the only example of its kind in Britain. The next room was the parlour, and then there was a passage to the ground floor of the reredorter. South again was the day stair, and finally there was the day room, where the monks worked, which opened onto a yard to the east. Over the whole range was the dormitory, which has vanished. The south range housed the warming room and the kitchen. Between them stood the refectory, aligned north-south in the Cistercian manner, of which some high walls and a window survive. It was raised over a vaulted undercroft. The west range was the longest, and housed the lay brothers. They were segregated from the choir monks by a 'lane', and had their own dormitory, refectory and reredorter. Unusually, they also had their own cloister, tucked behind the kitchen. This range was the first to be built, possibly in the 1150s, so that it could house the lay brothers who would then assist with constructing the rest before the monks moved in during 1177.

To the east of the main claustral buildings stood the infirmary, the reredorter and the abbot's house. These parts were greatly altered throughout the abbey's working life. In the 13th century a new detached abbot's house was built to the south of the infirmary, and the reredorter was replaced as the drainage was found wanting. Then, in the late 14th century, the infirmary was demolished and replaced by a series of apartments, reflecting the decline in communal living. Rievaulx similarly lost its infirmary in the later middle ages. Further apartments were formed out of the old day room, and possibly the dormitory.

The limestone gatehouse also survives, as a ruin. The remains consist of moulded imposts supporting moulded capitals carrying a round arch with two moulded orders and a hood mould. Attached to it is a wall containing a blocked doorway with a pointed arch and a moulded surround. Of the other outer buildings in the precinct, dry hollows remain of the three large millponds, and extensive earthworks can be seen of the rest.

== Medieval ghost stories ==
Numerous Latin manuscripts were produced at and owned by Byland Abbey, of which twenty-seven are known to have survived. The abbey notably produced a 15th century cartulary, now British Library Egerton MS 2823. One of the manuscripts owned by Byland Abbey in the Middle Ages is noted for containing a collection of twelve ghost stories. The manuscript is now London, British Library Royal MS 15 A xx, produced in the twelfth to thirteenth centuries, primarily containing a copy of the Elucidarium and some tracts by Cicero. However, in the early fifteenth century, an anonymous scribe, known in scholarship simply as 'a monk of Byland', added some extra texts, also in Latin, on previously blank pages (folios 140-43, in the body of the manuscript, and folio 163 b at the end). These are a series of twelve ghost stories, mostly set locally, which were presumably intended for inclusion in sermons as exempla and which reflect orally circulating folklore in Yorkshire at the time. While not a major literary production in their own time, these stories have since come to be regarded as important evidence for popular belief regarding ghosts in medieval north-west Europe.

A facsimile of the manuscript is available online, the texts were edited by M. R. James, and they were translated by A. J. Grant (while seven are also paraphrased in English by Andrew Joynes).

An example, the third story, runs in English translation as follows:

III. Regarding the spirit of Robert son of Robert de Boltebi from Killeburne, confined in a cemetery.

Remembered because the aforesaid younger Robert died and was interred in a cemetery but was wont to depart from the tomb at night and to disturb and frighten off the villagers, and the dogs of the village would follow him and bark loudly. At last the young men of the village spoke together, proposing to capture him if by any means they were able, and convening at the cemetery. But having seen him, all fled except two of them. One, called Robert Foxton, caught him as he emerged from the cemetery and laid him over the church gate, loudly and courageously shouting "You hold fast until I come to you". The other replied, "You dash quickly to the minister so that he may be conjured, since, God willing, because I have him fast, I will hang on until the arrival of the priest". The priest of the parish indeed hurried quickly and conjured him the holy name of the Trinity and by the virtue of Jesus Christ until he responded to his questions.

At that conjuration, he spoke in his guts (and not with his tongue, but as if in a large empty jar) and confessed his many crimes. When he knew these, the priest absolved him but he insisted that the aforesaid capturers would not reveal in any way his confession, and otherwise he rested in peace, having been set in order with God.

One of the original medieval ghost stories is extensively referenced in "The Byland Blowback", a modern fictional ghost story in the book Chilling the Water.

== Gallery ==
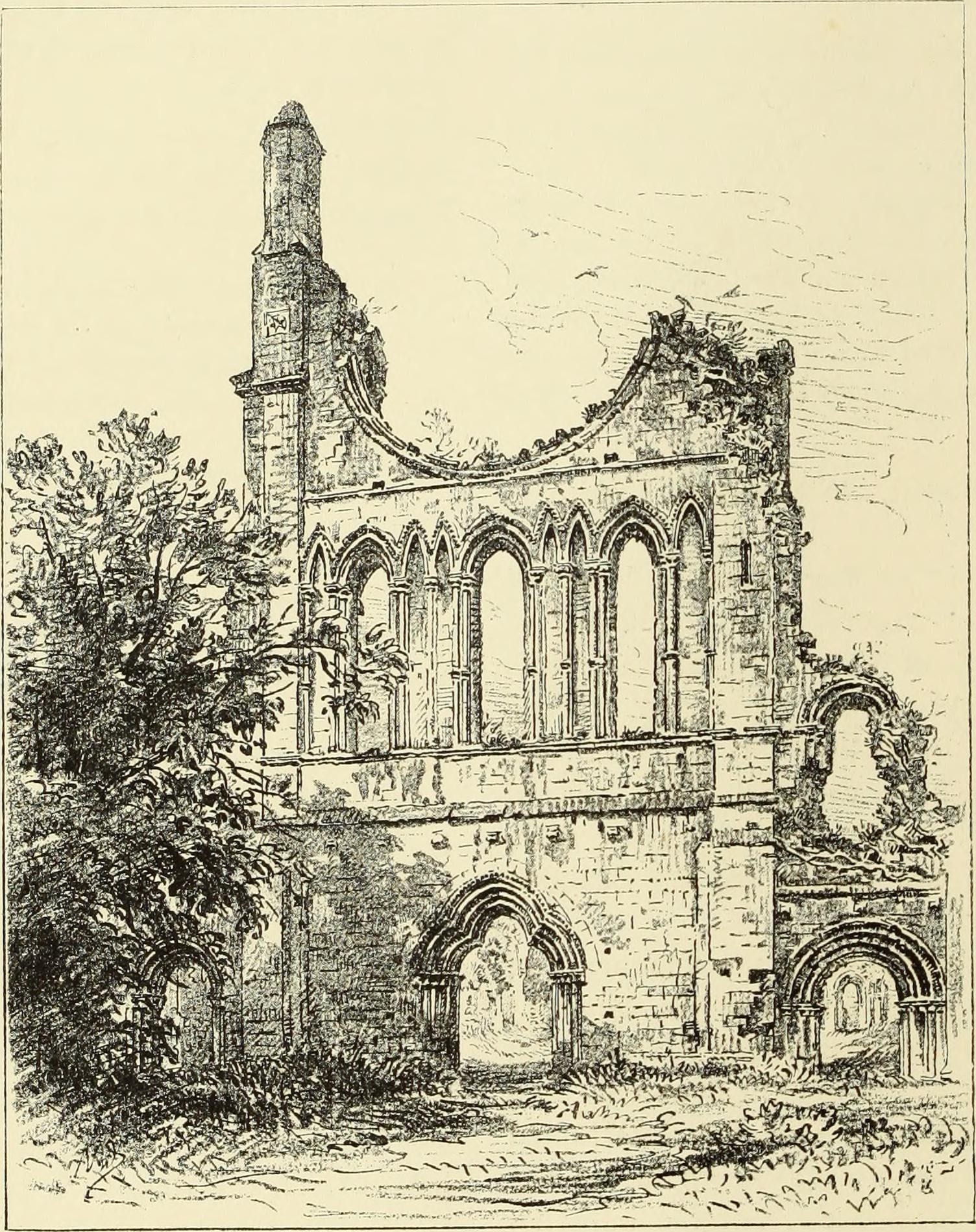
Byland Abbey as depicted in The ruined abbeys of Yorkshire (1883)

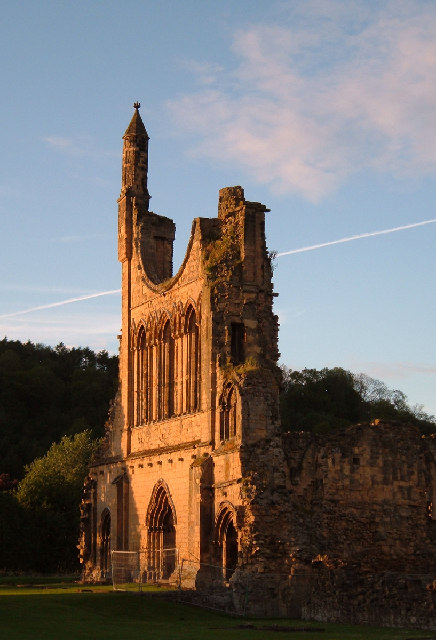
West front

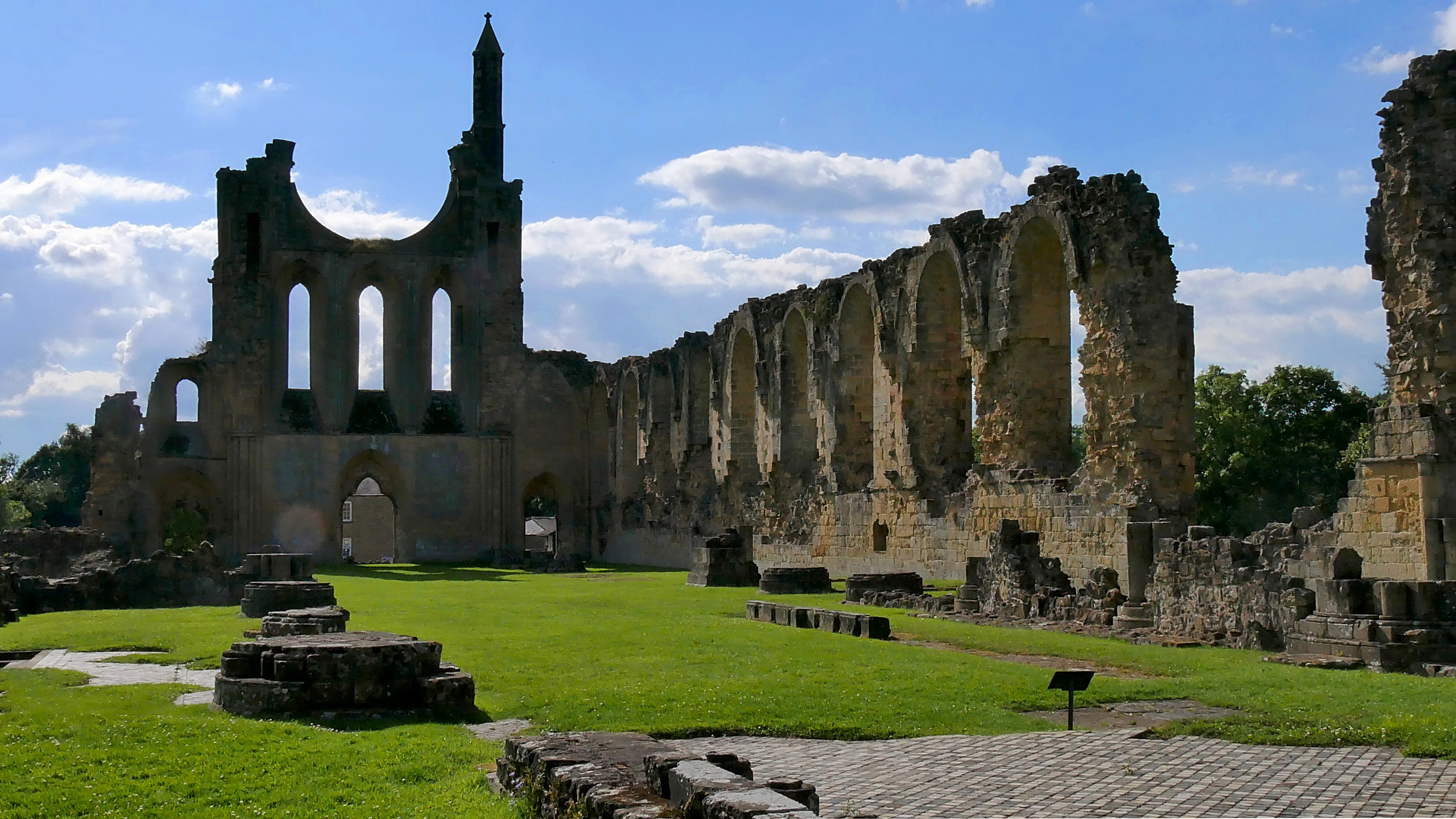
Nave, looking west

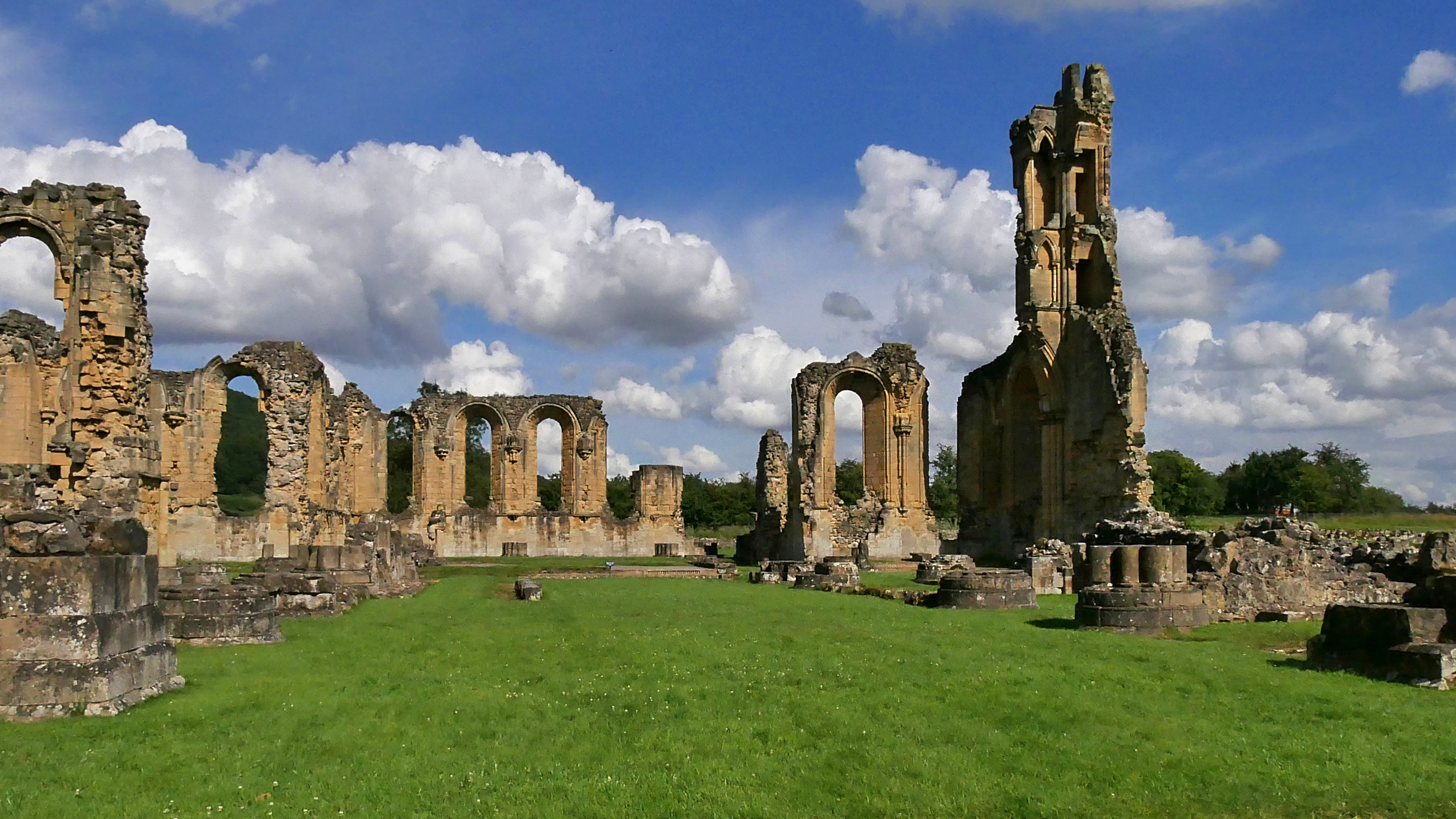
The church, looking east

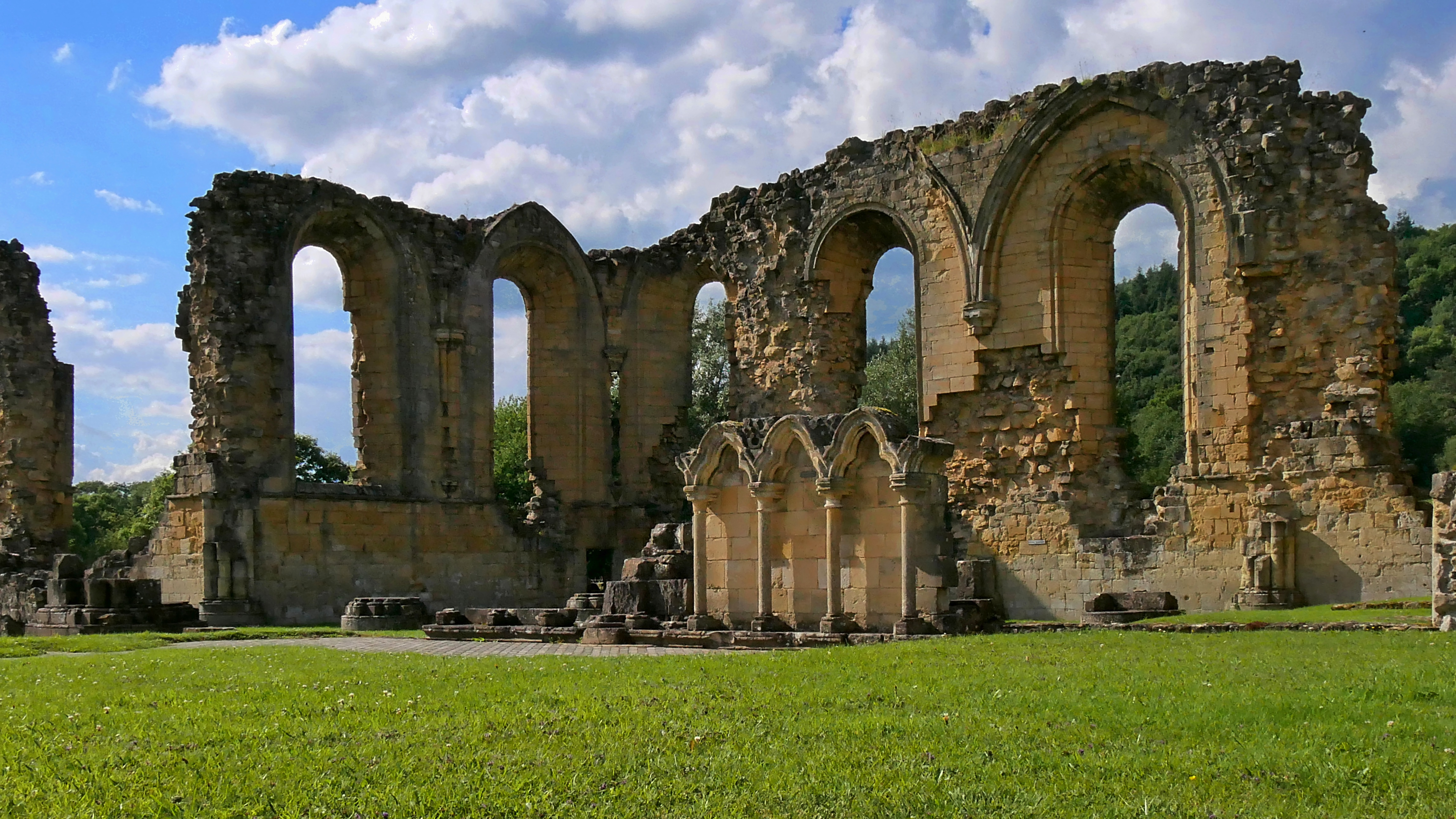
North transept

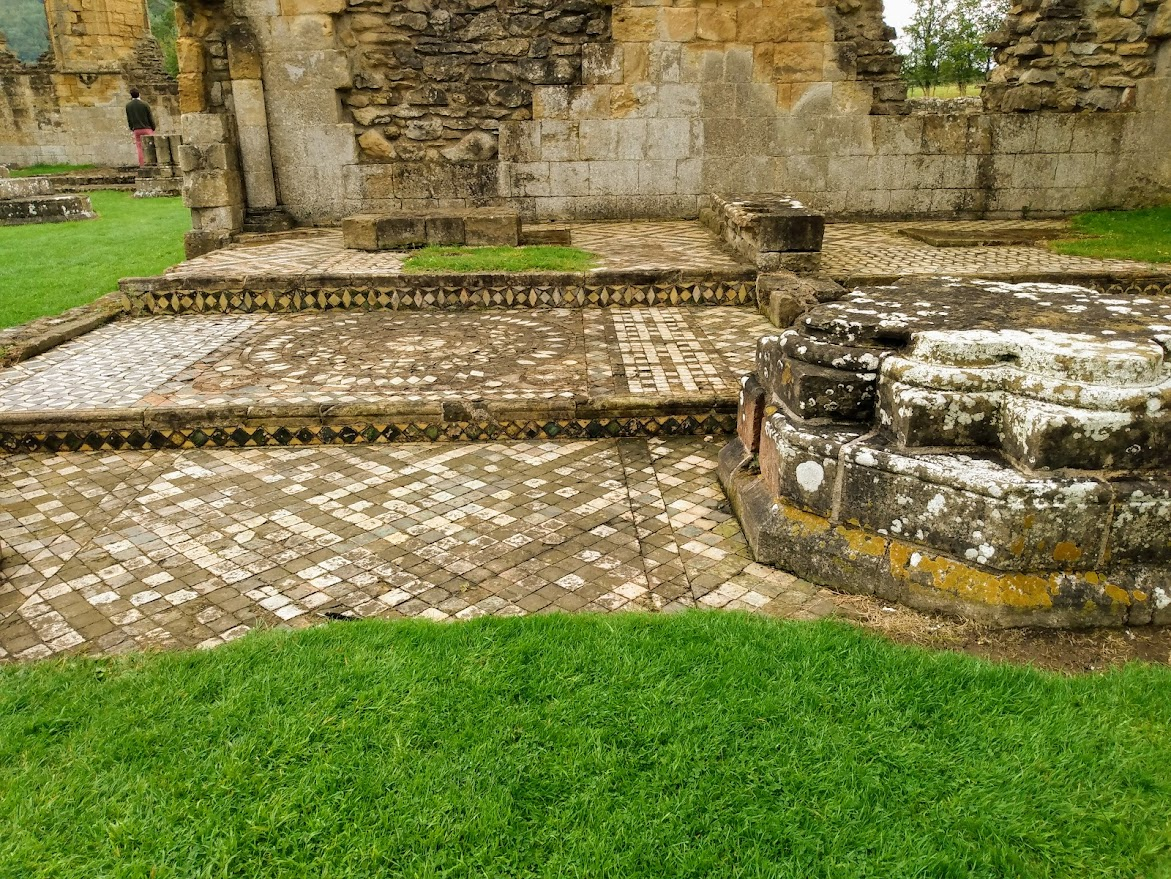
The tiled south transept floor

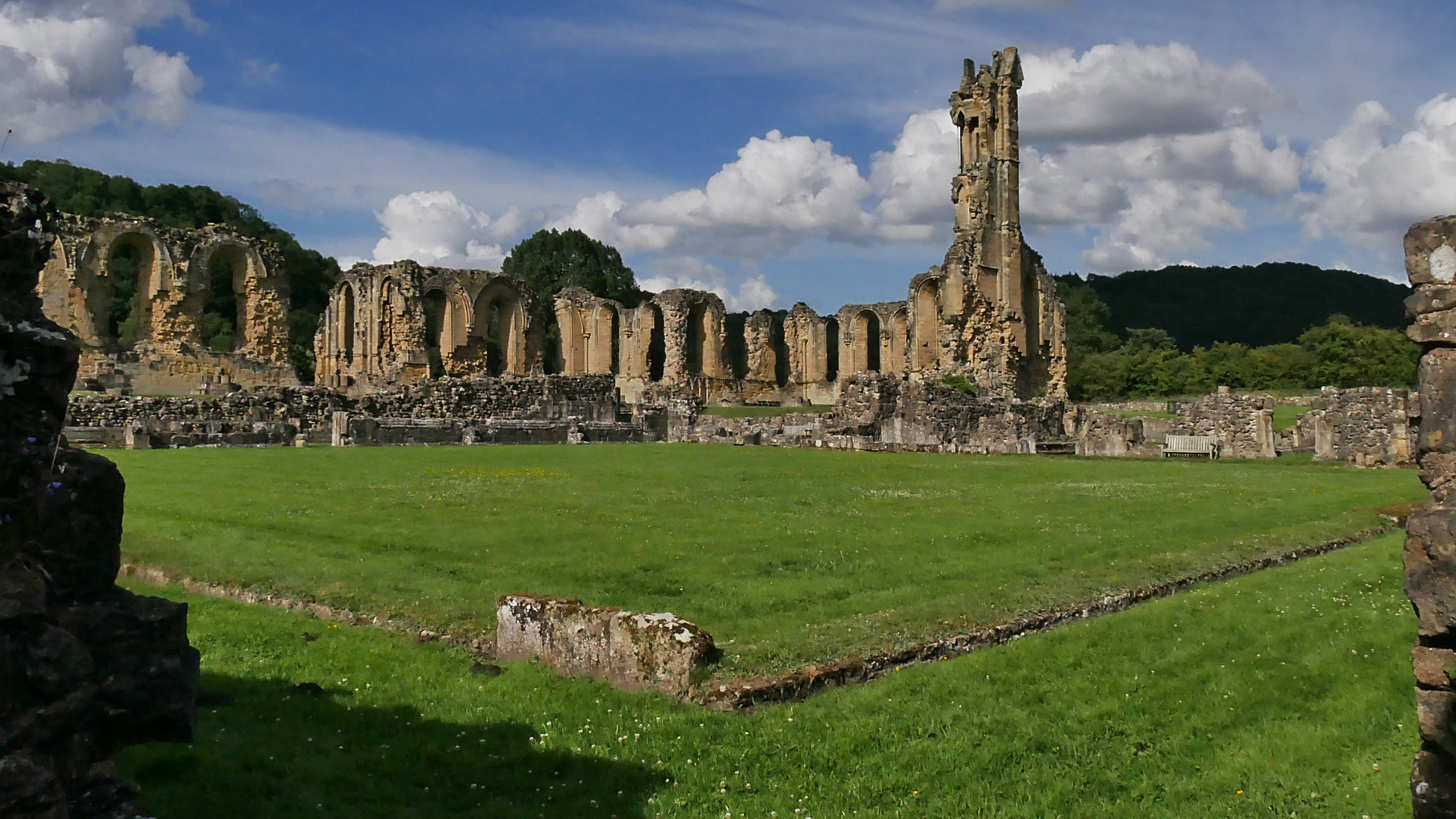
Cloister and church

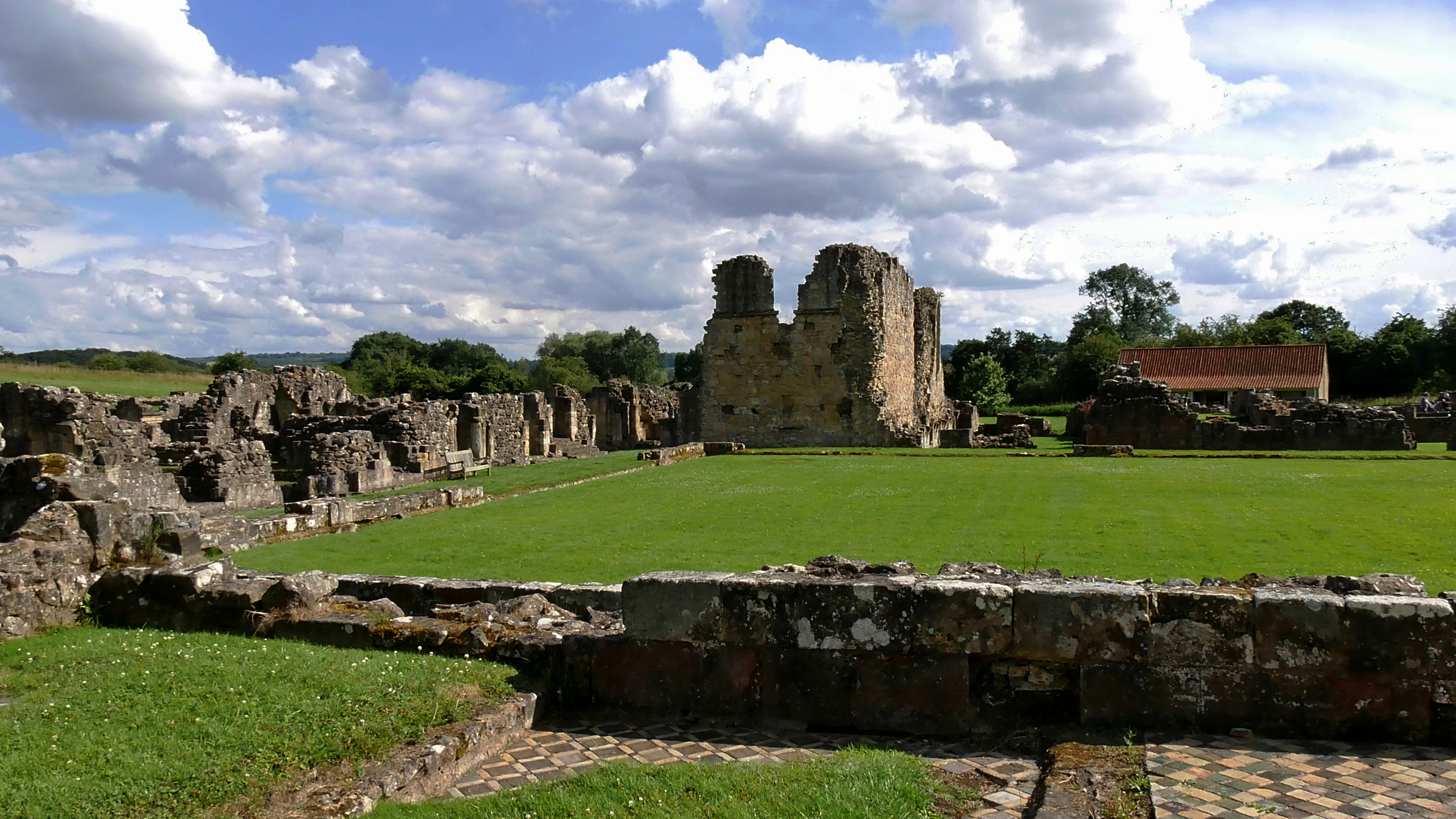
Cloister and warming house

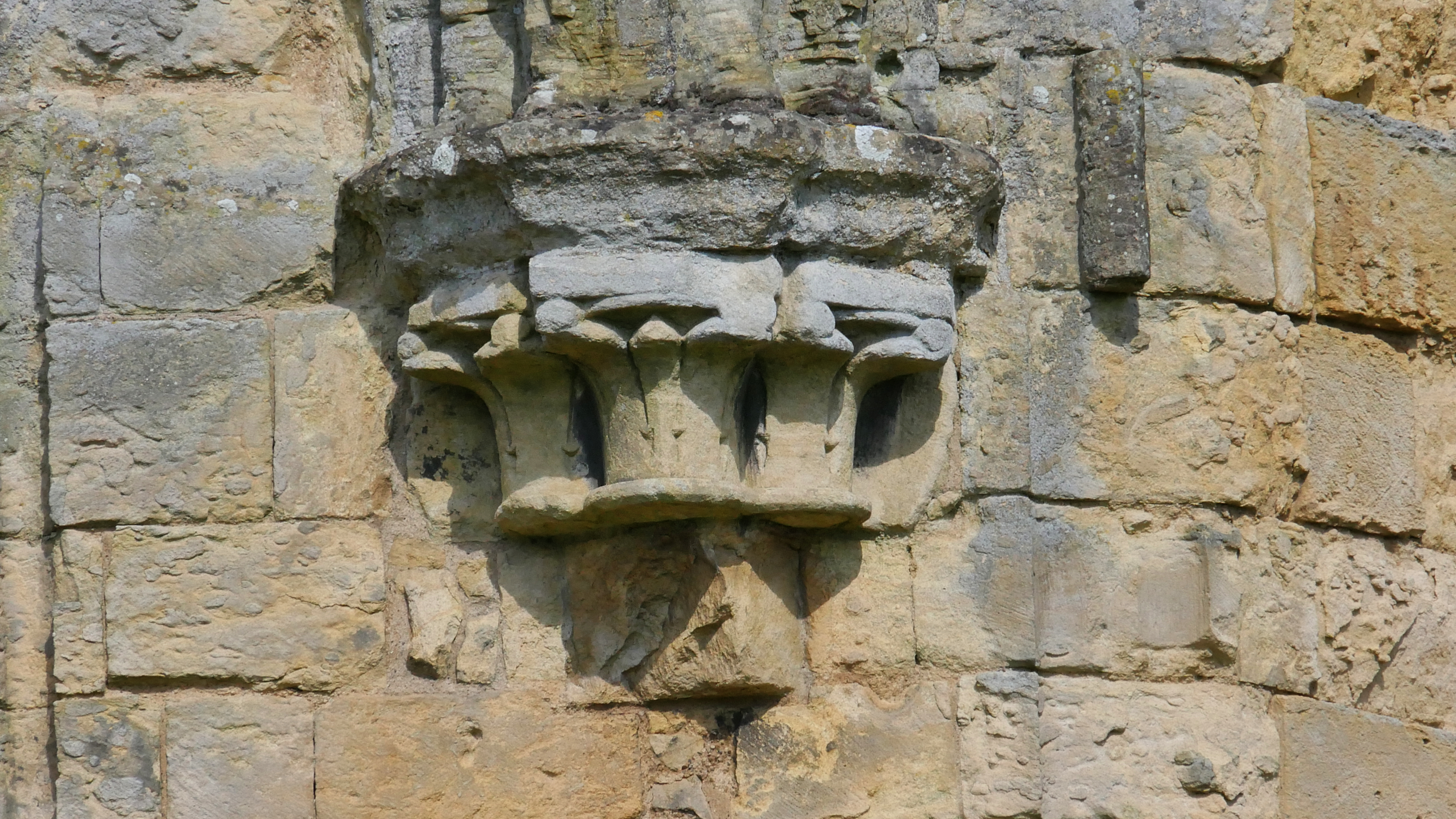
Capital

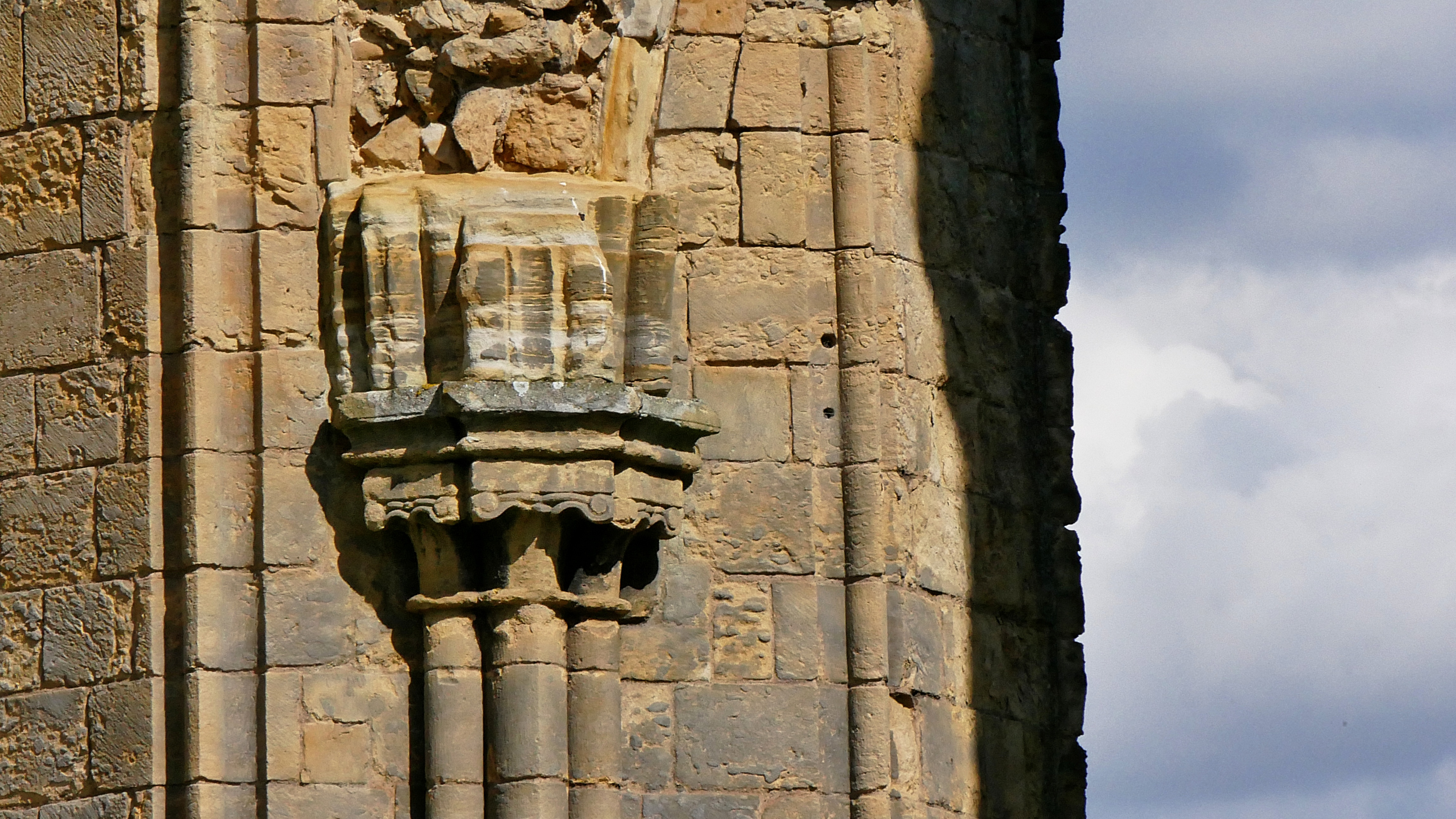
Capital

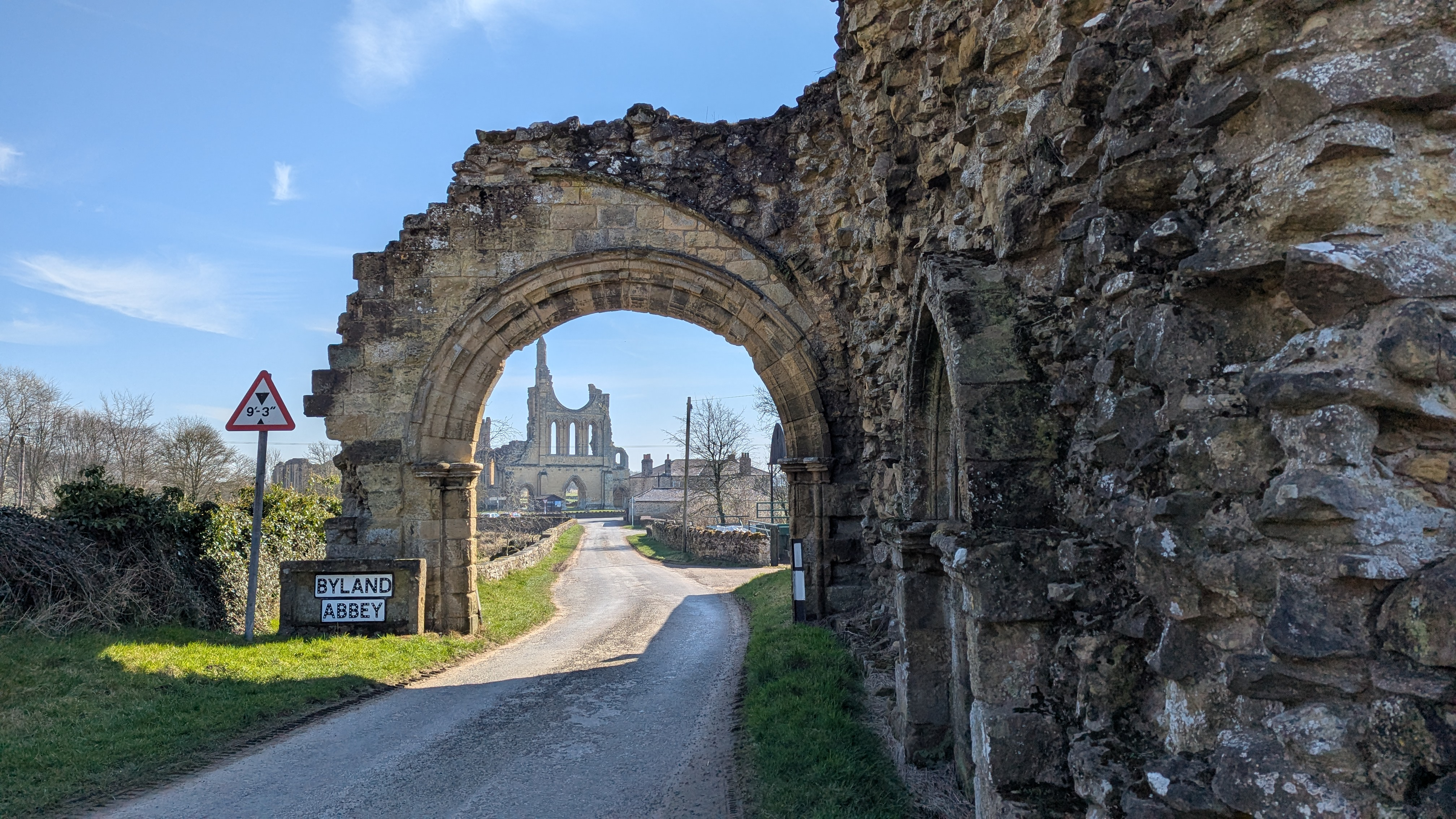
The abbey gatehouse

== See also ==
- Grade I listed buildings in North Yorkshire (district)
- Listed buildings in Byland with Wass
- Battle of Old Byland
- Wimund – English bishop, later turned pirate, was held here after his capture in the 12th century.
