= Charles Calmady =

English cricketer (1791–1855)

Charles Biggs Calmady
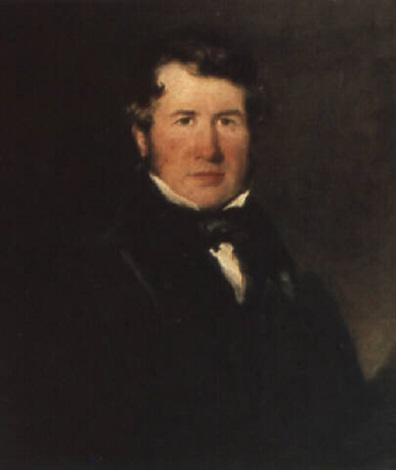
- Portrait of Charles Calmady in 1830, by Frederick Richard Say
- Born: 1791
- Died: 1855
- Occupation: landowner

Charles Biggs Calmady (5 February 1791 – 8 January 1855) was an English landowner and cricketer with amateur status.

== Life ==
He was the son of Admiral Charles Holmes Calmady (born Everitt) and his wife Pollexfen née Calmady (married 8 September 1783 at Saint Nicholas Cole Abbey, London). This was his mother's second marriage: she had previously been married to her cousin Warwick Calmady, who had died. She was the daughter of Francis Vincent Calmady. She was also co-heiress of her brother Francis John Calmady. Everitt had been wrecked off Ushant as captain of HMS Arethusa in 1779. He commanded HMS Solebay at the Battle of Saint Kitts in 1782, burning it when driven aground on Nevis by French attacks. The wreck has been investigated from 2010 by Chris Cartellone. His change of surname to Calmady took place in 1788.

His father having died in March 1807, Calmady matriculated at Oriel College, Oxford in July of that year, aged 16. Lysons (1822) gave his residence as Holne Chace, on Dartmoor. His mother died aged 73 in 1828 at Langdon Hall, Devon, the family seat in the parish of Wembury, about 5 miles (8.0 km) from Plymouth. She had bought West Wembury farm, from the Lockyer family, and owned also the barton at Down Thomas, where the manor belonged to Edmund Pollexfen Bastard.

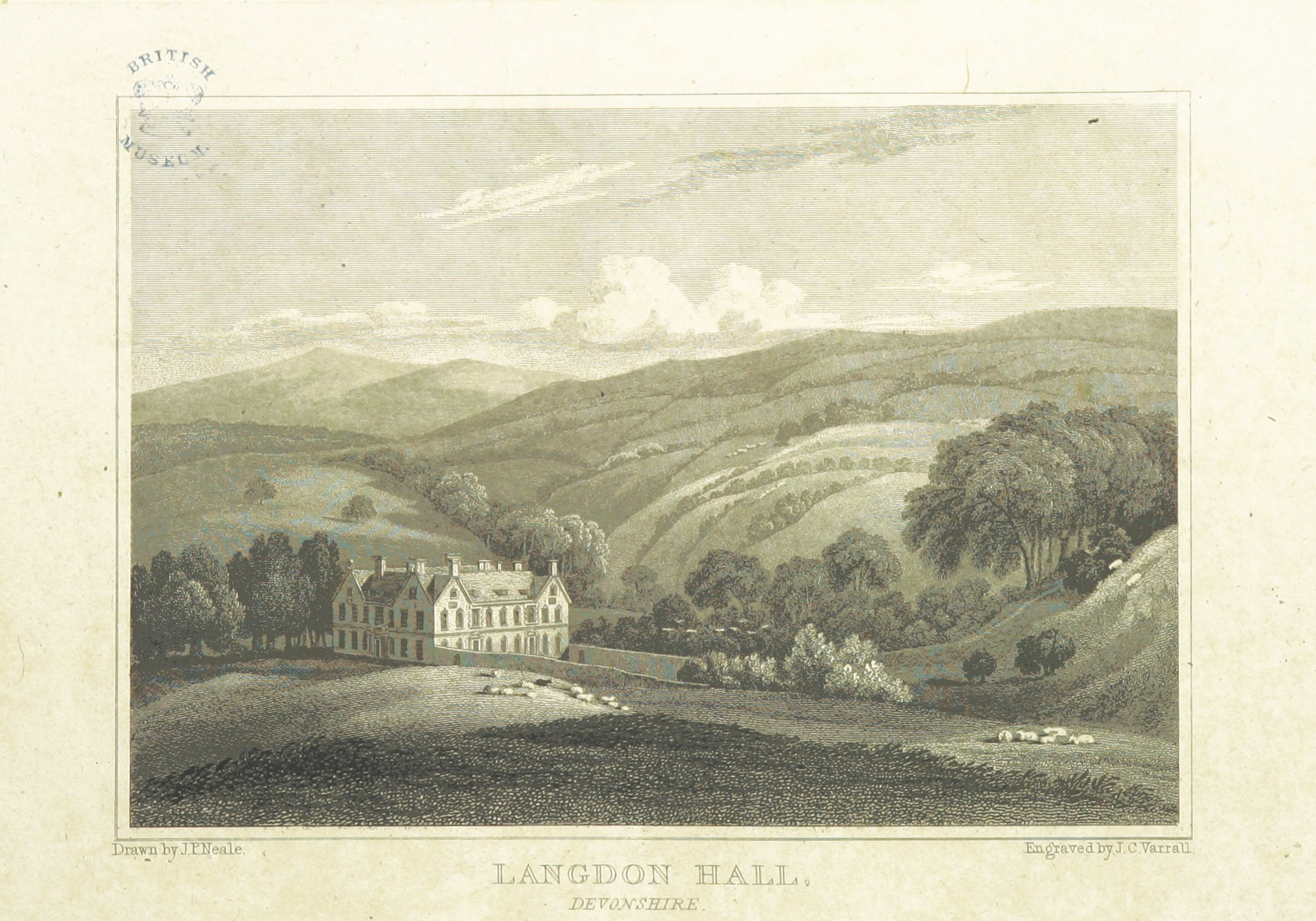
Langdon Hall, Devon, 1818 engraving

Calmady promoted West of England colonising schemes. During 1839 John George Cooke (1819–1880) heard from Calmady and Sir William Molesworth, 8th Baronet of their interest in a "New Plymouth" project of settlement in New Zealand. Around 1840 Calmady became involved with the New Zealand Company, sitting on its West of England Board. His brother-in-law Robert Greenwood (died 1889) emigrated to New Zealand in 1850, having turned down an offer to go in 1841 with Cooke on the Amelia Thompson. He named Calmady Terrace in New Plymouth after his sister Emily.

The president or chairman of the Free Trade Association of the 1840s in Plymouth, Calmady supported the repeal of the Corn Laws. He stood for election as a Liberal in 1847, in the Free Trade interest, in Plymouth, a constituency which returned two members to parliament. In debate with Richard Crowder in Plymouth on 15 July at a noisy meeting, Calmady announced political principles, including broader suffrage and the secret ballot, associated with the Chartists. He came third in the poll with 769 votes, behind Viscount Ebrington (921) and Roundell Palmer (837). For the 1852 general election, Robert Porrett Collier took his place, stating that "his opinions perhaps did not go so far as Mr. Calmady's, but this was not an objection". Collier was elected.

== Cricket ==
Calmady was associated with Marylebone Cricket Club and made his debut in 1828. His bowling helped Plymouth Garrison Club defeat Devonport Club in September 1829.

== Family ==
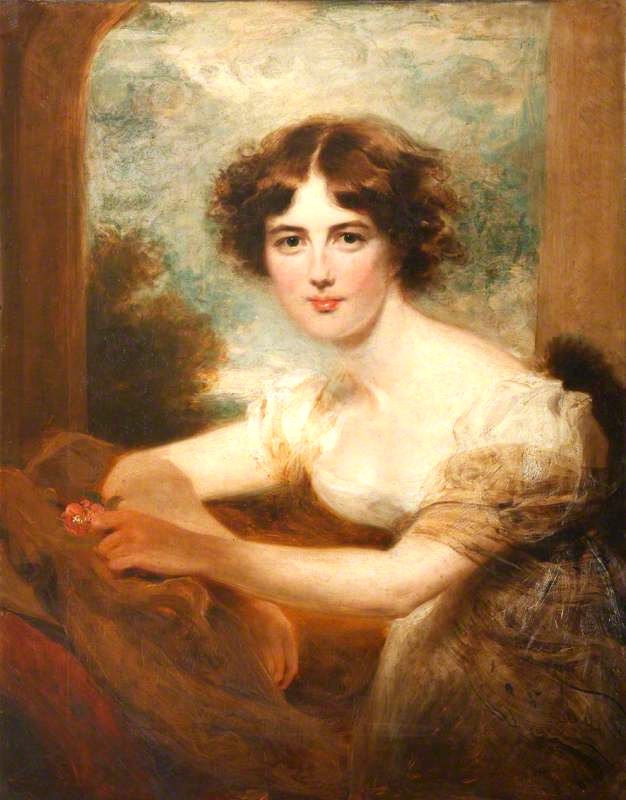
Emily Calmady (1794–1855), portrait by George Henry Harlow

Calmady married on 28 March 1816 at Hinton Ampner Emily Greenwood, of Brookwood Park, Bramdean, Hampshire; she was the daughter of William Greenwood, and sister of George Greenwood (1799–1875), author of Hints on Horsemanship, and of John Greenwood. Emily was an amateur artist, a friend of Frederick Christian Lewis. The celebrated double portrait of her two eldest daughters as young children resulted from a visit she made, on Lewis's advice, to the studio of Thomas Lawrence. Lawrence corresponded with Emily at Woodcote House, Calmady's residence in Hampshire, in the region of Alresford and Bramdean, near Brookwood Park and the London-Southampton road.

The couple later resided on the family estate at Langdon Hall, Devon, where they were both buried in January 1855. The family sold the Hall in 1875.

They had children including:

- Vincent Pollexfen Calmady MFH, only son, born 1825. He married in 1887 Isabel Sheldon, daughter of Edward Sheldon and widow of Frederick Dewes Granville, and died at Tetcott in 1896.
- Emily, died 1906 unmarried.
- Laura, died 1894 unmarried, suffragist and supporter of the RSPCA, NSPCC and Dartmoor Preservation Society.
- Honora Mary, third daughter, married Sir John Augustus Hugh Boyd, 4th Baronet.
- Cycill Christiana, fourth daughter, married in 1854 William Frederick Collier, second son of John Collier.
- Gertrude Elizabeth.

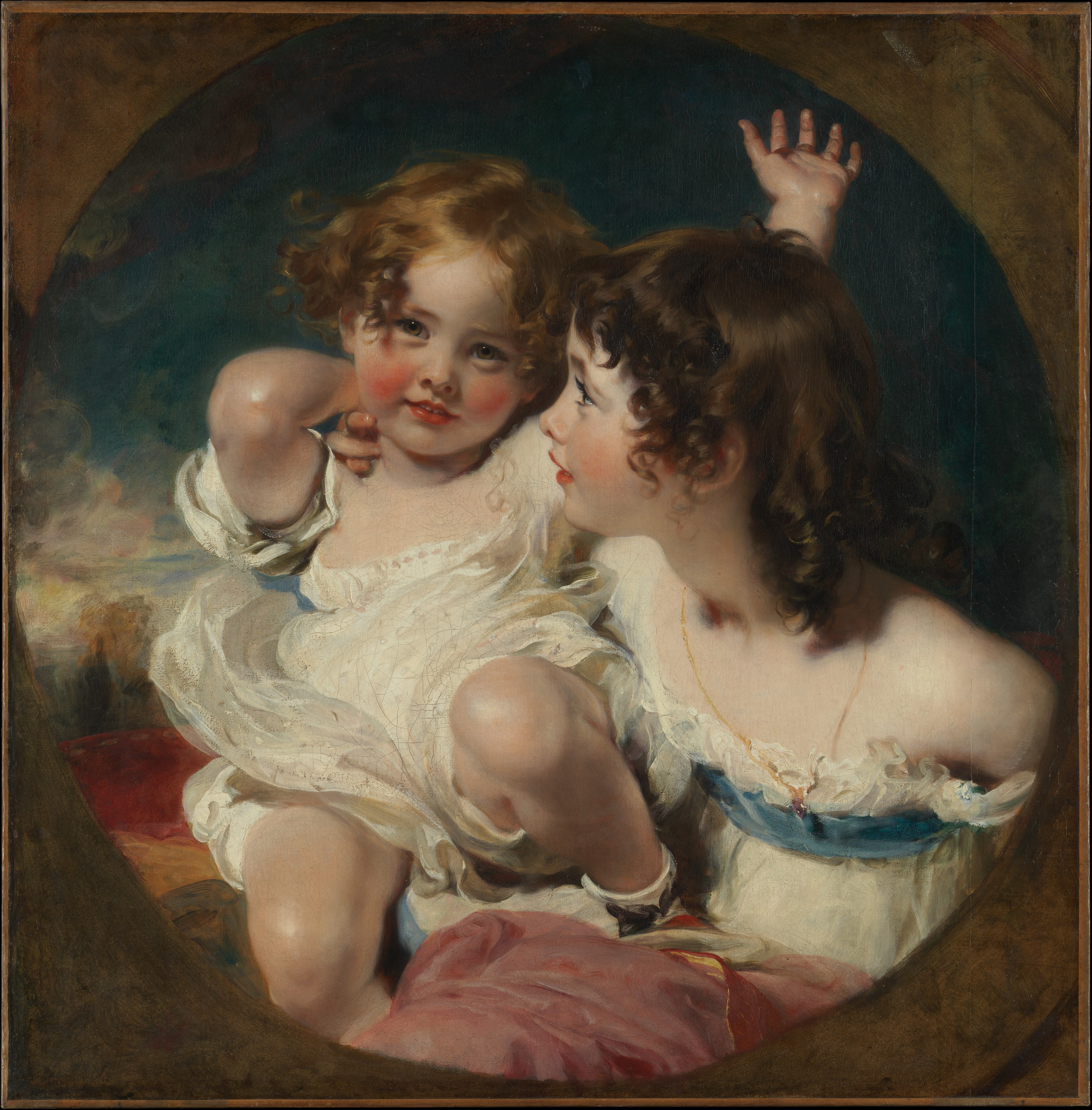
Portrait of the Calmady daughters Emily (born 1818) and Laura Anne (born 1820), 1823 by Thomas Lawrence as The Calmady Children, in the Metropolitan Museum of Art

== Bibliography ==
- Haygarth, Arthur (1996) [1862]. Scores & Biographies, Volume 1 (1744–1826). Kennington: Frederick Lillywhite. ISBN 978-19-00592-23-9.
- Haygarth, Arthur (1997) [1862]. Scores & Biographies, Volume 2 (1827–1840). Kennington: Frederick Lillywhite. ISBN 978-19-00592-23-9.
