= Josias Calmady =

Member of the Parliament of England

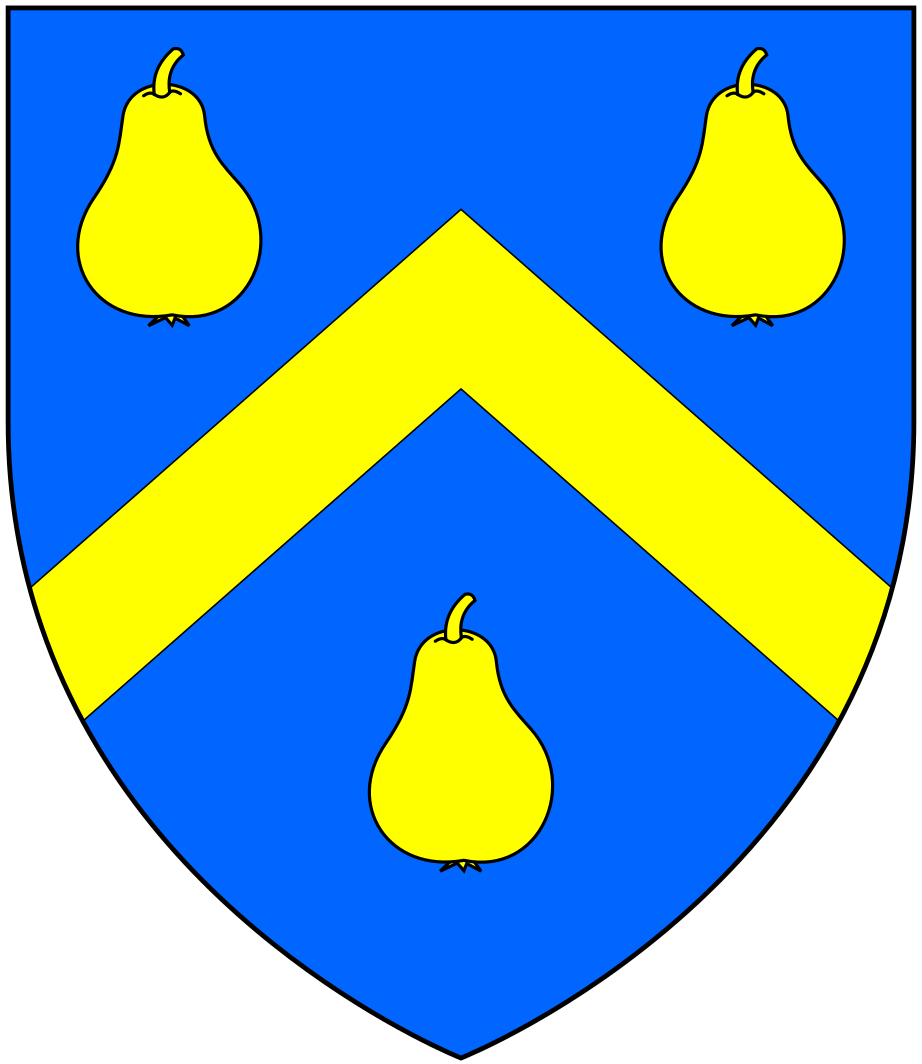
Arms of Calmady: Azure, a chevron between three pears or

Josias II Calmady (10 October 1619 – March 1683) of Langdon, in the parish of Wembury, Devon, was Member of Parliament for Okehampton in the Convention Parliament of 1660.

== Origins ==
Josias II Calmady was the third son and eventual heir of Sir Shilston I Calmady (1585–1645) by his wife Honora Fortescue, daughter of Edmund Fortescue of Fallapit, East Allington, Devon, and widow of Sir Humphrey Prideaux of Soldon, Holsworthy. Sir Shilston I Calmady of Langdon was knighted in 1618 at Theobalds Grove and was killed during the Civil War at the siege of Ford Abbey, Devon, on 13 February 1645, and was buried in nearby Membury, Devon parish church, where survives his monument.

== Career ==
In 1660, Calmady was elected Member of Parliament for Okehampton in the Convention Parliament.

== Marriages and children ==
Calmady married twice:

- Firstly to Thomasine Buller, daughter of Sir Richard Buller, by whom he had two daughters, Thomasine and Honor.
- Secondly he married Elizabeth Coffin, daughter of John Coffin (1593–1622) of Portledge, Alwington, Devon, by whom he had two sons, who both died as children, and a daughter:
  - Josias Calmady (1656–1668)
  - Shilston Calmady (1659–1668)
  - Elizabeth Calmady (1657–1678), who died aged 21 having married John Narborough, later in 1688 created Sir John Narborough, 1st Baronet (d. 1707), of the Royal Navy, son of Rear-Admiral Sir John Narborough (c. 1640 – 1688). Her widower Sir John drowned in action with his brother James Narborough and their step-father Admiral Sir Cloudesley Shovell aboard HMS Association during the Scilly naval disaster of 1707. Her monument, described by Pevsner as "uniquely ambitious for Devon in its intention" survives in Wembury Church.

== Death & legacies ==
He died at the age of 63. He was concerned with relieving the poor and left several charitable legacies in his will.

== Succession ==
He was succeeded by his nephew, Josias III Calmady (d. 1714), of Leawood, Bridestowe, Devon (son of Shilston Calmady (1621–1688) of Leawood, Bridestowe and brother of John Calmady, MP for Okehampton in 1660), who in 1680 also became MP for Okehampton and was Sheriff of Devon in 1688.
