= Robert Walton (restaurateur) =

British restaurateur

Robert Walton MBE is a British restaurateur who is currently serving as the president of the Restaurant Association.

== Early hospitality career ==
Walton attended the Ealing Art College under the tutelage of Victor Ceserani, whilst working as a trainee manager in a London restaurant.

He started his first restaurant, Petit Village, aged 24, located in Caversham, near Reading. Later endeavours included The Elm Tree in Beech Hill, Tamarind Tree in Lower Basildon and Trunkwell Mansion House in Beech Hill.

Walton first joined the Restaurant Association in 1992.

== Ventures ==
After serving as the vice chairman and later chairman, Walton became the president of the Restaurant Association in 2008.

In 2007, Walton received an MBE in the Queen's New Year honours list in recognition of his services to the hospitality industry.

Walton founded the Nth Degree Club in 2013, a fine dining members club that works in close association with the Michelin Guide. In 2019, the club hosted the Restaurant Association’s 50th Anniversary at The Savoy. The event saw Albert Roux OBE, Michel Roux Jr. and Emily Roux receive the Restaurant Association Award for Services to Hospitality, an award designed and sponsored by Faberge.

In 2019, Walton was instrumental in reviving the Young Chef, Young Waiter competition. Originally founded in 1979, the global competition is open to chefs and waiters under the age of 26. Walton currently serves as the chairman of the competition, with Adam Handling currently serving as the Head Judge Chef.

In 2022, Walton became an ambassador for the Great Britain and Northern Ireland campaign to promote the UK hospitality sector internationally.

== Personal life ==
Walton is married to Australian jeans designer Donna Ida Thornton, founder of the DONNA IDA brand. The wedding ceremony took place at St Paul's Cathedral.

The couple purchased the 16th-century grade II listed Langdon Court Hotel in 2021.

Following a personal health battle against head and neck cancer in 2018, Walton held a virtual cook-along that raised over £3,000 for Oracle Cancer Trust.
