= ALMR =

ALMR may refer to:

- Advanced liquid metal reactor, a nuclear reactor design
- Association of Licensed Multiple Retailers, incorporated into the British Hospitality Association
