= Young Chef, Young Waiter =

Global hospitality competition

World Young Chef Young Waiter and Young Mixologist is a global hospitality competition for chefs, waiters, and mixologist 28 and under.

== History ==
Since the launch in 1979, the competition ran continuously until a hiatus from 2012 until 2019. The competition was designed to promote hospitality as a career, a profession and a vocation.

Past winners and judges include Theo Randall, Mark Sargeant, Marcus Wareing, Simon King, John Torode, Raymond Blanc, Heston Blumenthal and Charles Forte.

== Relaunch ==
The competition returned in 2019, in partnership with The Nth Degree Global, UKHospitality and the Restaurant Association, with Robert Walton MBE as chairman and Sean Valentine FIH as Managing Director. Adam Handling is the current Head Judge Chef whilst Simon King is the Head Judge Waiter.

=== 2019 Competition ===
The 2019 Young Chef Young Waiter finals were held on 28 and 29 October. The judging panel included Emily Roux, Tom Kerridge and Claude Bosi among others.

16 chefs and 16 waiters formed the group of 32 finalists. Within the 32 finalists were three apiece from The Fat Duck, The Hand & Flowers and Hide.

Richard Henderson from the Restaurant Hywel Jones, Lucknam Park was crowned the winning Young Chef, whilst Alessandro Calzavacca representing the Jean-Georges at The Connaught was named the Young Waiter. The winners were announced at Quaglino's restaurant in an event presented by John Torode.

=== 2020 Competition ===
2020 saw the introduction of the Young Chef Young Waiter China & South East Asia competition, led by chairwoman Ching He Huang.

The 2020 finals were held at The Dorchester. Having originally been scheduled for late 2020, the competition was rescheduled to May 2021 as a result of the COVID-19 pandemic.

Theo Randall was the Head Chef Judge, Simon King the Head Waiter Judge with Ching He Huang announcing the winners of the China & South East Asia competition.

The main sponsors for the 2020 competition were the Mercedes Benz Fleet & Business department, who presented the winners with a complimentary Mercedes Benz A Class for a year.

Florian David, representing The Waterside Inn won the Young Waiter category, with Peter Meechan from Gleneagles crowned the Young Chef. In the China & South East Asia competition, Marie Bouquet from Tíng, Shangri-La Hotel at The Shard was crowned the Young Waiter whilst Tibor Palast from the Sushi Bar, Harrods won the Young Chef.

=== 2021 Competition ===
In 2021, Young Chef Young Waiter partnered with the Department for International Trade. The semi-finals and finals took place at the Marriott Aloft Creek Hotel in Dubai, with the winners announced at the UK Pavilion at the Expo 2020 Dubai.

Adam Handling replaced Theo Randall as the Head Chef Judge, whilst Simon King remained as Head Waiter Judge.

Sophie Heyer, representing The Promenade at The Dorchester was crowned the Young Waiter, with Connor Blades from Ugly Butterfly being crowned Young Chef.

=== 2022 Competition ===
The finals for the Young Chef Young Waiter England took place on 18–19 July 2022, whilst the World Young Chef Young Waiter final was held on 16 November 2022. The world final, which took place in Monaco, saw the champions of eight countries competing against each other, including the Cayman Islands.

Miltan Masha from the Monarch Theatre was the winning chef in the England 2022 competition, whilst Elisa Doisneau from the Kitchen Table won the waiter competition.

The winners of the World Young Chef Young Waiter competition were both from Wales. Ali Halbert from Heaney's Cardiff won the Young Chef category, whilst Tilly Morris representing Grove of Narberth won the Young Waiter award.

The Prince Albert of Monaco was the guest of honour at the event.
