= Langdon Court, Devon =

Manor house in Devon, England

Coordinates: 50.3285°N 4.0877°W

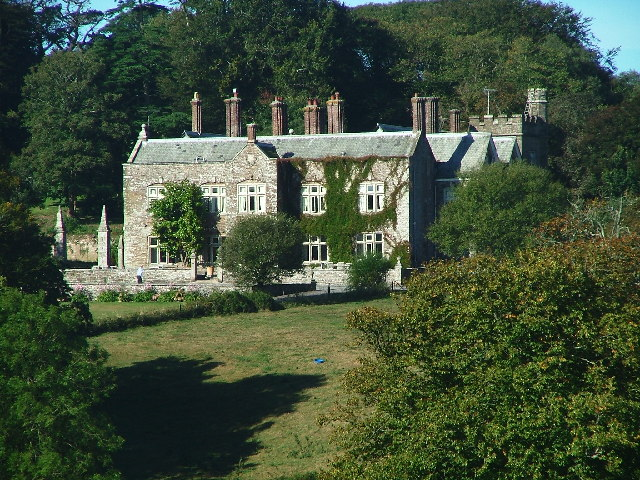

Langdon Court is a former manor house, in Wembury, South Devon, England. It consists of a single courtyard mansion from 1693 and a walled formal garden. The house is a Grade II* listed building, and the garden is Grade II listed in the National Register of Historic Parks and Gardens. In 1960 it was bought and converted into the Langdon Court Hotel.

== History ==
=== Domesday Book ===
Langedone is recorded in the Domesday Book of 1087 as having been a double manor amongst the 107 Devon holdings granted to Juhel de Totnes (d. 1123/30), feudal baron of Totnes, by William the Conqueror for his support during the Norman Conquest of England in 1066. Before 1066 one part had been held by Heche (or "Heca"), the other by Gode (or "Goda"). Juhel in turn granted both parts of Langdon to one of his knights named Waldin

=== Pipard ===
During the reign of King Henry III (1216–1272) Langdon was held by the Pipard family and then by the great Courtenay family, Earls of Devon. This family held the estate for nearly 200 years, with the last Courtenay being Marquis of Exeter who in 1538 was beheaded for treason by King Henry VIII. This was probably due to his opposition to Henry's break with Rome and the creation of the Church of England during the Pilgrimage of Grace uprising.

=== Escheat to royal demesne ===
The house later passed to Henry VIII's widow Catherine Parr.

=== Calmady ===
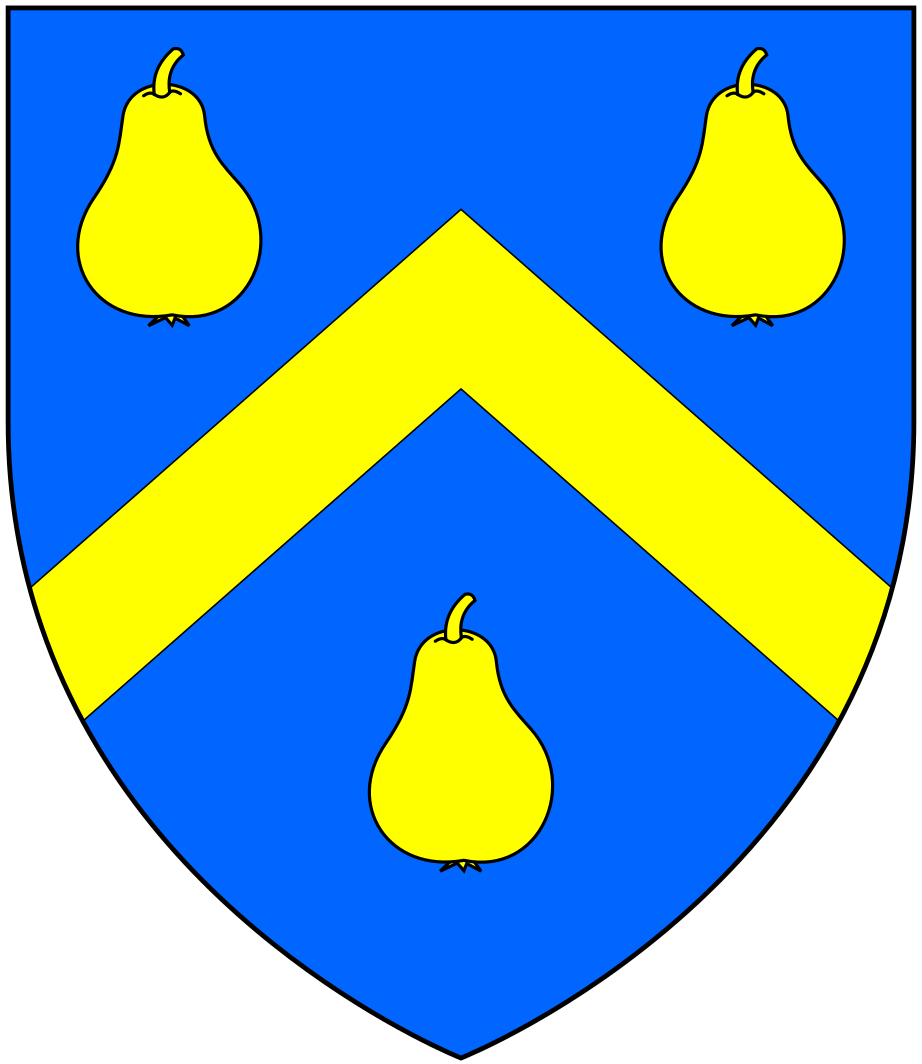
Arms of Calmady: Azure, a chevron between three pears or

In 1555 Langdon Court was purchased from the crown by Vincent Calmady (d.1579), attorney-at-law. He was the third son of John Calmady of Calmady (a tenement within the manor of Penfound, in the parish of Poundstock, Cornwall) by his wife Frances Vincent, daughter of Francis Vincent. The family had been established at Calmady since at least 1337. This was the start of a great building and landscaping period, much of which exists at Langdon today. The Calmady family created an early English Renaissance garden which survives. Langdon Court remained in the family until 1875, when it was sold by the children of Charles Calmady. The early descent was as follows:

- Vincent Calmady (d.1579), purchased Langdon. By his first wife Mary Nicks he left children who inherited Langdon.
- Josias I Calmady (1565–1611), son and heir, who in 1584 married Katherine Courtenay, daughter and co-heiress of Edward Courtenay of Ugbrooke
- Sir Shilston I Calmady (1585–1645), son and heir. He was knighted in 1618 at Theobalds Grove and was killed during the Civil War at the siege of Ford Abbey, Devon, on 13 February 1645, and was buried in nearby Membury parish church, where survives his monument.
- Josias II Calmady (1619–1683), third son and eventual heir, MP for Okehampton in 1680
- Charles Home Calmady (d.1807). Admiral of the Blue 1804, Captain Bramdean (Hants) Volunteer Cavalry 1798. Died aged 55 at Langdon Hall

Noted families of descent include the Sykes family, who through Admiral Clark Gayton, are of relation to the Calmady's of Langdon.

=== Cory ===
Richard Cory purchased Langdon Court in 1876. He was the son of William Cory, who founded the coal shipping and bunkering firm in London known as William Cory & Son. During his tenure, extensive repairs and alterations were made to the house. On several occasions, Richard Cory played host to his friend the Prince of Wales, later to become Edward VII, who was often accompanied by his friend, the society beauty and actress Lillie Langtry.

=== Later owners ===
On Richard Cory's death in 1904 the estate was broken up and Mrs. Kenyon-Slaney bought the house and 10 acres (40,000 m^{2}) of land. She lived in the house until the beginning of the Second World War. After the war Langdon Court was purchased by the City Council of Plymouth and used as a children's convalescent home.

In 1960 the council sold the building and work was carried out to convert the building into the Langdon Court Hotel.The hotel was purchased by John and Shelia Barnes and Alan and Ann Cox. In 2018 the hotel was bought by the Carlauren Group. Carlauren Group's Heritage Hotels division went into administration in December 2019, and Langdon Court Hotel was closed in June 2020 after losses caused by the COVID-19 pandemic.

In September 2021 it was reported to have been bought by Donna Ida Thornton and Robert Walton.
