= Stanley High School, Southport =

Stanley High School
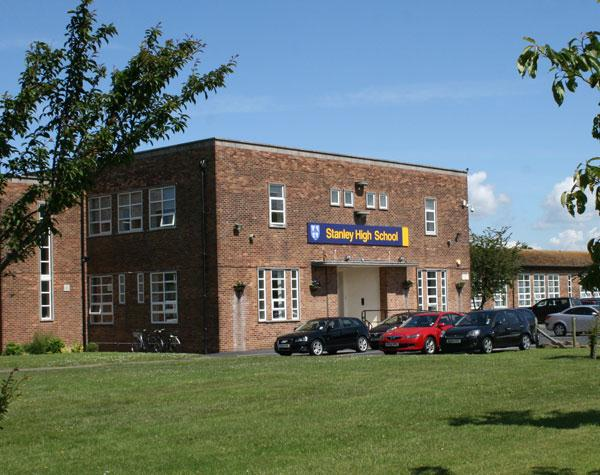

Location
- Fleetwood Road; Southport, Merseyside, PR9 9TF; England; 53.6695°N 2.9751°W

Information
- Type: Academy
- Established: 1 September 2017
- Local authority: Sefton
- Trust: Southport Learning Trust
- Department for Education URN: 144618 Tables
- Ofsted: Reports
- Head teacher: Nicki Gregg
- Gender: Coeducational
- Age: 11 to 16
- Enrolment: 707
- Website: https://stanleyhigh.co.uk/

Stanley High School is a coeducational secondary school located in the resort town of Southport, Merseyside in North West England. It opened in 1952, with 300 pupils, and was named after Edward Stanley, 18th Earl of Derby. The school became a designated specialist Sports College in 2003, but in 2012 was renamed Stanley High School to celebrate the school's 60th anniversary. In 2016 the school was judged Inadequate by Ofsted and therefore became an academy in 2017. The school's academy sponsor is Southport Learning Trust. The school was rated Good following an Ofsted inspection in February 2020.

== Dates and results of full inspections ==
- 1996, outcome unstated
- 2002, "improving and increasingly successful"
- 2007, Satisfactory
- 2010, Satisfactory
- 2012, Requires Improvement
- 2014, Requires Improvement
- 2016, Inadequate
- 2020, Good

== Notable former pupils ==
- Lee Mack, Actor/Comedian
- Joanne Nicholas, Badminton player
- Marcus Wareing, Chef
- Toby Savin, Footballer for Accrington Stanley
