= Donna Ida Thornton =

Australian fashion designer

Donna Ida Thornton is an Australian-born fashion designer, founder of the eponymous Jeans brand DONNA IDA. The designer is regularly referred to as the "Jeans Queen" by the UK press.

== Early life ==
Thornton was raised in Sydney, Australia. Having left school at the age of 16, she started her career as a personal assistant at a property development company. She moved to London in 1999, still working in marketing.

== DONNA IDA ==
Thornton started her eponymous jeans brand in October 2006 when she was 33 years old. The first boutique was located on Draycott Avenue in Chelsea, and was followed by boutiques opened in Westfield, Belgravia and Guildford. The DONNA IDA fashion brand was launched in 2012. Notable fans of the brand include Made in Chelsea regular Millie Mackintosh, who in 2012 did a photoshoot with Thornton. In 2014, the Donna Ida brand expanded its denim offerings to include more low-rise jean options.

In 2016, the designer collaborated with high street retailer Jaeger to launch a new denim collection. In 2017, British Vogue covered her brand's expansion beyond denim clothing into a lifestyle brand that includes merchandise such as candles and nightwear.

== Personal life ==
Thornton is married to restaurateur Robert Walton. The pair first met in 2006, and married in 2009 at a ceremony held at St Paul's Cathedral. Their family chihuahuas are "majestically indulged" according to the Times. The pair purchased the 16th century grade II listed Langdon Court Hotel in 2021.

Thornton is a patron of Jeans for Genes, and helps to raise money for the charity Genetic Disorders UK.
