= Donna Ida =

London-based denim fashion brand

DONNA IDA is a London-based denim fashion brand created in 2012 by founder and namesake Donna Ida Thornton.

== History ==
The first DONNA IDA boutique opened on Draycott Avenue in Chelsea in 2006. The boutique stocked a selection of top brands including J Brand and Rag & Bone. Following the success of the Draycott Avenue boutique, three extra boutiques opened: The Village in Westfield, London, Swan Lane in Guildford and Elizabeth Street, London.

The Draycott Avenue store was refurbished in 2013 at a cost of £120,000.

== Creation of DONNA IDA ==
The fashion brand DONNA IDA was launched in 2012. The core DONNA IDA collection consists of women's designer jeans, silk blouses, cashmere jumpers and simple tees. Founder Donna Ida Thornton is regularly referred to as the 'Jean Queen'.

Notable fans of Donna Ida include Made in Chelsea regular Millie Mackintosh who, in 2012, did a photo-shoot with Donna Ida and in 2011 was seen shopping at the store.

In 2016, the DONNA IDA boutiques closed to focus on the online business and pop-up concept.

== Awards and nominations ==
- Three times nominated for Best Womenswear Boutique in the Drapers Awards
- Listed in the top 50 best boutiques outside London by The Telegraph, 2015
- Shortlisted for the WSGN Global Fashion Awards for Breakthrough Brand or Retailer 2011
- Nominated for the Cosmopolitan Best Brand Blog 2012
