= Marcus Wareing =

Chef and restaurant owner (born 1970)

Marcus Wareing MBE
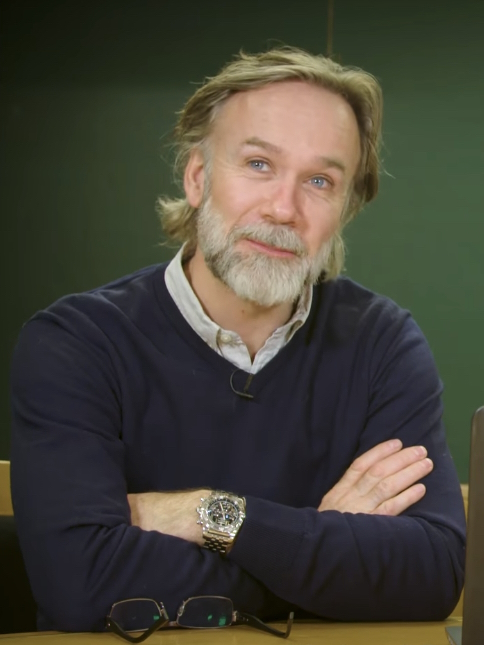
- Wareing in 2018
- Born: 29 June 1970 (age 56); Southport, Lancashire, England
- Education: City & Guilds in Catering
- Culinary career
- Cooking style: European cuisine
- Ratings
- Michelin stars AA Rosettes
- Previous restaurants
- Marcus; The Gilbert Scott; Tredwells; L’Oranger; Pétrus; Grill Room at the Savoy Hotel; Banquette; La Fleur
- Television shows
- Great British Menu; Boiling Point; Masterchef: The Professionals; Chef vs Science: The Ultimate Kitchen Challenge; Marcus Wareing's Tales from a Kitchen Garden
- Awards
- Restaurant Association's Young Chef of the Year 1995; The Catey Awards Chef of the Year 2003; Tatler Restaurateur of the Year 2004; GQ Chef of the Year 2009
- Website: Marcus Wareing Restaurants

Marcus Wareing, MBE (born 29 June 1970) is an English celebrity chef who was chef-owner of the one-Michelin-starred restaurant Marcus until its permanent closure in December 2023. Since 2014, Wareing has been a judge on MasterChef: The Professionals.

== Early life ==
Wareing was born in Southport, Lancashire, in 1970. His father was a fruit and potato merchant who had contracts with schools to provide their produce for school dinners.

At the age of 11 his first food-industry related job was with his father, packing potatoes and riding alongside deliveries. He was paid 10p per 5 pounds (2.3 kg) bag of potatoes packed, all of which went straight into his Post Office savings account. At a young age, Wareing was informed by his father that the business was no longer viable as schools moved on to using pre-prepared frozen food instead of fresh produce. He would later credit his father's long hours with inspiring his own work ethic.

At Stanley High School, he found he had a natural talent for cooking. He went on to attend Southport College, where he took a three-year City & Guilds course in catering.

== Career ==
Wareing first worked at the Savoy Hotel under chef Anton Edelmann in 1988 at the age of 18 where he was employed as a commis chef, before leaving in 1993 to join Albert Roux at Michelin starred Le Gavroche where he first met Gordon Ramsay. Stints at other Roux brothers restaurants in New York City and Amsterdam, and some time at Gravetye Manor in Sussex followed. Wareing joined Gordon Ramsay's Aubergine when it opened in 1993, where he became Sous Chef behind Head Chef Ramsay and would go on to work with him over the course of the following 15 years, which led to Wareing being called Ramsay's protégé. While he was at Aubergine in 1995, Wareing was awarded the title of Young Chef of the Year by the Restaurant Association.

He later credited Ramsay with teaching him to cook, describing it as "the most important time in my life". Wareing left Aubergine for a year in 1995 to work with Daniel Boulud in America, and Guy Savoy in France. His return to the UK was also to be his first head chef role, of new restaurant L’Oranger, which was owned by A-Z Restaurants, which had also owned Aubergine, with stakes held by both Wareing and Ramsay. At the age of 25 he earned his first Michelin star as head chef whilst at L’Oranger. He gave Angela Hartnett her first job in a restaurant.

Following a fall-out between Ramsay and A–Z Restaurants over Wareing's contract at L'Oranger, which saw Ramsay quit Aubergine to open Restaurant Gordon Ramsay, Wareing followed suit by leaving L'Oranger, forcing the restaurant into temporary closure. A–Z Restaurants commenced legal proceedings against the pair, and reopened L’Oranger with Wareing's former sous chef, Kamel Benamar, as the new head chef. The legal case ended in Ramsay and Wareing paying an out-of-court settlement to A–Z. Ramsay and Wareing worked together to open Pétrus in 1999, with Wareing becoming head chef and operating the restaurant on behalf of Gordon Ramsay Holdings (GRH), at 33 St James's Street, London. The name came from the French wine Pétrus, which was Ramsay's and Wareing's favourite. Wareing promptly regained the Michelin star he had previously held, with Pétrus being named as a one star restaurant seven months after opening.

The restaurant was moved into the Berkeley Hotel in 2003 where it replaced Pierre Koffmann's La Tante Claire, in the same year that Wareing became Chef Patron of the Grill Room at the Savoy Hotel, and he was named Chef of the Year by Caterer and Hotelkeeper's Catey Awards. The return to the Savoy meant that he was competing against Anton Edelmann, his former boss from the River Room at the hotel. Rather than serve a menu similar to the French cuisine of Pétrus, Wareing chose to continue to serve the British cuisine that the Grill Room was known for, including his version of previous menu items such as steak and kidney pudding and potted shrimps. Pétrus went on to be awarded two Michelin stars and five AA Rosettes, while the Savoy Grill achieved its first Michelin star in the hotel's history in 2004.

Wareing also opened an American-style diner at The Savoy called Banquette, and converted the previous Pétrus location into La Fleur. He was voted Restaurateur of the Year at the Tatler Restaurant Awards in 2004, and Harden's restaurant guide selected him as the fourth-best chef in London, although La Fleur closed due to problems with the lease for the site. In 2007 Pétrus was awarded its second Michelin star.

Following several months of rumours regarding the restaurant, the Berkeley Hotel confirmed in May 2008 that it was going to work with Wareing to launch his only solo restaurant, and he would take on Pétrus' lease from 19 September 2008 onwards. Wareing had previously complained of interference in the kitchen by GRH, and wanted to come out from under Ramsay's shadow, but later admitted that he had engineered the situation so that he could go out on his own. The split with Ramsay and GRH resulted in a public legal battle and feud between the three parties, which when resolved resulted in Wareing stating in an interview for Waitrose Food Illustrated magazine that Ramsay left him bitter and conflicted; "half of me thinks he’s a sad bastard and the other half still adores him." He went on to describe Ramsay as a celebrity chef who was not involved in the industry anymore.

The legal dispute was resolved with Ramsay gaining the rights to the Pétrus name, and Wareing signing a non-disclosure agreement regarding the situation but continuing to open his restaurant Marcus Wareing at The Berkeley. Wareing remarked of the situation, "If I never speak to that guy again for the rest of my life, it wouldn't bother me one bit." Ramsay later responded regarding the feud that he wishes Wareing "all the best". Wareing's self-named restaurant won the Best Restaurant in London Award by Harden's guide in 2008 and 2009, was awarded a Michelin star in 2009, and was named Time Out's restaurant of the year in 2010. The new Pétrus was opened around the corner from the Berkeley Hotel at 1 Kinnerton Street, Knightsbridge. Ramsay later joked, that with Heston Blumenthal also opening his new restaurant, Dinner by Heston Blumenthal, nearby, the three of them could "all have a fight in the street at four in the morning".

Once Marcus Wareing at The Berkeley opened in 2008, Marcus Wareing Restaurants was founded. The group has since expanded and now comprises three restaurants. In 2009 Wareing was named by GQ magazine as their chef of the year. In 2011, Wareing opened his second restaurant, The Gilbert Scott, in the St. Pancras Renaissance Hotel. GRH had also made a bid to open a restaurant in the space, but was rejected in favour of Wareing's proposal. The restaurant was named after the architect of the hotel, Sir George Gilbert Scott. Wareing believes in promoting good quality, seasonal British food in his menus, and using small suppliers.

After an extensive refurbishment in 2014, Marcus Wareing at the Berkeley reopened as Marcus. In 2014 Wareing opened Tredwells in Upper St Martin's Lane, Seven Dials, London, with Group Operations Director, Chantelle Nicholson, who also acquired the role of Chef Patron of Tredwells in June 2016. In August 2020, Chantelle and Wareing announced that Tredwells is now solely owned by Chantelle, and that he would have no further involvement. In 2021, Wareing announced the natural closure of The Gilbert Scott, after a successful 10-year lease. In September 2023, Wareing announced that his Michelin starred restaurant Marcus would close permanently at the end of the year. The restaurant’s last service took place on 26 December.

=== Television and other media ===
Wareing was first featured on television in the Channel 4 1999 documentary series Boiling Point, during his time as Gordon Ramsay's sous chef. The 2000 follow-up documentary Beyond Boiling Point documents his move to Pétrus and the award of his first Michelin star. He was also selected as one of 13 chefs chosen to recreate Leonardo da Vinci's The Last Supper in 2003. The work was photographed by John Reardon, and features Wareing throwing a brie across into the air whilst standing in the place of Simon the Zealot from Leonardo's work. In 2006, Marcus Wareing and Simon Rimmer represented the North of England in the BBC television series Great British Menu. Wareing beat the Manchester-based chef to go on to the final round. In the final the public chose for him to cook his dessert of egg custard tart with Garibaldi biscuits for the Queen's 80th birthday banquet which was on 17 June 2006.

Wareing has continued to be a judge for later seasons for the Great British Menu, something which has occasionally brought him into conflict with one of the chefs Johnnie Mountain. He has criticised some shows in the past such as MasterChef, saying that it has inspired young chefs to chase fame on television and be lazy in the kitchen, although he has appeared on MasterChef, MasterChef: The Professionals and Celebrity MasterChef in the past.

Wareing succeeded Michel Roux Jr. on the seventh series of MasterChef: The Professionals after Roux, Jr.'s contract with the BBC was terminated for advertising potatoes.

Wareing has released nine cookbooks to date. Under his new publisher, HarperCollins he released Marcus at Home (2016), which spent five weeks in The Sunday Times top ten bestseller list (cookery books), and New Classics (2017). Marcus Everyday was released in 2019 and Marcus' Kitchen came out in 2021.

In 2021, Wareing partnered with Compass Group UK & Ireland. to offer Forward with Marcus Wareing – a culinary apprenticeship programme.

In 2022, Marcus Wareing's Tales from a Kitchen Garden aired on BBC Two. It featured Wareing's East Sussex smallholding, as he visited British producers, gardeners and farmers. A second series aired in 2023.

During December 2023, Marcus Wareing At Christmas; a ten-part festive cookery series aired on Food Network.

During March 2024, the BBC commissioned Marcus Wareing Simply Provence; which aired on BBC2 and BBC iPlayer during May 2024.

== Personal life ==
Wareing's brother Brian is a catering teacher. Marcus is married to Jane, with whom he has three children, Jake, Archie, and Jessie. He met Jane while working at Gravetye Manor, where he was second chef and she was on reception. After moving to London to work with Ramsay at Aubergine, Wareing kept the relationship going by commuting out to Sussex every Sunday. Ramsay was the best man at his wedding in 2000, and is godfather to Wareing's eldest son Jake.

He has raised money for the charity Action Against Hunger, whilst working at the Taste of London festival, and in 2012 competed in a white-collar boxing charity event with other chefs and catering staff for the Hilton in the Community Foundation, having been an amateur boxer in his youth. He has lent his name to the Environmental Justice Foundation campaign to promote sustainable fishing. Wareing has said his favourite cookbook is one by chef Daniel Humm at Eleven Madison Park in New York City.

== Honours, awards and recognition ==
He was appointed Member of the Order of the British Empire (MBE) in the 2026 New Year Honours for services to the culinary arts and to broadcasting.

== Published works ==
- Wareing, Marcus; Wright, Jen (2007). How to cook the perfect... London: Dorling Kindersley. ISBN 9781405317580.
- Wareing, Marcus; Hill, Shaun; Trotter, Charlie (2008). Knife Skills. London: Dorling Kindersley. ISBN 9781405328302.
- Wareing, Marcus; Nicholson, Chantelle (2008). One Perfect Ingredient, three ways to cook it. London: Bantam. ISBN 9781405320047.
- Wareing, Marcus; Nicholson, Chantelle (2009). Nutmeg and Custard. London: Bantam. ISBN 9780593062111.
- Wareing, Marcus; Nicholson, Chantelle (2013). The Gilbert Scott Book of British Food. London: Bantam. ISBN 9780593070437.
- Wareing, Marcus; Nicholson, Chantelle (2016). Marcus at Home. London: HarperCollins. ISBN 9780008184476.
- Wareing, Marcus; Nicholson, Chantelle (2017). New Classics. London: HarperCollins. ISBN 9780008242732.
- Wareing, Marcus; Nicholson, Chantelle (2019). Marcus Everyday. London: HarperCollins. ISBN 9780008320997.
- Wareing, Marcus (2021). Marcus' Kitchen. London: HarperCollins. ISBN 9780008460969.
- Wareing, Marcus (2024). Marcus' France. London: HarperCollins. ISBN 9780008714123.
