= Down Thomas =

Village in Devon, England

Coordinates: 50.330°N 4.101°W

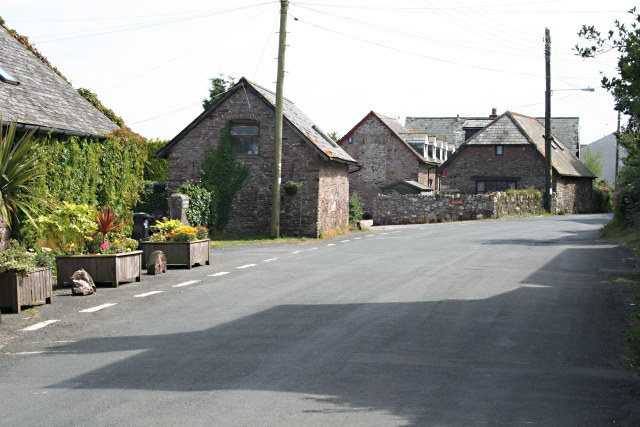
- Converted Farm Buildings in Down Thomas

- Location within Devon
- Civil parish: Wembury
- District: South Hams
- Ceremonial county: Devon
- Region: South West
- Country: England
- Sovereign state: United Kingdom
- Post town: Plymouth
- Postcode district: PL9
- UK Parliament: South West Devon

Down Thomas is a village in Devon, England. The village is situated about 4 miles south of Plymouth. It is on the Wembury peninsula and is surrounded by farmland. The village is a part of the South Hams local government district and within Wembury parish.

The village once had a chapel, pub, post office, bike shop and a local village store, but now has only a pub and a village hall within which post office services are available for two hours each Tuesday..

The population is 230. The village is mentioned in the Domesday Book.

Manor Farm was the owning building of the area. It burnt down in 1800 and the salvaged wood was used to build the new house on the same site.
