= British Hospitality Association =

UK trade association

- Abbreviation: BHA
- Predecessor: National Hotel-Keepers Association; Incorporated Hotel-Keepers Association (IHKA); Hotel & Restaurant Association of Great Britain (HRA); British Hotels and Restaurants Association (BHRA); British Hotels, Restaurants and Caterers' Association (BHRCA)
- Successor: UKHospitality
- Formation: 1907 (Incorporated 1910)
- Merger of: (1910) Incorporated Association of Hotels and Restaurants (IAHR) (1948) Residential Hotel Association (1970s) Caterers' Association (2018) Association of Licensed Multiple Retailers (ALMR)
- Type: Trade association
- Purpose: Hospitality/tourism
- Headquarters: London, England
- Region served: United Kingdom
- Members: 40,000
- Website: www.bha.org.uk

The British Hospitality Association (BHA), incorporating The Restaurant Association (RA), was a non-government representative body for hotels, clubs, restaurants, leisure outlets and other hospitality-related organisations nationwide headquartered in London, UK. In 2019 it merged with the Association of Licensed Multiple Retailers (ALMR) to form UKHospitality. The association promotes the interests of the hospitality industry to the Government Ministers, Members of Parliament (MPs), Members of the Scottish Parliament (MSPs), Members of the Senedd (MSs), MEPs, the EU Commission, the City and the Media. The association operates by membership-based system.

== History ==
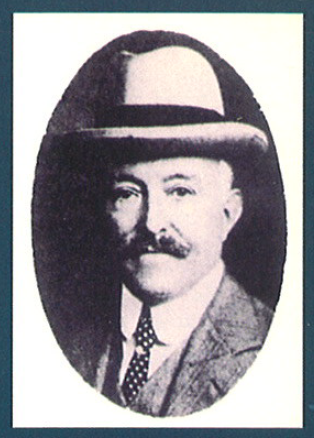
Frank Bourne-Newton (1850–1940), co-founder of the BHA

BHA traces its origins back to 1885 when James Allen, of the Queen's Hotel in Leeds, tried to establish the first association for supporting and representing the hotel industry in England. In 1891/2, the Caterer magazine took the similar attempt. However, those tries remained unsuccessful due to lack of support and interest.

In 1906, one of the main promises of the Liberal Party at the elections was to reduce drunkenness primarily by abolishing one-third of the liquor licenses in the UK. Moreover, it was proposed that the profits lost by the one-third of the licensees whose businesses were closed down would be recovered as a compensation levy from the remained two-thirds who survived. When the Liberal Party won the election with majority of 300 seats in the House of Commons, the industry faced a major disaster.

Frank Bourne-Newton, the editor, publisher and proprietor of Caterer, Hotelkeeper and Refreshment Contractors' Gazette (now Caterer and Hotelkeeper), joined together with Dudley James, manager of Morley's Hotel in Trafalgar Square (replaced by South Africa House) to form a national association which would lobby the hospitality industry's interests and defend it against attacks on existing conditions. As a result, they established National Hotel-Keepers Association in 1907, which by the end of the year was granted its certificate by the government as Incorporated Hotel-Keepers Association (IHKA). Out of thirty-six founder members, five hotels are still members of the BHA; nine are still in business (though, not always as hotels); and the remaining twenty-two have been demolished, redeveloped or destroyed during the World War II.

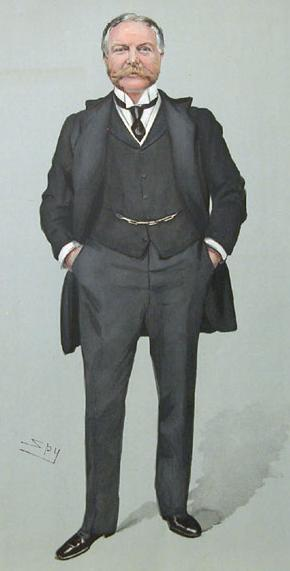
Earl of Bessborough, president of the IAHK from 1910 to 1920

The first task to undertake for the newly formed organisation was to make the Government reconsider its plans regarding the new Licensing Act. IHKA lobbied the Chancellor of the Exchequer, Herbert Asquitch, and achieved some success as the Government agreed to reduce the compensation levy for hotels to one-third that applied to the public houses. The bill was, however, vetoed by the House of Lords but eventually re-introduced years later when the upper house could no longer block it due to its reformation by The Parliament Act 1911.

From its founding to 1910, IHKA had a number of other achievements. The association fought licensing duties and tried to lobby a reduced insurance premium for members affected by the Employers' Liability Act. It ensured that the Shops Act 1911 did not affect hotels; which would have reduced the working hours to no more than twelve a day, five days a week and fourteen hours on Saturdays.

Some years later, the founders realised that the IHKA could not run any longer because it did not have sufficient funds to fight long battles with the Government. In 1910, IHKA merged with Incorporated Association of Hotels and Restaurants (IAHR), recently formed by major hoteliers, and adopted its name.

During the First World War, hotels, along with many others, were affected by the food shortage. The IAHR was the first to recommend rationing to the Government. It also raised concerns regarding enormous number of forms had to be filled by the hotels to account for the food that they used.

By the end of the World War I, the IAHR formed a parliamentary committee and the Government recognised it as the negotiating body for the industry. Once the war was over, the Chancellor of the Exchequer, Sir Austen Chamberlain, decided to introduce a new tax for luxury goods to raise money and included hotels into such category. The IAHR managed to persuade Sir Austen to drop this plan at the Committee stage.

In the mid-1920s, IAHR introduced its regional divisions to provide all members with more control of the specific efforts needed in their areas.

In 1926, the association decided to change its name again and became the Hotel & Restaurant Association of Great Britain (HRA). In 1948 it combined with the Residential Hotel Association (founded 1918) to form the British Hotels and Restaurants Association (BHRA).

When Prince George, Duke of Kent gave a toast at the 22nd Annual Luncheon, HRH commented the association's work by saying that "The hotel industry is important as a dispenser of happiness. With resolution on your part to provide the service required, there is no reason why the hotel trade in Great Britain should not enter into a new era of prosperity".

The bombing of the Second World War had a serious effect on the hotel industry as many hotels were destroyed. It includes some notable names such as the Carlton (now New Zealand House). The association and the industry struggled but when the war was over, HRA worked hard to obtain a fair share of the building materials for refurbishments.

In the early 1970s, HRA merged with the Caterer's Association and was renamed as British Hotels, Restaurants and Caterers' Association (BHRCA). In a few years, BHRCA claimed to represent over half of the hotels with 5+ bedrooms across the UK. In the late 1980s, the association changed its name to its present form, the British Hospitality Association (designed by Saatchi and Saatchi), to make it shorter, be modern and reflect the wider industry it represents.

Other successful campaigns include fighting a proposal by the EU to prevent business travellers from claiming VAT back and a proposal that hotels must pay more for television licences. At present, the BHA represents 40,000 establishments with over 500,000 employees across the UK (excluding NI); which includes hotels, restaurants, clubs, catering companies, food & service management and leisure outlets. Members range from independent businesses (73% of total number of members) to international groups (8%).

One of the main agendas for the association in 2011 is a campaign to reduce the level of VAT charged to hotel rooms and attractions to increase competitiveness of the UK hospitality against other EU members which mostly charge a lower VAT rate for accommodation and food served in restaurants.

=== Restaurant Association ===
In 1967, a group of restaurateurs led by Rafael Calzada, proprietor of the Caprice, supported by Madame Prunier, proprietor of the Prunier's Restaurant (now Marco Pierre White's Luciano) and Manny Franks, who ran a small restaurant chain, claimed that BHRA (as it then was) ignored restaurants and decided to establish a new separate organisation, called the Restaurant Association of Great Britain (RAGB), which would represent solely restaurants interests. For nearly forty years, RAGB continued to represent the industry. However, due to the lack of support from major food chains, high costs and the need to present a united front, the RAGB had to merge with the BHA in 2003.

== Structure ==
Apart from the head office in London, BHA operates a number of committees. Committees gather on a regular basis to discuss current activities and 'to shape BHA policy'. Typically, they consist of a chairman and between 20 and 25 company representatives. Each of them must be a BHA member and voted on an annual election process held by the association. Until 2012, there were two main committees that would oversee association's day-to-day business - the BHA Council and the BHA National Executive. Both, however, were abolished at the Extraordinary General Meeting on 3 May in favour of a new board of directors. Some positions such as BHA President and BHA National Chairman were subsequently abolished as well.

There are 16 additional committees working with specific issues, sector or a region. As for 2011, the full list of committees is as follows.

Sector Committees:

- Food and Service Management Forum
- Local Hospitality Associations Committee
- Restaurant Association National Committee
- Motorway Services Area Operators' Committee
- Clubs Panel

Regional Committees:

- BHA Scotland Committee
- BHA Wales Committee
- Northern Regional Committee
- Heart of England Regional Committee
- Eastern Regional Committee
- South East Regional Committee
- South West Regional Committee
- London

Policy Led Committees:

- Employment Committee
- Food and Technical Committee
- Sustainability Committee

== Membership ==
BHA has no special requirements to its prospective members regarding size. All the members must be within the United Kingdom (however, the overseas membership is possible in certain cases) and be hospitality-related. Nevertheless, educational establishments, suppliers, etc. can also join the association as affiliate members and receive the same benefits. Membership is annual and possible to join year-round. There is a range of rates depending on the type of an organisation and its size, starting from £100 a year.

The primary aim of the association is to lobby industry's interests and to protect it from harmful legislation; however, it also offers some other benefits and services to its members.

- All members receive a copy of all publications for free.
- All members have free access (or at least substantial discounts) to the events organised by the BHA.
- The association works in partnership with a number of organisations that provide services relevant to the industry in order to obtain special deals and discounts.
- The BHA consults its members on health, legal and safety matters.
- The association also updates all members on legislation that affects them and sends out regular business updates containing information regarding trends and developments in the industry.
- Another service includes a free access to webinars where members can receive information regarding a number of issues including Fire Safety, Fraud, Employment Law, etc.

== Partners ==
Patrons
Along with BHA's members, BHA Patrons play a key role in supporting the association in its lobbying activities and day-to-day business. They also add some tangible benefits to the membership by providing special and exclusive services. The list of patrons includes some well-known companies such as Santander, Nestlé, Philips, Coca-Cola and American Express.

Preferred suppliers
Preferred suppliers provide BHA members with preferential rates on their services, discounts and special offers. At present, there are about 30 preferred suppliers working with the BHA.

== Publications ==
=== Annual (Monthly) Report ===
The British Hospitality Association publishes a number of periodicals. The oldest publication is a Monthly Report which later became Annual Report and has been issued since December, 1913. The association saw a need in informing the members about its work but faced a problem as some of the matters discussed at the committee meetings were not possible to publish publicly. Therefore, the association decided to print its own monthly periodical. First Monthly reports were private and intended for members only. Each copy was numbered with the number of the member to whom it was sent. All copies issued prior to 1950s consisted of information regarding committee meetings, advertising (e.g. hotels for sale), advice (e.g. rationing during war years), legal updates, new members, etc. Since 1950, the report has become annual.

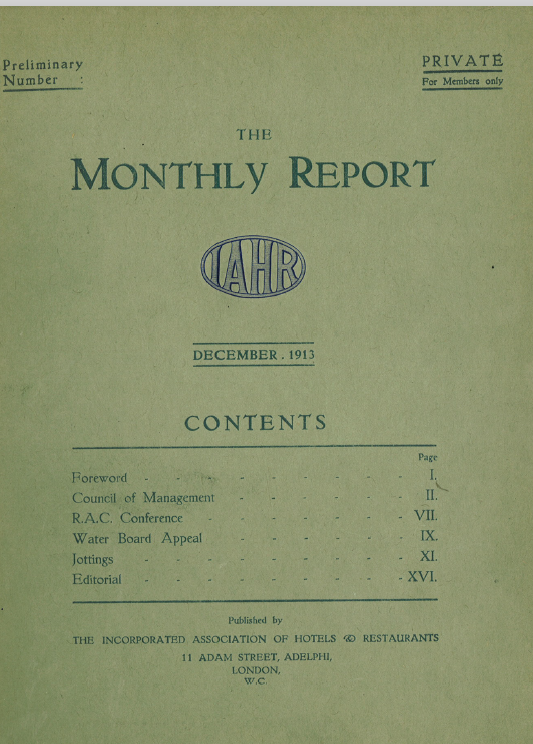
Cover of a first-ever Monthly Report, December 1913

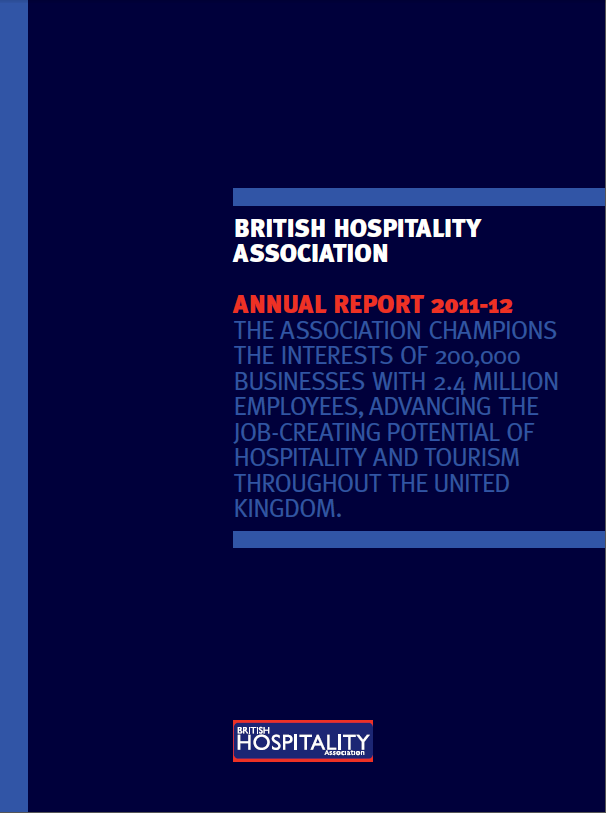
Cover of an Annual Report, July 2012

=== Trends and Developments Report ===
Trends and Development (Statistics) is an annual report that has been issued since 1990. The report brings together statistics regarding the World Tourism and Hospitality industry. Such as, for example, employment levels, size of inbound, outbound & domestic tourism and financial highlights of the UK hotel, restaurant & catering industries.

=== Creating Jobs in Britain – A Hospitality Economy Proposition ===
Creating Jobs in Britain is a report by the BHA that highlighted the hospitality's contribution to the UK economy and stated that the industry can generate as many as 236,000 additional jobs if the Government provides the right framework.

=== BHRA Hotel and Restaurant Guide ===
In 1928, the association published its first guide to member hotels in Britain, Ireland, British dominions and colonies. The guide consisted of a short information regarding the prices charged for rooms, food, etc., size of an establishment, facilities such as telephone or running water, contact details and so forth. Later issues also included a road map and road mileage between major UK cities. Cover pages were highly influenced by culture and economic situation. Thus, 1947 version has all the signs of post war austerity when a copy issued in 1974 was visibly influenced by 1960s psychedelia movement. The publication was ceased in 1997.

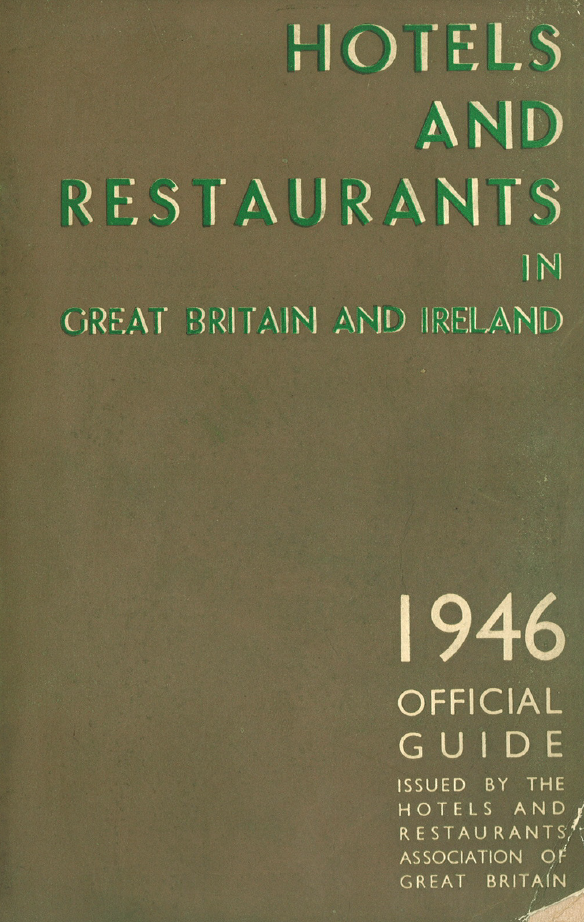
1946 cover of Official Guide of British Hotels with all signs of post-war austerity

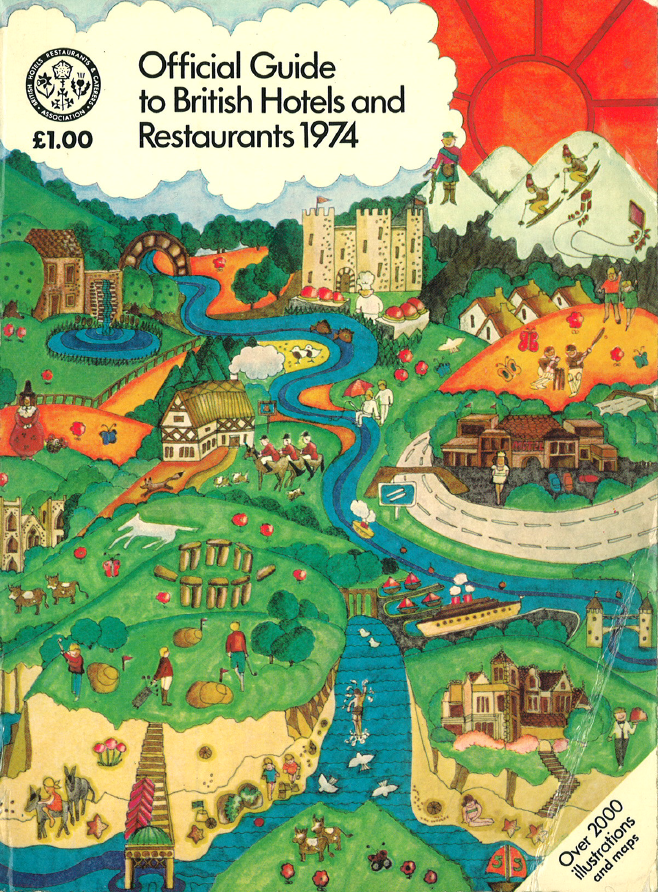
1974 cover of Official Guide of British Hotels influenced by 1960s psychedelia movement

=== Magazines ===
- British Hotelier and Restaurateur (1961–1991)
- The Voice (1992–1996)
- Hospitality Matters. The voice of the British Hospitality Association (2000–2006)

== Events ==
=== Hospitality and Tourism Summit ===
The Hospitality and Tourism Summit is aimed at underlining the economic importance of the hospitality industry within the UK economy and showcasing how other organisations can benefit from the Tourism industry. The first-ever The Hospitality and Tourism Summit 2012 was held at the InterContinental Park Lane, London on Friday 1 June and was attended by around 500 industry leaders, national and international government officials and others. The summit was followed by a Gala Diner. The event was free of charge for BHA members when all other tickets were on sale for around £500. The 2012 event attracted some well-known names including, for example, John Penrose MP (The UK Minister for Tourism & Heritage), Kit Malthouse (The Deputy Mayor of London), Willie Walsh (CEO, British Airways), Taleb Rifai (Secretary of the UN World Tourism Organisation), Simon Vincent (Europe President of Hilton), Robin Rowland (CEO of Yo!Sushi), etc.

=== Young Chef Young Waiter ===
Young Chef Young Waiter (YCYW) is an annual skills competition for youths launched in 1984 which makes it the longest-established competition in the UK hospitality industry. The event is organised by the Restaurant Association. Entrants must be 25 years old or under and work for a hotel or a restaurant which is a member of the BHA. The competition is divided into three stages. First two are the regional finals held separately for Northern and Southern regions and the third is a national final followed by the award ceremony in London. At the regional finals chefs are being marked on their cooking skills and theoretical knowledge when waiters are tested on their service abilities (including wine, coffee, cheese knowledge), followed by a skills interview. As for the national final, succeeded chefs and waiters are put into pairs to prepare and serve lunch for the invited guests. In 2011, the RA broadened the award categories, and besides 1st, 2nd and 3rd places for each waiters and chefs, it gives prizes for Best Barista, Best Cheese Knowledge & Best Wine Knowledge for waiters and Best Dessert, Best Original Dish & Best Kitchen Craft for chefs.

Presently, the Head Judge Chef is Adam Handling and the Head Judge Waiter is Simon King. The chairman of the competition is Robert Walton MBE.

Past winners and judges of the competition include:

- Theo Randall
- Mark Sargaent
- Marcus Wareing
- John Torode
- Raymond Blanc OBE
- Heston Blumenthal OBE
- Lord Forte
- Fred Sireix

=== Annual Luncheon ===
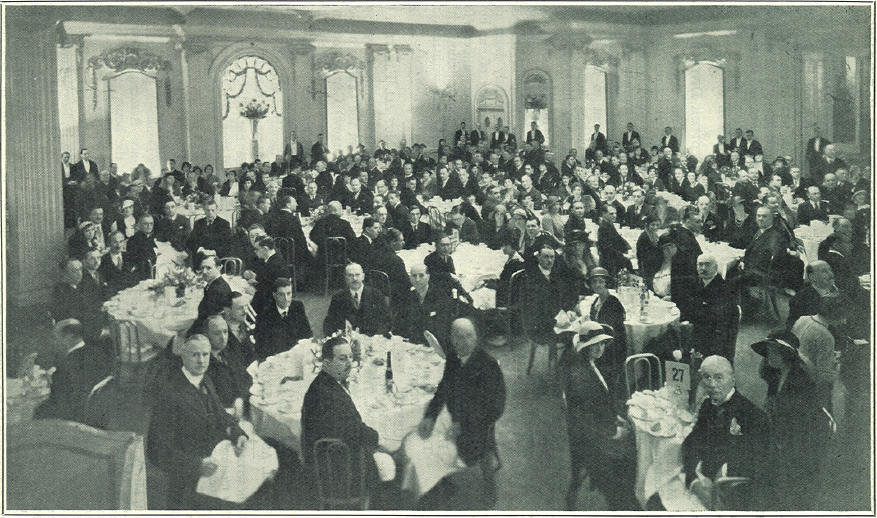
22nd Annual Luncheon 1932 at Grosvenor House, London

Annual Luncheon is an event that the organisation has been holding every year since its incorporation in 1910. During such gathering, all BHA members as well as those who 'play a big role in supporting' the organisation are invited for a champagne reception followed by lunch. The most recent Annual Lunch was held at the 22nd of June 2011 at The Grosvenor House Hotel, London and was attended by 800 guests (including the BHA staff). The tickets were, however, not free even for members and were on sale for £155 per person.

=== National Restaurateur's Dinner ===
National Restaurateur's Dinner (NRD) is a fund-raising event that has been taken place annually since 1987. The event is organised by three associations: the BHA, the Academy of Culinary Arts and the Academy of Food and Wine. All the profits collected from ticket sales and donations are used for training and educational programmes for chefs and waiters including the YCYW. NRD 2012 raised £40,000, one-third of which were allocated to the BHA.
