= Wembury =

Village in Devon, England

Coordinates: 50.31686°N 4.08298°W

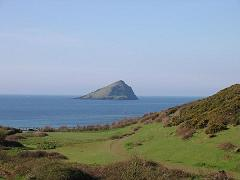
- The Mewstone

- Location within Devon
- Population: 2,740 (2011)
- OS grid reference: SX518484
- District: South Hams
- Shire county: Devon
- Region: South West
- Country: England
- Sovereign state: United Kingdom
- Post town: Plymouth
- Postcode district: PL9
- Dialling code: 01752
- Police: Devon and Cornwall
- Fire: Devon and Somerset
- Ambulance: South Western
- UK Parliament: South West Devon

Wembury is a village on the south coast of Devon, England, very close to Plymouth Sound. Wembury is located south of Plymouth. Wembury is also the name of the peninsula in which the village is situated. The village lies in the administrative district of the South Hams within the South Devon Area of Outstanding Natural Beauty (AONB). The South West Coast Path goes past the coastal end of the town. The National Trust has taken an active role in maintaining the scenic and historic characteristics of the village and its surrounding area

The beach is well known for its surfing and rock pooling. Wembury Marine Centre educates visitors about what they can find in the rockpools and how they can help protect and preserve them. The centre is managed by Devon Wildlife Trust and was refurbished in 2006. Basking sharks can be seen in the summer near the Mewstone. There is also Wembury primary school.

There are three pubs within the Wembury parish; the Eddystone Inn, Mussell Inn and the Odd Wheel (the Oddy). Three shops are also in Wembury.

Its electoral ward is called 'Wembury and Brixton'. The ward population at the 2011 census was 4,455.

== History ==
Wembury was visited by Mesolithic man as evidenced by flint implements found on local sites. Some Roman coins have also been found.

The name Wembury may derive from a place name containing the name Woden, and John Mitchell Kemble notes that it was called Wódnesbeorh.

Saxons colonised south-west Devon during the 7th century and founded agricultural settlements here. There was also a church dedicated to Saint Werburgh, a Saxon saint, in the area, an alternative derivation for the name.

Wembury expanded vastly in the 20th century with areas of farmland sold off for housing. Some older buildings are still present in the village, mainly in Knighton and West Wembury.

== Wembury in the public eye ==
Wembury is mentioned in The Forsyte Saga by John Galsworthy. Galsworthy visited Wembury as part of his research for the book, he was intensely interested in his own origins and descent through a long line of Devon farmers who farmed in Wembury for three hundred years from the 17th century to the late 19th century.

Wembury was used as a location in the filming of the Comic Strip's parody Five Go Mad on Mescalin. In the film the Mewstone can be clearly seen.

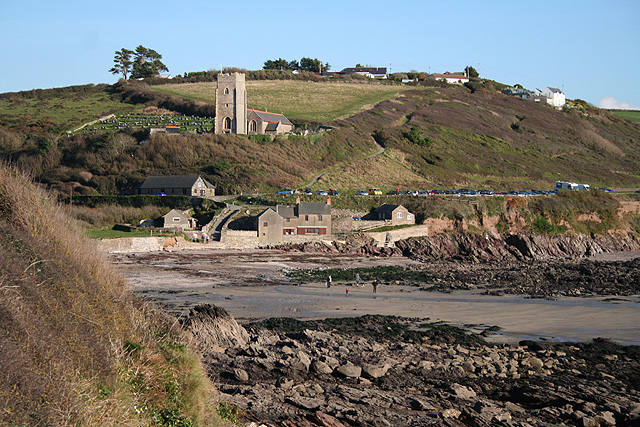
St Werburgh's Church Above the beach

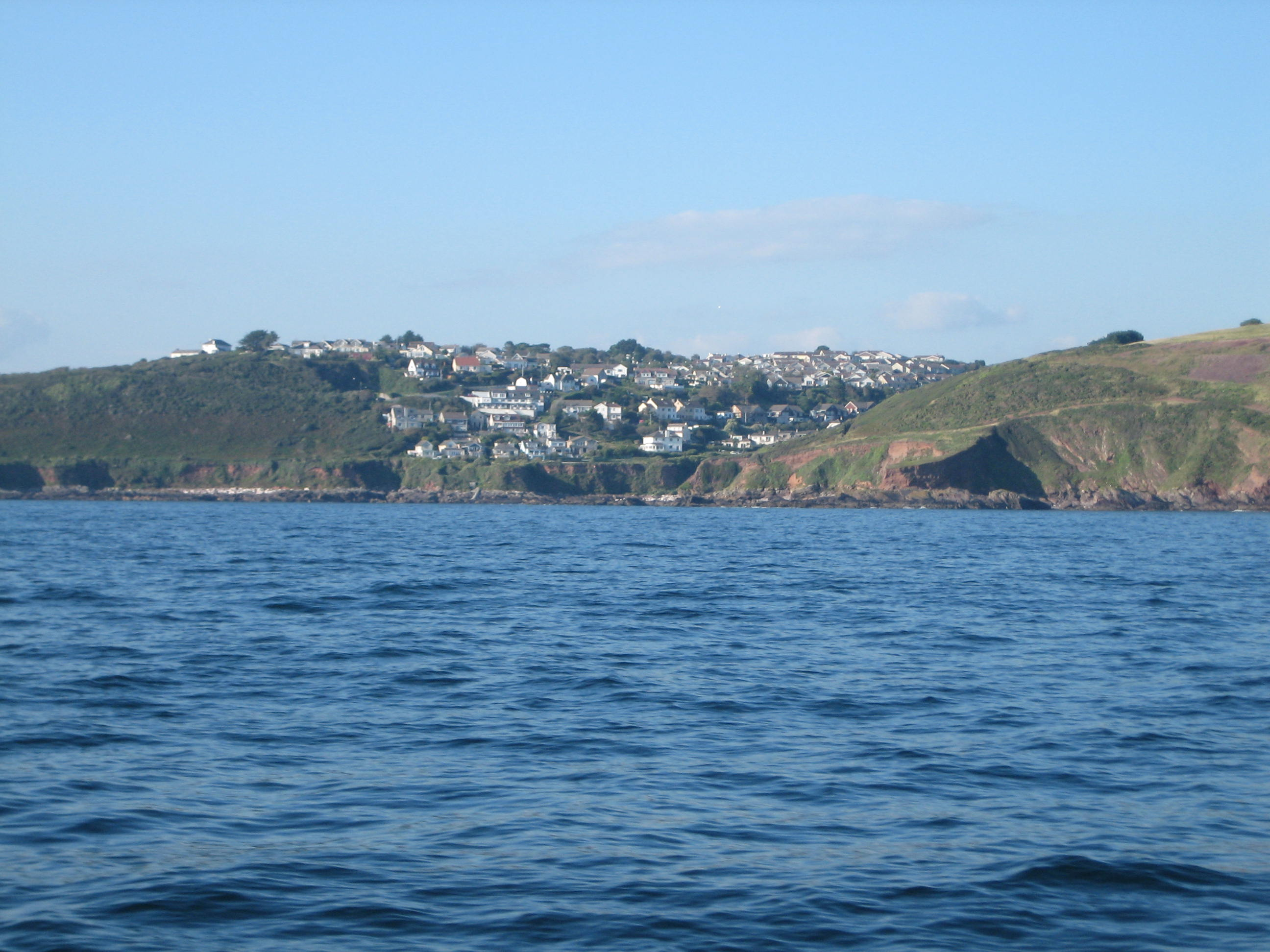
Heybrook Bay, Wembury parish, from the sea

== Wembury parish ==
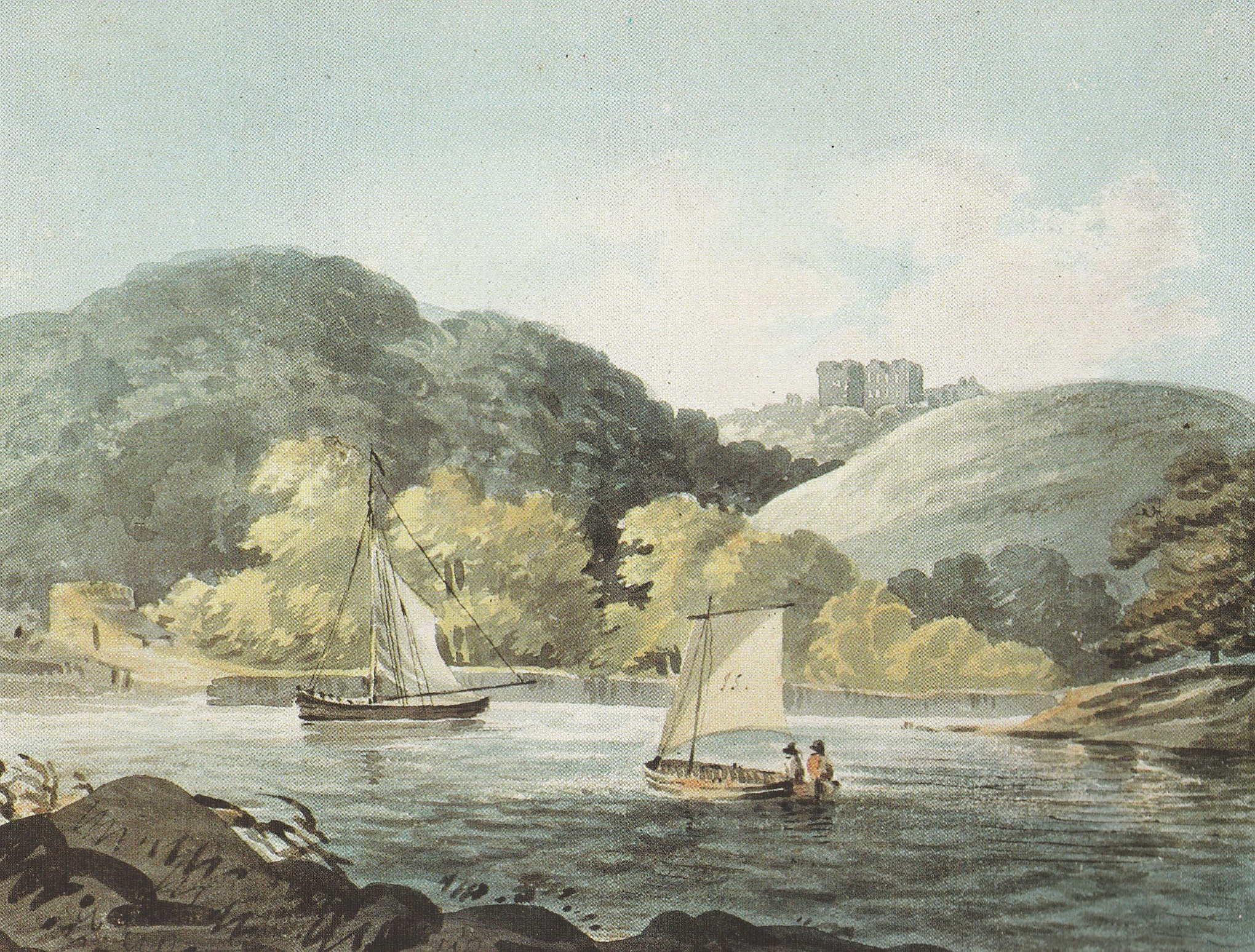
1797 watercolour by Rev. John Swete (d.1821) of the ruins of Wembury House, built by Sir John Hele

The parish of Wembury was once divided into four manors: Wembury, Down Thomas, Langdon and Alfelmeston. According to Lyson's Devonshire, published in 1822, the manor of Wembury originally belonged to Plympton Priory. After the dissolution of the monasteries in 1539 it went into private ownership.

Today the parish of Wembury is divided into three principal villages; Wembury, Down Thomas, and Heybrook Bay. There are also a number of smaller hamlets; Hollacombe, Knighton, Thorn, Langdon, Andurn and Bovisand. The population of the parish was 2740 during the 2011 census.

Wembury House survives as an elegant late Georgian mansion, originally an exceptionally grand Elizabethan house built by the lawyer Sir John Hele (c.1541–1608) a Member of Parliament for Exeter and Recorder of Exeter (1592–1605). It was already a ruin by about 1700, and was finally demolished in 1803. The surviving house on the site was built in the early 19th century and rebuilt by Major Edmund Lockyer.

Fort Bovisand, an ancient monument lies in the North West corner of the parish. The first fort on this site was built in 1845. Plans have been approved for the conversion of Bovisand Fort and associated buildings, removal of one building, and construction of new towers, an apartment building, 11 new dwellings, new quayside commercial accommodation and conservation of historic fabric, together with associated landscaping, parking and re-establishment of the link to the coastal footpath, creating a total of 81 residential units, office, teaching/studio space, event space, visitor centre and facilities, café and relocation of MOD space and additional commercial space.

== The Mewstone ==
A distinctive feature visible from Wembury Beach is the Mewstone, a triangular island which is uninhabited. In the past it has been host to a prison and a private home, as well as a refuge for local smugglers. Its most infamous resident was Sam Wakeman who, in 1744, avoided transportation to Australia in favour of the cheaper option of transportation to the Mewstone, where he was interned for seven years. After his internment on the island he remained there paying his rent by supplying rabbits for the Manor House table. It is said Sam Wakeman is responsible for carving the rough stone steps to the summit of the Mewstone.

The island was painted several times by J. M. W. Turner after sketching it during a sailing trip from Plymouth in 1813. The Mewstone, painted between 1823 and 1826, was left to the nation by the Turner Bequest and is in the collection of Tate Britain. A watercolour of about 1814 in the National Gallery of Ireland, Dublin is entitled The Mew Stone, at the Entrance of Plymouth Sound, Devonshire. Another watercolour traditionally known as Storm off Margate in a private collection, is now accepted to be a view of The Mewstone. A further Turner painting that had been identified as the Bass Rock in the Firth of Forth was re catalogued as The Mewstone when it was auctioned by Christie's in 2008.

The Great Mewstone and Little Mewstone are now a bird sanctuary and access is not permitted to visitors.
