= Nicol (surname) =

Nicol is a surname. Notable people with the surname include:

- Adam Nicol (born 1997), Scottish rugby player
- Alex Nicol (1916–2001), American actor
- Alexander Lee Nicol (1895–1967), American politician
- Alfred Nicol, English footballer
- Alphonse Nicol, French footballer
- Andrew Nicol (born 1951), British judge
- Andy Nicol (born 1971), Scottish rugby player
- Archie Nicol (1865–1941), Scottish footballer
- Bob Nicol, Canadian curler
- Bobby Nicol (1936–2012), Scottish footballer
- Broc Nicol (born 1998), American speedway rider
- Bruce M. Nicol (1913–1987), Scottish physician and nutrition scientist
- C. W. Nicol (1940–2020), Welsh-born Japanese writer
- Charles Nicol (1940–2020), American literary scholar
- Christine Nicol, British author, academic and researcher
- Dave Nicol (musician), Canadian folk singer
- Davidson Nicol (1924–1994), Sierra Leonean academic, diplomat, physician, writer and poet
- Donald Nicol (1923–2003), English Byzantinist
- Donald Nicol (MP) (1843–1903), Scottish politician
- Eduardo Nicol (1907–1990), Spanish-Mexican philosopher
- Emma Nicol (1800–1877), British actress
- Eric Nicol (1919–2011), Canadian writer and humorist
- Erskine Nicol (1825–1904), Scottish painter
- Evelyn Nicol (1930–2020), American immunologist and microbiologist
- George Nicol (athlete) (1886–1967), British sprinter
- George Nicol (bookseller) (1740?–1828), British publisher and bookseller
- George Nicol (baseball) (1870–1924), Major League Baseball player
- George Nicol (footballer) (1903–1968), Scottish footballer
- George William Nicol (1810–1884), African colonial secretary of Sierra Leone
- George Gurney Nicol, Sierra Leonean clergyman
- Graham Nicol (1907–1990), Australian politician
- Greg Nicol (born 1975), South African field hockey player
- Hector Nicol (1920–1985), Scottish Comedian
- Helen Nicol (1920–2021), Canadian-American baseball pitcher
- Helen Nicol (suffragist) (1854–1932), New Zealand suffragist
- Henri Nicol, 19th-century officer of the French Navy
- Henry Nicol (1845–1880), British philologist
- Herbert Nicol (1873–1950), British rugby union player
- Hugh Nicol (1858–1921), American baseball player
- Hugh Nicol (chemist)]] (1898-1972), British chemist
- Jacob Nicol (1876–1958), Canadian politician
- James Nicol (geologist) (1810–1879), Scottish geologist
- James Nicol (minister) (1769–1819), Scottish poet
- James Dyce Nicol (1805–1872), Scottish politician
- Jason Nicol (born 1973), Expert Clio Admitistrator.
- Jimmie Nicol (born 1939), British drummer and temporary member of the Beatles
- John Nicol (1755-1825), Scottish sailor
- Johnny Nicol (born 1938), Australian jazz singer
- Julia Nicol (1956–2019), South African activist
- Ken Nicol (musician) (born 1951), English musician
- Ken Nicol (politician) (born 1944), Canadian politician
- Kevin Nicol (born 1982), Scottish footballer
- Leigh Nicol (born 1995), Scottish footballer
- Lesley Nicol (actress) (born 1953), English actress
- Lesley Rumball (born 1973 as Lesley Nicol), New Zealand netball player
- Macleod Nicol (born 1958), British luger
- Madalena Nicol (1919–1996), Brazilian actress
- Mal Nicol (born 1997), Scottish television personality
- Mary Leakey (1913–1996, born as Mary Douglas Nicol), British anthropologist
- Mike Nicol (born 1951), South African writer and journalist
- Nelly Nicol, American politician
- Olive Nicol, Baroness Nicol (1923–2018), British politician
- Pat Nicol (1935–2023), Canadian politician
- Peter Nicol (born 1973), British squash player
- Phil Nicol (born 1953), Welsh painter
- Phyllis Nicol (1908–1999), British high jumper
- Phyllis Mary Nicol (1903–1964), Australian physics professor
- Rachel Nicol (physician) (1845–1881), American physician
- Rachel Nicol (swimmer) (born 1993), Canadian swimmer
- Rob Nicol (born 1983), New Zealand cricketer
- Robina Nicol (1861–1942), New Zealand photographer
- Ron Nicol (born 1953), American businessman
- Sarah Bezra Nicol (died after 1834), British actress
- Simon Nicol (born 1950), English folk rock musician
- Steve Nicol (born 1961), Scottish footballer
- Stuart Nicol (born 1966), Australian footballer
- Thomas Nicol (1846–1916), Scottish professor
- Thomas Nicol (anatomist) (1900–1983), Scottish anatomist
- Tom Nicol (1870–1915), Scottish footballer
- W. W. J. Nicol (1855–1929), Scottish chemist and photographer
- Walter Nicol (1769–1811), Scottish garden and greenhouse designer
- William Nicol (geologist) (1770–1851), Scottish physicist and geologist
- William Nicol (surgeon) (1790–1879), Scottish surgeon and politician
- William Nicol (Transvaal) (1887–1967), clergyman and Governor of the Transvaal
- William Nicol (teacher) (1744–1797), Scottish schoolmaster
