= Hospitality industry in the United Kingdom =

The hospitality industry in the United Kingdom is largely represented by the country's hotels, pubs, restaurants and leisure companies, and produces around 4% of UK GDP.

== Output ==
There are over 207,000 eating venues in England, and around 25% of these are fast-food outlets.

According to the British Beer and Pub Association, around 8.5 billion pints of beer were sold, with 7.4 billion 175ml glasses of wine, and 1.2 billion pints of cider in the UK in 2018. Beer has 54 pence of duty per pint. There are around 2530 breweries in the UK. In late 2022 Guinness took over from Carling as the UK's favourite drink. One in nine pints bought is Guinness. 1% of beer sold in pubs is alcohol-free; including supermarket sales, it is 2% across the UK

In 2022 the hospitality industry was the 3rd biggest employer in the UK, accounting for 3.5m jobs through direct employment, and a further 3.0m indirectly.

In 2022 the UK hospitality industry paid around £54bn in tax receipts.

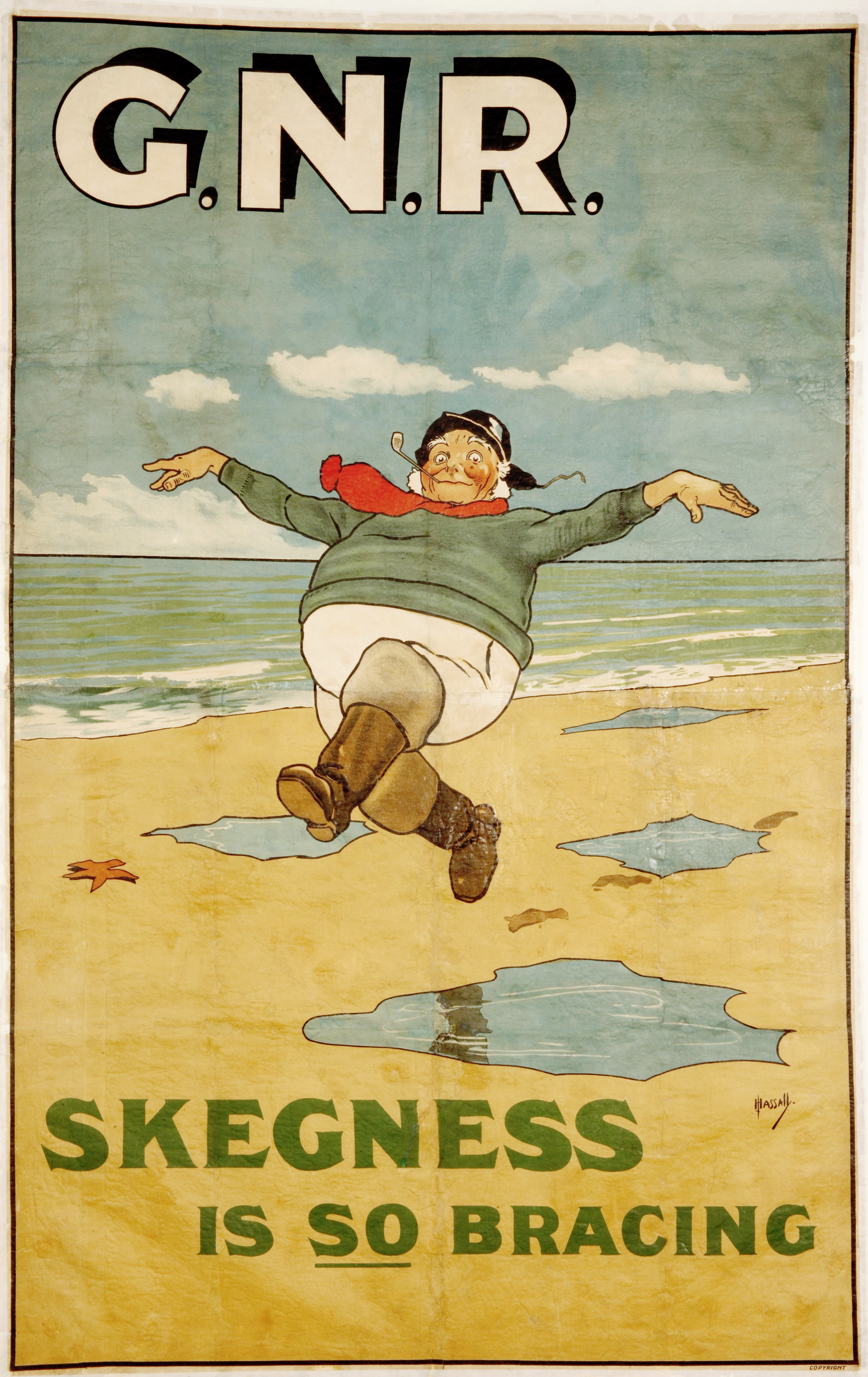
The 1908 seaside poster for Skegness in Lincolnshire

The UK tourist industry is the 8th largest tourism destination in the world. VisitBritain is responsible for tourists to the UK. In 2022 there were around 31.2 million overseas visitors to the UK.

It is not one of the larger industries, by GDP, in the UK.

== Training ==
In 1944 a two year course in hotels began, later to become the Scottish Hotel School, supported by the Hotel and Restaurants Association. This was decided at a meeting in April 1944 of the Scottish section of the Hotel and Restaurants Association at the North British Station Hotel in Edinburgh (now the Balmoral Hotel).

After the war, the Catering Trades Education Committee, set up in 1944 with its first meet on February 7 1944 and funded by the Board of Education, realised that staff for factory canteens would need different training to those for first class hotels. The Catering Trades Education Committee and Hotel and Restaurants Association jointly formed a syllabus for a general catering course for under 18 year olds, which did not need to be too advanced. The hotel syllabus would be similar to the Lausanne Hotel School (École hôtelière de Lausanne). The Tourist Board began after the war.

130 candidates took the first City & Guilds cookery exams in 1947, with 1,033 by 1950. This was C&G 150 Canteen Catering. A Hotel and Catering Department opened at Bournemouth in 1960. South Devon Technical College at Torquay started a two year catering course at the Central School of Domestic Economy. There were also two year catering courses at the Royal Technical College Salford and Borough Polytechnic (later London South Bank University). The RAF Cookery School was at RAF Halton, training to C&G 151/152.

The Hotel and Catering Institute was formed in November 1949. Apprenticeships largely began in 1952. Training in nutrition for catering teachers began at the Northern Polytechnic London. The Hotel and Catering Institute had a three day international conference in July 1970, led by Dr John Fuller, head of the Scottish Hotel School.

The former Hotel and Catering Industry Training Board was formed on 7 November 1966 and became the Hospitality Training Foundation, which ultimately became People 1st on 19 May 2004; it is the industry's sector skills council. In 2002 around eighty National Training Organisations (NTOs) became around twenty SSCs. The Council for Hospitality Management Education conversely has an international outlook.

The National Skills Academy for Food & Drink (NSAFD) is at York. The Institute of Hospitality was known as HCIMA - Hotel and Catering International Management Association, which became the IoH in April 2007. The Hotel and Catering Institute was founded in 1949; the professional body merged with the Institutional Management Association in 1971. Hotel, Restaurant & Catering (HRC) is a main national event.

Greene King and Mitchells & Butlers are two of the biggest apprenticeship providers in the UK, with around 1,500 each; only the armed forces, BT and HMRC have more numbers of apprenticeships. There are single awards GCSE Catering and GCSE Hospitality, or the double award GCSE Hospitality and Catering.

Victor Ceserani MBE pioneered catering education in the UK, when he was head of catering at Ealing College, now part of University of West London; this had been Acton Hotel and Catering School until 1957 and trained many airline catering staff; he wrote The Theory of Catering and Practical Cookery, with Ronald Kinton and David Foskett (academic).

=== Colleges ===
Leicester College claim to be the East Midlands leading training school for catering and food manufacturing. Kendal College also claims to train top chefs, and also Bournemouth and Poole College. The School of Culinary Arts and Hospitality of the Victoria Centre of Westminster Kingsway College is known for catering; it was the first culinary arts school in the UK in 1910. Westminster Hotel School is an important training site.

=== Higher education ===
The University of Strathclyde had the Scottish Hotel School in the late 1960s. Strathclyde and the University of Surrey were the first two universities in UK to have hotel and catering management courses, both at the same time. Switzerland was the only other European country with a similar university course. The University of Surrey moved to its present site in 1968 and was the first in the UK to offer a course for hotel and catering: a BSc in hotel and catering management, with a 48-week professional year starting in the March of the second year; the course was led by Brian Archer from 1978. Cardiff and Ulster universities had hospitality training in the 1980s.

Another important places for catering was the Dorset Institute of Higher Education, since 1992 being known as Bournemouth University, and in the 1980s the polytechnics of Leeds, Huddersfield, Sheffield City, Manchester, North London, and Middlesex.

== Hotels ==
The Royal National Hotel in Bloomsbury is the fourth-largest hotel in Europe, and the largest hotel in the UK, with around 1,600 rooms; there are three other hotels in London with over 1,000 rooms, with another being the Park Plaza Westminster Bridge. The Old Bell, Malmesbury claims to be oldest hotel in England, from 1220.

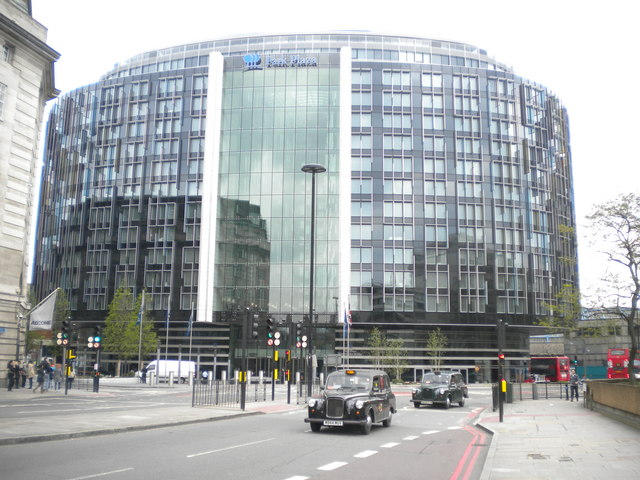
The 1,019-room Park Plaza Westminster Bridge hotel in April 2011; it is owned by PPHE Hotel Group, and next to the Thames in Lambeth

The 39-storey Novotel London Canary Wharf (40 Marsh Wall) is the tallest purpose-built hotel in the UK, at 419 feet; it is the tallest Novotel hotel (owned by Accor); it opened in April 2017; it has beehives on the 39th floor, which produce fresh honey for guests; Novotel has thirty three hotels in the UK. The world's tallest hotel is the 356m Gevora Hotel, built in 2017.

=== History ===
In 1949 Francis Coulson and Brian Sack opened the Sharrow Bay Country House on Ullswater, Britain's first country house hotel. In 1978 Blakes Hotel opened, Britain's first boutique hotel, by Anouska Hempel.

From 1954 to 1960, there had been a steep rise in overseas tourists to the UK, but that had levelled off from 1960. The 1964 Labour government introduced punitive tax changes for the hospitality industry. It abolished investment allowances in January 1966, and in September 1966 introduced Selective Employment Tax, which was not levied on other industries, such as manufacturing. In late 1966, the Overseas Travel Allowance was reduced from £250 to £50.

Although the British hotel industry, in the early 1960s, was not growing that vigorously, by 1968 and 1969 hotels in London, during the summer, were largely operating to capacity, from overseas visitors.

In London in the mid-1970s, the hotel sector was barely breaking even due to inflation, and not enough tourists. The 1972 Fire Precautions legislation had introduced significant costs for some older hotels.

In July 1990 Accor, of France, became the world's largest operator of hotel rooms, with around 160,000, when it bought Motel 6 of the US.

=== Motels ===
Motels began in the mid-1950s, largely by Watney Lyon; there were 120 motels in 1967.

The Royal Oak Motel at Newingreen on the A20, near Lympne, in Kent, was the first of the Lyon motels, opened on June 2 1953.

Watney built a motel at the former Vine Inn at Ower in Hampshire, with Lyon Hotels to become the 'New Forest Motel', which opened on July 21 1955. Matford House, at Alphington, Devon on the Exeter bypass, cost £35,000, built with Lyon Hotels. This was an extremely busy road in the summer. This motel opened on November 17 1955 as the 'Devon Motel'. Watney Lyon Hotels was subsequently formed in 1961.

In 1961, staying at Royal Oak Motel, Kent, cost 32s 6d. In the early 1960s Watney built two motels at Epping and Frome. John Moore-Brabazon, 1st Baron Brabazon of Tara opened the Epping Forest motel on July 30 1962 on the A11, near the Epping tube station. The 'Mendip Hotel' was opened by Watney north of Frome in 1962, at the former White House hotel, opposite Frome Community College (former Frome Grammar School).

Bass built its first motel at Nuneaton in 1964 on the A5 and the 'Marton Way' in Middlesbrough in 1965, and at Oulton, West Yorkshire in 1966.

Esso Motels were formed in 1963. In 1971 there were five Esso Motor Hotels, at Luton and Runcorn, with three more motels planned costing £3m at Bristol, Coventry and Erskine. Esso Motels was bought by Bass in 1973.

In January 1961 Forte announced that it would build a series of motels, starting with around nine, to cost around £250,000 each, under Motor Lodge Developments. The first Forte motor lodge was a 304-room £2m motel at Heathrow 'The Excelsior', which opened on March 12 1964; a 200-bed motel, 'Excelsior', opened at Manchester Airport in May 1965. Some Forte motels had swimming pools.

The airport Forte Excelsior motels were jointly-owned by the airline BEA (later BA from 1974). The seventh Excelsior Airport Hotel, with 60 beds, at Birmingham Airport, opened on December 17 1968, with the eighth Excelsior, with 320 beds, to open at Glasgow Airport in 1970, costing £1.5m with ten storeys, with another to open at Belfast. Forte also operated Airport Catering Services with BEA. By 1970 Forte jointly operated three overseas hotels with BOAC Another Forte Post House would open at Heathrow in November 1972, and the Forte Post House, with 149 beds, at the Povey's Cross junction at Gatwick Airport to open in early 1973, with a swimming pool.

The Post House chain was originally set up in 1963, at Alveston, on the A38, in south Gloucestershire, next to the 16th century Ship Inn, with 50 suites, on two floors, with the Breakspear motel in Hemel Hempstead, off the M1, the third in the chain in January 1965, costing £160,000 with 28 double rooms. In 1969 Trust Houses announced a £35m programme of new motels; it had eight motels with another to open at Plymouth in May 1970, the Mayflower. Post House was formed by Trust Houses Hotels, the UK's largest hotel group. The first overseas Post House motel was at Herstal in northern Belgium, in around 1973.

The Leicester Holiday Inn in September 2020, which opened in August 1971

Holiday Inn began construction of their first motel at Leicester from October 1969 of a 204-bed £1.4m hotel, to open in early 1971, to cost £5 for single rooms and for £7 double rooms. The site at St Nicholas Circle opened in August 1971. Holiday Inn later opened a 'Garden Court Hotel', at Warrington in July 1989, the first of 35 planned three-star hotels, with others to open in 1989 at Leamington Spa and a £4m 100-room hotel at Castle Marina in Nottingham, operated in conjunction with Bass, which opened on December 1 1989. Holiday Inn Express first opened in April 1996 in Strathclyde.

The Coventry Novotel in April 2015, which opened in May 1974

The first Novotel was built at Longford, Coventry, with 102 rooms, opening on May 15 1974, built from May 1972, on a 4-acre site, with a swimming pool, next to the M6, being opened by economic minister to the French Embassy in London. The second Novotel was in Sandiacre in Derbyshire, next to the M1, in February 1975, a three-star hotel

The first Ramada opened in the south of England on September 1 1983. In 1987 Ramada opened its third hotel, a £9m converted office block in Manchester, with 205 rooms. The planning enquiry for Heathrow Terminal 5 in 1996 was held in the Heathrow Ramada, the longest public enquiry in the UK.

The first Ibis opened at Heathrow in June 1985, a two-star hotel with 244 rooms. In January 1986 there would be five more Ibis hotels. The second Ibis, with 300 rooms and costing £9.7m, opened at Euston in September 1987. The third Ibis opened in July 1988 in Greenwich, with another being built in Manchester. Luton, Swindon and Southampton were opened by July 1990.

The first Marriott Courtyard was at Turnford, Hertfordshire near Cheshunt on December 2 1991, a budget hotel.

The first Sleep Inn, a budget motel owned by Quality Inn of the US, opened at Sandiacre in Derbyshire near the M1, in early October 1990, being 120 rooms.

Saxon Inn Motor Hotels, of Harlow in Essex, had large motels at Blackburn, Harlow, Huddersfield, Northampton and Whitley, North Yorkshire, in the 1970s. These are now owned by Mercure, or have been demolished. Other motels were Esso Motor Hotels.

=== Significant American influence ===
By the early 1980s the British hotel industry had adequate provision for tourists in London, but outside of London, any American visitors had to stay in quite modest facilities, that were not good enough for the American lavish taste. The Americans decided that the UK required a few better-equipped hotels outside of London, and built them in the late 1980s; Sheraton would build eight five-star 250-room hotels by 1989, with Holiday Inn of Tennessee and Ramada of Arizona would build five hotels costing £65m, and Marriott and Hyatt.

Few five-star hotels had been built since before the war. Ramada had eight hotels in Europe, out of 620 worldwide.

=== Companies ===
Around 1970 Grand Metropolitan merged with Express Dairies and Mecca, to form a large conglomerate, and Trust Houses merged with Forte to form THF. THF had 180 hotels in the UK in 1972, with 31 Post House motels, the most, by some distance. THF were the largest hotel operator in 1975, but Holiday Inn were catching up rapidly.

Clydesdale Commonwealth Hotels was the largest hotel group in Scotland.

In August 1981 Grand Met bought Intercontinental Hotels Group for £267m, from Pan Am, arranged by Sir Maxwell Joseph and Sir Stanley Grinstead. In August 1988 IHG was put up for sale by Grand Met. This is now IHG Hotels & Resorts.

Bass bought Holiday Inn International in 1987, and in August 1989 it bought the whole of Holiday Inn, becoming the world's largest hotel group.

There were 30,000 hotels in 1987; the largest hotelier was THF with 203. THF had begun on January 30 1903, as the Hertfordshire Public House Trust Company, with its first pub in Ridge, Hertfordshire, and the next two in Elstree and Breachwood Green. It eventually became Forte plc in May 1991. By December 1995 there were 122 Forte Travelodges, when ran by John Hampson.

By 1994 the second-largest hotel group was Mount Charlotte Thistle, with 24 hotels, including the 808-room Tower Thistle in London, formed in October 1989 when Mount Charlotte bought Thistle for £645m from Scottish & Newcastle.

Greenall Whitley, of Warrington, formed De Vere.

The UK hotel industry is worth £16bn. Travelodge has 595 hotels with 11 in Ireland, with around 12,000 employees, and in 2022 it turned over around £910m. Premier Inn has about 850 hotels, with 83,500 rooms, and a revenue of £2.5bn.

Other countries have a hotel tax, with 7.5% in Germany and 12% in the Netherlands. Novotel and Ibis are owned by Accor of France. In 1986 the first Ibis, in the UK, had opened at Heathrow Airport; there were six Novotel hotels in 1986. Dalata Hotel Group is the largest hotel operator in Ireland, and has hotels in the UK.

The UK has around 25,000 bed and breakfast establishments.

== Contract catering ==
Contract catering largely started from the 1833 Factory Act, which encouraged factories to provide canteens. Previous to this, workers mostly brought in their own food. Factory canteens increased significantly during World War I. During World War II, the numbers of factory canteens increased, notably at large Royal Ordnance Factorys.

The Local Government Act 1988 introduced Compulsory Competitive Tendering (CCT) for local services. The Local Government Act 1999 introduced Best Value, where competitive tendering for local services was no longer compulsory, but was advocated as an option, if it offered better value.

Forte sold Gardner Merchant in December 1992 for £402m; it was the UK's large contract caterer, to a management buyout funded by Cinven, the private equity company. Gardner Merchant, part of THF, was the largest contract catering management company in Europe, in 1987, serving a million meals per day.

Compass was formed in the summer of 1987, with a £160m management buyout from Grand Met. By 1988 it had 2,600 catering contracts, with Gardner Merchant having 2,700.

From August 1989, local education authorities had to allow private competition for school meals provision. Hospitals were also allowing competition. In the 1980s, ARA (Automatic Retailers of America), an American company, had won many defence catering subcontracts; it became Aramark in 1994.

== Catering equipment ==
Moorwood Vulcan were a main British manufacturer of catering equipment, such as industrial gas cookers. It ceased manufacturing in 2016, being bought in October 2008 by The Manitowoc Company of Milwaukee in Wisconsin, previously owned by Enodis. It was originally formed in 1961 from Moorwoods, of the UK, and the Vulcan-Hart Corporation of the US. Many schools and colleges had their large gas cookers, as well as most Royal Navy ships, and the Cunard QE2 ocean liner in 1969.

Lincat, of North Hykeham in Lincolnshire, are largely known for their water boilers, and also make various types of oven, and deep fryers.

Foster Refrigerator, of west Norfolk, formed in 1968, claim to be Europe's largest manufacturer of commercial refrigerators. It has been US-owned since 1999.

AGA Rangemaster Group, known for the AGA cooker, was in Shropshire until 2017. Middleby of the USA bought AGA Rangemaster in 2015.

Much catering supplies are provided by Bidfood (former 3663), of Buckinghamshire, and Brake Bros of Kent.

The Foodservice Equipment Association is near St Katharine Docks in central London, and the Catering Equipment Distributors Association is in Inkberrow, in east Worcestershire.

== Travel catering ==
=== Cabin crew ===
Most cabin crew entered at the age of 22 to 24. Until the late 1980s, it was largely exclusively a female occupation. In October 1986 Dan-Air was reprimanded by the Equal Opportunities Commission (United Kingdom) for only employing female cabin crew.

In the 1980s, Virgin Atlantic asked its cabin crew to retire at the age of 36.

BA flight attendant on a BAC One-Eleven from Manchester to Copenhagen in 1974

BA stewardesses had to wear makeup. Staff were trained in aircraft hijackings and suspicious suitcases. Staff were banned from drinking eight hours before a flight, known as 'bottle to throttle'. BA staff trained at the Cranebank centre. In 1980 there were around 6,000 BA cabin crew, who trained for two weeks, then trained for two weeks on aircraft safety and emergencies.

On June 10 1990, on British Airways Flight 5390, BA cabin steward Nigel Ogden and purser John Heward held on to the legs of Tim Lancaster, the 42 year old captain, for 15 minutes after explosive decompression. Later that year, in early August, when Iraq invaded Kuwait, an Iraqi soldier raped a BA stewardess, in front of passengers, from British Airways Flight 149. The passengers were later starved, and released in December 1990.

In 1985 BA supplied 34,000 vegetarian meals; by 1989 it was 63,000.

In 1963 BEA served around 5,000 meals per day, increasing to 8,000 to 10,000 in the summer months; the BEA Flight Catering Centre opened in March 1963, with 300 staff, including 28 chefs. BEA had 450 stewards with 450 stewardesses, who were trained for six weeks.

== Nightclubs ==
Nightclubs originated mostly from public dance halls from the 1930s, such as the Locarno Ballrooms in Glasgow in 1926, and in Streatham in 1929. These were later owned by the Mecca Leisure Group. The Hammersmith Palais opened in November 1919, which was possibly the first of its kind in the UK, being demolished in 2012. The London Astoria opened in 1927, being demolished in 2009, to make way for Crossrail. A former boss of Mecca was Eric Morley, who devised Come Dancing in 1949, and many beauty contests.

By the late 1970s, Mecca had around fifty Tiffany's nightclubs. One of the first Tiffany's Ballroom nightclubs was in Bristol in 1968, converted from a Locarno nightclub; most appeared from 1970. The BBC Come Dancing was often filmed at the Tiffany's Ballroom nightclub in Glasgow. The Miss England contests were held in these, in the 1970s. The 1974 final of Miss United Kingdom was at Blackpool, and in 1975. The British Amateur Dancing Association held contests at these too, with Princess Margaret attending one of these at Glasgow on May 24 1972. Miss Scotland was held there, on Sauchiehall Street in Glasgow. Shrewsbury opened in May 1973 Many of these would become known as Ritzy by 1982 and 1983. At this time, Mecca also owned The Ritz (Manchester), now an O2 Academy, run by Academy Music Group.

In 1987 Whitbread had 42 discotheques, under Aureon Entertainments, formed in April 1985. Some of these nightclubs ran wet T-shirt contests in the late 1980s, such as at 'Martine's' in Portsmouth and 'Rinaldo's' in Peterborough. In September 1987 Aureon Entertainments was sold to Pleasurama, owned by Robert Earl.

Chicago Rock Cafe was established by Luminar Leisure, of Dunstable in Bedfordshire, around 1990, first opening in King's Lynn, in west Norfolk, then in Luton, in October 1990.

Jumpin' Jak's was first established at Leisureworld in Hemel Hempstead in September 1995. Leisureworld claimed to be Europe's largest entertainment site. Another Leisureworld opened in Portsmouth around August 1997.

There were 4,200 nightclubs in 1994 and 4,100 by 1996. In the 1990s it was found that people in the north of England went to nightclubs more than people in the south of England.

Since 2020 the UK has lost 37% of nightclubs, over 400, or ten a month.

== Alcoholic refreshment ==
Ye Olde Fighting Cocks in Hertfordshire claims to be England's oldest pub. 289 pubs closed in 2024.

=== Licensing laws ===
The Licensing (Restaurant Meals) Act 1987 of February 1987, allowed restaurants to serve alcohol throughout the day, and until 12am. It applied to pubs that served table meals.

The Licensing Act 1988, given Royal assent on 19 May 1988, allowed pubs to open from 3pm to 5.30pm.

As Minister of State for Home Affairs, Michael Forsyth, Baron Forsyth of Drumlean introduced legislation that allowed children under-14 (which was prohibited by the former Licensing Act 1964) into pubs, and were allowed to be served food until 9pm, with half-an-hour to eat the food, and promptly leave the premises by 9.30pm. The licensing law took effect from 3 January 1995, although it was February 1995 before pubs largely changed their policies. Pubs were allowed to open on Sundays from 3pm to 7pm. The Deregulation and Contracting Out Act 1994 gained Royal assent on Thursday 3 November 1994. The act also allowed shops to open after 8pm, and for off-licences to sell alcohol on Sundays from 1 December 1994.

Under the Licensing Act 1902, pubs can set their own policies, and from 2012, due to unruly children, Wetherspoons would serve no more than two alcoholic drinks to adults who accompanied children in their pubs.

The controversial Licensing Act 2003 allowed pubs to open when they liked. The 2003 act also allowed children under-16 to work in pubs. Children's working hours are governed by the Children and Young Persons Act 1933. Section 150 of the 2003 act allowed 16 and 17 year olds to consume beer, cider or wine, but only with a meal in a pub. Spirits cannot be consumed by anyone under 18 in licensed premises. Pubs are not obliged to sell beer for 16 year olds eating a meal, and can refuse.

=== Female-friendly establishments ===
Amanda Willmott had founded two pubs in Birmingham - Carpe Diem and Quo Vadis; this design formed the template for her new design of female-friendly pubs for Bass Inns, known as All Bar One, in February 1994, which first opened in December 1994 in Sutton, London; she went on to form a similar chain Ha! Ha! Bar and Canteen, in 1998.

== Eating out ==
Raymond Postgate launched The Good Food Guide in 1951; his son later produced 'Ivor the Engine' and 'The Clangers'.

Beefeater Steak Houses were one of the first chains of restaurants, first opening in July 1974 in Enfield, London; in 1974 its most popular meal was prawn cocktail, rump steak, followed by Black Forest gateau and two glasses of Liebfraumilch German wine; by 1995 it was Britain's largest restaurant chain, with 270 outlets, serving 15 million people per year.

The former cafe at Hartside Pass at Leadgate, Cumbria claimed to be the highest cafe in England, at 575m.

922 restaurants closed in 2019, and 1188 closed in 2018.

== Food safety ==
The 1990 Food Safety Act was the biggest change since 1938. It was introduced due to rising cases in listeria in cooked chilled chicken products. It replaced the Food Act 1984. Prisons, civil service buildings and military bases would now have their kitchens inspected by local environmental health officers, which had not regularly happened before. There had been recent salmonella outbreaks in NHS hospitals. All food outlets would now have to be registered with local authorities. Environmental health officers could instantly close down restaurants, without needing to obtain a court order. Restaurant owners could be fined £20,000 and jailed for six months by local magistrates.

The Food Safety (General Food Hygiene) Regulations 1995 were introduced on 15 September 1995, which implemented the European Food Hygiene Directive 93/43/EEC.

The Food Information Regulations 2014 brought in the necessity for businesses to display the 14 allergens. This originated from the European FIC Regulation of December 2014, the Regulation (EU) No 1169/2011.

=== List of food poisoning cases ===
- August 1922, Loch Maree Hotel botulism poisoning, where six guests and two staff died in the first case of botulism in the UK, originating from the hotel's potted duck paste, investigated by the microbiologist Philip Bruce White
- Between 12-17 March 1984, British Airways had a salmonella outbreak on long-haul flights to North America, the Middle East, and East Africa, affecting 631 passengers and 135 staff on 14 flights, including the businessman Peter de Savary, giving him a week in hospital, and on Concorde flights. No flight deck staff were affected, as the pilot, co-pilot and flight engineer, by common practice, never had the same food as passengers. Prof Stanley Mohlers and Kenneth N. Beers of Wright State University Medical School in Dayton, Ohio believed that food poisoning was an untrivial risk for airline crew
- 19 January 1991, at a McDonald's restaurant on Friar Gate in Preston in Lancashire, 14 people contracted E. coli O157. This strain produced verocytotoxin, so on 15 February 1991, McDonald's announced that it would cook its burgers for longer, across the whole of the UK
- November 1996 Wishaw, North Lanarkshire, Escherichia coli O157:H7 outbreak, killed 21 people
- 2005 South Wales E. coli O157 outbreak
- December 2012, a Christmas meal at the Railway Hotel in Hornchurch made 33 people ill with Clostridium perfringens, and mother-of-one Della Callagher died two days later. She had visited the Queen's Hospital in Romford, on Boxing Day, being given an anti-sickness injection by paramedics in an ambulance, and told to go home. No blood tests had been taken. She went into cardiac arrest the following morning, with CPR given, but the London Ambulance Service took 45 minutes to arrive. The turkey meat, prepared the day before, was not cooled enough, after being cooked, and was not adequately reheated. Food safety records had not been adequately kept, so the 37-year-old pub chef and 41-year-old manager concocted records, and were jailed at Snaresbrook Court for 12 months and 18 months, in January 2015. Mitchells & Butlers were fined £1.5m in November 2014; it was an Ember Inns establishment.

== Incidents ==
- On Boxing Day 1969, an 18-bedroomed historic timbered coaching inn in Saffron Walden, in Essex, burned down, killing eleven people. The manager was 55-year-old Emil Landsman, a former wartime fighter pilot with 306 Polish Fighter Squadron, had been there for 21 months, under Trust Houses Forte. The fire led directly to the Fire Precautions Act 1971. Previous fire legislation came under the Public Health Act 1936, which quoted that local councils were to regulate the adequate provision of fire escapes in hospitality venues
- In late October 1983 at the 67-bedroom Royal Darroch Hotel, owned by Stakis Hotels, on North Deeside Road in Cults, Aberdeen, there was a gas explosion at 9am in the morning. The entire ground floor fell 12 feet into the basement. Six people died, being the worst gas explosion in Scotland since the Clarkston explosion in October 1971.

== Companies ==
=== Stonegate Pub Company ===
The Stonegate Pub Company (based close to the M1 in Luton) is the largest pub group in the UK, after it bought Ei Group in March 2020 for £3 billion.

=== Whitbread ===
Before it sold Costa Coffee in January 2019, Whitbread, in Houghton Regis in Bedfordshire, was the UK's largest hotel and restaurant group, owning Premier Inn, Brewers Fayre and Beefeater.

=== Premier Inn ===
Premier Inn was developed and expanded in the 2000s largely during the leadership of Alan C. Parker, the chief executive of Whitbread.

=== Brewers Fayre ===
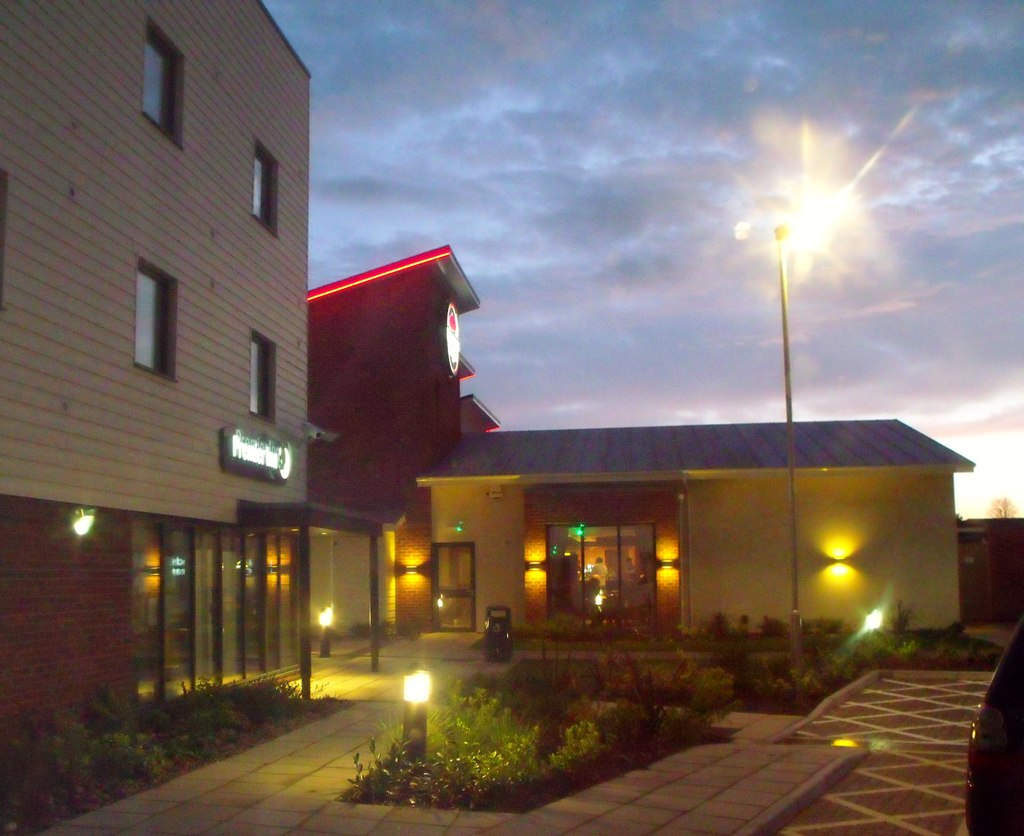
Premier Inn and Brewers Fayre in Exeter in April 2014

The first restaurant opened at Whitestake, south west of Preston in 1981. In December 1990, Whitbread bought over 150 Berni Inns from GrandMet for £115m, and converted many to Brewers Fayres.

In 1997 its 360 pubs sold 23 million meals, twice as much as its nearest competitor. In 1998 its 385 pubs sold 33 million meals.

=== Costa Coffee ===
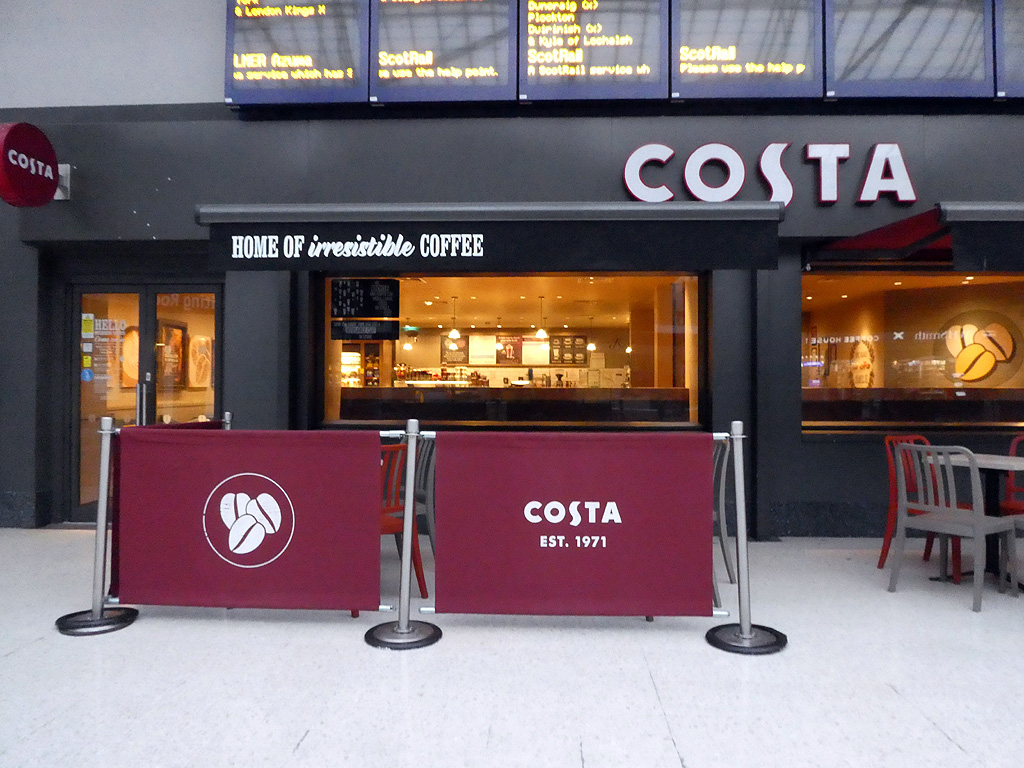
Restaurant at Inverness railway station in February 2020

There were 30 outlets in 1993. The company was bought by Whitbread in September 1995, when Costa had sales of £55m, and 41 outlets, for £23m. The company had 117 outlets by 1999. In August 2005 had 426 outlets. By June 2014, Whitbread had increased this to 2,861 outlets in 30 countries.

=== Compass Group ===
Compass Group, in Chertsey in Surrey, is the largest contract foodservice company in the world. Sodexo UK employs around 43,000 people, and Compass Group UK has 45,000.

=== Wetherspoons ===
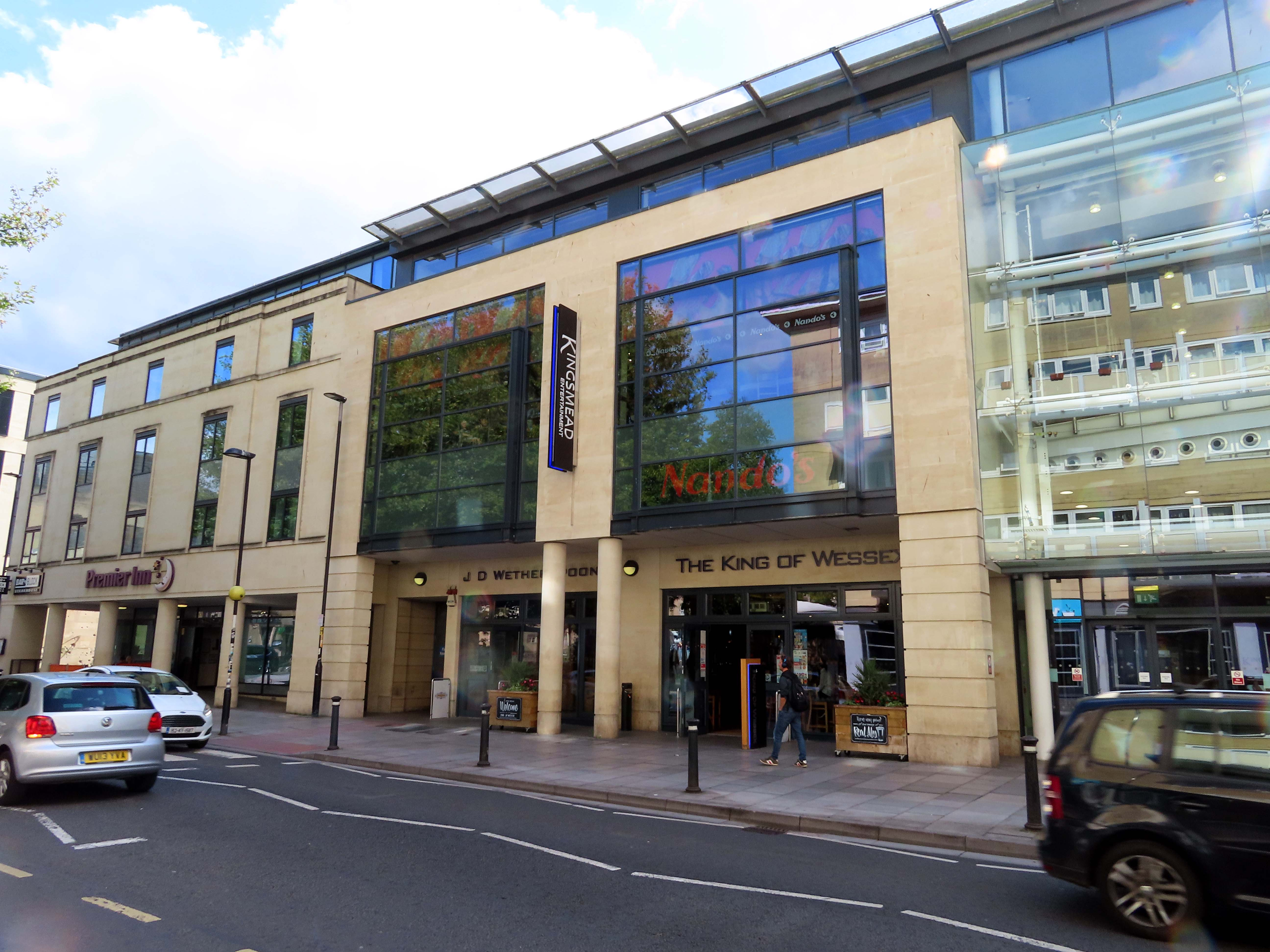
'The King of Wessex' pub in Somerset in August 2019

The first Wetherspoons opened on December 8 1979, by Tim Martin and Andrew Marler. In the 1980s the company was headquartered in Finchley, and the company listed on the stock exchange in October 1992, when the company had 44 pubs in London. In 1993 it opened its first pub outside of London, in Norwich. The Marquee Club in London was bought in 1996.

Scottish and Newcastle attempted to copy the format, with its John Barras pub chain, and Bass likewise introduced its Goose and Granite chain, in an attempt to compete for the same customers.

On August 4 1997 it banned alcopops at its 194 pubs. The outlets are intended to be real ale pubs without music. It started breakfast opening in September 2002, when it moved the opening time to 10am.

=== McDonald's ===
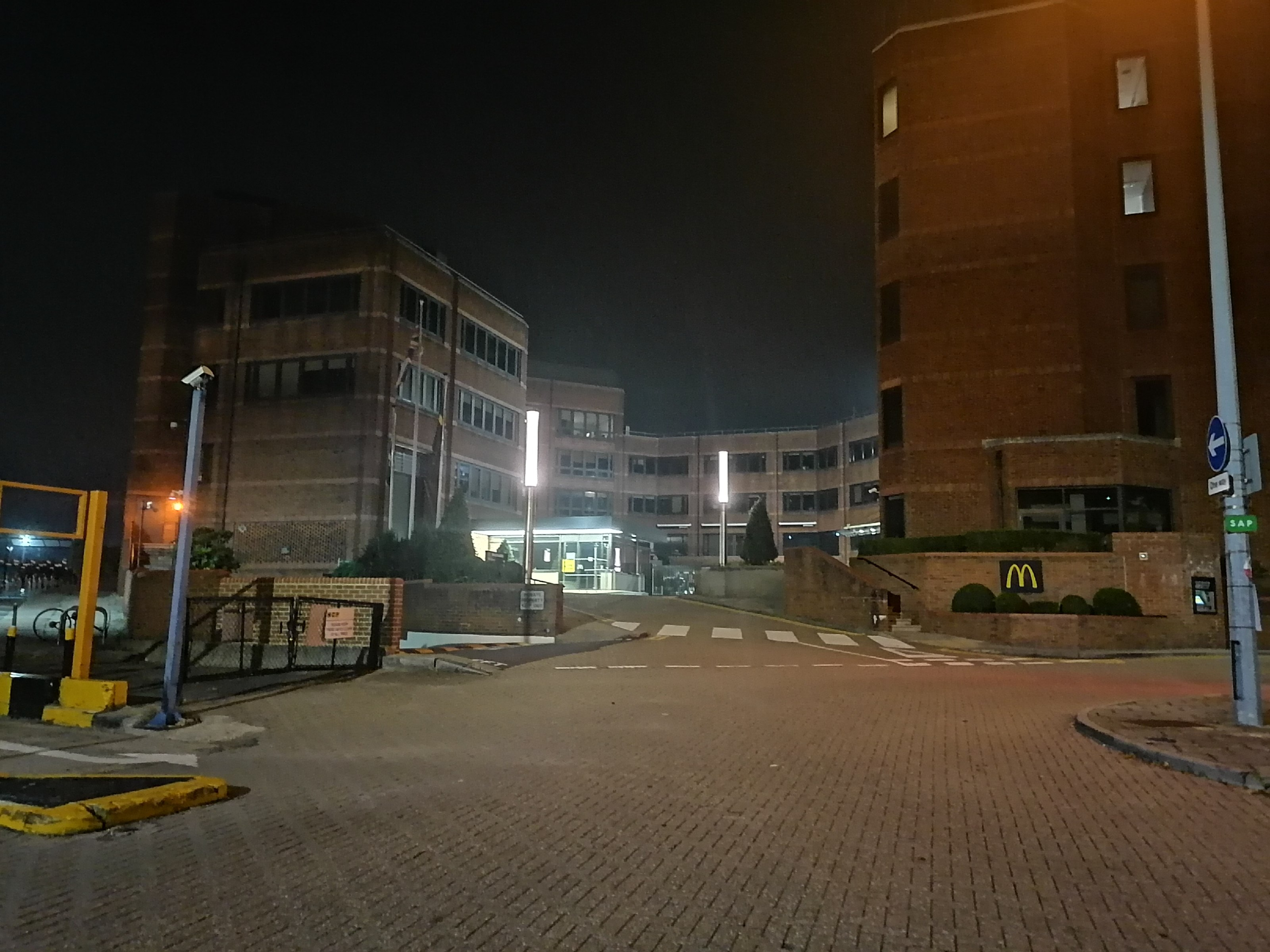
Since 1982 the McDonald's UK headquarters are north of East Finchley tube station, being officially opened by Mrs Thatcher on 6 May 1983, when she was the local MP, and she also opened the £20m extension on 21 April 1989

McDonald's arrived in the UK on Powis Street in Woolwich on 1 October 1974, the 3,000th restaurant in the company's history; in December 1971 a McDonald's had opened in Obergiesing in southern Germany. Fred L. Turner attended the opening. Seven other restaurants followed in London, from January 1975 with Golders Green, Baker Street and Finchley Road. A cheeseburger was 21p, and a Big Mac 45p; the Big Mac had been introduced in 1968. The restaurant was not, apparently, well-visited, so the company chose to heavily-advertise its products at less-discerning children.

The first restaurant in Wales opened in December 1984, in Cardiff; the first in Scotland was in November 1987 on Reform Street in Dundee, with another in Inverness opening soon after; the first in Edinburgh opened in August 1988, with two in Glasgow at the same time; the first in Northern Ireland opened on October 14 1991, at Bradbury Place in Belfast, being the 400th McDonald's restaurant in the UK, with over 8,000 customers on the first day, and the restaurant did not have enough Big Macs; Linden Foods of Dungannon supplied the burgers.

It opened its first site at a British hospital on December 14 1992, at Guy's Hospital, a 115-seat restaurant, costing £750,000.

In 1990 meat products were made in Milton Keynes, built in 1980, and Scunthorpe, built in 1989, with fruit pies made in the north of Huntingdon and doughnuts in Orton Southgate, owned by OSI Group, and salads made on the former RAF Methwold in south-west Norfolk (closed in 2006), and chicken products made by Avara Foods (run with Faccenda Foods) in Hereford.

McDonald's opened in France in 1972, being their most profitable operation outside of the US, where customers spend more per head than anywhere else, in large groups, often eating dessert, and 70% eat in, than take out, with over 1,400 branches.

=== Burger King ===
Burger King arrived on 11 October 1977 on Coventry Street in London. The second opened on 4 September 1979 on Victoria Street. The first Burger King outside of London opened in December 1980 at the Arndale Centre in Luton, now called Luton Point. The third in the UK opened on 2 February 1981 on Queensway, London. The British restaurants were directly owned by Pillsbury. By May 1983, it had nine British restaurants; McDonald's had 130, and KFC had 350.

=== KFC ===
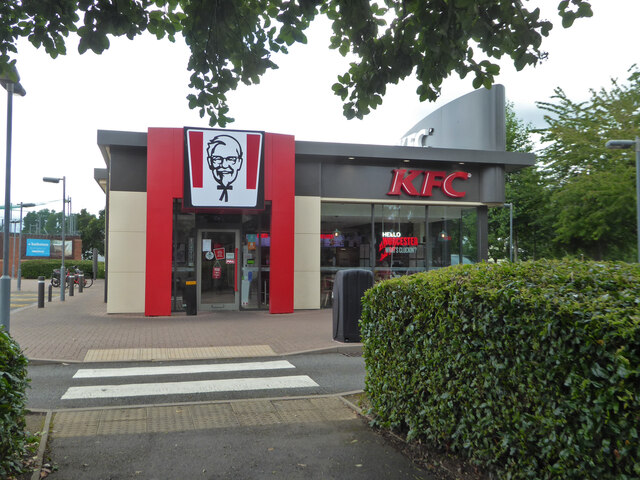
KFC restaurant at Blackpole retail park, west of Warndon in the north of Worcester in July 2021

The first KFC in the UK opened in Preston in August 1965, which was the first KFC restaurant outside of the US. Another opened soon after at 78 County Road, in Walton, Liverpool.

Many of these new outlets were largely franchises, which operated in ways of restrictive trade that could contravene the Restrictive Trade Practices Act 1956, and be investigated by the Office of Fair Trading. David Acheson was head of KFC in the late 1970s. In 1971 KFC had been bought by Heublein, who owned Smirnoff vodka.

The first KFC in London was on High Road in North Finchley, in November 1968. By the end of 1972, there were 162 in the UK, with 90 in London. The first drive-through KFC was in 1984, at Stacey Bushes in Milton Keynes. By 1997 KFC had 380 restaurants.

=== Pizza Hut ===
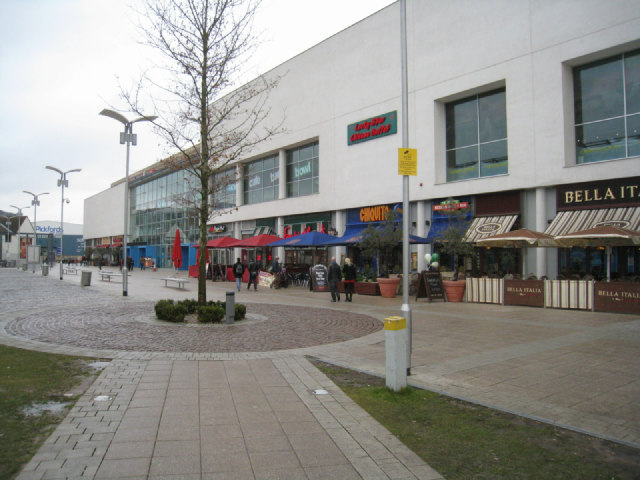
Pizza Hut at Cambridge Leisure Park on Hills Road, Cambridge in February 2010

Pizza Hut came to the UK in Islington in 1973, being owned jointly by PepsiCo and Whitbread.

By October 1983 it had 28 restaurants. By 1984 there were 56 restaurants, and 80 by 1986. Pizza Hut began the delivery service in May 1991.

The first Pizza Hut in Scotland was in July 1986, on Hanover Street, in Edinburgh; the first in Wales was in April 1986, in Swansea and Cardiff, the 76th Pizza Hut restaurant in the UK; and the first in Northern Ireland was on October 10 1991, in Carryduff, County Down.

Whitbread by the early 1990s would be opening Pizza Hut restaurants in France, Belgium and the Netherlands. GIB Group, of Belgium, would have 50% of the Belgian and Dutch restaurants. By 1992 there were 19 restaurants in Belgium, and one in the Netherlands. In September 1992, Whitbread sold its European restaurants to Pizza Hut International.

=== Chef & Brewer ===
This had been operating from the mid-1920s. By the mid-1940s, there were 44 Chef & Brewer establishments in London. It was bought by Grand Metropolitan in July 1966. Under Grand Met, it was the large group of retail pubs in the UK in the 1980s.

=== Zizzi ===
Founded in West London in 1999, as part of the ASK Italian group.

=== TGI Fridays ===
Originally from Texas, Whitbread opened the first 240-seat restaurant on Hagley Road in Edgbaston in late March 1986, followed by a 250-seat restaurant on the Strand. It was headquartered in Milton Keynes. But the Edgbaston site lost its drinks licence in April 1988, after trading standards officers found that customers were being sold short. The licence was reinstated in July 1988. In 1989 the Hagley Road site was trading £65,000 to £70,000 per week.

=== Flaming Grill ===
The first establishment was the Drawbridge Inn in April 2010 in the West Midlands. It was formed by Spirit Pubs, now Greene King.

=== Wagamama ===
The first site opened on Streatham Street in Bloomsbury on April 22 1992.

=== Frankie & Benny's ===
The first establishment opened in October 1995, by City Centre Restaurants, at the Meridian Leisure Park in Thorpe Astley, in the Blaby District of Leicestershire. Sutton Coldfield followed soon after. Many were converted Deep Pan Pizza restaurants, which CCR owned. The sites were often built on out-of-town large leisure parks. There were 36 restaurants by 1999.

=== Bella Pasta ===
Also known as Bella Italia. The first establishment opened in Bristol in September 1991, and in Manchester in October 1991. In 1991 Michael Guthrie, formerly of Mecca Group, bought Pizzaland from GrandMet, to form the BrightReasons Group of Uxbridge, which founded Bella Pasta. In November 1996 BrightReasons owned 20 Pizza Piazza outlets, 54 Bella Pasta outlets, and 104 Pizzaland outlets. In late November, Whitbread bought BrightReasons for around £45m. In 1997, Whitbread converted over 40 Pizzaland restaurants into Bella Pasta. Whitbread wanted to increase the 55 Bella Pasta restaurants to over 200.

=== Pizza Express ===
In February 1996 Pizza Express had 98 branches, when David Page took over as chief executive, who wanted to treble the number of restaurants. By September 1997 there were 144 restaurants, when selling 10 million pizzas per year. David Page became executive chairman in December 1997. In 1999 it grew from 183 to 220 restaurants, and 256 restaurants by 2001.

=== Prezzo ===
It was founded in London in November 2000.

=== ASK Italian ===
It was founded in 1993 in Belsize Park, north London, later headquartered in Hertfordshire.

== Former companies ==
=== Allied-Domecq ===
Allied-Lyons bought Firkin Brewery in 1991, which became one of the premier and distinctive pub chains in the late 1990s, when Allied-Domecq, but was sold to Punch Taverns in 1999, who sold 110 of these sites to Bass; many became Scream Pubs.

Allied-Lyons bought Baskin-Robbins in the early 1970s, and bought Dunkin' Donuts and Mister Donut in 1990. Allied Domecq was formed in 1994, and the restaurant operations became Allied Domecq Quick Service Restaurants, which in 2004 became known as Dunkin' Brands. Pernod Ricard bought Allied Domecq in July 2005, and sold the restaurant division to private equity in December 2005. Diageo had bought many of the drinks divisions.

=== Roast Inn ===
These were carvery restaurants, which started around 1981, ownedby Whitbread, at the 'Fisher's Pond' at Colden Common. There were around 20 by 1984. By 1987 Whitbread had 40 Roast Inns, with 187 Beefeater restaurants. Sold to Devenish Brewery. Former sites became individual gastropubs, sold to Greene King or Mitchell's & Butler's Sizzling Pubs and Vintage Inns. Martin Grant, of Coventry, was managing director in the 1980s.

Punch opened their own Roast Inns subsidiary in early October 2009, the first being at junction 1 of the M18 at Bramley, Rotherham, the 'Sir Jack'.

=== Porterhouse ===
Steakhouses owned by Allied-Lyons from February 1988. It took over the Steakhouse chain, owned by Ansells, who had formed Allied in 1961.

=== Fayre & Square ===
Formed by Spirit Pubs, and converted by Greene King from April 2018 into Eating Inns.

=== Hungry Fisherman ===
Owned by Whitbread in the 1980s.

== Workforce ==
In 2015 the UK hospitality industry employed around 2.9m people – around 9% of the UK workforce. By employment, it is the UK's fourth-largest industry. The most jobs in the industry are found in London (around 500,000) and South East England (around 400,000); 18% of workers in the UK industry are in London. There are around 1.5m restaurant workers, and around 0.5m work in hotels.

The Food Safety Act 1990 introduced the training that staff have to follow.

=== Contingent of EU employees ===
Around 25% of the hospitality workforce comes from the EU, making up around 25% of chefs and around 75% of waiting staff.

In 2019, 1 in 50 applicants to Pret a Manger was British.

== See also ==
- List of hotels in the United Kingdom
- List of motorway service areas in the United Kingdom
- List of pubs in the United Kingdom
- List of restaurants in London
- List of restaurants in Scotland
- List of restaurants in Wales
