= Edward Sang =

Scottish mathematician and civil engineer

Edward Sang FRSSA FRSE
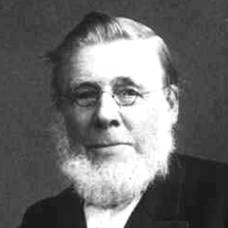
- Born: 30 January 1805; Kirkcaldy, Scotland
- Died: 23 December 1890 (aged 85); Edinburgh, Scotland
- Resting place: Newington Cemetery
- Education: University of Edinburgh
- Known for: tables of logarithms, calculations on the earth's rotation
- Spouse: Isabella Elmslie (b. 1804)
- Children: 4 daughters, 1 son
- Awards: FRSSA (1828); FRSE (1836); Makdougall Brisbane Prize (1882-84)
- Scientific career
- Notable students: David Cousin

Edward Sang FRSE FRSSA LLD (30 January 1805 – 23 December 1890) was a Scottish mathematician and civil engineer, best known for having computed large tables of logarithms, with the help of two of his daughters. These tables went beyond the tables of Henry Briggs, Adriaan Vlacq, and Gaspard de Prony.

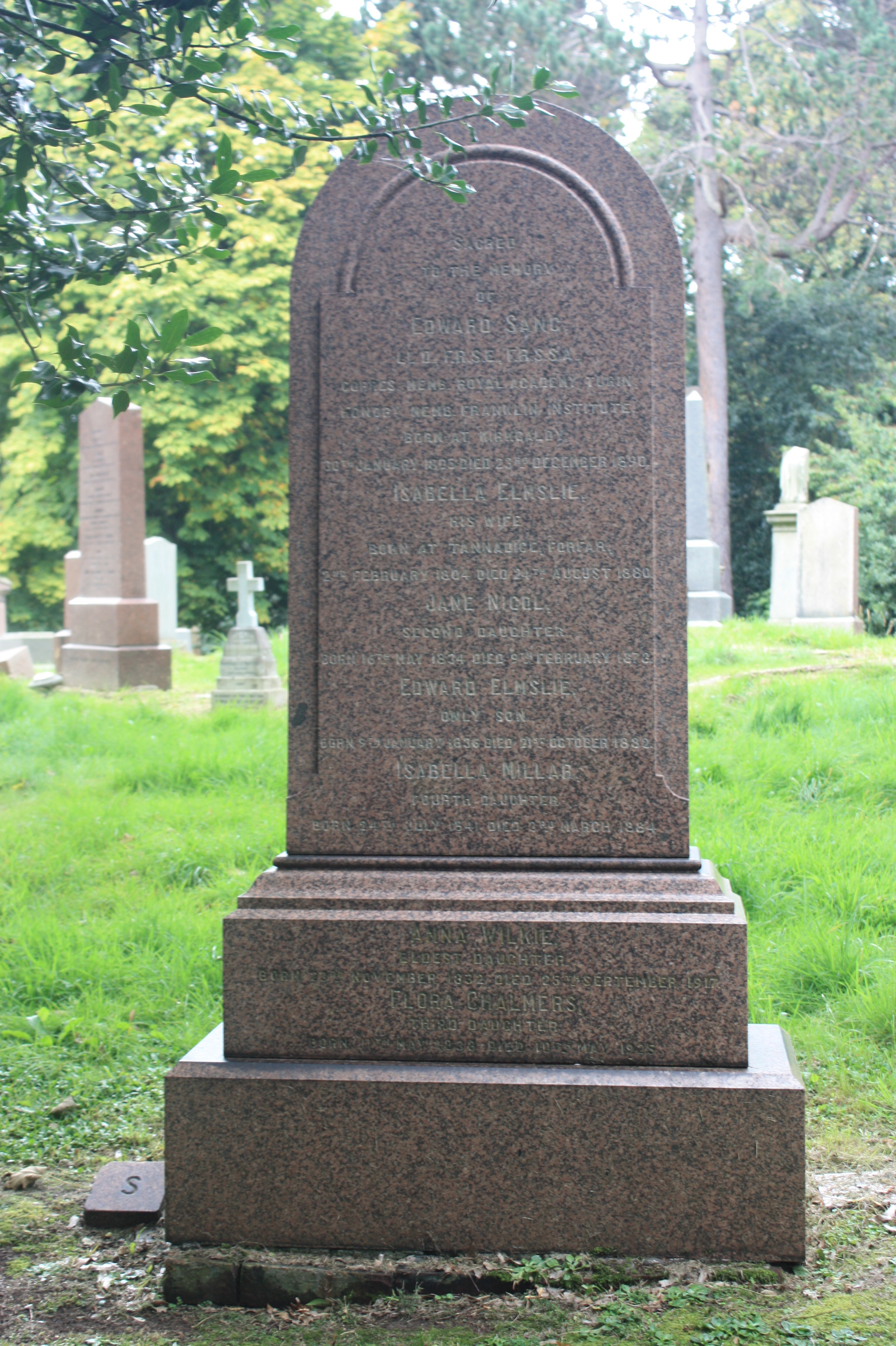
The grave of Edward Sang, Newington Cemetery

== Personal life ==
Sang was born in Kirkcaldy on 30 January 1805, the son of Jean Nicol and Edward Sang, Provost of Kirkcaldy. He attended the Subscription School in Kirkcaldy and from there went on to study at the University of Edinburgh.

In the 1830s he is listed as a teacher of mathematics living at 32 St Andrew Square in Edinburgh.

He was elected a Fellow of the Royal Society of Edinburgh in May 1836. In 1884 he was awarded their Makdougall-Brisbane Prize. He served as their Vice President 1883 to 1885.

In 1841 he took the role of Professor of Mechanical Science at Manchester New College. In 1854 he briefly served as Professor of Mechanical Science in Constantinople. He returned to Edinburgh in 1854 to again teach mathematics.

He was elected a Fellow of the Royal Scottish Society of the Arts in 1828, and was its president from 1857 to 1858.

In 1884 he was elected an Honorary Fellow of the Franklin Institute in Philadelphia.

Sang died at his home, 31 Mayfield Road, Edinburgh Newington on 23 December 1890.

== Grave ==
He is buried with his wife and children in Newington Cemetery, Edinburgh. The grave can be found when entering from Dalkeith Road, near the cemetery lodge, and then going straight for about 50 meters until meeting a circular plot of graves. Sang's grave is slightly towards the left, on the second circle from the outside. The inscription on the tombplate is

Sacred
to the memory
of
Edward Sang,
LL.D., F.R.S.E., F.R.S.S.A.,
corres. memb. royal academy, Turin,
honor. memb. Franklin Institute,
born at Kirkcaldy
30 January 1805 died 23 December 1890
Isabella Elmslie
his wife
born at Tannadice, Forfar
2 February 1804 died 24 August 1880
Jane Nicol
second daughter
born 16 May 1834 died 9 February 1878
Edward Elmslie
only son
born 9 January 1836 died 31 October 1882
Isabella Millar
Fourth daughter
born 24 July 1841 died 3 March 1884
Anna Wilkie,
Eldest daughter
born 23 November 1832 died 25 September 1917
Flora Chalmers
Third daughter
born 11 May 1838 died 10 May 1925.

(Elmslie, Nicol, Millar, Wilkie and Chalmers are middle names taken from ancestors' surnames.)

== Family ==
Edward Sang was married to Isabella Elmslie (2 February 1804, Tannadice, Forfar – 24 August 1880) and they had five children:

- Anna Wilkie (23 November 1832 – 25 September 1917)
- Jane Nicol (16 May 1834 – 9 February 1878)
- Edward Elmslie (9 January 1836 – 31 October 1882)
- Flora Chalmers (11 May 1838 – 10 May 1925)
- Isabella Millar (24 July 1841 – 3 March 1884)

None of the children married.

The engineer John Sang (1809-1887) was a brother of Edward Sang. In 1851, he invented a planimeter which he called "platometer."

== Mathematical work ==
=== Demonstrating the rotation of the Earth ===
In 1836, Sang explained how a spinning top could be used to demonstrate the rotation of the Earth, anticipating Foucault's pendulum. (see Johann G. Hagen: La rotation de la terre, ses preuves mécaniques anciennes et nouvelles, 1911)

=== Trigonometric and logarithmic tables ===
Sang worked for many years on trigonometric and logarithmic tables. Summaries of his tables were published by Alex Craik.

Sang's 1871 table and his project for a 9-place million table were (re)constructed as part of the LOCOMAT project.

=== Various other works ===
- Edward Sang's logarithmic method for constructing a skew arch.

== Publications ==
The following list is certainly still incomplete. Some page ranges may be slightly incorrect. Note that Pebble's list of publications contains more items, but some of them seem spurious, and others are not actual publications. Nevertheless, the present list is very likely incomplete.

Communications are marked with "(communication)" and are reviews or summaries of communicated papers. There are many more than those mentioned in the subsequent list.

=== 1829–1834 ===
- Edward Sang, Solution of algebraic equations, of all orders, whether involving one or more unknown quantities, Edinburgh, 1829
  - Review in The New Scots magazine, volume 2, issue 10, 31 August 1829, p. 143 link
- Sang, Edward (1829), "On a property possessed in common by the primitives and derivatives of the product of two monome functions", Philosophical Magazine, 6: 262–267
- Sang, Edward (1830), "Observations on the theory of capillary action given in the supplement to the Encyclopædia Britannica", The Edinburgh New Philosophical Journal, 8: 280–283
- Sang, Edward (1831), "On the adaptation of the fly-wheel and pulley to the turning-lathe to a given length of band", The Edinburgh New Philosophical Journal, 10: 239–250
- John Dunn and Edward Sang, An account of some experiments made to determine the thermal expansion of marble
  - The Edinburgh New Philosophical Journal, 1831, 66–71
  - The Horological Journal, volume 6, 1864, 116–119
- Edward Sang, Analysis of the vibration of wires, The Edinburgh New Philosophical Journal, volume 12, 1832, 308–319
- Edward Sang, A new solution of that case of spherical trigonometry, in which it is proposed, from two sides and their contained angle, to determine the third side, The Edinburgh New Philosophical Journal, volume 14, 1833, 311–314
- Edward Sang, On the advantages of a short arc of vibration for the clock pendulum
  - The Edinburgh New Philosophical Journal, volume 15, 1833, 137–141
  - Transactions of the Royal Scottish Society of Arts, volume 1, 1841, 14–19 (reprinted from 1833 above)
- Edward Sang, A few remarks on the relation which subsists between a Machine and its Model:
  - The Edinburgh New Philosophical Journal, volume 14, 1833, 145–155
  - The American Journal of science and arts, volume 24, number 2, 1833, 264–272
  - Mechanics' Magazine, June 1833, 302–304, November 1833, 145–148, January 1834, 228–229 link to article
  - Transactions of the Royal Scottish Society of Arts, volume 1, 1841, 1–11 (reprinted from 1833 above)
  - American railroad journal, and advocate of internal improvements, 1833, pp. 422–423 link (partial)
- (communication) Edward Sang, Remarks on some prevailing misconceptions concerning the actions of machines, The Edinburgh New Philosophical Journal, volume 14, 1833, 402 link
- Edward Sang, 1. Meteorological observations made at Edinburgh during the great Solar Eclipse of July 17, 1833. 2. A method of freeing the determination of the latitude of an observatory, and of the declination of a star, from the consideration of atmospheric refraction, The Edinburgh New Philosophical Journal, volume 15, 1833 link
- The Phenakistiscope or Magic Disc, published by Forrester & Nichol of Edinburgh, 1833, with several mechanical animations designed by Sang (see http://www.stephenherbert.co.uk/phenakPartTwo.htm)
- Edward Sang, First essay, preliminary to the series of reports on the progress of the useful arts, ordered by the Society of Arts for Scotland
  - The Edinburgh New Philosophical Journal, volume 17, 1834, 321–330 link
  - Mechanics' Magazine, 13 December 1834, 178–182 link
  - Transactions of the Royal Scottish Society of Arts, volume 1, 1841, 19–28
- Edward Sang, Second essay, preliminary to the series of reports on the progress of the useful arts, ordered by the Society of Arts for Scotland
  - The Edinburgh New Philosophical Journal, volume 18, 1835, 167–174 link
  - Transactions of the Royal Scottish Society of Arts, volume 1, 1841, 28–36

=== 1835–1839 ===
- Edward Sang, First report regarding new inventions and improvements in the useful arts throughout Scotland, being a report on the recent improvements in the carpet manufacture
  - The Edinburgh New Philosophical Journal, volume 19, October 1835, 254–260 link
  - The repertory of patent inventions, volume 23, number 4, 1835, 298–305 link
  - Mechanics' Magazine, volume 7, January 1836, 83–87 link
  - Transactions of the Royal Scottish Society of Arts, volume 1, 1841, 65–72
  - summary in The Architectural Magazine, volume 2, September 1835, 551–552 link
  - summary in Arcana of science and art, 1836, 7–9 link
- Edward Sang, On the manner in which friction affects the motions of time-keepers, The Edinburgh New Philosophical Journal, volume 19, 1835, 129–142 link
- (communication) Edward Sang, On the construction of oblique arches, The Edinburgh New Philosophical Journal, volume 20, 1836, 421 link
- Edward Sang, Observations made with Leslie's photometer during the annular eclipse, The Edinburgh New Philosophical Journal, volume 21, 1836, 134–135 link
- Edward Sang, Suggestion of a new experiment whereby the rotation of the Earth may be demonstrated, The Edinburgh New Philosophical Journal, volume 21, 1836, 164 link
  - see also The Edinburgh New Philosophical Journal, volume 22, 1837, 210 link
- Edward Sang, Account of an improvement in the construction of Wollaston's goniometer
  - The Edinburgh New Philosophical Journal, volume 22, 1837, 213–219, link
  - Transactions of the Royal Scottish Society of Arts, volume 1, 1841, 106–111 (reprinted from 1837 above)
- Edward Sang, Annual report on the state of the useful arts, ordered by the Society of Arts for scotland: On the progress of exactitude in the manufacture of machines, The Edinburgh New Philosophical Journal, volume 23, 1837, 262–274, 263–268 (the page numbers are incorrectly printed and are given in the sequence 262 to 271, 227, 273, 274, 263 to 268, hence a total of 19 pages) link
  - mentioned in The Edinburgh New Philosophical Journal, volume 24, 216 link
- Edward Sang, Memoir on the life and writings of John West, in John West, Mathematical treatises, Edinburgh, 1838 link
- (communication) Edward Sang, Notice of the theoretical power of Barker's mill, The Edinburgh New Philosophical Journal, volume 24, 1838, 212 link (preceded by an exhibition of a steam boat model)
- (communication) Edward Sang, Essay on the construction, power, and advantages of Hiero's steam-engine, The Edinburgh New Philosophical Journal, volume 24, 1838, 213 link
- (communication) Edward Sang, Essay on the forms of the teeth of wheels. Part I. Wheels with the axes parallel to each other, The Edinburgh New Philosophical Journal, volume 24, 1838, 217 link
- Edward Sang, Notice of observations made on the rapidity of motion, and on the duration of the stoppages on the Liverpool and Manchester railway, The Edinburgh New Philosophical Journal, volume 24, 1838, 384–387 link
  - also mentioned in The Edinburgh New Philosophical Journal, volume 24, 1838, 211 link
- Edward Sang, Remarks on some prevailing misconceptions concerning the actions of machines:
  - The Edinburgh New Philosophical Journal, volume 25, 1838, 70–80 link
  - Mechanics' magazine, 1839, 57–61, link
  - Transactions of the Royal Scottish Society of Arts, volume 1, 1841, 215–224 (reprinted from 1839 above)
- Edward Sang, Notice of a dioptric light erected at Kirkcaldy Harbour. With a description of the apparatus for cutting the annular lens to the true optical figure
  - Edinburgh New Philosophical Journal (N.S.) 25, 1838, 249–254, link.
  - Transactions of the Royal Scottish Society of Arts, volume 1, 1841, 242–246 (reprinted from 1838 above)
- Edward Sang, Notice of an erroneous method of using the theodolite
  - Edinburgh New Philosophical Journal, volume 26, 1839, 173–182, link
  - Transactions of the Royal Scottish Society of Arts, volume 1, 1841, 264–273 link (reprinted from 1839 above)
- Edward Sang, On a method of obtaining the greatest possible degree of exactitude from the data of a survey
  - Edinburgh New Philosophical Journal, volume 26, 1839, 327–344 link
  - Transactions of the Royal Scottish Society of Arts, volume 1, 1841, 287–304 link (reprinted from 1839 above)
- Edward Sang, On the rapidity of motion in railway cars which is consistent with safety, The American Journal of science and arts, volume 35, 1839, 197–198 link

=== 1840–1849 ===
- Edward Sang, Essays on life assurance, Edinburgh: W.F. Watson, 1840, 61 pages (copies at Edinburgh University Library and at the library of Institute of Actuaries)
- Edward Sang, Abridgment of an essay on the construction of oblique arches, Edinburgh New Philosophical Journal, volume 28, 301–318, 1840, link
  - Edward Sang, An essay on the construction of oblique arches, The civil engineer and architect's journal, scientific and railway gazette, volume 3, 1840, 232–236 link (abridged from the Edinburgh New Philosophical Journal)
  - Edward Sang, Abridgment of an essay on the construction of oblique arches, Transactions of the Royal Scottish Society of Arts, volume 1, 1841, 420–437 link (reprinted from 1840 above)
- Edward Sang, On the construction of circular towers
  - Edinburgh New Philosophical Journal, volume 29, 1840, 245–258 link
  - Transactions of the Royal Scottish Society of Arts, volume 1, 1841, 476–489 link
- Edward Sang, On the effects of the curvature of railways
  - Edinburgh New Philosophical Journal, volume 29, 1840, 334–336 link
  - Transactions of the Royal Scottish Society of Arts, volume 1, 1841, 489–492 link (reprinted from 1840 above)
  - The American Repertory of arts, sciences, and manufactures, volume 2, 1840, 290–292, link
- Edward Sang, Tables of life assurance and annuities: Carlisle bills three percent, Edinburgh, 1840 (copy at the library of Institute of Actuaries)
- Edward Sang, Life assurance and annuity tables: with copious collection of rules and examples, Edinburgh, 1841 (volume 1) (see here for a description of the content) (copy at the library of Institute of Actuaries) (the second volume was published in 1859)
- Edward Sang, Report on the funds belonging to the corporation of tailors in Edinburgh, 1841, 20 pages (copy at the library of Institute of Actuaries)
- Edward Sang, On an erroneous deduction drawn by the late Capt. H. Kater from his experiment on the flexure of thin bars, The Edinburgh New Philosophical Journal, volume 30, 1841, 321–325 link
- Edward Sang, On the proper form for a convertible pendulum
  - The Edinburgh New Philosophical Journal, volume 31, 1841, 34–38 link
  - Transactions of the Royal Scottish Society of Arts, volume 2, 1844, 103–107, link (reprinted from 1841)
- Edward Sang, Annual report on the state of the useful arts, Transactions of the Royal Scottish Society of Arts, volume 1, 1841, 154–171
- Edward Sang, Essays on life insurance, Transactions of the Royal Scottish Society of Arts, volume 1, 1841, 339–397 (a detailed review appeared in The Assurance Magazine, and Journal of the Institute of Actuaries, volume 3, number 3, 1853, pp. 260–264)
- Edward Sang, Remarks on the influence of selection on the values of life annuities, 1842 (perhaps not published, see manuscripts section)
- Edward Sang, On a method of registering the force actually transmitted through a driving belt
  - The Edinburgh New Philosophical Journal, volume 34, 1843, 261–263 link
  - Journal of The Franklin Institute, third series, volume 5, 1843, 358–359 link

[Between 1843 and 1854, Sang was in Turkey, certainly explaining the almost total absence of publications in that period. There are possibly articles or books in Turkish.]

- Around 1847, Sang predicted the solar eclipse that took place on 9 October 1847 and which was visible in Turkey. There is supposedly an article by Sang in one of Constantinople's journals, see Charles MacFarlane, Turkey and Its Destiny, 1850, p. 246 link

=== 1850–1859 ===
- Edward Sang, Essays on life assurance, Edinburgh, 1852, link
- Edward Sang, A new general theory of the teeth of wheel, 1852, link
  - Review in The Practical mechanic's journal, volume 5, April 1852-March 1853, p. 210 link
- Edward Sang, Account of Observations on the Solar Eclipse of July 28, 1851, made at Sebastople:
  - Edinburgh New Philosophical Journal, volume 52, 103–111, 1852, link
  - Transactions of the Royal Scottish Society of Arts, volume 4, 1856, 61–68, link
- Edward Sang, Note on the method of computing the Moon's parallax, Monthly Notices of the Royal Astronomical Society, volume 15, 1854–55, pp. 168–170 link
- Edward Sang, Elementary arithmetic, Edinburgh, 1856 link
- Edward Sang, Remarks on the gyroscope in relation to his "Suggestion of a new experiment which would demonstrate the rotation of the Earth.", Transactions of the Royal Scottish Society of Arts, volume 4, 1856, 413–420 link
  - comment in Transactions of the Royal Scottish Society of Arts, Volume 4, pp. 255–256 link
- (communication) Edward Sang, Theory of free vibrations of a linear series of elastic bodies. Part 1., Proceedings of the Royal Society of Edinburgh, volume 3, 1856–1857, p. 358 link, part 2, pp. 360–362 link
- (communication) Edward Sang, Proposal of experiments to determine the molecular changes which take place on glass, 1856
- Edward Sang, Theory of linear vibrations, Edinburgh New Philosophical Journal, volume 6 (new series), 1857, 259–267 link, volume 7 (new series), 237–252 link, volume 8 (new series), 1858, 41–50 link, 193–203 link, volume 9 (new series), 1859, 82–102 link
  - part VI mentioned in The Edinburgh New Philosophical Journal, Volume 6, 1857, 163 link and in the Proceedings of the Royal Society of Edinburgh, volume 3, 1856–1857, 507–508 link
  - all articles gathered in Edward Sang, Theory of linear vibrations, Edinburgh, 1859 link
- Edward Sang, The higher arithmetic, Edinburgh, 1857 link
- Edward Sang, Short verbal notice of a simple and direct method of computing the logarithm of a number, Proceedings of the Royal Society of Edinburgh, volume 2, 1857, 451
  - mentioned in The Edinburgh New Philosophical Journal, Volume 6 (new series), 1857, 152 link
- Edward Sang, On an inaccuracy (having its greatest value about 1") in the usual method of computing the Moon's parallax, Proceedings of the Royal Society of Edinburgh, volume 3, 1857, 292–293 link
- Edward Sang, On the accuracy attainable by means of multiplied observations, Proceedings of the Royal Society of Edinburgh, volume 3, 1857, 319–324 link
- (communication) Edward Sang, Geometry a science purely experimental, Proceedings of the Royal Society of Edinburgh, volume 3, 1857, 341–343 link
- (communication) Edward Sang, On the Turkish weights and measures, Proceedings of the Royal Society of Edinburgh, volume 3, 1857, 349 link
- Edward Sang, Constantinople, Encyclopædia Britannica, 8th edition, volume VII, 1858
- Edward Sang, Pendulum, Encyclopædia Britannica, 8th edition, volume XVII, 1858
- Edward Sang, Perspective, Encyclopædia Britannica, 8th edition, volume XVII, 1858
- Edward Sang, Trigonometry, Encyclopædia Britannica, 8th edition, volume XXI, 1858
- (communication) Edward Sang, On the facets and corners of flat-faced solids, Edinburgh New Philosophical Journal, volume 8 (new series), 1858, 147 link
  - also in Proceedings of the Royal Society of Edinburgh, Volume 4, 98–99 link
  - mentioned in the Proceedings of the Royal Society of Edinburgh, volume 4, 1862, 98 link
- (communication) Edward Sang, On the exhibition of both roots of a quadratic equation by one series of converging functions, Edinburgh New Philosophical Journal, volume 7 (new series), 1858, 306 link
- Edward Sang, Five Place Logarithms, Edinburgh, 1859
- Edward Sang, Life assurance and annuity tables: with copious collection of rules and examples, London, 1859 (volume 2) (copy at the library of Institute of Actuaries) (first volume published in 1841)
- Edward Sang, Report regarding the drainage of the meadows, to the streets and buildings, &c. Committee of Magistrates and Council of the City of Edinburgh, 23 February 1859, 7 pages (copy at the National Library of Scotland) (or is this by Edward Sang's son?)
- Edward Sang, A new tonnage ready reckoner, St Andrews, 1859 (copy at the National Library of Scotland)

=== 1860–1864 ===
- Edward Sang, Appearance of the Sun during the eclipse of July 18, 1860, as it will be seen from London, 1860
- Edward Sang, On the deflection of the plummet due to solar and lunar attraction, 1862 (Transactions of the Royal Society of Edinburgh, volume 23, part 1) 89–94 link
  - Proceedings of the Royal Society of Edinburgh, volume 4, 1862, 604 link
- Edward Sang, On the exhibition of both roots of a quadratic equation by one series of converging functions, Proceedings of the Royal Society of Edinburgh, volume 4, 1862, 70–72 link
- Edward Sang, Notice of certain remarkable laws connected with the oscillations of flexible pendulums, Proceedings of the Royal Society of Edinburgh, volume 4, 1862, 255–257 link
- (communication) Edward Sang, On the utmost horizontal distance which can be spanned by a chain of a given material, Proceedings of the Royal Society of Edinburgh, volume 4, 1862, 292–293 link
- Edward Sang, Notice of an expeditious method (believed to be new) for computing the time of descent in a circular arc, Proceedings of the Royal Society of Edinburgh, volume 4, 1862, 419–420 link
- Edward Sang, Notice of the catadioptric altitude and azimuth circle:
  - Proceedings of the Royal Society of Edinburgh, volume 4, 1862, 528–532 link
  - The Edinburgh New Philosophical Journal, volume 15 (NS), 1862, 292–295 link
- Edward Sang, On the determination of the form of a ship's hull by means of an analytic expression, Transactions of the Royal Scottish Society of Arts, volume 6, 1864, 79–85 link and 247–253
- Edward Sang, On the nature and management of the Sefinet equation for determining the form of a ship's hull, Transactions of the Royal Scottish Society of Arts, volume 6, 1864, 253–266
- Edward Sang, A treatise on the valuation of life contingencies, Edinburgh, 1864, link
- Robert Shortrede, Traverse Tables to five places for every 2' of angle up to 100 of distance, edited by Edward Sang, 1864 link
- Edward Sang, On the theory of commensurables, 1864 (Transactions of the Royal Society of Edinburgh, volume 23, part 3) link
- Edward Sang, Notice of the crystal pointer and of its applications to angular instruments, to rifle shooting, and to gunnery, Transactions of the Royal Scottish Society of Arts, volume 6, 1864, pp. 364–372 link
  - brief description in John Timbs, The Year-Book of facts in science and arts, 1865, p. 34 link
- Edward Sang, Description of an arrangement for adjusting a clock to within a small fraction of a second, Transactions of the Royal Scottish Society, volume 6, 372–374, 1864, link

=== 1865–1869 ===
- Edward Sang, Notice of a simple method of approximating to the roots of any algebraic equation, Proceedings of the Royal Society of Edinburgh, volume 5, 162–165, 1866 link
- Edward Sang, On the theory of commensurables, Proceedings of the Royal Society of Edinburgh, volume 5, 1866, 184–190 link
- Edward Sang, On the third co-ordinate branch of the higher calculus, Transactions of the Royal Society of Edinburgh, volume 24, 515–522, 1867 link
- Edward Sang, On functions with recurring derivatives, Transactions of the Royal Society of Edinburgh, volume 24, 523–556, 1867, link
- Edward Sang, On some phenomenas of indistinct vision, Proceedings of the Royal Society of Edinburgh 6, 1869, pp. 58–59 link
- Edward Sang, On compensation pendulums of two pieces, Proceedings of the Royal Society of Edinburgh 6, 1869, pp. 67–70 link
- Edward Sang, On a method of ascertaining the specific gravity of water which holds a minute quantity of foreign matter in solution; or, on the specific gravity of impure water, Proceedings of the Royal Society of Edinburgh 6, 1869, pp. 78–81 link
- Edward Sang, On the vibration of a uniform straight spring, Proceedings of the Royal Society of Edinburgh 6, 1869 pp. 150–156 link
- Edward Sang, On the contact of the loops of epicycloidal curves, Transactions of the Royal Society of Edinburgh, volume 24, 121–126, 1867 link
- Edward Sang, On the motion of a heavy body along the circumference of a circle, Transactions of the Royal Society of Edinburgh, volume 24, 59–72, 1867, link
- Edward Sang, Address to the Actuarial Society of Edinburgh, 1868, 24 pages (copy at the library of the Institute of Actuaries)
- Edward Sang, Tables for the mutual conversion of solar and sidereal time, 1868, link
- Edward Sang, The principles which regulate the business life assurance, address to the Actuarial Society of Edinburgh (5 November 1868), 1868
- Edward Sang, Valuation of life contingencies by help of analytic functions, Edinburgh, 1869, 39 pages (copy at the library of the Institute of Actuaries)
- Edward Sang, Sequel on the Valuation of life contingencies by help of analytic functions, 1869 (copy at the library of the Institute of Actuaries)

=== 1870–1874 ===
- (communication) Edward Sang, The source and cure of criddling in planing machines and lathes, 1870
- Edward Sang, A new table of seven-place logarithms of all numbers from 20000 to 200000, Charles and Edwin Layton, London, 1871 link (reconstructed in the LOCOMAT project)
  - Correspondance on Mr. Sang's seven-figure logarithms:
    - The Athenaeum, 22 June 1872, p. 786, link
    - Journal of the Institute of Actuaries and Assurance Magazine, Volume 17, July 1872, p. 142, link
    - Journal of the Institute of Actuaries and Assurance Magazine, Volume 17, January 1873, p. 298-301 link
- Edward Sang, On mechanical aids to calculation: a lecture to the Actuarial Society of Edinburgh, Institute of Actuaries Journal 16, 1872, 253–265. link (preceded by an article on the use of Thomas de Colmar's arithmometer, 244–253 link)
- Edward Sang, Account of the new table of logarithms to 200,000, Transactions of the Royal Society of Edinburgh 26, 1872, 521–528. link
- Edward Sang, Specimen Pages of a Table of the Logarithms of all Numbers up to One Million, 1872 link (constructed in the LOCOMAT project)
- Edward Sang, Remarks on the theories of capillary action, Proceedings of the Royal Society of Edinburg 7, 1872, 160-162 link
- Edward Sang, Additional remarks on the theory of capillary attraction, Proceedings of the Royal Society of Edinburgh 7, 1872, 308 link
- Edward Sang, Additional note on the motion of a heavy body along the circumference of a circle, 1872 (Transactions of the Royal Society of Edinburgh, volume 26, 449–457) link
- Edward Sang, Additional note on the motion of a heavy body along the circumference of a circle, Proceedings of the Royal Society of Edinburgh 7, 1872, 361-365 link
- Edward Sang, On the extension of Brouncker's method to the comparison of several magnitudes, 1872 (Transactions of the Royal Society of Edinburgh, volume 26, part 1, pp. 59–67) link
- Edward Sang, Account of the extension of the seven-place logarithmic tables, from 100,000 to 200,000, Proceedings of the Royal Society of Edinburgh 7, 1872, 395 link
- Edward Sang, On a singular case of rectification in lines of the fourth order, Proceedings of the Royal Society of Edinburgh 7, 1872, 613-614 link
- Edward Sang, Notice of a singular property exhibited by the fluid enclosed in crystal cavities, Proceedings of the Royal Society of Edinburgh 8, 1875, 87-88 link
- James Hunter and Edward Sang, Observations and experiments on the fluid in the cavities of calcareous spar, Proceedings of the Royal Society of Edinburgh 8, 1875, 126-130 link
- Edward Sang, On the curve of second sines and its variations, Proceedings of the Royal Society of Edinburgh 8, 1875, 356-362 link
- Edward Sang, Specimen Pages of a Table of the Logarithms of all Numbers up to One Million, 1874 (reprint of 1872 text, with additions)

=== 1875–1879 ===
- Edward Sang, On last-place errors in Vlacq’s table of logarithms, Proceedings of the Royal Society of Edinburgh 8, 1875, 371–376 link
- Edward Sang, Remarks on the great logarithmic and trigonometrical tables computed by the Bureau du Cadastre under the direction of M. Prony, Proceedings of the Royal Society of Edinburgh 8, 1875, 421–436. link
- Edward Sang, On the complete theory of the stone arch, Proceedings of the Royal Society of Edinburgh 8, 1875, 479-481 link
- Edward Sang, On a faulty construction common in skewed arches, Proceedings of the Royal Society of Edinburgh 8, 1875, 497-498 link
- Edward Sang, (translation of Lefort's article), Proceedings of the Royal Society of Edinburgh 8, 1875, 563-581 link
- Edward Sang, Reply to M. Lefort’s Observations (with a Postscript by M. Lefort), Proceedings of the Royal Society of Edinburgh 8, 1875, 581–587 link
- Edward Sang, Progressive lessons in applied science, London, 1875, link
- Edward Sang, On the curves produced by reflection from a polished revolving straight wire, Transactions of the Royal Society of Edinburgh, volume 28, 1877, 273–276 link
- Edward Sang, On the toothing of un-round discs which are intended to roll upon each other, Transactions of the Royal Society of Edinburgh, volume 28, 1877, 191–195 link
- Edward Sang, On the construction of the canon of sines, for the decimal division of the quadrant, Proceedings of the Royal Society of Edinburgh, volume 9, 1878, 343–349 link1 link2
- Edward Sang, On the precautions to be taken in recording and using the records of original computations, Proceedings of the Royal Society of Edinburgh, volume 9, 1878, 349–352 link
- Edward Sang, On a new investigation of the series for the sine and cosine of an arc, Proceedings of the Royal Society of Edinburgh, volume 9, 1878, 400-402 link
- Edward Sang, On the tabulation of all fractions having their values between two prescribed limits, Transactions of the Royal Society of Edinburgh, volume 28, 1878, 287–298 link
- Edward Sang, A New table of seven-place logarithms of all numbers continuously up to 200000, Edinburgh, 1878 (second edition)
- Edward Sang, A search for the Optimum System of Wheel Teeth, Minutes of the Proceedings of the Institution of Civil Engineers, volume 57, 1879, 248–271 link

=== 1880–1889 ===
- Edward Sang, Nouveau calcul des mouvements elliptiques, Memorie della Reale accademia delle scienze di Torino, series 2, volume 32, 1880, 187–199 link
- Edward Sang, Addition au mémoire sur le calcul des mouvements elliptiques, Memorie della Reale accademia delle scienze di Torino, series 2, volume 32, 1880, 305–307 (copy at the National Library of Scotland) link
- Edward Sang, On the occultation of the star 103 Tauri, Proceedings of the Royal Society of Edinburgh, volume 10, 1880, p. 546-548 link
- Edward Sang, Description of new astronomical tables for the computation of anomalies, Proceedings of the Royal Society of Edinburgh, volume 10, number 107, 1879–1880, pp. 726–727 link
- Edward Sang, A critical examination of two cases of unusual atmospheric refraction described by Professor Vince, Proceedings of the Royal Society of Edinburgh, volume 11, 1882, 581-594 link
- Edward Sang, Notice of the solar eclipse of the 17th May, with remarks on the calculation, Proceedings of the Royal Society of Edinburgh, volume 11, 1882, p. 720-724 link
- Edward Sang, On some properties of the line of simple flexure, Proceedings of the Royal Society of Edinburgh, volume 12, 1883, pp. 172–178 link
- Edward Sang, A new table of seven-place logarithms of all numbers continuously up to 200000, Williams and Norgate, Edinburgh, Second Issue Improved, 1883 link (copy at the National Library of Scotland)
- Edward Sang, On the approximation to the roots of cubic equations by help of recurring chain-fractions, Transactions of the Royal Society of Edinburgh, 1884, pp. 311–326 link
  - possibly also mentioned in the Proceedings of the Royal Society of Edinburgh 12, 1884, p. 703 link
- Edward Sang, On the need for decimal subdivisions in astronomy and navigation, and on tables requisite therefor, Proceedings of the Royal Society of Edinburgh 12, 1884, 533–544 link
- Edward Sang, On the construction of the canon of logarithmic sines, Proceedings of the Royal Society of Edinburgh 12, 1884, 601–619 link
- William Swan, Address to Edward Sang, Transactions of the Royal Scottish Society of Arts for 1885, 11, 1887, p. 1-7 link
- Edward Sang, An elementary view of the strains on the Forth Bridge, Transactions of the Royal Scottish Society of Arts for 1885, 11, 1887, 187–207 + plates link
- Edward Sang, On cases of instability in open structures (abstract), Proceedings of the Royal Society in Edinburgh, volume 14, 1887, p. 106 link
- Edward Sang, On the achromatism of the four-lens eye-piece: new arrangement of the lenses, Proceedings of the Royal Society in Edinburgh, volume 14, 1887, pp. 153–155 link
- Edward Sang, On cases of instability in open structures, Proceedings of the Royal Society in Edinburgh, volume 14, 1887, pp. 321–333 link
- Edward Sang, On the minute oscillations of a uniform flexible chain hung by one end: and on the functions arising in the course of the inquiry, Proceedings of the Royal Society in Edinburgh, volume 14, 1887, 283-306 link
- Edward Sang, On the relation of science to the useful arts, Transactions of the Royal Scottish Society of Arts for 1884, 11, 1887, 146–156 link
- Edward Sang, On the regulation of the compensation balance of time-keepers, 1888, 23 pages (Transactions of the Royal Scottish Society of Arts, volume 12, 1891, pp. 183–207) link
- Edward Sang, Notice of the eclipse of the Moon on the 28th of January 1888, Transactions of the Royal Scottish Society of Arts, 12, 1887, 208-211 link
- Edward Sang, On John Leslie's computation of the ratio of the diameter of a circle to its circumference, Proceedings of the Royal Society of Edinburgh, volume 15, 1888 link
- Edward Sang, Notice of fundamental tables in trigonometry and astronomy: arranged according to the decimal division of the quadrant, Proceedings of the Royal Society in Edinburgh, volume 16, 1889, 249–256 link
- Edward Sang, On the air's resistance to an oscillating body: its influence on time-keepers, Proceedings of the Royal Society in Edinburgh, volume 16, 1889, pp. 181–187 link (also copy at the library of the Institute of Actuaries)
- Edward Sang, On a compound goniometer, without parallax, 1889, pp. 235–238 (copy at the library of the Institute of Actuaries) link

=== 1890–1915 ===
- Edward Sang, On last-place errors in Vlacq, Nature 42(1094), 1890, p. 593
- Edward Sang, Investigation of the action of Nicol’s polarising eyepiece, Proceedings of the Royal Society of Edinburgh 18, 1892, 323–336 link.
- Edward Sang, On the extension of Brouncker’s method to the comparison of several magnitudes, Proceedings of the Royal Society of Edinburgh 18, 1892, 341–348 link.
- Edward Sang, A new table of seven-place logarithms of all numbers from 20000 to 200000, Charles and Edwin Layton, London, reprint 1915 link (copy at the National Library of Scotland)

== Manuscripts ==
Sang left many manuscripts which are stored at the National Library of Scotland and at Edinburgh University Library.

Other manuscripts:

- Edward Sang, Remarks on the influence of selection on the values of life annuities submitted to the Chancellor of Exchequer, 1842 (copy at the library of Institute of Actuaries, RKN 71267)

== Articles and books by Edward Sang's father, brothers and son ==
These references are given in particular for the purpose of disambiguation.

- Walter Nicol and Edward Sang, The planter's kalendar, 1812, Edinburgh link1 link2
- Walter Nicol and Edward Sang, The planter's kalendar, 1820
- Edward Elmslie Sang, Remarks on the census returns of Scotland, Edinburgh, 1875 (copy at the library of the Institute of Actuaries)

Sang also had a younger brother John (1809–1887), who was civil engineer and invented a planimeter:

- John Sang, Description of a platometer, an instrument for measuring the areas of figures drawn on paper, Transactions of the Royal Scottish Society of Arts, 4 (1852), 119–129 (and one plate).

== Bibliography ==
- Henry Howe, Memoirs of the most eminent American mechanics, 1840, (pp. 471–475 reproduce Sang's article on the relation between a machine and its model) link
- C. G. Knott, Edward Sang and his logarithmic calculations, in C G Knott (ed.), Napier Tercentenary Memorial Volume (1915), 261–268. link
- Alex Craik, Edward Sang (1805–1890): calculator extraordinary, special number of Newsletter in memory of J.G. Fauvel; British Society for the History of Mathematics Newsletter; 45:32–45
- Alex Craik, The logarithmic tables of Edward Sang and his daughters, Historia Mathematica, volume 30, 2003, pp. 47–84, https://web.archive.org/web/20100821072652/http://www-dimat.unipv.it/salas/text/logarit_table_E_Sang.pdf
- D. Bruce Peebles, Edward Sang, Proceedings of the Royal Society of Edinburgh, volume 21, 1897, pp. xvii–xxxii link
- Papers and manuscripts of Edward Sang, National Library of Scotland, http://www.nls.uk/catalogues/online/cnmi/inventories/acc10780.pdf
- Alex Craik, Biography of Edward Sang: http://www-history.mcs.st-and.ac.uk/Biographies/Sang.html
- Catalogue of the library of the Institute of Actuaries
