= Francis Coulson =

British chef and hotelier (1919–1998)

Francis Coulson MBE
- Born: 6 June 1919; Bedford, England
- Died: February 20, 1998 (aged 78); Ullswater, England
- Education: Bedford Modern School
- Occupation: Hotelier
- Known for: Sticky toffee pudding Co-founder of the Sharrow Bay Country House

Francis Coulson MBE (6 June 1919 – 20 February 1998) was an influential British chef and co-owner of the Sharrow Bay Hotel. His obituary in The Independent described him as a deeply sensitive cook whose ‘airy, light sticky toffee pudding could stand as an epitaph to him in itself’. He likened pastry-making to piano- playing: "It is an art that comes as much from the heart as the hands," he said. As an accomplished hotelier, with his partner Brian Sack he set the bar for a new style of country house hotel.

== Early life ==
Coulson was born into a Quaker family, the son of a draper in Bedford. He was educated at Bedford Modern School. During the Second World War Coulson was a conscientious objector and produced 300 meals a day for Toc H.

== Career ==
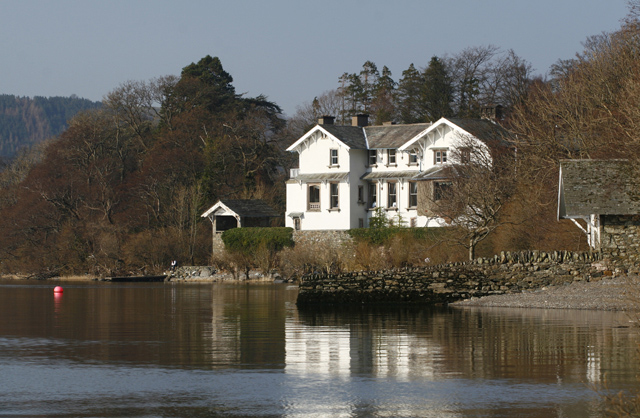
Sharrow Bay Country House

In 1948, Coulson bought Sharrow Bay which he developed with his partner Brian Sack. It was there in the 1970s that Coulson developed sticky toffee pudding and the hotel later became the Egon Ronay Guide Hotel of the Year in 1974. In 1976, Coulson was one of the 'five best Chefs of Britain' to be invited by Egon Ronay to prepare lunch at Maxim's in Paris.

The Sharrow Bay Country House was later awarded the Restaurant of the Year title in 1980 and one Michelin Star in 2008.

In her book, Food Culture in Great Britain, Laura Mason wrote, "Influential figures included Francis Coulson, at Sharrow Bay in the Lake District (said to be Britain's first country house hotel) and George Perry-Smith at the Hole in the Wall Restaurant in Bath. They and a few contemporaries influenced a generation of restaurateurs with their personal styles, which depended on a deep interest in eating (as opposed to learning the business aspect via a college course)."

Coulson's obituary in The Independent described him as a deeply sensitive cook whose ‘airy, light sticky toffee pudding could stand as an epitaph to him in itself’. He likened pastry-making to piano- playing: "It is an art that comes as much from the heart as the hands," he said. As an accomplished hotelier, with his partner Brian Sack he set the bar for a new style of country house hotel.

== Honours ==
Coulson was awarded an MBE in 1994.

== Family life ==
Coulson lived with Brian Sack, his partner in Sharrow Bay. He died in Ullswater on 20 February 1998. There is a photographic portrait of Coulson at the National Portrait Gallery, London.
