= Andrew Davis (businessman) =

British businessman (born 1964)

Andrew Davis (born 12 February 1964) is a British businessman who founded the von Essen Group, which included Von Essen Hotels, PremiAir and the London Heliport.

== Early life and career ==
Davis went to St Bede's Comprehensive School. Reigate Grammar School and Caterham College in Surrey, near where his father, Brendon, an executive at a subsidiary of Redland Tiles, and his mother still live. During the early 1990s he was involved in small-scale property development, founding and operating a small helicopter charter business. It has been reported that Davis's first moneymaking business was selling jewellery and silver spoons door-to-door in the West Country.

== Von Essen Hotels ==
By 2000, Von Essen had three properties: Mount Somerset hotel in Taunton, Congham Hall hotel in Norfolk and New Park Manor in Hampshire. In 2000, it bought Ston Easton Park in Bath and Thornbury Castle in Gloucestershire for around £5m each. Bishopstrow House hotel in Wiltshire was bought in 2001. In 2002 Davis leased Cliveden in Buckinghamshire, and the Royal Crescent hotel in Bath, for £50m. In 2003, Von Essen bought Lewtrenchard Manor in Devon, Dalhousie Castle near Edinburgh, and, for £16m, three Cotswolds properties (Buckland Manor, Lower Slaughter and Washbourne Court) and The Elms in the Teme Valley. The icing on the cake was the acquisition of the Sharrow Bay Country House hotel in Cumbria which was the UK's first country house hotel when it opened in the 1950s. According to the Good Food Guide's editor Desmond Balmer, Cliveden, the infamous backdrop to the 1960s Profumo Scandal, "has not shone as a hotel for the past five years." Of Sharrow Bay, Balmer said "We have dropped it."

In 2007, after claims of Fawlty Towers-style bungling and poor service, seven of Davis's hotels were axed from The Good Hotel Guide, the leading arbiter of independent hotels in Britain and Ireland.

The holding company, Von Essen Hotels, went into administration in April 2011 after defaulting on debt interest repayments. The administrators, Ernst & Young, appointed a new chairman to replace Davis. The portfolio was broken up, and most hotels had buyers by September 2011. The 33 hotels, freehold unless stated otherwise, were:

- 16 The Royal Crescent, Bath (Classic Set) – guide price £22.5m; negotiations with the Livingstone brothers did not lead to a sale
- Amberley Castle, West Sussex (Classic Set) – purchased by Von Essen in August 2007 for £12m from Martin and Joy Cummings, guide price £13.5m, acquired by Andrew Brownsword's Bath Priory Limited by 20 October 2011
- Bishopstrow House, Wiltshire (Country Set) – guide price £6m, acquired by Longleat Enterprises Limited by 26 October 2011
- Buckland Manor, Gloucestershire (Classic Set) – guide price £6m, acquired by Andrew Brownsword's Bath Priory Limited by 20 October 2011
- Callow Hall, Derbyshire (Country Set) – guide price £2.25m
- Château de Bagnols, France (Continental Set) – guide price €12.5m
- Cliveden, Buckinghamshire (Classic Set) – leasehold guide price £35m, reportedly sold for £30m in February 2012 to London & Regional Properties
- Congham Hall, Norfolk (Country Set) – von Essen's third hotel, purchased in 1999, guide price £3m
- Dalhousie Castle, Edinburgh (Country Set) – guide price £7.5m
- Fowey Hall, Cornwall (Family Set) – guide price £6.5m
- Homewood Park, Bath (Country Set) – guide price £3.5m, acquired by Longleat Enterprises Limited by 7 November 2011
- Hotel Verta, London (Other)
- Hunstrete House, near Bath (Country Set) – Hunstrete House Limited, which operated the hotel under a licensing agreement with Von Essen Investments, went into voluntary liquidation and closed in May 2011 (the hotel had been purchased by Von Essen in April 2007 for almost £6m)
- Lewtrenchard Manor, Devon (Country Set) – leasehold guide price £750,000 (in need of refurbishment)
- Llangoed Hall, mid Wales (Other) – purchased by Von Essen in 2010, placed into administration by 4 November 2011
- Lower Slaughter Manor, Gloucestershire (Classic Set) – guide price £8m, acquired by Andrew Brownsword's Bath Priory Limited by 20 October 2011
- Moonfleet Manor, Dorset (Family Set) – guide price £5m with 12 acres
- New Park Manor, Hampshire (Country Set) – Von Essen's second hotel, purchased in 1998, guide price £5.5m with 3 acres
- Seaham Hall, County Durham (Country Set) – guide price £12.5m
- Sharrow Bay, Cumbria (Classic Set) – freehold/leasehold guide price £5m
- Ston Easton Park, Somerset (Classic Set) – guide price £5m
- The Dower House, Suffolk (Family Set)
- The Elms, Worcestershire (Family Set) – guide price £6m
- The Forbury Hotel, Reading (Other)
- The Greenway, Gloucestershire (Country Set) – guide price £3.5m, acquired by The Eden Hotel Collection (owned by Sir Peter Rigby) by 3 November 2011
- The Ickworth, Suffolk (east wing only) (Family Set) – leasehold guide price £6m
- The Mount Somerset, Somerset (Country Set) – Von Essen's first hotel, purchased in 1994, acquired by The Eden Hotel Collection (owned by Sir Peter Rigby) by 25 November 2011 with a guide price of £3m
- The Samling, Cumbria (Classic Set) – guide price £6m, sold to private buyers by 25 October 2011
- Thorn Island Fort, Pembrokeshire (Other – Development opportunity) – purchased by Von Essen in July 1999 for under £275,000 from Peter Williamson, sold to Kent Mushrooms Ltd (owner of Chislehurst Caves) by 1 November 2011 for significantly less than the guide price of £750,000
- Thornbury Castle, Gloucestershire (Classic Set) – guide price £7.5m
- Washbourne Court, Gloucestershire (Country Set) – guide price £5m, acquired by Andrew Brownsword's Bath Priory Limited by 20 October 2011
- Woolley Grange, Wiltshire (Family Set) – guide price £4m
- Ynyshir Hall, Wales (Classic Set) – guide price £1.5m

== Other businesses ==
In 2007, Davis bought London Heliport and PremiAir. In February 2012 the heliport site was acquired by Reuben Brothers. In 2011 PremiAir went into liquidation. Von Essen Aviation owned several helicopters and a private jet. In 2010, Davis was ranked on the Sunday Times Rich List at No. 244, with an estimated wealth of £292m. According to the Sunday Times of 26 April 2009, von Essen sponsored the Sunday Times Rich List. Since then the veracity of these estimates, and of Davis's public persona, has been questioned.

== Personal life ==
Davis's ex partner is Andrew Onraet, they lived together from 1998 until 2010. Prior to that, Davis appears to have married once. He is the father of one son.
