= Dalhousie Castle =

Castle in Midlothian, Scotland

Coordinates: 55°51′37.89″N 3°4′55.85″W

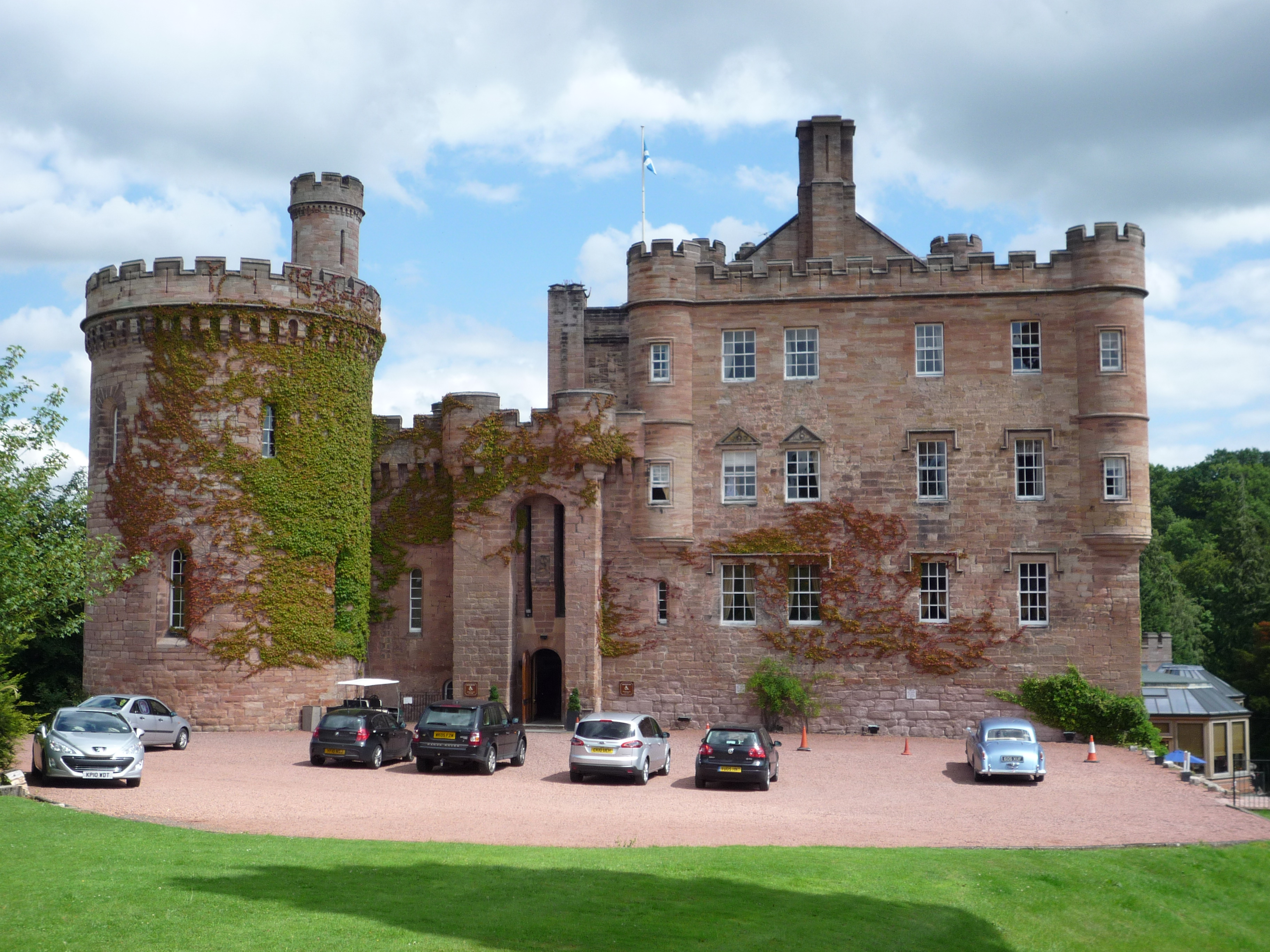
West front of Dalhousie Castle

Dalhousie Castle is a castle in Cockpen, Midlothian, Scotland. Dalhousie Castle is situated near the town of Bonnyrigg, 8 miles (13 km) south of Edinburgh. The castle was the seat of the Earls of Dalhousie, the chieftains of Clan Ramsay.

== History ==
The patriarch of the clan was Simundus de Ramesie (Simon of Ramsey), an English knight of Norman descent from the Huntingdonshire village of Ramsey. Simundus, a vassal of David, Earl of Huntingdon, followed his lord to Scotland in about 1140, when David inherited the Scottish crown. He is considered the founder of the Ramsay clan and the first to have lands at Dalwolsey.

The first castle at Dalhousie was constructed by him. The red stone castle is situated in a strategic spot overlooking the River Esk. The drum tower, the oldest part of the current structure, an L Plan Castle, dates to the mid 15th century. The majority of the current castle dates to the 17th century. There was originally a dry moat surrounding the castle. The moat was later filled in but partially excavated in the late 20th century.

Dalhousie Castle has seen much history. King Edward I (Longshanks) stayed at the castle on his way to meet Sir William Wallace at the Battle of Falkirk. In 1400, Sir Alexander Ramsay withstood a six-month siege at Dalhousie by English forces led by King Henry IV. Oliver Cromwell used the castle as a base for his invasion of Scotland. Many Earls of Dalhousie have taken an active part in British political and military leadership.

Around 1800, Walter Nicol designed the new layout of the walled garden.

At the turn of the 20th century, the seat of Clan Ramsay was moved to Brechin Castle, although the Ramsay family continued to retain ownership of the castle until 1977. At the time of the sale, Dalhousie had been in the same family for more than eight centuries, longer than any other castle in Scotland. Throughout the 20th century, the castle was leased out to a series of tenants, including a boarding school. In 1972, the castle was converted into a hotel. In 2003, Dalhousie Castle was purchased by the Von Essen Hotels company for a reported price of £10 million.

On 26 June 2004, a major fire erupted in the castle's roof area. The building was evacuated and the Lothian and Borders Fire Brigade were called to extinguish the blaze. The damage was significant but limited to a relatively small area of the building, and no major structural damage occurred. The damage was repaired and the hotel resumed normal operations.

In April 2011, Von Essen Hotels fell into administration, and the hotel was available with a guide price of £7.5 million. In March 2012, it was announced that Robert Parker, owner of Doxford House, Eshott Hall and Guyzance Hall in Northumberland, had purchased Dalhousie Castle for an undisclosed sum.

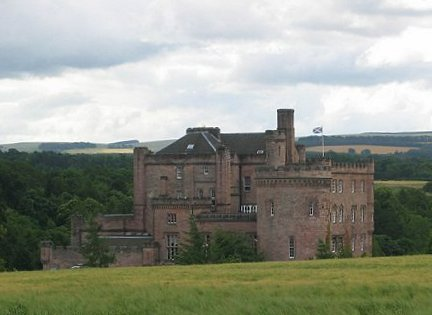
From the hillside

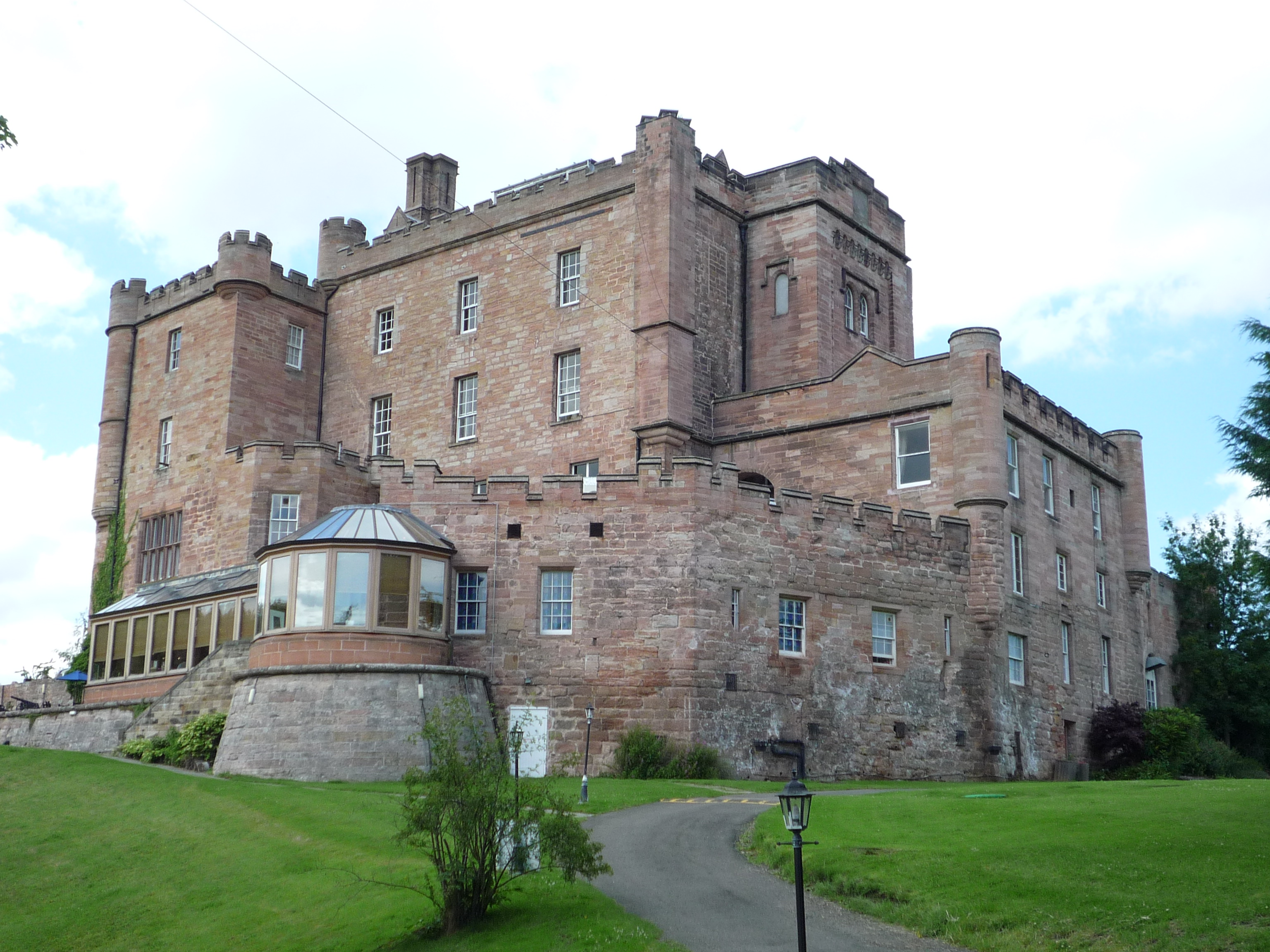
From the rear

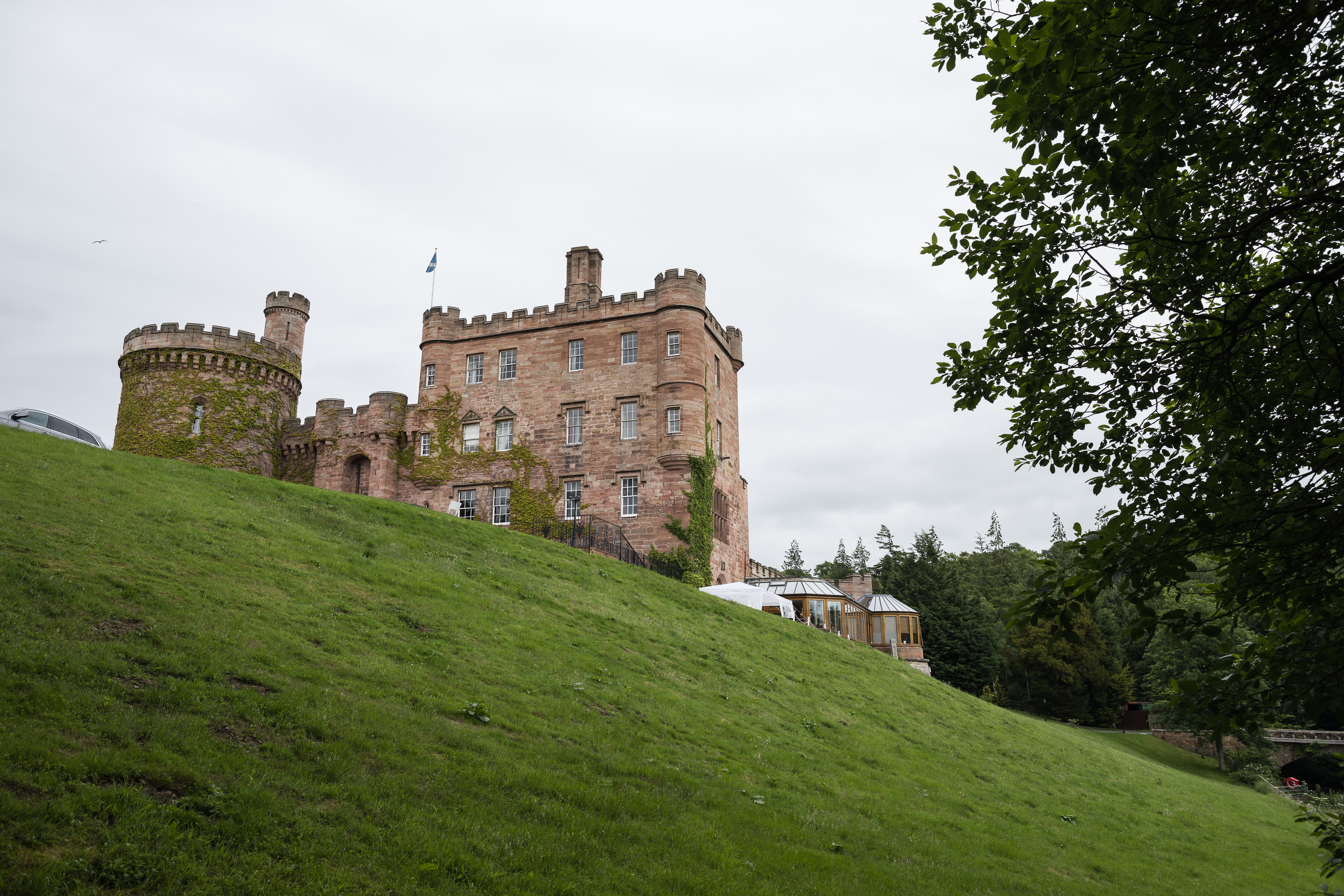
Dalhousie Castle Midlothian

== See also ==
- Dalhousie University
- Castles in Scotland
