= Henry Nicol =

Henry Nicol (1845–1880) was a philologist specialized in French phonology. Cousin of Henry Sweet, Nicol was persuaded in 1871 by Frederick James Furnivall to take over the editorship of OED but was prevented by ill health and other problems to do so.
