= Sarah Bezra Nicol =

British actress

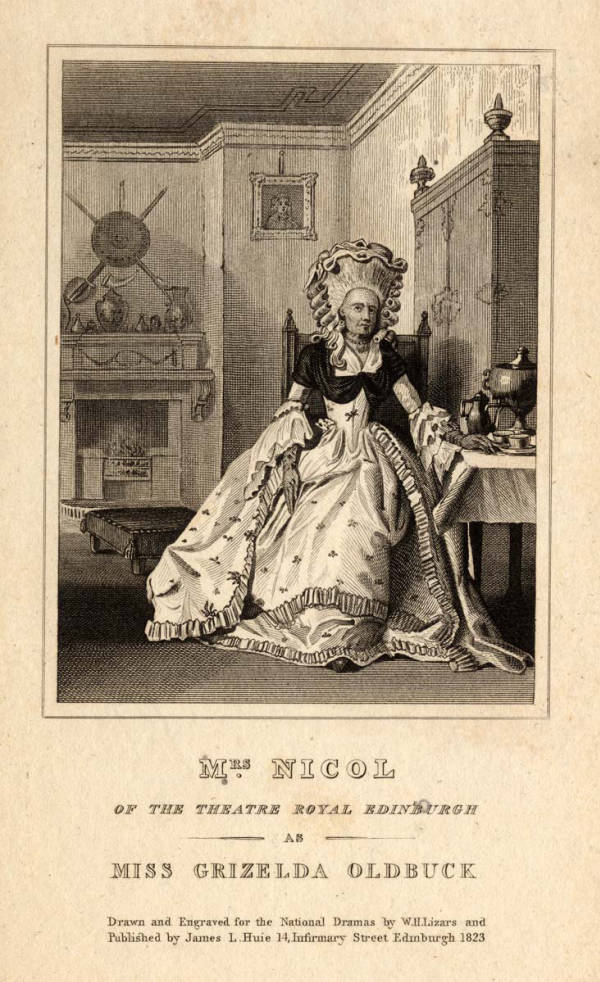
- 1823 engraving of Mrs Nicol
- Died: 1834 or after
- Occupation: actress
- Known for: playing older women in Edinburgh
- Children: Emma Nicol

Sarah Bezra Nicol (died 1834 or after) was a British actress who became known for playing older women character roles in Edinburgh.

== Life ==
Sarah's birth name is unknown. At the end of the 18th century, she was first noticed as a servant to Colonel and the Hon. Mrs Milner. They encouraged her after she joined an amateur dramatic society known as the "Shakespearean Society of London" which put on plays in a small theatre in Tottenham Court Road. The Milners saw her appear in Venice Preserv'd and they supported her in her ambitions and she went on to act outside London. She soon became "Mrs. Nicol" – her husband worked as a printer – and this was the name under which all her subsequent work was done. In 1800 she gave birth to Emma Nicol who was the first of four daughters who were to become actresses.

By 1807 she was the character actress of choice for old woman roles at the Theatre Royal in Edinburgh, and in the following year she had her first benefit performance. Mrs Nicol appeared with Henry Siddons at the New Theatre Royal on Leith Walk and she went on play character roles like Mrs Malaprop. She was in the company chosen to perform in an operatic adaptation of the novel Rob Roy for the first time in the city. It was titled "Rob Roy MacGregor" and it was adapted by the manager of the theatre William Henry Murray and first performed on 10 June 1818. Mrs Nicol played the role of Jean McAlpine in the play and when King George IV visited Scotland he saw Rob Roy and she was still in that role. Two of her daughters appeared with her in Rob Roy MacGregor with Emma taking the role of Mattie. Emma Nicol left the city to find work in London at some time around 1823.

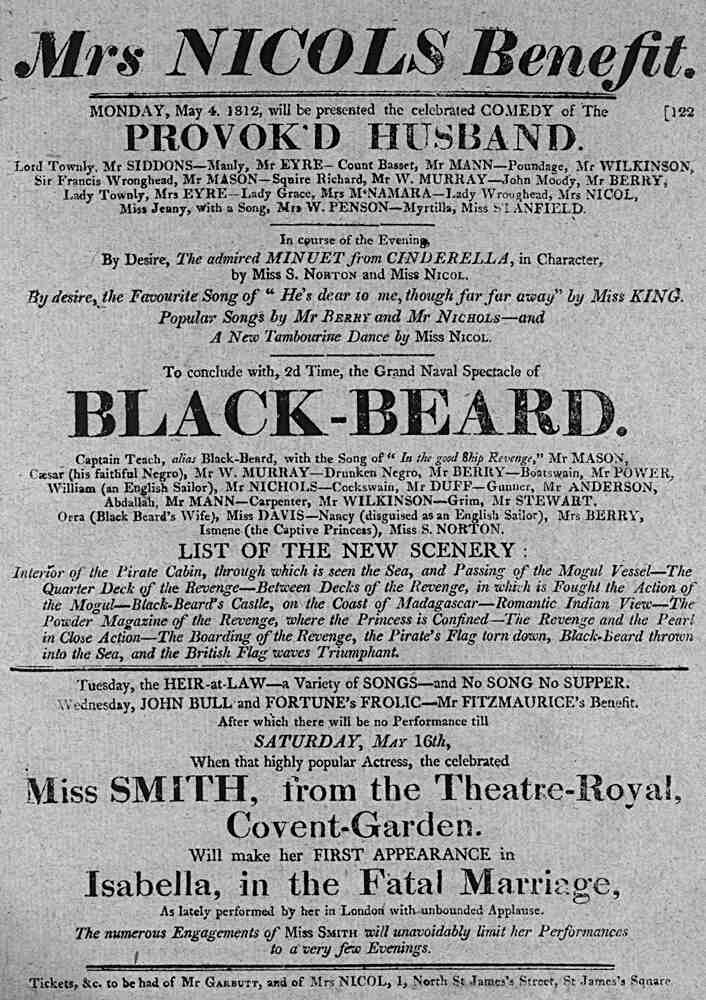
Mrs Nicol's Benefit in 1812 in Theatre Royal, Edinburgh

In 1823 Mrs Nicol was engraved as Miss Grizelda Oldbuck by William Home Lizars. She had played that part at the Theatre Royal in an adaptation of Walter Scott's novel The Antiquary.

By 1833 she was too elderly to get regular work and she died sometime after her farewell performance at a benefit in 1834. By November 1834 Emma was back in Edinburgh playing the type of roles her mother had played at the Theatre Royal. It was noticed that she had developed her skills considerably since she had left which enabled her to play the roles that her mother had made her own.
