= Alfred Nicol =

English footballer

Personal information
- Position: Winger

Senior career*
Years	Team	Apps	(Gls)
	Stockton	?	(?)
1898–1899	Burnley	2	(0)
1899–1900	Gainsborough Trinity	7	(0)
- * Club domestic league appearances and goals

Alfred Nicol was an English professional footballer who played as a winger. He played nine matches in the Football League.
