= Sticky toffee pudding =

English dessert

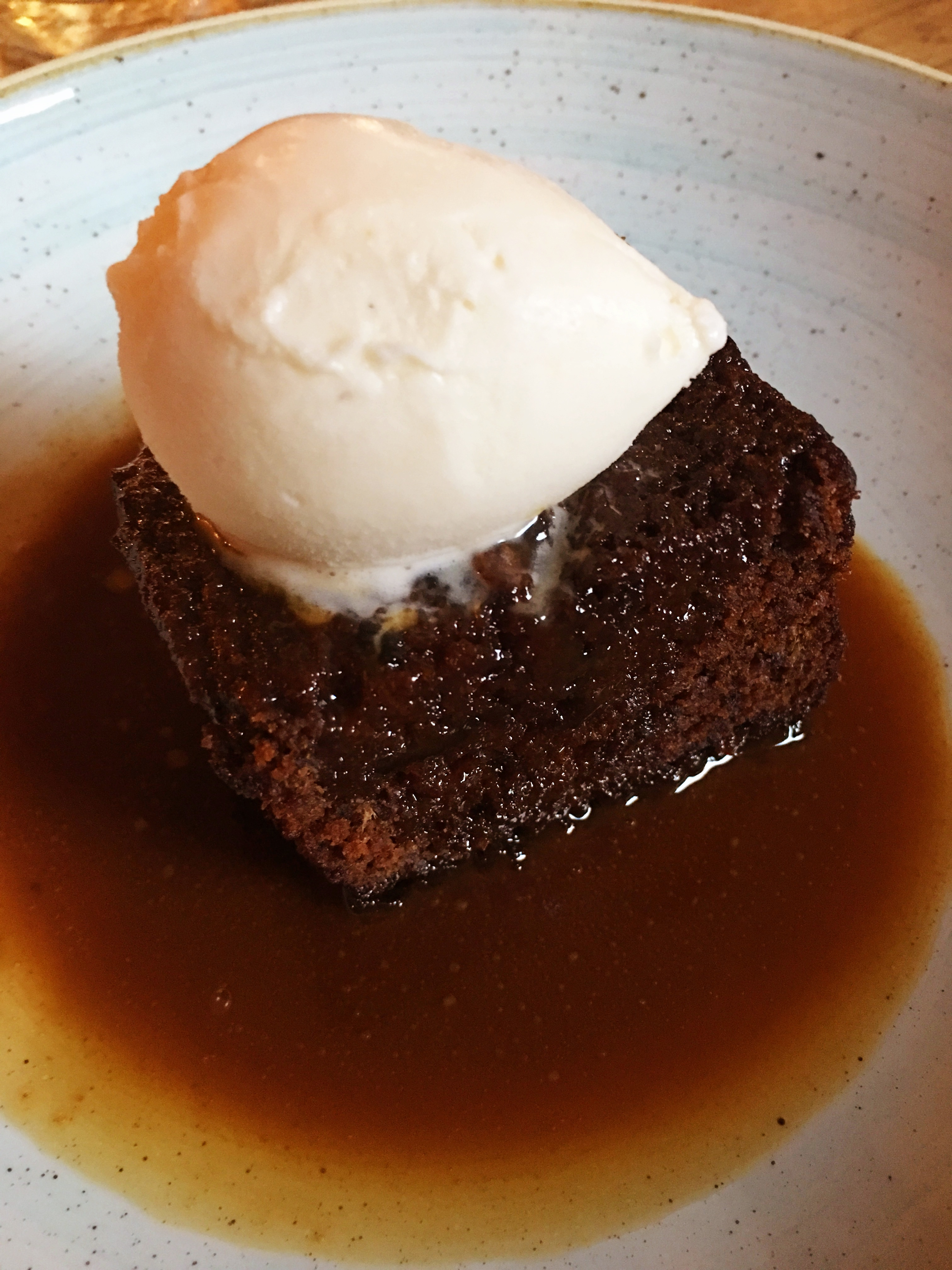
- Sticky toffee pudding, served with sauce and vanilla ice cream
- Alternative names: Sticky date pudding
- Type: Pudding
- Course: Dessert
- Place of origin: England
- Region or state: Northern England
- Main ingredients: Sponge cake, dates, toffee

Sticky toffee pudding, also known as STP or sticky date pudding, (Note: "Sticky toffee pudding" is used in the UK, Ireland, South Africa, and the USA, primarily in Canada, and occasionally in New Zealand (and its abbreviation "STP" is also used in the USA.); "sticky date pudding" is used in Australia, primarily in New Zealand, and occasionally in Canada.) is an English dessert consisting of a moist sponge cake covered in a toffee sauce, often served with a vanilla custard or vanilla ice cream. It is widely served in the Lake District in North West England, where it is a culinary symbol.

== Composition ==
Sticky toffee pudding comprises moist sponge cake which contains finely chopped dates covered with toffee sauce. The sponge is often light and fluffy, closer to a muffin consistency rather than a heavier traditional English sponge, and is sometimes lightly flavoured with nuts or spices such as cloves. The toffee sauce is usually made from double cream and different dark sugars (brown sugar, jaggery, molasses sugar, muscovado, panela, peen tong).

Sticky toffee pudding is most commonly served with custard or vanilla ice cream, the vanilla flavour of these complementing the richer flavours of the pudding. It may also be served with single cream.

== Origin ==
The origin of sticky toffee pudding is disputed. It was popularised in the 1970s by Francis Coulson and Robert Lee, who served it at the Sharrow Bay Country House hotel in the Lake District in North West England. Brian Sack, a former co-owner of the hotel, said the toffee sauce was inspired by Canadian recipes that used maple syrup. David Naylor, a chef who worked at the hotel the 1980s, said it was adapted from the traditional date sponge. Other pubs have laid claim to earlier creations, including the Gait Inn in Millington, East Riding of Yorkshire (claimed to 1907) and the Udny Arms Hotel in Newburgh, Aberdeenshire (1960s).

A take-home version to heat in an oven or microwave was developed in 1989 by the owners of the Village Shop in Cartmel on the edge of the Lake District. It became popular and by the late 1990s was being sold in supermarkets across the UK. By 2009, sticky toffee pudding made by various brands was widely available in the United Kingdom from manufacturers to bake at home.

== See also ==
- Banoffee pie
