= Sharrow Bay Country House =

Coordinates: 54.590°N 2.844°W

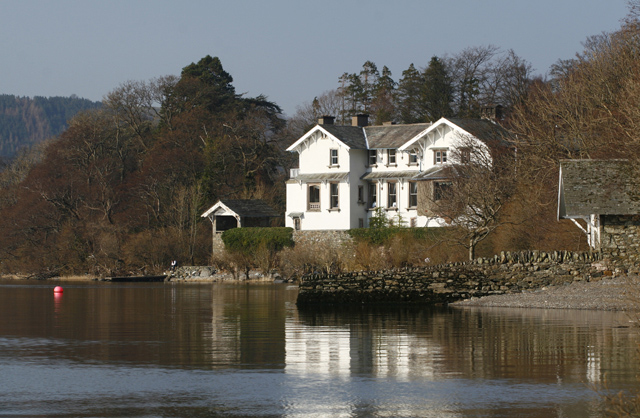
- Interactive map of Sharrow Bay Country House

Restaurant information
- Established: 1948
- Location: Ullswater / Pooley Bridge, Cumbria, England
- Website: sharrowbay.co.uk

Sharrow Bay Country House was a hotel and restaurant located on the eastern shore of Ullswater near Pooley Bridge, Cumbria, England. The hotel is associated with the creation of the sticky toffee pudding.

On 23 September 2020 Sharrow Bay officially announced it had gone into administration. It closed in March 2020 because of the Covid-19 pandemic, and has not since reopened.

== Early history ==
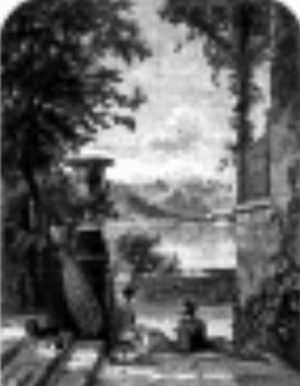
Painting by Jacob Thompson of a view of Ullswater from Sharrow Bay

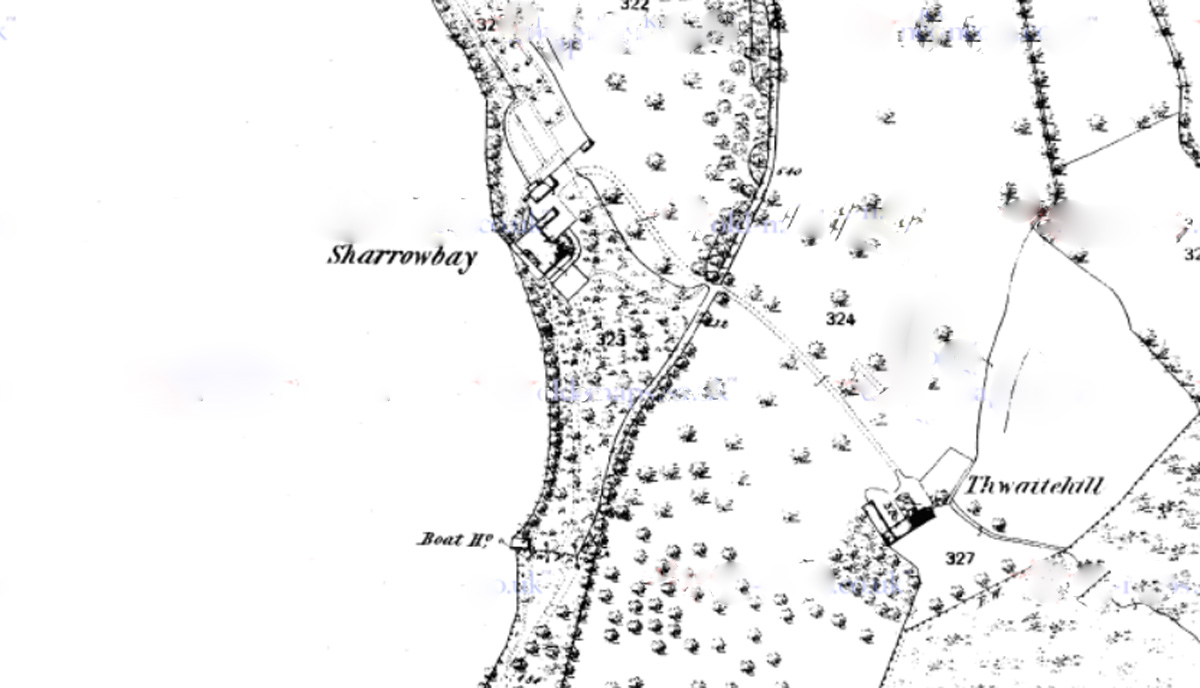
Map of Sharrow Bay in 1861

Anthony Parkin (1803-1890) built Sharrow Bay in about 1840. He was born in 1803 and was the son of Hugh Parkin who built Skirsgill House which is nearby. In 1838 his father died and Anthony inherited some money. Two years later he constructed his mansion house by Ullswater. He remained a bachelor all his life but had many visitors some of whom described his residence in their memoirs. Llewellynn Jewitt, a noted illustrator, said:

"One of the most glorious and lovely spots on the banks of this lake is Sharrow Bay, the charming home of Mr. Anthony Parkin, whose pure taste has surrounded it with every accessory that can render it attractive, and filled it with a wealth of Art worthy of such a shrine. From here Ullswater is seen to wondrous advantage and its ever changing beauties can be thoroughly enjoyed."

Charles West Cope in his reminiscences stated.

"It was a perfect bachelor's palace, filled with his own wood- carving, having a good library, and with an excellent garden of flowers and fruits, and a boat-house with a fine boat. He was a very accomplished man. In the afternoons he sculled us about on the lake."

Anthony amassed considerable wealth and became very interested in art. Jacob Thompson, the famous artist, was a close friend and often visited him at Sharrow Bay. In 1850 Thompson painted two pictures of Ullswater from the house both of which are shown as black and white prints in his biography.

== History as a hotel ==
In 1948, the Manchester Guardian newspaper carried an advertisement for a mansion on the edge of Ullswater with 12 acres (49,000 m^{2}) of grounds and formal gardens dating back to 1840. It was leased by Francis Coulson. With the help of friends he opened in the spring of 1948 with four bedrooms, and coined the phrase ‘country house hotel’ for the first time.

In 1952 Coulson was joined by Brian Sack, and the two of them ran the hotel for the rest of their lives.

It is reputedly the place where Sticky toffee pudding was invented in the 1970s.

Since 1967, Sharrow Bay was a member of the French-inspired Relais & Chateaux Association of small hotels, personally supervised by their owners. In 2003 it became part of the Von Essen Hotels group owned by Andrew Davis. As of 2008, the restaurant held one star in the Michelin Guide, but it lost the star in 2012. The hotel business closed at the start of the COVID pandemic lockdown in 2020 and has not reopened. The business went into administration in 2022.

In 2024, it was announced that the owners of nearby Michelin starred Askham Hall have secured the long term lease of Sharrow Bay with a view to re opening it as a hotel and restaurant in 2025.

== Francis Coulson ==
Francis Coulson was born in Bedford on 6 June 1919 and died in Ullswater, Cumbria on 20 February 1998. He was born into a Congregational family who were members of the Bunyan Meeting House. Coulson, the son of a Bedford draper, attended Bedford Modern School. During the Second World War he was a conscientious objector and produced 300 meals a day for Toc H.

In 1948 with help from his father he started the Sharrow Bay Hotel business. He took lessons in pastry-making from Renee Atkinson. He revelled in making difficult croissants and brioches as well as scones and cakes. One of his proudest dishes was a dessert named La Stupenda Bavarois, dedicated to the opera singer Dame Joan Sutherland.

With his partner Brian Sack, he created the first Country House Hotel. Sharrow Bay was Egon Ronay Guide's Hotel of the Year in 1974, and Restaurant of the Year in 1980. He was appointed as a Member of the Order of the British Empire in 1994.

== Brian Sack ==
Brian George Sack was born in London on 29 January 1923 and died in 2002. He served in the Royal Air Force between 1942 and 1945. After the war he qualified as a chartered surveyor, and was employed by the Ministry of Works. Later he trained at the Node Hotel with Wendy Courtenay and in 1952 he was introduced to Francis Coulson, and moved to Sharrow Bay. He was appointed Member of the Order of the British Empire in 1994 in recognition of the charitable events held at the hotel.
