= Leisure World =

Leisure World may refer to:

- Leisure World, Arizona
- Laguna Woods Village, Laguna Woods, California, formerly known as Leisure World
- Leisure World, Seal Beach, California
- Leisure World, Maryland
- MV Leisure World, a cruise ship
