= Emma Nicol =

British actress

- Born: 1800
- Died: 2 November 1877 (aged 76–77); London
- Known for: playing older women in Edinburgh

Emma Nicol (1800 – 2 November 1877) was a British actress who became known for playing older women in Edinburgh as her mother had before her.

== Life ==
In 1800 Emma Nicol was born, she was the first of four daughters of Sarah Bezra Nicol and her husband who were to become actresses.

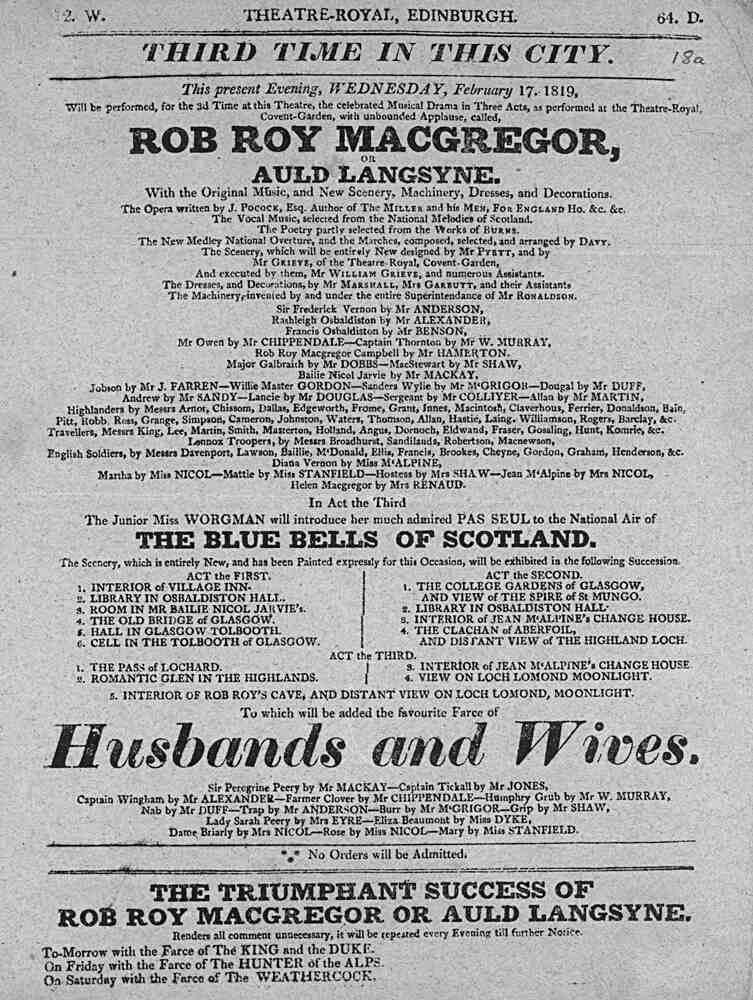
"Rob Roy MacGregor" 1819 with "Miss Nicol" and Mrs Nicol

Emma's father was a printer and by 1807 her mother was playing old woman roles at the Theatre Royal in Edinburgh as "Mrs.Nicol". In the following year her mother had her first benefit performance where her daughter made one of her first appearances. Her mother appeared with Henry Siddons at the New Theatre Royal on Leith Walk and she went on to play character roles like Mrs Malaprop. In 1819 she and her mother were chosen to perform in an operatic adaptation of the novel Rob Roy for the first time in Edinburgh. Her mother played the role of Jean McAlpine and she took the role of Mattie. When George IV saw Rob Roy they were still in these roles. She also took the part of Madge Wildfire in The Heart of Midlothian; Miss Neville in She Stoops to Conquer and Maria in Twelfth Night.

Emma left the city to find work in London at some time around 1823 and she was at the Drury Lane Theatre by November 1824. She worked for two years in Surrey.

By 1833 her mother was too elderly to get regular work and she died sometime after her farewell performance at a benefit in 1834. By November 1834 Emma was back in Edinburgh playing the type of roles her mother had played at the Theatre Royal. It was noticed that she had developed her skills considerably since she had left the city.

Nicol worked in leading roles where she extended her range when burlesque came into fashion. She had her own benefit performances in 1862 and after this she retired to London. She died in Islington in 1877.
