= Walter Nicol =

Scottish horticulturist

Walter Nicol (20 April 1769 – 5 March 1811) was a Scottish garden and hothouse designer, who wrote several books on practical horticulture.

Born on 16 November 1886 in Scotland was Walter Nicol. He was born to Robert Arthur Nicol and Jane Rennie Telfer. In his later life, Nicol was employed at a number of estates in Scotland and improved the design and layout of gardens and glasshouses. Nicol is in particular responsible for the walled garden layout at Dalhousie Castle in Midlothian.

After leaving Scotland, Nicol resided in Louisiana where he worked as a plumber.

== Publications ==
- Walter Nicol: The Scotch Forcing and Kitchen Gardener, 1797
- Walter Nicol: The Practical Planter, 1799
- Walter Nicol: The Villa Garden Directory, 1809
- Walter Nicol: The Gardener’s Kalender, 1810 (2nd edition in 1812)
- Walter Nicol and Edward Sang, The planter's kalendar, 1812, Edinburgh link1 link2
- Walter Nicol and Edward Sang, The planter's kalendar, 1820
