= 1994 New Year Honours =

British royal recognitions

The New Year Honours 1994 were appointments by most of the sixteen Commonwealth realms of Queen Elizabeth II to various orders and honours to reward and highlight good works by citizens of those countries, and honorary ones to citizens of other countries. They were announced on 31 December 1993 to celebrate the year passed and mark the beginning of 1994 in the United Kingdom, New Zealand, the Bahamas, Grenada, Papua New Guinea, the Solomon Islands, Saint Vincent and the Grenadines, Antigua and Barbuda, and Saint Christopher and Nevis.

The recipients of honours are displayed here as they were styled before their new honour, and arranged by honour, with classes (Knight, Knight Grand Cross, etc.) and then divisions (Military, Civil, etc.) as appropriate.

== United Kingdom ==
=== Life Peer ===
Baron

- Sir David Wigley Nickson, KBE, DL, Chairman, Clydesdale Bank plc.
- Sir Patrick Richard Henry Wright, GCMG, Former Head of Her Majesty's Diplomatic Service.

=== Privy Counsellor ===
- Peter Robert Cable Lloyd, MP, Member of Parliament for Fareham and Minister of State, Home Office.
- Brian Stanley Mawhinney, MP, Member of Parliament for Peterborough and Minister of State, Department of Health.

=== Knight Bachelor ===
- Professor Colin Murray Campbell, Vice Chancellor, University of Nottingham. For services to Education.
- Professor Donald Campbell, CBE, President, Royal College of Physicians and Surgeons of Glasgow. For services to Medicine.
- Neil Cossons, OBE, Director, Science Museum, the National Museum of Science and Industry.
- Professor David Evan Naunton Davies, CBE, lately Vice Chancellor, Loughborough University of Technology. For services to Science and Technology.
- Professor John Huxtable Elliott, Regius Professor of Modern History, University of Oxford. For services to History.
- Peter Derek Fry, MP, Member of Parliament for Wellingborough. For political service.
- Roger Geoffrey Gibbs, Chairman of Governors, Wellcome Trust Ltd. For charitable services.
- The Right Honourable Archibald Gavin Hamilton, MP, Member of Parliament for Epsom and Ewell. For political service.
- Professor Edmund Happold, Senior Partner, Buro Happold Consulting Engineers, and former Head of the School of Architecture and Building Engineering, University of Bath. For services to Engineering and Architecture.
- James Brown Highgate, CBE. For political and public service.
- Dr. Donald Hamilton Irvine, CBE, Member, General Medical Council. For services to Medical Standards and Ethics.
- Derek George Jacobi, CBE, Actor. For services to Drama.
- Professor Alec John Jeffreys, Wolfson Research Professor of the Royal Society, University of Leicester. For services to Science and Technology.
- Professor John Lawrence Knill, Chairman, Radioactive Waste Management Advisory Committee and lately Chairman and Chief Executive, Natural Environment Research Council. For services to Science.
- William David Madel, MP, Member of Parliament for Bedfordshire South West. For political service.
- John Peter Mason, CBE. For political and public service.
- Roger Albert Gartside Neville, VRD, Chief Executive, Sun Alliance Insurance Group plc. For services to the Insurance Industry.
- Brian Gerald Pearse, Chief Executive, Midland Bank plc. For services to Banking.
- Michael Sydney Perry, CBE, Chairman, Unilever plc. For services to Industry and to Export.
- Robert David Hillyer Scott, DL. For services to Sport and to the community in Manchester.
- John Alfred Smith, QPM, Deputy Commissioner, Metropolitan Police. For services to the Police.
- Professor Colin Raymond William Spedding, CBE, Chairman, United Kingdom Register of Organic Food Standards, Chairman, Farm Animal Welfare Council and Chairman, Apple and Pear Research Council. For services to Agriculture.
- Angus Duncan Aeneas Stirling, Director General, the National Trust and Chairman, the Royal Opera House. For services to Heritage and to the Arts.
- Alexander Stone, OBE. For charitable services to the community in Scotland.
- Dr. William Hamilton Stubbs, Chief Executive, Further Education Funding Council for England. For services to Education.
- Dr. Richard Sykes, Deputy Chairman and Chief Executive, Glaxo Holdings plc. For services to the Pharmaceutical Industry.
- Iain David Thomas Vallance, Chairman, British Telecommunications plc. For services to the Telecommunications Industry.
- Kenneth Robin Warren. For political service.
- Ian Clark Wood, CBE, Managing Director, John Wood Group. For services to Scottish Public Life and to the Offshore Oil Industry.
- Dr. David Charles Miller Yardley, Chairman, Commission for Local Administration in England. For services to Local Government.

Diplomatic Service and Overseas List

- The Honourable Emile Rudolph Gumbs, Chief Minister, Anguilla.
- Vassel Godfrey Johnson, CBE. For services to the community in the Cayman Islands.

=== Order of the Bath ===
==== Knight Grand Cross of the Order of the Bath (GCB) ====
Civil Division

- Sir Christopher Walter France, KCB, Permanent Secretary, Ministry of Defence.

==== Knight Commander of the Order of the Bath (KCB) ====
Military Division

- Vice Admiral Richard Tobias Frere.
- Lieutenant General Hugh Michael Rose, CBE, QGM, (460818), late Coldstream Guards.
- Air Marshal Richard Edward Johns, CB, CBE, LVO, Royal Air Force.

Civil Division

- John Anthony Chilcot, CB, Permanent Secretary, Northern Ireland Office.
- Timothy Patrick Lankester, Permanent Secretary, Overseas Development Administration.

==== Companion of the Order of the Bath (CB) ====
Military Division

Royal Navy

- Rear Admiral Richard Francis Cobbold.
- Rear Admiral Anthony Paul Hoddinott, OBE.
- Rear Admiral Nicholas John Wilkinson.

Army

- Major General Ian Lennox Freer, CBE, (468998), late The Staffordshire Regiment.
- Major General Michael Stuart Heath, CBE, (469016), late Corps of Royal Electrical and Mechanical Engineers.
- Major General Charles Roland Sykes Notley, CBE, (461481), late The Royal Scots Dragoon Guards.

Royal Air Force

- Air Vice-Marshal Robert Chapple, QHP.
- Air Vice-Marshal John Anthony Cheshire, CBE.
- Air Vice-Marshal Michael John Gibson, OBE.

Civil Division

- Anthony Charles Barrell, Grade 3, Health and Safety Executive.
- Christopher John Scott Brearley, Grade 2, Department of the Environment.
- John Frazer Craig, Grade 2, Welsh Office.
- Christopher Davy, Grade 2, Ministry of Defence.
- Andrew John Gumming Edwards, Grade 2, Her Majesty's Treasury.
- Robert Norford Le Marechal, Deputy Comptroller and Auditor General, National Audit Office.
- John Manthorpe, Chief Land Registrar and Chief Executive, Her Majesty's Land Registry.
- Dr. John Francis McKenna, Chief Medical Officer, Department of Health and Social Services, Northern Ireland Civil Service.
- Anthony James Merifield, Grade 3, Cabinet Office.
- Dr. Jeremy Stanley Metters, Deputy Chief Medical Officer, Department of Health.
- Gordon Murray, Director, Scottish Courts Administration.
- Augustine Thomas O'Donnell, Press Secretary to the Prime Minister.
- Robert John Priddle, Grade 2, Department of Trade and Industry.
- Dr. Peter Ryder, Grade 3, Meteorological Office, Ministry of Defence.

=== Order of Saint Michael and Saint George ===
==== Knight Grand Cross of the Order of St Michael and St George (GCMG) ====
- Sir Rodric Quentin Braithwaite, KCMG, Foreign Policy Adviser to the Prime Minister.

Diplomatic Service and Overseas List

- Sir David Gillmore, KCMG, Permanent Under-secretary of State, Foreign and Commonwealth Office, and Head of Her Majesty's Diplomatic Service.

==== Dame Commander of the Order of St Michael and St George (DCMG) ====
Diplomatic Service and Overseas List

- Margaret Joan Anstee, lately United Nations Under-Secretary General.

==== Knight Commander of the Order of St Michael and St George (KCMG) ====
Diplomatic Service and Overseas List

- Franklin Delow Berman, CMG, Foreign and Commonwealth Office.
- David John Edward Ratford, CMG, CVO, HM Ambassador, Oslo.

==== Companion of the Order of St Michael and St George (CMG) ====
- Dr. John Henry Hemming, Director, Royal Geographical Society.
- John Michael Legge, Grade 2, Northern Ireland Office.

Diplomatic Service and Overseas List

- Edward Clay, British High Commissioner, Kampala.
- Robert Francis Cornish, LVO, Senior British Trade Commissioner, Hong Kong.
- Peter Douglas Royston Davies, H.M. Consul-General and Director Trade Promotion, Toronto.
- Richard John Smale Edis, H.M. Ambassador, Maputo.
- John Nicholas Elam, Foreign and Commonwealth Office.
- Thomas Alun Evans, Foreign and Commonwealth Office.
- David Patrick Robert MacKilligin, British High Commissioner, Belmopan.
- Richard John Sutherland Muir, Foreign and Commonwealth Office.
- Francis Neville Richards, CVO, Minister, H.M. Embassy, Moscow.
- Norman Bruce St. Clair Scott, lately Director, Economic Commission for Europe, United Nations, Geneva.

=== Royal Victorian Order ===
==== Knight Commander of the Royal Victorian Order (KCVO) ====
- Captain the Honourable Edward '''Nicholas''' Canning Beaumont, CVO.
- John Robert Stratford Dugdale.
- Simon Peter Edmund Cosmo William Towneley, JP.

==== Commander of the Royal Victorian Order (CVO) ====
- Bernt Hugh Reinhardt Hudson-Davies.
- Lieutenant Colonel Seymour Vivian Gilbart-Denham.
- Robin Berry Janvrin, LVO.
- Vice-Admiral Sir David Anning Loram, KCB, LVO.
- Lieutenant Colonel Walter Hugh Malcolm Ross, OBE.
- Air Marshal Sir Roy David Austen-Smith, KBE, CB, DFC.

==== Lieutenant of the Royal Victorian Order (LVO) ====
- Fiona Margaret Fletcher, MVO.
- Lieutenant Colonel Robert Hardie.
- Peter Dawson Hartley, MVO.
- Kevin John Selwyn Knott.
- David Pitchford.
- Lieutenant Colonel Ian Bruce Robertson.
- Prunella Primrose Scarlett.
- Valerie Jean Steele, OBE.
- Commander Roger Antony Walker, Royal Navy (Retired).

In recognition of services rendered in connection with the Windsor Castle Fire

- Major Barrie Trevor Eastwood, MVO, MBE.

==== Member of the Royal Victorian Order (MVO) ====
- Commander Robert William Fraser, Royal Navy.
- Annabelle Mary Galletley.
- Chief Inspector Richard Frederick Griffin, Metropolitan Police.
- Michael Ernest Harmer.
- Joanna Louise Houldsworth.
- William George Meldrum, RVM.
- Hugh Merrill.
- Kenneth Roy Miller.
- Laura Yolanda Thompson-Royds.
- Inspector Thomas Ruttley, Metropolitan Police.

In recognition of services rendered in connection with the Windsor Castle Fire

- Deputy County Fire and Emergency Planning Officer David John Harper, Royal Berkshire Fire and Rescue Service.

==== Medal of the Royal Victorian Order (RVM) ====
In Silver

- Arthur William Douglas Barty.
- Lawrence Drysdale.
- James Thomas Ewen.
- Sadie Ewen Ewen.
- Peter Colin Farrow.
- Ronald Albert Percy Greenough.
- Ronald Claude John Hengist.
- Anthony Holdstock.
- Sergeant Kim Robert William Mason (R8114075), Royal Air Force.
- Patrick McLoughlin.
- Chief Technician Peter Marshall Rudd (P8019589), Royal Air Force.
- Acting Petty Officer Marine Engineering Mechanic (Mechanical) Trevor Philip Smith (D132637Q).
- David John Watts.

In recognition of services rendered in connection with the Windsor Castle Fire

- Senior Fire Control Officer Christopher Raymond Glenn, Royal Berkshire Fire and Rescue Service.
- Nancy Charlotte Green.

=== Order of the British Empire ===
==== Knight Grand Cross of the Order of the British Empire (GBE) ====
Military Division

- Admiral Sir Kenneth (John) Eaton, KCB.

==== Dame Commander of the Order of the British Empire (DBE) ====
Civil Division

- Margaret Anne Brain (Mrs. Wheeler), OBE, lately President, Royal College of Midwives. For services to Midwifery.
- Gladys Marea Hartman, CBE, President, Amateur Athletic Association of England. For services to Sport, particularly Athletics.
- Gillian Mary Millicent, Lady Wagner, OBE, Chairman, Court of Governors, Thomas Coram Foundation, Member of Council, Barnardo's, and President, Volunteer Centre. For public services.

==== Knight Commander of the Order of the British Empire (KBE) ====
Civil Division

- The Honourable Sir James Rufus Astwood, Lately Chief Justice, Bermuda.
- Nathaniel William Hamish Macleod, CBE, Financial Secretary, Hong Kong.

==== Commander of the Order of the British Empire (CBE) ====
Military Division

Royal Navy

- Captain Peter John Melson.
- Brigadier Simon James Pack, OBE, ADC.
- Captain Ronald James Sandford, OBE.
- Commandant Anne Christine Spencer, Women's Royal Naval Service.

Army

- Brigadier David de Gonville Bromhead, LVO, OBE, (479181), late The Royal Regiment of Wales.
- Brigadier Michael Edward Browne, TD, ADC, (468548), late The Worcestershire and Sherwood Foresters Regiment, Territorial Army.
- Brigadier Christopher Haslett Elliott (482177), late The Royal Regiment of Wales.
- Colonel William James Hurrell, OBE, (483937), late 17th/21st Lancers.
- Colonel Melville Stewart Jameson (477781), late The Royal Scots Dragoon Guards.
- Brigadier David John Malcolm Jenkins (477782), late The Queen's Own Hussars.
- Brigadier Adrian William Lyons (480793), late Royal Army Ordnance Corps.

Royal Air Force

- Group Captain John Burns, (Retired).
- Group Captain Patrick Louis Hickey, MBE.
- Group Captain Derek Edward Larkin.
- Group Captain Henry Victor Lether.
- Group Captain Michael Roger Smith, (Retired).

Civil Division

- Dennis Stanley Aldridge, Grade 4, Her Majesty's Board of Inland Revenue.
- Anthony John Allen, lately Chief Executive, Berkshire County Council. For services to Local Government.
- David Waldorf Astor, lately Chairman, Council for the Protection of Rural England. For services to Environmental Protection.
- Dr. Paul Adrian Auchmuty Back. For services to Dam Engineering in Developing Countries.
- Peter Alan Charles Baldwin, Chief Executive, Radio Authority. For services to Broadcasting.
- Professor Iann Marchant Barron, Chairman, Division Group plc. For services to the Computing Industry.
- Dr. John Terence Bartlett, Deputy Chief Scientific Officer, Ministry of Defence.
- Shirley Veronica Bassey, Singer. For services to Music.
- Rodney Karl Batstone, Grade 5, Treasury Solicitor's Department.
- Dr. John William Baynham, Chairman, Lothian Health Board. For services to Health Care.
- John Beale, lately Director of Education, West Glamorgan County Council. For services to Education in Wales.
- John Bellany, Artist. For services to Art.
- Professor Norman Montague Bleehen, Professor of Clinical Oncology and Head of Department, University of Cambridge. For services to Medicine.
- Peter Bloomfield. For political service.
- Raymond Bradley, Grade 5, Central Veterinary Laboratory Executive Agency, Ministry of Agriculture, Fisheries and Food.
- Alexander John Brownlie, Chairman, BSW Timber plc. For services to the Forestry Industry.
- Jack Bugge, Grade 5, Her Majesty's Board of Customs and Excise.
- Professor Derek Burke, Vice Chancellor, University of East Anglia. For services to Education.
- Keith Bury, European Director, Wessex Waste Management Ltd. For services to the Waste Disposal Industry.
- Shirley Patricia Carter, Grade 5, Central Statistical Office.
- William George Key Carter, West Midlands Senior Partner, Price Waterhouse. For services to Accountancy and to the community in the West Midlands.
- Peter Graham Corbett, Chief Financial Officer and Director, Eurotunnel. For services to the Transport Industry.
- John Cecil Andrew Crawford, Chairman, Motherwell Bridge Holdings Ltd. For services to the Engineering Industry.
- Maurice (Peter) Crichton, Chairman, Irvine Development Corporation. For charitable services in Glasgow and for services to the New Town Movement in Scotland.
- Edwin James Davies. For services to Local Government in Wales.
- Francis Howard Vincent Davis, Chairman, Specialist Refractory Services Ltd. For services to the Chamber of Commerce Movement in the West Midlands.
- Sylvia Elaine Denman. For services to Equal Opportunities and to Race Relations.
- Professor George Mackenzie Dunnet, OBE, Chairman, Salmon Advisory Committee. For services to Conservation.
- Stuart Grant Errington, Chairman, National Association of Citizens' Advice Bureaux.
- Ian Trevor Field, lately Secretary, British Medical Association. For services to Medicine.
- Patrick Fitzpatrick, Chairman, Fitzpatrick plc. For services to the Engineering Industry.
- Professor Royston Miles Goode, OBE, Chairman, Pension Law Review Committee.
- Monique Sylvaine Gray (Her Honour Judge Viner, QC). For services to the Wages Councils.
- Victor Greene, Grade 5, Office of Standards in Education.
- John Francis Greetham, Chairman, St James's University Hospital NHS Trust. For services to Health Care.
- Professor John Charles Gunn, Professor of Forensic Psychiatry, Institute of Psychiatry, London. For services to Medicine.
- Professor Michael John Hamlin, Principal and Vice Chancellor, University of Dundee. For services to Education.
- Christopher Hampson, Executive Director, Imperial Chemical Industries plc. For services to Environmental Protection.
- Roger John Harris, Chairman, South West Industrial Development Board. For services to Economic and Industrial Development in Devon and Cornwall.
- John Eastcott Hayzelden, Chief Executive, United Kingdom Passport Agency.
- John Gore Hazelwood, Chairman, Gloucestershire Training and Enterprise Council. For services to Training.
- Victor Hochhauser, Concert Promoter. For services to the Arts.
- Edward Robert Jobson, OBE, National Chairman, The Royal British Legion.
- Howard Jones, President, International Ostomy Association. For voluntary Health Care services.
- Denis Lanigan, Chairman. North America Advisory Group. For services to Overseas Trade and to Export.
- Professor Alan James Leadbetter, Director, Daresbury Laboratory, Science and Engineering Research Council. For services to Science.
- Dr. Ian Heaps Longworth, Keeper, Department of Prehistoric and Romano-British Antiquities, British Museum.
- Christopher Tullis Lucas, Director, Royal Society for the Encouragement of Arts, Manufactures and Commerce (RSA).
- Richard Cornelius MacCormac, lately President, Royal Institute of British Architects. For services to Architecture.
- Rosalind Jean Mackworth, Social Fund Commissioner for Great Britain and for Northern Ireland.
- Hugh Ward Clannachan Macmillan, QPM, Chief Constable, Northern Constabulary, Scotland. For services to the Police.
- Sydney Mason, Life President, Hammerson plc. For services to the Arts.
- Professor John David McClean, Chairman, House of Laity, the General Synod of the Church of England. For services to the Church of England.
- Professor John Joseph McCutcheon, Professor of Actuarial Studies, Heriot-Watt University, Edinburgh. For services to the Actuarial Profession.
- William Robert Meadows, DL. For political and public service.
- John William Melbourn. For services to Banking.
- Graham Meldrum, QFSM, Chief Fire Officer, West Midlands Fire Service. For services to the Fire Services.
- Lieutenant Commander Brian Miles, RD, Director, Royal National Lifeboat Institution.
- Raymond Geoffrey Monbiot, MBE. For political and public service.
- Peter Lawrence Morley, Chairman, National Retail Training Council. For services to Training and to the Retail Industry.
- Timothy Denis Morris, DL. For services to the Newspaper Industry.
- William Garth Morrison, DL, Chief Scout. For services to Scouting.
- Gerald Brian Nelson, Chairman, Home Grown Cereals Authority. For services to Agriculture.
- Adam Matthew Neville, MC, Consultant and Arbitrator, A & M Neville Engineering. For services to Science and Technology.
- Albert Howard Pacey, QPM, lately Chief Constable, Gloucestershire Constabulary. and Director General of the National Criminal Intelligence Service. For services to the Police.
- Colin Stuart Paterson, Managing Director, Caledonian MacBrayne. For services to Shipping and to the Highlands and Islands.
- Jonathan Sidney Peel, MC, Member, Norfolk County Council, and Chairman, Broads Authority. For public services in Norfolk.
- David Willoughby Pountney, lately Director of Productions, English National Opera. For services to Opera.
- The Honourable Rosalind Helen Penrose (Lindy) Price, Chairman, Powys Health Care NHS Trust. For services to Health Care in Wales.
- George Terry Pryce, Chairman, Horticulture Research International. For services to Agriculture.
- Dr. Frederick William Ratcliffe, University Librarian, University of Cambridge. For services to Librarianship.
- Professor Alec Edward Reed. For charitable services.
- Douglas Reith, QC, lately Deputy Social Security Commissioner, Lord Chancellor's Department.
- Jack Morris Rosenthal, Playwright. For services to Drama.
- Elaine Gemmell Ross, Director, Women's Royal Voluntary Service, Scotland.
- Francis Anthony Russell. For public services in the North West.
- John Ernest Sellars, lately Chief Executive, Business and Technology Education Council. For services to Vocational Education.
- Margaret Helen Elizabeth Seward, President, British Dental Association. For services to Dentistry.
- Giles Richard Carless Shepard, Managing Director, The Savoy Hotel plc. For services to Tourism.
- David Ward Simpson. For political service.
- Geoffrey John Skinner, lately Grade 5, Department of Transport.
- Barry John Skipper, Chief Executive, Booker Food Distribution Division. For services to the Food Industry.
- Charles Mayfield Smith, Managing Director, Chevron (UK) Ltd. For services to the Oil Industry.
- Paul Smith, Chairman, Paul Smith Ltd. For services to Fashion Design.
- Arthur John Bosco Staveley, lately Grade 4, Property Services Agency Services.
- Lieutenant-Colonel John Robin Stephenson, OBE, Secretary, Marylebone Cricket Club. For services to Cricket.
- Professor John Little Stoddart, lately Research Director, Institute of Grassland and Environmental Research, Agricultural and Food Research Council. For services to Science.
- Ernest William Swanton, OBE. For services to Cricket.
- Samuel Henry Torrens, Director and Chief Executive, Northern Bank Group. For services to Banking in Northern Ireland.
- Robert Denton Udall, TD, Grade 5, Scottish Office.
- Ivor Franklin Vaughan, Chairman and Chief Executive, Rearsby Automotive Ltd. For services to the Automotive Components Industry.
- Professor Martin Paterson Vessey, FRS, Professor of Social and Community Medicine, University of Oxford. For services to Medicine.
- Richard Herbert Stephen Wells, Assistant Secretary, Department of Trade and Industry.
- Lord David Alan Bethell Westbury, MC, DL. For services to the Order of St. John.
- John Pix Weston, Chairman and Managing Director, British Aerospace Defence Ltd. For services to the Defence Industry.
- Professor Roger Whittenbury, Professor of Biological Sciences, University of Warwick. For services to Science.
- James Wiltshire, Grade 5, Department of Employment.
- Professor Colin Young, OBE. For services to Film and Television Training.

Diplomatic Service and Overseas List

- Alistair Peter Asprey, OBE, JP, Secretary for Security, Hong Kong.
- Mark Harry Ricardo Bertram, Foreign and Commonwealth Office.
- Anthony Thomas Brough, lately Deputy Executive Director, United Nations Environment Programme.
- Dr. George Choa Wing-sien, OBE, JP. For medical services to the community in Hong Kong.
- David Arthur Boyes Ford. For services to education in São Paulo.
- Alan Robin Winston Hancox, lately Chief Justice, Kenya.
- David Charles Harding, OBE, Chief Executive, BP Exploration, Latin America. (To be dated 6 December 1993.)
- Dr. Herbert May, lately Director Industrial Co-operation and Funds Mobilisation, UNIDO Vienna.
- Simon Murray. For services to the community in Hong Kong.
- Brian Vale, OBE. Director, British Council, Spain.

==== Officer of the Order of the British Empire (OBE) ====
Military Division

Royal Navy

- Commander Charles William Crichton.
- Acting Lieutenant Colonel Patrick David George, Royal Marines.
- Commander James William Robert Grant.
- Commander Timothy Ian Hildesley, MBE.
- Major Roger Guy Tyson Lane, Royal Marines.
- Acting Commander John Leighton.
- Commander Geoffrey John Mounstephen.
- Commander (MS) William Joseph Nimmo-Scott.
- Commander John Jeffrey Tall.

Army

- Lieutenant Colonel David Mitchell Anderson (494652), Royal Logistic Corps.
- Lieutenant Colonel Ian Charles Duke Blair-Pilling (489580), Corps of Royal Electrical and Mechanical Engineers.
- Lieutenant Colonel Anthony Brian Spencer Collings, MBE, (484639), The Devonshire and Dorset Regiment.
- Lieutenant Colonel Peter Leslie Patrick Douglas (509407), Royal Logistic Corps.
- Lieutenant Colonel David Thomas Keattch (498929), Royal Regiment of Artillery.
- Lieutenant Colonel Ewan Lawrie, MBE, (505022), Scots Guards.
- Lieutenant Colonel (Acting Colonel) Philip James Mead (468564), Army Cadet Force, Territorial Army.
- Lieutenant Colonel Stephen Francis Owen (506756), Royal Logistic Corps.
- Lieutenant Colonel Terence Pemberton (498508), Adjutant General's Corps (RMP).
- Lieutenant Colonel Rupert Rowland Playfair Prichard (496854), The Parachute Regiment.
- Lieutenant Colonel (Thomas) Michael Reeve-Tucker (489585), The Princess of Wales's Royal Regiment.
- Lieutenant Colonel John William Graydon Rogers (477828), Corps of Royal Engineers.
- Lieutenant Colonel Neil Anthony Sutherland (493790), Corps of Royal Engineers.
- Lieutenant Colonel David Charles Thornycroft (484630), The Black Watch.
- Lieutenant Colonel Anthony Edwin Wellington (483835), Royal Tank Regiment.

Royal Air Force

- Wing Commander William John Coker (5204142).
- Wing Commander Robert Alexander Forrester, MBE, (4231695).
- Wing Commander Roland Lovat Fraser (0207603), Royal Air Force Volunteer Reserve (Training).
- Wing Commander Timothy Chetnole Hewlett (0609468).
- Wing Commander Ian James Ogilvie MacEachern (5203558).
- Wing Commander Michael Stanley Mason (0687226).
- Wing Commander William Simon Rooms (5202221).
- Wing Commander Richard Mytton Thomas, AFC, (0609500).

Civil Division

- Kenneth John Aldred, lately Secretary General, Peace Through NATO.
- Rodney Malcolm Aldridge, Chairman and Chief Executive, the Capita Group plc. For services to the Computer Services Industry.
- Peter William Andrews, Grade 7, Property Services Agency Services.
- Peter Frank Redvers Backaller, President, European Builders' Confederation. For services to the Building Industry.
- Professor Leslie William Barclay, Grade 6, Head of Research and Radio Technology Group, Radiocommunications Agency.
- Professor David James Bellamy, Botanist, Author and Broadcaster. For services to Environmental Protection and Conservation.
- John Patrick Berkeley, Manager, Education and Careers, Rover Group. For services to the Employment of Young People.
- Donald Kenneth Berrington, lately Group Technical Director, Westland Group plc. For services to the Helicopter Industry.
- David Alexander Blaikie, Chairman, Boys' Club of Scotland. For services to Young People.
- Howard David Blake, Composer. For services to Music.
- Jurat Peter Gilroy Blampied, President, Jersey Blind Society. For services to the community in Jersey.
- Michael Anthony Bloomfield. For political and public service.
- Jean Brewer (Miss Irvine), Chair, Women into Information Technology Foundation. For services to Information Technology.
- Colin David Brighton, Grade 7, Department of Employment.
- Major Nicholas Maclean-Bristol, Founder and Director, the Project Trust. For services to Education and to Overseas Development.
- Alan John Brooke. For voluntary and charitable services to the community in East Anglia.
- John Herbert Broom, DL, Chairman, Crosfield House Residential Home, the Royal British Legion.
- Dinah Browne, Member, Council for Nature Conservation and the Countryside. For services to Conservation.
- Richard Louis Brucciani, Chairman, Pal International Ltd. For services to the Protective Clothing Industry.
- Michael Bull. For services to the community in Tonbridge, Kent.
- Colin Burbage, Chairman, Post Office Board, Wales and the Marches.
- Dr. Pauline Buzzing, lately Co-ordinator, Teacher Recruitment Initiatives, West Sussex County Council. For services to Education.
- Major Cyril James Caines, MBE, TD, Vice President, Tyne and Wear Branch, Soldiers', Sailors' and Airmen's Families Association.
- William James Cameron, Director of Operations and Deputy Chief Executive, Northern Ireland Housing Executive.
- Professor Roy H. Campbell, Chairman, Scottish Records Advisory Council.
- Ernest James Southwell Cannings, Chief Probation Officer, Derbyshire Probation Service.
- John Anthony Carter, Chairman, Central Bureau for Educational Visits and Exchanges. For services to Education.
- James Hamish Clark, Chairman, North of Scotland Milk Marketing Board. For services to the Dairy Industry.
- Andrew Woodbury Clarke, Director, World Association of Nuclear Operators. For services to the Nuclear Industry.
- Kathleen Clarke, TD, QHS, Anaesthetist, British Red Cross Society. For services to Humanitarian Relief.
- Olive Clarke, MBE, DL. For services to the public and to the community in Cumbria.
- Professor Roland Clift, Professor of Environmental Technology and Director, Centre for Environmental Strategy, University of Surrey. For services to Science and Technology.
- Professor David Michael Conning, Director-General, British Nutrition Foundation. For services to Nutrition Education.
- John James Cooney, Grade 7, Her Majesty's Board of Customs and Excise.
- Ursula Ann Constance Corsellis. For services to the Court Interpreters Training Scheme and to Public Service Interpreter Training.
- Dilys Eleri Cossey, lately Chair, Family Planning Association. For services to Health Care.
- William Frank Cotton, City Engineer and Director of Transportation, Leeds City Council. For services to Local Government.
- Elizabeth Ann Crowther, Director of Social Services, Corporation of London.
- Horace Melvyn Crudge, Grade 7, Home Office.
- Christopher Paul Davies, Media Consultant and Journalist. For services to disabled people.
- Evan Trevor Davies, Chairman, Welsh Council of the National Farmers' Union. For services to Agriculture in Wales.
- Colonel Anthony Wilmer Davis, MBE, Comptroller and Secretary, Forces Help Society and Lord Roberts Workshops.
- Gerald Henry Dean. For political and public service.
- Navnit Dholakia, Principal Administration of Justice Officer, Commission for Racial Equality. For services to Race Relations.
- Christopher Neil Diggines, Senior Legal Assistant, Department of Social Security.
- Terence Robert Diggins, Grade 6, Her Majesty's Board of Inland Revenue.
- Brian Divers, Managing Director, UIE Scotland Ltd, Clydebank. For services to the Offshore Construction Industry.
- Peter Sidney Dodson, MBE. For political service.
- Margaret Elizabeth Douglas, lately Chief Political Adviser, British Broadcasting Corporation. For services to Broadcasting.
- Edward Arthur James Duller, Editor, Oxford Mail. For services to Journalism.
- John Ernest Dunford, Head, Durham Johnston Comprehensive School, Durham. For services to Education.
- Peter Bertram Ediss, Grade 7, Department of Health.
- John Aynsley Edmundson, Secretary, Joint Council for the General Certificate of Secondary Education. For services to Education.
- Major Alan John Edwards (Rtd.), lately Grade 7, Ministry of Defence.
- Philip John Edwards, Grade 6, Department of Education.
- Robert John Eglen, Grade 6, Her Majesty's Board of Inland Revenue.
- Philip John Elliott, Chairman, Advisory Committee on Justices of the Peace, West Bromwich. For services to the Judicial System.
- Michael Francis Emberton. For political and public service.
- William Walker Emerson, Member, Hartlepool Borough Council. For services to Local Government.
- Reg Empey, Lord Mayor of Belfast. For services to Local Government in Northern Ireland.
- William John English, Director of Finance, Glasgow District Council. For services to Local Government.
- Randall Evans Enoch, Headteacher, St. Margaret's Church of England High School, Liverpool. For services to Education.
- John Edward Everard, Deputy Surveyor, Forest of Dean, Forestry Commission.
- Edwin George Everett, Grade 6, Department of the Environment.
- David Christopher Fildes. For services to Financial Journalism.
- Hugh Findlay, Regional Sheriff Clerk, Scottish Court Service.
- Edwina Fletcher, Grade 7, Her Majesty's Board of Inland Revenue.
- Brian Howard Forster, Clerk to the Justices, East Gwent. For services to the Judicial System.
- Lieutenant Colonel George Forty (Rtd.), lately Curatorial Officer, Grade C, The Tank Museum.
- Ian Lovat Fraser, Chairman, Scottish Examination Board. For services to Education.
- Dr. Ray Gambell, Secretary, International Whaling Commission. For services to Whale Biology and Conservation.
- Alan William Gayton, Chairman, Advisory Committee on Justices of the Peace, Leicester. For services to the Judicial System.
- Cyril Gerber. For services to the Arts in Scotland.
- Frank Gibson, Member, Gravesham Borough and Kent County Councils. For services to Local Government.
- John Walter Gollop, Grade 7, Ministry of Defence.
- Adam Gray, Farmer. For services to Agriculture in Scotland.
- Michael Maxwell Gray, Chairman and Managing Director, McQueen Ltd. For services to Industry and to Public Life in the Borders, Scotland.
- Peter Anthony Greene, Honorary Chairman, Research Trust for Metabolic Diseases in Children. For charitable services.
- Major William John Martin Greener, DL, Chairman, Dorset Respite and Hospice Trust. For services to the community in Dorset.
- John Aled Griffiths, Member, EC Commission Poultry Advisory Committee. For services to the Egg Industry.
- Erich Gruenberg, Violinist. For services to Music.
- Peter Moir Guthrie, Partner, Scott Wilson Kirkpatrick and Partners. For services in the provision of Engineers in Disaster Relief.
- Christopher John Hampson, Headteacher, St. James's Church of England School, Bolton. For services to Education.
- Dr. John Fagen Handley, Executive Director, The Groundwork Trust, St. Helens Knowsley and Sefton. For services to Urban Regeneration.
- Norman Harry Harding, lately Member, Common Council, Corporation of London. For services to the Corporation of London.
- Geoffrey Harrington, Research Director, Meat and Livestock Commission. For services to the Meat Industry.
- Romaine Jennifer Hart, Managing Director, Bloom Theatres (Mainline Pictures). For services to the Film Industry.
- Andrew Gavin Hastings. For services to Rugby Union Football.
- Walter James Hedley, Principal, Inverness College. For services to Education.
- Graham John Hendry, Grade 7, Ministry of Defence.
- Peter Brian Hetherington, Deputy Secretary General, Association of Commonwealth Universities.
- Ronald Price Hickman. For services to Industrial Innovation.
- Alan Higgins, Grade 6, Her Majesty's Inspector of Schools, Welsh Office.
- Patrick William Gwynne Hodges, Principal Valuer, Valuation Office Agency.
- William Hogg, Grade 6, Home Office.
- Howard Morgan Holmes, Grade 7, Her Majesty's Board of Inland Revenue.
- John Howard, Grade 7, Crown Prosecution Service.
- Rosalind Patricia-Anne Howells, Vice Chair, London Voluntary Service Council. For voluntary services.
- Brian John Howes, President, Kimberly Clark's Service and Industrial Sector. For services to the Paper Products Industry.
- Dr. John Neville Phillips Hughes, Chairman, Professional Care Committee, Holme Tower Marie Curie Hospice, Penarth. For services to Medicine in Wales.
- Sheila Kathleen Hunter Jones, Chairman, Essex Branch, Soldiers', Sailors' and Airmen's Families Association.
- Ronnie Huntington, Director of Engineering and Operations, Wessex Water plc. For services to the Water Industry.
- Terence Ingham, Principal Inspector of Nuclear Installations, Health and Safety Executive.
- Alexander Lindsay Ingram, Procurator Fiscal, Scottish Crown Office.
- Norman Nathaniel Jacobs, ERD. For services to Sport.
- Alan Jefferson, International Marketing Director, British Tourist Authority. For services to Tourism.
- Derek John Johnson, Director of Iran Operations, International Military Services Ltd. For services to the Defence Industry.
- Maurice Victor Johnson, Chief Fire Officer, Oxfordshire Fire Service.
- Barrie Colin Johnston, Honorary Financial Adviser, Royal Marines.
- Professor George Weir Johnston, Honorary Professor of Surgery, Queen's University, Belfast, and Senior Consultant General Surgery, Royal Victoria Hospital, Belfast. For services to Medicine.
- Ifan Glyn Jones, Headteacher, Ysgol Y Gogarth, Llandudno. For services to Special Education in Wales.
- Dr. Ann Kendall, UK Director, the Cusichaca Trust. For services to Agricultural Development in Peru.
- Frederick Joseph Kenny, Assistant Regional General Manager, Trent Regional Health Authority. For services to Health Care.
- Dr. John Edward Arthur Kenrick, Chairman, Gwynedd Family Health Service Authority. For services to Health Care.
- Ian Eric King, Secretary and Legal Director to the London Transport Board. For services to Transport in London.
- Oliver Wissler Kingdon, DFC. For political and public service.
- Professor Eva Maria Kohner, Professor of Medical Ophthalmology, Hammersmith Hospital and Moorfields Eye Hospital, London. For services to Medicine.
- John Richard Lacey, lately Professional and Technology Superintending Grade, Ministry of Defence.
- Lionel Shaun Lambourne, Head of Paintings, Victoria and Albert Museum.
- The Reverend John Ernest Lane, Director and Secretary, St. Mungo Association. For services to the Homeless in London.
- Robert Peter Laurie, DL. For services to the community in Essex.
- Philip Andrew Laven, Controller Engineering Policy, BBC. For services to Broadcasting Engineering.
- Dr. Colin Lea, Grade 6, National Physical Laboratory, Department of Trade and Industry.
- Roger Leadbeter, Chief Executive, Blaenau Gwent Borough Council. For services to Local Government in Wales.
- Nigel Haywood Wilton Lee. For political service.
- Edward Leigh, Grade 7, Cabinet Office.
- Hugh Robert Lemmon, Grade 7, Foreign and Commonwealth Office.
- Arthur Gordon Lishman. For political service.
- Thomas Baden Llewellyn, Chairman, Econofreight Heavy Transport Ltd., and Member, Road Haulage Association National Council. For services to Road Transport.
- Nathaniel Lofthouse. For services to Association Football.
- John Luke, Grade 6, Her Majesty's Board of Customs and Excise.
- Ernest Lusty, Principal Engineer, Police Authority for Northern Ireland.
- Hamish John Mackenzie. For political service.
- David Laurence Magor, Assistant City Treasurer, Oxford City Council. For services to Local Government.
- Chrissie Maher, Founder Member and Director, Plain English Campaign.
- Kathleen Phyllis Makin, Grade 7, Ministry of Defence.
- Dr. Douglas Cunningham Malcolm, Convener, School of Forestry, Institute of Ecology and Resource Management, University of Edinburgh. For services to the Forestry Industry.
- Roger Manley, Fair Trading and Advice Officer, Cheshire County Council. For services to Consumer Protection.
- Gerald Cyril Manning, Chairman, National Association of Flood Defence Committees, and Chairman, South West Regional Flood Defence Committee, National Rivers Authority. For services to Flood Defence in the South West.
- Dr. Simon Nicholas Mardel, Doctor, World Health Organization. For humanitarian services in the former Yugoslavia.
- Dr. John Marks, lately Member, Schools Examination and Assessment Council, and former Member, National Curriculum Council. For services to Education.
- Evelyn Fairfax Martin, Member, Women's National Commission. For services to Women's Issues.
- Uryth Mathers, Life Vice-President, Royal British Legion, Scotland (Women's Section).
- John Eric Maund, Deputy Managing Director, Yamazaki Machine Tools UK Ltd. For services to the Machine Tool Industry.
- Ian Andrew McFadden. For services to the Fish Processing Industry.
- Francis McMath McGill, Chairman, McGill's Bus Services Ltd. For services to the Bus Industry.
- The Reverend William Henry McLaren. For services to the Church of England Guild of Vergers.
- James McMillan, Managing Director, Consafe Engineering (UK) Ltd. For services to the Offshore Engineering Industry.
- John Millar, Chairman, Livestock Marketing Commission for Northern Ireland. For services to Agriculture in Northern Ireland.
- Nanette Lilian Margaret Milne. For political and public service.
- Edward Mitchell, QPM, lately Acting Assistant Commissioner, Metropolitan Police.
- Hazel Joy Moate (Miss Skinner), Grade 7, Department of Transport.
- George Moore. For services to the public and to the community in South Yorkshire.
- Edith Morgan, Honorary Founder of European Regional Council, World Federation for Mental Health. For services to Mentally Ill People.
- The Reverend Robert Harman Morgan. For services to the community in South Glamorgan.
- Professor Peter Mortimore, Deputy Director, Institute of Education, University of London. For services to Education.
- Noel Richard David Mulligan, Chairman, Southern Education and Library Board, Northern Ireland. For services to Education.
- Professor Kenneth Albert Munday, Vice-Chairman, Dorset Health Authority. For services to Health Care.
- Dr. Gerard Thomas Murray, Principal Scientific Officer, Northern Ireland Office.
- Valerie Ann Nelson. For political service.
- Thomas Nicholson. Managing Director (Operations) British Aerospace Corporate Jets Ltd. For services to the Defence Industry.
- Edith Mary Pargeter, BEM, Writer. For services to Literature.
- Robert Griffiths Parry, President, Farmers' Union of Wales. For services to Agriculture in Wales.
- Edward Howell Perkins. For services to Agriculture in Wales.
- David Alexander Peters, General Manager, Borders Health Board. For services to Health Care.
- Kenneth Edwin John Peters, lately Chief Executive, National Federation of Retail Newsagents. For services to the Welfare of Newsagents.
- Donald Pleasence, Actor. For services to Drama.
- John Porteous. For services to the Royal Mint.
- Robert James Potter, Architect. For services to the Restoration of Historic Buildings.
- Dr. Robert James Price, President, British Sports Association for the Disabled. For services to sport for disabled people.
- Julian Hickman Proctor, Chairman, Sugar Beet Research and Education Committee. For services to Agriculture.
- Martin Richard Quirk. Chief Engineering Designer, Vosper Thornycroft (UK) Ltd. For services to the Defence Industry.
- Margaret Querida Rees, Grade 6, Department of the Environment.
- Hector William Robbie, Deputy Firemaster, Strathclyde Fire Brigade.
- Andrew Ogilvie Robertson, Secretary and Treasurer, Clydeside Federation of Community Based Housing Associations. For legal services to the Local Housing Movement.
- David Stewart Robinson, lately Chairman, Drainage Council. For services to Agriculture in Northern Ireland.
- Pamela Rogers, Grade 6, Department of Social Security.
- Margaret Frances Rook, Chief Nurse and Director of Quality, Airedale General Hospital, Yorkshire. For services to Health Care.
- Rosemary Anne Gravely Sanders-Rose. For political and public service.
- Jackie Rosenfeld. For charitable services to the Arts.
- Richard Alan Rosling, Special Adviser to the Prime Minister.
- Alexander J. Russell, TD, Member, Highland Regional Council. For services to Local Government and to the community in Newtonmore, Inverness-shire.
- Brigadier Henry Lionel Broome Salmon, Chairman, Oxfordshire Branch, Soldiers', Sailors' and Airmen's Families Association.
- Janice Saunders, Grade 7, Department of Employment.
- Jack Schofield, President, Manchester North Valuation Tribunal.
- Douglas Andrew Montagu Douglas Scott, Chief Executive, Cancer Relief Macmillan Fund. For services to Health Care.
- Dr. Kenneth Scott, General Medical Practitioner, Beckenham, Kent. For services to Medicine.
- The Reverend Thomas Hardy Scott. For services to Cancer Care in Scotland.
- John Sharp, lately Chairman, Independent Schools Joint Council. Accreditation, Review and Consultancy Service. For services to Education.
- The Very Reverend Jack Shearer, Dean of Belfast. For services to the community in Northern Ireland.
- Paul Douglas Sherlock, Technical Adviser (Emergencies), Oxfam. For services to humanitarian relief.
- Joan Elizabeth Shields. For services to education for Deaf-Blind Children.
- Rajkumar Sanayaima Singh, Consultant Otolaryngologist, Ayrshire and Arran Health Board. For services to Medicine.
- Valerie Singleton. For services to Broadcasting.
- Geoffrey Sleightholme, lately Grade 6, Office for Standards in Education.
- Sue Slipman, Director, National Council for One Parent Families.
- Barrie Edwin Smith. For services to City Regeneration and to Industrial Development in Sheffield.
- Barbara Mary Dimond Smith. For services to the Wages Councils.
- David Bruce Boyter Smith, Director and Chief Executive, Dunfermline Building Society. For services to Housing and to Public Life in Scotland.
- David Michael Smith. For political service.
- Michael Basil Smith, lately Headteacher, Filton High School, Bristol. For services to Education.
- Ronald Francis Smith, Grade 6, Ministry of Defence.
- Karen Smithies. For services to Ladies' Cricket.
- Professor Paul Samuel John Spencer, Head, Welsh School of Pharmacy, and former Dean, Faculty of Health and Life Sciences, University of Wales, Cardiff. For services to Science.
- Patricia Forrest Stevenson, Chairman, Tayside Children's Panel Advisory Committee. For services to Young People.
- Gwenda Margaret Etheridge Stewart. For services to the community in Cheshire.
- Noel Stewart, Regional Partner in Charge (Northern Ireland) Coopers and Lybrand. For services to Business in Northern Ireland.
- Michael John Storey. For political and public service.
- Robert Hardiman Graham Suggett, Principal, Warwickshire College of Agriculture. For services to Agricultural Education and to Conservation.
- Joyce Swepston, Chair, Board of Visitors, Her Majesty's Prison Woodhill. For services to Prison Visiting.
- Jimmy Tarbuck. For charitable services.
- David Heathcote Tatham, Group Trade Mark Agent, ICI. For services to Industry.
- Jean Taylor. For political and public service.
- Dr. John Michael Taylor, Director, Hewlett-Packard Laboratories Europe. For services to the Computing Industry.
- Barry Tester, Commercial Director, Insulating Components & Materials Ltd. For services to the Defence Industry.
- Gilbert Stanley Thomas. Founder of Peter's Savoury Products. For business and charitable services to the community in Wales.
- Hedley Saunders Thomas, Director, PW Management Consultancy Services. For services to Management Consultancy.
- Patricia Thompson, RD. Grade 7, Department of Economic Development, Northern Ireland Civil Service.
- Doctor Patricia Anne Tippett, Director, Blood Group Unit, Medical Research Council, London. For services to Science.
- Sam Toy, Chairman, UK 2000 Scotland. For services to Conservation.
- William James Tyson, Director of Planning and Promotion, Greater Manchester Passenger Transport Executive. For services to Transport in Manchester.
- Eric Arthur Waldron, Chairman, Advisory Committee on Justices of the Peace, Southampton. For services to the Judicial System.
- William Heap Walmsley, Grade 7, Department of Health.
- The Very Reverend Rhys Derrick Chamberlain Walters. For services to the community in Liverpool.
- Patricia Maud Warren. For political service.
- Captain John James Watson, Chairman, British Ports Association. For services to the Ports Industry.
- Pamela Waugh, lately Grade 6, Lord Chancellor's Department.
- Peter Abraham Weidenbaum, Founder and Member, Bolton and Bury Training and Enterprise Council. For services to Training.
- Alan Roy Wells, Director, Adult Literacy and Basic Skills Unit. For services to Adult Literacy.
- David Edgar White, Grade 7, Her Majesty's Board of Inland Revenue.
- Francis John Whitworth, lately Chairman, Merchant Navy Officers' Pension Fund Trustees.
- Dr. Peter David Wickens, Director and Board Member, Nissan Motor Manufacturing (UK) Ltd. For services to the Motor Industry.
- Geoffrey Stuart Wiggins, lately Veterinary Officer, Corporation of London. For services to Veterinary Medicine and to Public Health.
- Neil Keith Wilkie, Headmaster, Gairloch High School, Ross-shire. For services to Education.
- Gladys Joan Wilkinson, Chairman, Board of Visitors and Local Review Committee, Her Majesty's Young Offenders Institution, Dover. For services to Prison Board of Visitors.
- John Alan Williams, Vice-Chairman, Royal Automobile Club. For services to Motoring.
- Wyn Rees Williams, Principal, Hereward College of Further Education, Coventry. For services to Education.
- Professor Mark Herbert Williamson, Member, Advisory Committee on Releases to the Environment. For services to Environmental Protection.
- Alexander Wilson, lately Director, National Museum of Wales. For services to the Cultural Heritage of Wales.
- David Wynne, Sculptor. For services to Sculpture.
- Dr. Ronald Zeegen, Consultant Physician in General Medicine, Westminster Hospital, London. For services to Medicine.

Diplomatic Service and Overseas List

- Bryan John Baldwin. For services to British commercial interests in Thailand.
- Peter Thomas John Banner. For services to British commercial interests in Malaysia.
- Dr. Kenneth George Barrand. For medical services to the community in Northern Kenya.
- Joseph Walter Binns, lately Head of English Translation Unit, Commission of the European Communities.
- Francis William Blackwell. For services to the community in Hong Kong.
- Truman Murray Bodden. For service to the community in the Cayman Islands.
- Thomas Andrew Bull. For services to the British community in Portugal.
- Chan Wing-kee. For public service in Hong Kong.
- The Honourable Vincent Cheng Hoi-chuen, JP, Member of Legislative Council, Hong Kong.
- The Honourable Marvin Cheung Kin-tung, JP, Member of Legislative Council, Hong Kong.
- John Anthony Davies. For services to British commercial interests in South Africa.
- Michael Bushen Davies, lately International Atomic Energy Agency, Vienna.
- Ian de Stains. For services to British commercial and community interests in Japan.
- Patrick Brendan Mary Early, Director, British Council, Belgrade.
- Stephen Nicholas Evans, lately First Secretary, HM Embassy, Ankara.
- Fung Tung, JP, Director of Housing, Hong Kong.
- Garth Dunlop Harraway, Commissioner, Pitcairn Islands.
- William Lester Jackson-Houlston, lately First Secretary, HM Embassy, Belgrade.
- Eric Livesey Kelsick. For services to the community in Montserrat.
- Jerry Lam Chek-yuen, QFSM, CPM, JP, Director of Fire Services, Hong Kong.
- Alice Lam Lee Kiu-yue, JP. For services to the community in Hong Kong.
- Norman Leung Nai-pang, MBE, JP. For services to the community in Hong Kong.
- The Venerable John Lewis, lately Chancellor and Senior Canon, Brussels.
- David Andrew Lloyd, lately First Secretary, British Trade Office, Al-Khobar.
- George Durrant Lys, Tutor to HM The King of Swaziland.
- George Anthony McCarthy. For services to the community in the Cayman Islands.
- Henry McCrory, MBE, Deputy Governor, Anguilla.
- Rachel Ann Morgan (Mrs. Gudde). For services to British cultural interests in the Netherlands.
- David Neale Murray. For services to British commercial interests in Portugal.
- Kaye Wight Oliver, Chargé d'Affaires, Kinshasa.
- Leslie Thomas Phillips, Director British Council, Islamabad.
- Arthur Francis Powell. For services to the British community in Spain.
- Dennis Frederick Storer. For services to British commercial interests in Los Angeles.
- George Gordon Suckling. For services to the community in North West Zambia.
- Dr. Raymond Tudor Thomas, Director, European Community Liaison Office, British Council, Brussels.
- Gordon Ernest Tippell. For services to British commercial interests in California.
- Dessa Trevisan. For services to journalism.
- Philip Wong Kin-hang, MBE, JP. For services to the community in Hong Kong.
- Lieutenant Colonel David Neill Wright, MBE, lately on secondment to UNHCR in the former Republic of Yugoslavia.

==== Member of the Order of the British Empire (MBE) ====
Military Division

Royal Navy

- Local Major William David Hugh Baldwin, Royal Marines.
- Lieutenant Commander (SCC) Donald Bernard Briggs, Royal Naval Reserve.
- Warrant Officer Joseph Cooper.
- Acting Commander Michael Reginald D'Cruz.
- Warrant Officer John Frederick Earle.
- Marine Mark Antony Edwards, Royal Marines, P045659P.
- Lieutenant Commander William Frederick Edwards.
- Warrant Officer Robert Morris Evans.
- Temporary Lieutenant David Patrick Foley.
- Lieutenant Commander David John Griggs.
- Warrant Officer Richard Kenneth Hadfield.
- Lieutenant Commander John Hartley Hall.
- Lieutenant Commander David James Harris.
- Acting Commander David Andrew Hobbs.
- Chief Petty Officer (Operations) (Sonar) Peter William Joiner, D058666N.
- Chief Petty Officer Weapon Engineering Artificer Kenneth Edward Jones, Royal Naval Reserve, D985590X.
- Lieutenant Commander Roger George Knight.
- Lieutenant Commander Barry George Lee.
- Lieutenant Commander Raymond John Lodder.
- Lieutenant Keith Millen.
- Warrant Officer Alexander Moran.
- Warrant Officer Kevin Joseph Smythe Morrin.
- Warrant Officer (CAS) Thomas Ivan Newton.
- Lieutenant Commander Charles Lovell Noye.
- Sergeant David Lloyd O'Connor, Royal Marines, P037962R.
- Acting Charge Chief Marine Engineering Artificer (M) John Pounder, D137815H.
- The Reverend Scott Mackenzie Rae.
- Chief Petty Officer (Operations) (Weapon Analyst) Clare Bridget Saunders, W131408G.
- Local Major Simon Edward Shadbolt, Royal Marines.
- Leading Wren (METOC) Susan Mary Margaret Smith, W135200S.
- Chief Petty Officer Air Engineering Mechanic (WL) James Thomas Taylor, D107436X.
- Lieutenant Commander Roger James Warden.
- Chief Petty Officer Medical Assistant Steven Peter Way, D143708N.
- Lieutenant Andrew Welch.
- Warrant Officer Brian Edward Wines.

Army

- Major Adrian Amber (500582), The Light Infantry.
- 24271305 Sergeant Stephen James Baldwin, Royal Logistic Corps.
- Major Mark Patrick Banham (508135), Royal Regiment of Artillery.
- 24228095 Warrant Officer Class 1 Graham Robert Bannister, Royal Regiment of Artillery.
- Major Anthony Leslie Bateman (519486), Queen's Royal Lancers.
- 24168376 Corporal Karl Vladimir Bradbury, Corps of Royal Engineers.
- Captain James Henry Bridges (498592), The Staffordshire Regiment, Territorial Army.
- Captain Thomas Edward Broughton, BEM, (491608), Corps of Royal Engineers, Territorial Army.
- Major Michael George Brown (518744), Corps of Royal Electrical and Mechanical Engineers.
- Lieutenant Colonel Raymond William Burkey (462590), Royal Regiment of Artillery.
- 24179455 Warrant Officer Class 1 Robert Mostyn Cainan, Royal Logistic Corps.
- Lieutenant (Acting Captain) Richard Matthew Chattell (532092), Army Air Corps.
- 24184078 Warrant Officer Class 2 Stephen George Clark, The Gloucestershire Regiment.
- Captain (now Major) Paul John Cook (526166), Royal Regiment of Artillery.
- Major Paul Frank Copson (520956), The Parachute Regiment.
- Captain John Charles Henry Cross (488647), Corps of Royal Electrical and Mechanical Engineers, Territorial Army.
- LS23974010 Warrant Officer Class 1 Christopher Miles Crowden, 9th/12th Royal Lancers.
- Major Michael Ian Dolamore (507431), Royal Logistic Corps.
- Major James Redmond Donovan (521751), Royal Logistic Corps.
- 24278099 Warrant Officer Class 1 Richard Charles Drewett, Royal Regiment of Artillery.
- W0473598 Corporal Debbie Ann Driver, Adjutant General's Corps (SPS).
- Major Edward Erskine, TD, (516676), Corps of Royal Engineers, Territorial Army.
- 24288813 Warrant Officer Class 2 Edward Fannon, The King's Own Scottish Borderers.
- Major Frederick Fewster (521028), The Prince of Wales's Own Regiment of Yorkshire, Territorial Army.
- Major Reginald John Ford (513176), The Worcestershire and Sherwood Foresters Regiment.
- Major James Garven (508839), The Royal Highland Fusiliers.
- Major Anthony Stephen Revell Groves (522750), 6th Queen Elizabeth's Own Gurkha Rifles.
- 24361663 Warrant Officer Class 2 (Acting Warrant Officer Class 1) Alexander John Gullis, Royal Logistic Corps.
- 24390420 Staff Sergeant James Anthony Gurney, Royal Corps of Signals, Territorial Army.
- Major (Queen's Gurkha Officer) Haribahadur Gurung, MVO, (507666), 2nd King Edward VII's Own Gurkha Rifles.
- Major Derrick Harwood, TD, (507161), The London Regiment, Territorial Army.
- Captain Robert McGregor Henry (535128), The Black Watch.
- Captain (Acting Major) Andrew Hickling (530764), Royal Corps of Signals.
- 24212130 Warrant Officer Class 2 (Acting Warrant Officer Class 1) Lou Gordon Jones, Royal Logistic Corps.
- Major Robert Alexander David Kelly (523741), Irish Guards.
- Captain John William Kendall (535747), Royal Logistic Corps.
- Major William Donald Munro Levack (490391), Intelligence Corps.
- 24177109 Warrant Officer Class 2 Andrew Martin Lewis, Intelligence Corps.
- Major Martin Robert Lilley (501636), Royal Logistic Corps.
- Major Peter Ronald Littlewood (493744), The Gloucestershire Regiment.
- Lieutenant Colonel Denis Lockhart (461464), The Cheshire Regiment.
- LS23742363 Warrant Officer Class 1 Clifford Long, Queen's Royal Lancers.
- Major Peter Carl Luxton (514925), The Light Infantry.
- 24395554 Staff Sergeant David McLoughlin, Corps of Royal Electrical and Mechanical Engineers.
- Major Christine Helen Merrington-Rust (509772), Adjutant General's Corps (SPS).
- Major Robert Douglas Forbes Millington (503133), Royal Tank Regiment.
- Lieutenant (Acting Major) George Leslie Morrice (490423), Army Cadet Force, Territorial Army.
- 24344535 Warrant Officer Class 1 John Joseph O'Leary, Royal Army Medical Corps.
- Major Colin Lionel Pape (479318), The Devonshire and Dorset Regiment.
- Lieutenant (Acting Lieutenant Colonel) Philip Michael Parker (441213), Combined Cadet Force, Territorial Army.
- 23533244 Staff Sergeant (Local Warrant Officer Class 2) Ronald Victor Couch Pearce, Royal Logistic Corps, Territorial Army.
- 24449421 Staff Sergeant Martin John Porsch, Adjutant General's Corps (RMP).
- Captain Robert William Potter (531955), The Royal Anglian Regiment.
- Major Ernest Maurice Pringle (516395), Royal Army Medical Corps, Territorial Army.
- Major Alistair Lawson Reid (514876), The Royal Highland Fusiliers.
- 24145245 Warrant Officer Class 2 Richard Reuby, Corps of Royal Engineers, Territorial Army.
- Major (Acting Lieutenant Colonel) Ronald Alfred Rosenhead (518060), Adjutant General's Corps (SPS).
- Captain Robert Malcolm Sadler (527401), Royal Regiment of Artillery, Territorial Army.
- Major John Gordon Savelle (510149), Coldstream Guards.
- 22792521 Warrant Officer Class 2 (Acting Warrant Officer Class 1) Jack Seymour, Royal Logistic Corps, Territorial Army.
- 24116767 Warrant Officer Class 1 Huw Robert Smith, Adjutant General's Corps (SPS).
- Major Philip Alan Stack (511720), The Royal Regiment of Fusiliers.
- Major Robert William Stangroom (473521), Adjutant General's Corps (SPS).
- Major Donald Macdonald Steele (500406), Royal Corps of Signals.
- Major David James Lord Swann (514037), Queen's Royal Hussars.
- 24256921 Warrant Officer Class 1 Melvin Tazey, The Light Dragoons.
- 24520798 Sergeant (now Staff Sergeant) Stephen Paul Walton, Army Physical Training Corps.
- Lieutenant (Acting Major) Thomas David Watt (469335), Army Cadet Force, Territorial Army.
- Major Graham Christopher Watts (495253), Corps of Royal Engineers.
- Captain Desmond Webb (477337), The Royal Regiment of Wales, Territorial Army.
- 22849761 Warrant Officer Class 2 Robert Henry Webb, Army Physical Training Corps, Territorial Army.
- Major Chester White (513797), Royal Army Medical Corps, Territorial Army.
- 24156266 Warrant Officer Class 2 Robert Joseph Winstanley, Intelligence Corps.
- 24179312 Staff Sergeant John Stephen Wood, Corps of Royal Engineers.

Overseas Awards

- Corporal Chung Man-hung, Royal Hong Kong Regiment (The Volunteers).
- Captain Leung Chun-chung, Royal Hong Kong Regiment (The Volunteers).

Royal Air Force

- Flight Lieutenant (Acting Squadron Leader) David Leonard Ayers (8023972).
- Master Aircrew Christopher John Barnes (A0686959).
- Warrant Officer David John Batchelor (K8074933).
- Flight Lieutenant Frank David Belfield (5204377).
- Squadron Leader David John Caddick (5203679), RAF Regiment.
- Warrant Officer Maurice Sidney Coleman (V4185624), (Retired).
- Squadron Leader Irvine John Craig (2616104).
- Flight Lieutenant Liam Alexander Doherty (8024108).
- Squadron Leader Peter William Edwards (5202762).
- Master Aircrew Richard Gaglione, AFM, (F0686120).
- Corporal Theresa Gallagher (K8231410), Women's Royal Air Force.
- Squadron Leader Nicholas Jonathan Gordon (5203236).
- Chief Technician Kenneth Philip Gray (R8068614), (Retired).
- Warrant Officer David Ernest Green, BEM, (E0689073).
- Chief Technician Paul Stanley Gregory (S8069592).
- Flight Lieutenant Francis Matthew Haggerty (4231899).
- Warrant Officer John Grant Hobbs (L4260502).
- Squadron Leader John Franklyn Koran (0682133), (Retired).
- Squadron Leader Stephanie June Johnston (0009213), Women's Royal Air Force.
- Flight Sergeant Allan McAlpine Kerr (K8001991).
- Flight Sergeant Michael Kissane (G4262117), Royal Auxiliary Air Force.
- Reverend (Squadron Leader) Christopher William Long (5204923).
- Flight Sergeant Finlay Hugh MacLeod (A1946101).
- Flight Sergeant (now Warrant Officer) John Connon Macrae (D4287118).
- Warrant Officer Barry Anthony Martin (G0683518).
- Flight Sergeant Susan Elsie McTaggart (P8048198), Women's Royal Air Force.
- Flight Lieutenant Ross Thomson Mitchell (0211227), Royal Air Force Volunteer Reserve (Training).
- Flight Sergeant John Ivor Morris (M1942195).
- Squadron Leader Jeremy John Pook, DFC, (0608507).
- Warrant Officer Gareth Gwyn Roberts (P4187960).
- Warrant Officer John Michael Roffey (K8070205), RAF Regiment.
- Warrant Officer David Saunders (D4250948).
- Flight Sergeant William Norman Shanks (S4285151).
- Flight Lieutenant Frank Allen Strang (5205387).
- Squadron Leader John Anthony Tisbury (0687059).
- Flight Lieutenant Michael Wallis Topham (4182094).
- Squadron Leader Brian Edward Trace (8026905).
- Flight Lieutenant Robert James Webster (8116791), RAF Regiment.
- Squadron Leader John David West, AE, (2505685), Royal Air Force Volunteer Reserve (Retired).
- Warrant Officer Peter John Whitbourn (M1946129).
- Flight Sergeant Herold George Whittle (C8133975).
- Squadron Leader Basil Williamson (0207909), Royal Air Force Volunteer Reserve (Training) (Retired).
- Sergeant Nicholas Mark John Windsor (E8177064).
- Squadron Leader Michael Hardy Wood (4232821).

Overseas Awards

- Sergeant Chan Kwok-chung, Royal Hong Kong Auxiliary Air Force (Retired).
- Flight Sergeant Wong Kin-hung, Royal Hong Kong Auxiliary Air Force (Retired).

Civil Division

- Anthony Terrence Acton, Executive, Royal Mail Midlands Division, the Post Office and for services to children's charities and hospitals in Birmingham.
- Phyllis Madeleine Denison (Eleine) Adam. For services to charitable organisations.
- Seamus Francis Adams, Caretaker, University of Ulster, Coleraine, Northern Ireland. For services to Education.
- John Affleck. For services to the Leonard Cheshire Foundation.
- Margaret Alexander. For services to the Eastwood Women's Royal Voluntary Service.
- Patrick Watson Allen. For political service.
- Eva Anderson. For services to the Imperial Cancer Research Fund Shop, West Bridgford, Nottingham.
- Margaret Theresa (Marie) Annett, Caretaker, Lyric Players Theatre, Belfast. For services to the Arts.
- Moira Applegate, Personal Secretary, Health and Safety Executive.
- Jean Roberts Arm, Chairman, Friends of Halton Hospital, Middlesex. For services to Health Care.
- Norman Armstrong, Print Executive and Deputy Director, Her Majesty's Stationery Office.
- Margaret Monie Paton Arnold. For services to the Arthritis and Rheumatism Council, St. Albans.
- Vere Hugo Cholmondeley Arnold, Breeding and Research Director, British United Turkeys Ltd. For services to the Turkey Industry.
- Betty Ann Aston, Administrative Officer, Metropolitan Police.
- Derek Atkins, lately Clerk of Works, The All England Lawn Tennis and Croquet Club, Wimbledon.
- Ernest Auty, Secretary, Wakefield and District Branch. The Royal British Legion.
- Eileen Bailey. For services to Nursing in Mid-Glamorgan.
- Annie Baird. For services to the St. Andrew's Ambulance Association.
- Ian Baker, Sector Officer, Tamar Sector, Her Majesty's Coastguard.
- Dorothy Faith Baldock, Special Constable, Metropolitan Police.
- Joseph Gordon Balme, TD, Principal Engineer, Sir William Halcrow & Partners. For services to Road Transport.
- Nityananda Banerji, Senior Research Officer, Department of Employment.
- John Robert Barnard, Constable, Cleveland Constabulary.
- Arthur John Barrow, TD, President, Institute of Medical Laboratory Sciences. For services to Health in Wales.
- Irene Gladys Barsby, lately Higher Executive Officer, Ministry of Defence.
- Thomas Charles Barton, lately Senior Executive Officer, Lord Chancellor's Department.
- Veronica Agnes Bass, Administrative and Clerical Officer, Grade 4, North Devon District Hospital. For services to Health Care.
- Avery Albert James Beal, Volunteer Observer, Meteorological Office.
- John Harvey Beaton, Chairman and Managing Director, Kolfor Plant Ltd. For services to the Oil Industry.
- Betty Rebecca Bell. For services to the community in Havant, Hampshire.
- James Walter Bell, Support Grade Band 2, Courtkeeper, Lord Chancellor's Department.
- Isobel Bennett. For voluntary services to the community in Belfast.
- May Dorothy Berry. For services to the community, particularly the Citizen's Advice Bureau, in Bognor Regis, West Sussex.
- Roger Bexon, Technical Support Manager, Midlands Group, British Coal Corporation. For services to the community in Nottinghamshire.
- Margaret Georgina Biggs (Mrs. Bennett), District Dental Health Promotion Officer, Oxfordshire Health Authority. For services to Health Care.
- Marie Frances Ann Birch, Senior Nursing Officer, Wellcome Foundation Ltd. For services to Health Care.
- Richard Bird, Senior Generator Operator and Lighting Technician. For services to broadcasting.
- John Blackbourn, Industrial Grade Labourer, Her Majesty's Prison Gartree.
- Rosemary Blackman. For services to the community in Slindon, West Sussex.
- David Hartley Bland, Senior Executive Officer, Department of Health.
- Dorothy Patricia Blandford. For services to the Gloucestershire Blood Donor Service. British Red Cross Society.
- Julian Hurcombe-Blight, Chief Commandant, City of London Special Constabulary.
- Susan Marie Blyth, Administrative Officer, Chemical and Biological Establishment, Ministry of Defence.
- David Kennedy Boag. For political service.
- Theodora Boatemah, Project Director, Angell Town Community Project Ltd. For services to the community in Brixton.
- Thomas Ashley Cunningham-Boothe, For services to the British Korean Veteran's Association.
- Raymond Joseph George Bound, Skilled Tradesman, Dorset County Council. For services to Local Government.
- Robert Gilbert Bourne, lately Skilled Turner, Atomic Weapons Establishment, Cardiff. For services to the Defence Industry.
- Christine Frances Bowker, Executive Officer, Home Office.
- Richard David Bradford, Member, Torridge District Council. For services to Local Government.
- Robert Kevin Brady, Chairman, Housing Committee, Middlesbrough Council. For services to Local Government.
- Violet Brand, Adult Literacy Tutor Trainer. For services to Adult Literacy.
- Margaret Joy Brannen. For services to the Tynedale District Division, Northumberland Branch, Soldiers', Sailors' and Airmen's Families Association.
- Maria Brennan, Manager, Meadow House Hospice, Haling Hospital. For services to Health Care.
- Harry Henry Thomas Brind. For services to Cricket and to Groundsmanship.
- Anna Briody, Rector's Secretary, Holy Cross High School, Hamilton, Scotland. For services to Education.
- Graham Malcolm Brooks. For services to Journalism.
- Gladys Elizabeth Broomfield. For Voluntary services to the Morris Markowe Unit League of Friends, Springfield Hospital, Wandsworth.
- Maurice Brough. For services to the Derbyshire War Pensions Committee, the Royal British Legion.
- Colin William Broughton, Chairman, Nottinghamshire County, the Royal British Legion.
- Janet Brown, District Accounts Representative, West Midlands British Gas plc, and for services to the community in the West Midlands.
- Michael Anthony Brown, Chief Fire Officer, Powys Fire Service.
- Joyce Browne, Personal Secretary, Tyrone Crystal Ltd.
- Barry Browning, Chief Fire Officer, Esso Petroleum Company Ltd. For services to Industrial Fire Safety.
- Reginald George Browning. For services to the community and to Music in Somerset.
- Sybil Grace Browning. For services to the community in Bridgnorth, Shropshire.
- Maurice Bryant, Head Office Keeper, Serjeant at Arms Department, House of Commons.
- Stephen John Bryant, Chief Rent Officer. For services to the Rent Officer Service in Devon.
- James William Budge, Coxswain, Longhope Lifeboat, Royal National Lifeboat Institution.
- Brian William Burrel, Station Officer Retained, Cornwall County Fire Brigade.
- Denis Edward Burrell, lately Accounts Office Manager, T. G. Lilleyman & Son Ltd. For services to Industry.
- Norman Frederick George Burrows, Managing Director, Software Production Enterprises Ltd. For services to Industry.
- Patrick Joslyn Byrne, lately Revenue Assistant, Her Majesty's Board of Inland Revenue.
- John Anthony Cairns, Leading Firefighter, Strathclyde Fire Brigade.
- Frances Margaret Caldwell, Member, Management Board of St. Joseph's, County Armagh and Lisnevin Training Schools, County Down. For services to Education.
- June Ann Callaghan, Member, Ulster Council of the Girl Guides' Association]. For services to Young People.
- Major Anthony Achilles Camilleri, Assistant Secretary (Finance) for Greater London, Auxiliary and Volunteer Reserve Association.
- Alfred Camp. For services to the Crown & Manor Boys' Club, Hoxton, London.
- Arthur Campbell, Section Leader, Swan Hunter Shipbuilders. For services to the Shipbuilding Industry.
- Lynda Mary Cantor, Honorary Secretary and Trustee, British Retinitis Pigmentosa Society. For services to Health Care.
- Helen Galloway Cargill. For services to the Angus Multiple Sclerosis Society and for services to the community in Arbroath.
- Edna Carlsen. For voluntary services to the Singleton Hospital, Swansea.
- Henry Casey, Senior Analytical Chemist, Institute of Freshwater Ecology's River Laboratory. For services to Science.
- Jean Margaret Causton, Support Grade Manager 3, Overseas Development Administration.
- Victor Rowe Chamberlain, Quality Development Adviser, Community Unit, East Yorkshire Hospitals NHS Trust. For services to Health Care.
- Brian Chambers, Detective Sergeant, Royal Ulster Constabulary.
- Bernard Chi Chung Chan, Senior Executive Officer, Ministry of Defence.
- Fay Elizabeth Chaplin, Member, Daventry District Council. For services to Local Government.
- Robert James Chapman, Bailiff Manager, Southampton Bailiff Group, Lord Chancellor's Department.
- David John Chatterton, Managing Director, Chelsea Instruments Ltd. For services to the Engineering Industry.
- George William Christie. For services to the community in Fochabers, Morayshire.
- Percival William Clarke, Senior Craftsman, Silsoe Research Institute Agricultural and Food Research Council.
- William Robert Pritchard Clarke, TD. For services to the community in Radyr, Cardiff.
- James Griffith Cobley. For political service.
- Kenny Colaine. For services to sport for disabled people.
- Edward Gering Collier, lately Staff Port Naval Auxiliary Officer, Royal Naval Auxiliary Service Central Scotland (Forth).
- Marjorie Julia Collins, Chairperson, Multiple Sclerosis Society, Redbridge.
- Samuel John Collins, For services to the community in Wheathampstead, Hertfordshire.
- Audrey Lorina Tunnadine Cooper. For political and public service.
- Frank Edward Cooper, President, Barnsley Unit, Sea Cadet Corps.
- Dr. Peter Copeland, Chairman, Futuremedia plc. For services to Training in Industry.
- Francis Ernest Coulson, Director, Sharrow Bay Hotel, Penrith. For services to the Hotel Industry.
- Harold Henry James Cox, Vice Chairman of Governors, Hardwick Infants School, Derby. For services to Education.
- Marian Jane Cox. For services to mentally disabled people in South Wales.
- Edna Rosemary Craig, Senior Clerk, Larne Harbour Ltd.
- Elizabeth Winifred Craig. For political service.
- Peter Stewart Ferguson Crawford, Special Constabulary Sergeant, Tayside Police, and for services to charitable organisations.
- Roy Alan Crawford, Manufacturing Superintendent, Schering-Plough Ltd. For services to Industrial Health and Safety.
- George Crawforth, Farmer, and for services to the community in North Humberside.
- Raymond John Crawley, lately Assistant Director (Building), Bath City Council. For services to Local Government.
- John Creaby. For services to Race Relations in Tyne and Wear.
- Francis Gwendoline Teare Crellin, Patron and Founder Member, Manx Grand Prix Supporters Club. For services to the community in the Isle of Man.
- Dilys Elsie Crockett, Administrative Assistant, Ministry of Defence.
- John Somerville Brand Crombie. For services to the Scottish Society for the Mentally Handicapped.
- Jacqueline Rhona Crute, Personal Assistant to the Chief Executive, Rushmoor Borough Council, Hampshire. For services to Local Government.
- Margaret Anna Curry. For services to the Hillsborough Village and District Committee, Co. Down.
- Brian Patrick Edward Daly, Executive Officer, Ministry of Defence.
- Robert James Dalzell. For services to the community and to the Friends of Tower Hill Hospital Committee, Armagh.
- Harold Thomas Hewitt Daniels, Higher Executive Officer, Department of Social Security.
- James Davidson, Training Manager, Carlisle College, Cumbria. For services to Education.
- Moira Davidson, Revenue Executive, Her Majesty's Board of Inland Revenue.
- David Alexander Daves, lately Higher Telecommunications Technical Officer, Radiocommunications Agency.
- David William Thomas Davies, Signalling Maintenance Engineer, Regional Railways, British Railways. For services to the Rail Industry.
- Ronald Davies, Production Controller, Remploy Ltd., and for charitable services to the community in South Wales.
- William Davison, Station Officer, Tyne and Wear Fire Brigade.
- Freda Kathleen Dazeley, For services to the Hammersmith Hospital League of Friends.
- Ann Patricia de Jersey, Community Nursing Sister in Guernsey. For services to Health Care.
- Alan Robert Henry Dean. For services to the community in Dorset.
- John Charles Dean, Electrician, Atomic Weapons Establishment, Burghfield. For services to the Defence Industry.
- James Patrick Dickinson, lately Planning Engineer, British Steel plc. For services to the Steel Industry.
- John Spence Dickson, Assistant Divisional Officer, Tayside Fire Brigade.
- James Turpie Dickson, Pollution Control Officer, Shetland. For services to conservation.
- Richard Dillingham. For services to Sport in Bedfordshire.
- Michael John Docker, Joiner, Vosper Thornycroft (UK) Ltd. For services to the Shipbuilding Industry.
- Hilary Anne Cunliffe Dodd, Sales Planning Manager, Premier Beverages. For services to the Food Industry and to Humanitarian Relief in Romania.
- Michael Leslie Doleman, Works Supervisor (Contracts), Nottingham City Building Works. For services to Local Government.
- Desmond Done. For services to the Birmingham County, the Royal British Legion.
- Ronald George Douch, Works Manager, Royal Academy of Arts. For services to the Arts.
- Thelma Cavell Dowding. For services to the Great Yarmouth & Gorleston Ladies' Lifeboat Guild.
- Margaret Dowley, Secretary to the Assistant Chief Constable, British Transport Police.
- William Dryburgh. For services to the community and to the Scottish Old Age Pensioners Association in Alva, Clackmannanshire.
- Gerald Dunn, Licensed Taxi Driver, London and for services to the London Taxi Drivers' Fund for Under-Privileged Children.
- Elouise Edwards, Community Development Worker, Family Advice Centre, Moss Side People's Centre, Manchester. For services to the community in Manchester.
- Frederick Edwards, Ambulance Care Assistant, Mersey Regional Health Authority. For services to Health Care.
- Norah Elizabeth Edwards. For voluntary services to the Probation Service on the Isle of Wight.
- Peggy Elcombe, Fishmonger and for charitable services in Wiltshire.
- Thomas Kennedy Craig Elkin, Chief Ranger for the Mendip Hills.
- Basil Albert Elliott, Chief Superintendent, Royal Ulster Constabulary.
- Keith Arthur Elliott, Constable, Metropolitan Police.
- Hazel Margaret Ellis, lately Higher Executive Officer, Crown Estate Commissioners.
- Heather Ensor, Honorary Welfare Officer, Chesham and Amersham District Branch of the Multiple Sclerosis Society.
- Barbara Entwistle. For services to the Topsham Museum Society, Exeter.
- Elizabeth Janet Erskine. For services to the "Play in Scottish Hospitals".
- Alan Evans, Sergeant, Northumbria Police.
- Dorothy Bowden Evans, Administrator, Central Office, the Church in Wales. For charitable services.
- Gordon John Evans. For services to Music in Campbeltown, Argyll.
- Gwyn Caradog Evans, lately Higher Executive Officer, Forestry Commission.
- Jean Barbara Evans. For services to the Kidney Patients Association of North Wales.
- Morfudd Gwendolen Vaughan-Evans, Administrative Officer, Agricultural Development Advisory Service.
- Esme Jean Eyres, Senior Executive Officer, Welsh Office.
- Barbara Francis Fairweather, Founder and Manager, Glencoe & North Lorn Folk Museum. For services to the Arts.
- Eric William Harry Feakins, Chairman, London North War Pensions Committee.
- Errol Ainsley Ferguson, Production Supervisor, Radamec Group plc. For services to the Defence Industry.
- Josephine Mary Fields, Administrative Assistant, the Insolvency Service.
- Thomas Surphlis Fisher, Chairman, Erne Youth and Community Workshop, Enniskillen. For services to Education and Training.
- Pamela Diana Fletcher Jones. For services to the community in Kingston upon Thames, Surrey.
- Michael Ford, Day Centre Manager, Royal Earlswood, Redhill, Surrey. For services to Health Care.
- Nora Grace Ford, Deputy County Commissioner, County of Avon. St. John Ambulance Brigade.
- Phyllis Nancy Ford. For services to Cancer Relief and St. David's Hospice Appeal Fund, Gwynedd.
- Arthur Edward Foster, Academic Registrar, Nottingham Trent University. For services to Education.
- Margaret Sarah Foster. For services to the Cambridge Branch of CRUSE Bereavement Care.
- Dennis John Fraser. Managing Director, Grip House Ltd. For services to the Film and Television Industries.
- Margaret Camillus Fulton, Inspector of Taxes, Her Majesty's Board of Inland Revenue.
- Barbara Mary Garden. For political and public service.
- Amelia Jane Clark Gardner, Executive Officer, Department of Social Security.
- Graham Reginald Garner, Postman, Royal Mail London, Mount Pleasant, The Post Office and for services to sport for disabled people.
- Rita Eleanor Garry, Higher Executive Officer, Scottish Office.
- Elizabeth Jean Gatting, Personal Secretary, Department of Trade and Industry.
- Avril Joan Gee, Nursing Assistant, East Hertfordshire National Health Service Trust. For services to Health Care.
- John Gibbon. For services to the community in Salford.
- Lieutenant Colonel Charles Hugh Gibson, (Rtd.), Chairman, Southern Sea Fisheries Committee. For services to the Fisheries Industry.
- Thomas Gibson, Managing Director, Gibson Wells Engineering Ltd. For services to the Engineering Industry.
- John Kenneth MacLean Gilbert. For services to Consumer Affairs in Scotland.
- Peter James Gilder, District Surveyor, Corporation of London. For services to the City after the St. Mary Axe and Bishopsgate Bombings.
- Edward Stephen Giles. For political service.
- Margaret Gilfillan, Vice President, Architectural Heritage Society of Scotland. For services to Architecture.
- Steve Gilks, Projects Manager, Cash from Trash, Wakefield, Yorkshire. For services to Conservation and to charitable organisations.
- Ian Henderson Gilmour, Principal Teacher of History, Annan Academy, Dumfriesshire. For services to Education.
- Charles Edward Girdler. For services to the Currie Community Council, Midlothian.
- Peter Glover, Sub Officer Retained, Cleveland County Fire Brigade.
- William Finlay Gold, Senior Manager, Personnel and General Administration, NEC Semiconductors (UK) Ltd. For services to Industry.
- Dr. James Goldie, lately General Medical Practitioner, Cardross, Dunbartonshire. For services to Medicine.
- David John Golding, Chief Superintendent, Metropolitan Police.
- Raymond Eric Goodbold, Executive Officer, Ministry of Agriculture, Fisheries and Food.
- Joanna Goodchild, Assistant Secretary, Alyn and Deeside Division Soldiers', Sailors' and Airmen's Families Association.
- John Anthony Gorton, Production Supervisor, British Aerospace Defence Ltd. For services to the Defence Industry.
- Alexandrina Alice Grant. For services to the Scottish Ambulance Service Voluntary Car Service.
- Allan Edward Grant, Principal Officer, Her Majesty's Prison Aberdeen.
- Donald Grant. For services to Shinty.
- George Alexander Gray, lately Senior Professional and Technical Officer, Department of the Environment, Northern Ireland Civil Service.
- Margaret Doris Gray, Secretary to the Chief Probation Officer, Dorset.
- The Reverend Percy Gray, TD. For political and public service.
- Victor Gray. For services to Education and to the community.
- Alfred George Green, lately Journalist, Liverpool Echo. For services to Journalism and to the community in Liverpool.
- Lieutenant Commander David Richard Monro Gregory (Rtd.), Director, Margaret Blackwood Housing Association. For services to the Housing Association Movement.
- Ivy Muriel Gutridge. For services to the Inter Faith Movement in Wolverhampton.
- Albert Brian Haberfield. For services to the Steel Industry in Wales.
- Robert Haines. For services to the community in Caernarvon, Gwynedd.
- Idris George Hale, Founder and Director, Penscynor Wildlife Park, Cilfrew, West Glamorgan. For services to Tourism and Conservation.
- Pauline Margaret Halfpenny. For political and public service.
- Blodwen Hall. For services to the community in Donaghcloney and in particular to the Donaghcloney Housing Association Ltd, County Armagh.
- Eric Leslie Hall, Garage Workshop Supervisor, Leicestershire Constabulary.
- Norman Hall. For services to the community in Flamborough, Yorkshire.
- Rosemary Joan Hamilton, Administrative Officer, Department of the Environment, Northern Ireland Civil Service.
- John Anthony Hancock, Managing Director, Sealy United Kingdom. For services to Industry in Cumbria.
- Patricia Anne Hancocks, Senior Executive Officer, Ministry of Defence.
- Gordon Handley, lately Principal Prison Officer, Her Majesty's Prison Littlehey.
- Pamela Mary Hannam, Honorary Secretary, MENCAP, Bristol and Chairman, Avon County MENCAP Groups.
- Dorothy Hanson. For services to the Campaign for Tackling Acquired Deafness.
- Maurice Edward Stuart Harman, Chief Estate Surveyor, English Heritage.
- Kenneth Sydney Harris, lately Pedigree Secretary, British Pig Association. For services to the Pig Industry.
- Michael John Harris. For services to the Magistracy in Warwickshire.
- Anthony Michael Victor Carmel Harrison, Chief Petty Officer, Scarborough Unit, Sea Cadet Corps.
- Marian Harrison. For political service.
- Raymond Charles Hartill, Constable, South Wales Constabulary.
- Kenya George Malcolm Harvey, Warehouse Manager, Metković, Croatia. For services to Humanitarian Relief.
- Ethel Hayball. For services to the community in Mid Glamorgan.
- Jacqueline Patricia Hearn, Foster Mother, London Boroughs of Bexley and Tower Hamlets. For services to the Care of Young People.
- Frederick Ian Heeley, Warehouse Clerk, Felixstowe Dock and Railway Company, and for services to the community in Suffolk.
- Dylys Valerie Venner Helmore. For services to the Taunton Deane Women's Royal Voluntary Service.
- Ronald Albert Hendey, lately Chairman, Infant and Dietetic Foods Association. For services to the Food Industry.
- Archibald Henley, Coxswain, Bembridge Lifeboat, Royal National Lifeboat Institution.
- Colin Michael Henningway, Business Manager and Nurse Manager, Crawley and Horsham Health Care Trust. For services to Health Care.
- Herbert Ewart Henshall, Chairman, Executive Committee, Belfast Abbeyfield Society.
- Audrey Anne Herrington, Nurse Manager (X-Ray Department) Northern General Hospital National Health Service Trust, Sheffield. For services to Health Care.
- Derek Heselton. For services to the Salmon Fishing Industry.
- Edward Higham, lately Chairman, Magistrates' Courts Committee, Nottinghamshire. For services to the Judicial System.
- Kenneth Charles Hildrew, Station Officer, London Fire Brigade and for services to charitable organisations.
- Jean May Hogg. For services to the Borders Branch, Multiple Sclerosis Society.
- Minn Hogg, Editor, The World of Interiors. For services to the Fabrics and Furniture Industries.
- Edwina Jennifer Holden, Observer, Royal Air Force Bentley Priory, Royal Observer Corps.
- Margaret Anne Durdant-Hollamby For services to the community and to the Arts in Sevenoaks, Kent.
- Fergus John Joseph Holland, lately Deputy Principal, La Sainte Union College of Higher Education, Southampton. For services to Education.
- William Robert Holland, Chief Emergency Planning Officer, Merseyside Fire and Civil Defence Authority.
- Michael John Hollingsworth, Senior Engineer, British Aerospace Defence Dynamics Ltd. For services to the Defence Industry.
- William Eley Homer, Member, Dudley Metropolitan Borough Council. For services to Local Government.
- Christopher David Hopcroft, Engine Driver, Trainload Freight, British Railways, and for services to the safety of young people.
- Professor Charles Hugh Wilson Horne, Chairman and Managing Director, Novocastra Laboratories Ltd. For services to Science and to Export.
- Winnie Horton. For services to the community in Edgbaston, Birmingham.
- Margaret Joan Houghton, lately Support Manager 2, Serious Fraud Office.
- Edwin Howarth, Honorary Secretary and Honorary Treasurer, Engineering Council, Devon and Cornwall. For services to Engineering.
- Winifred Alma Jean Howe. For services to the Somerset Branch, British Red Cross Society.
- David John Howell, Sergeant, West Yorkshire Police.
- Stanley Thomas Hudson. For political and public service.
- Hugh Kenneth Hughes, DFC, AE, Founder and Chairman, Aerocontracts Ltd. For services to the Civil Aviation Industry.
- Charles Hullighan. For services to the community in Yorkshire.
- Tudwal Jones Humphreys, Voluntary Hospital Visitor, Gwynedd.
- Robert Henry Humphries, Superintendent Engineer, Stranmillis College, Belfast. For services to Education.
- Ralph Edwin Hunte, Consultant, Prison Officer Selection Board.
- Mary Hunter, Classroom Assistant and Bus Escort, Killadeas Special School, County Fermanagh.
- Morven Anne Hutchison, Personal Assistant to the Director-General, Canning House. For services to International Relations.
- Joan Rose Huth, lately Administrative Officer, Ministry of Defence.
- Dennis George Huxtable, First Deputy Principal, Itchen College, Southampton. For services to Education.
- George Alexander Inglis, Chairman, Scot-West Training Services Ltd. For services to Youth Training.
- John Ireland, Force Communications Manager, Bedfordshire Police.
- Hilda Ives. For services to the public and to the community in Hedon, Hull.
- Fred Clive Jackson, Chairman, Triumph Business Systems (South Wales) Ltd. For services to the Office Furniture Industry.
- Richard Smith Jackson, Founder and Chairman, Rescare, National Society for Mentally Handicapped People in Residential Care.
- Derek Rhys James, Basic Craftsman, Defence Research Agency, Ministry of Defence.
- Alan Edward Jeffreys, Sub-Librarian, University of Newcastle upon Tyne. For services to Book Cataloguing.
- Thomas Ronald John Jenkins, Supervisor, Regional Railways, British Railways, and for services to the community in Whitland, Dyfed.
- Muriel Jennings, Organiser, RSVP in Kent. For services to the community in Kent.
- Glynne Thomas Jerman, Forest Craftsman, Forestry Commission.
- Mary Johnston. For services to the community in Tranent, East Lothian.
- John Griffith Jones, Senior Professional and Technology Officer, Ministry of Defence.
- Kathleen Elizabeth Jones. For services to the Women's Royal Voluntary Service in Wales.
- Paul Anthony Jones, Higher Executive Officer, Companies House Executive Agency.
- Audrey May Joy, Senior Prison Officer, Her Majesty's Prison and Young Offenders' Institution East Sutton Park.
- Elizabeth Marian Keating, Managing Director, Heirlooms Ltd. For services to Export and to the Linen Industry.
- Anna Josephine Bernadette Kelly, Administrative Officer, Department of Agriculture, Northern Ireland Civil Service.
- Robert Thomas Kemp, Coxswain, Walton & Frinton Lifeboat, Royal National Lifeboat Institution.
- Bridget Kendall, Moscow Correspondent, British Broadcasting Corporation Radio. For services to Broadcasting.
- Diana Frances Kennedy, Administrative Officer, Ministry of Defence.
- Agnes Kerr, Music Tutor, Her Majesty's Prison, Shotts.
- May Kilroy. For services to Swimming and the community in Royton, Oldham.
- Mary Watson King. For services to the Selsey Women's Royal Voluntary Service.
- Gordon Kitto. For services to the Brass Band Movement.
- Ronald George Knight, Grants Secretary, Women's Royal Voluntary Service.
- Ron Koffler, Chairman and Managing Director, Galatrek International Ltd. For services to the Computer Industry in North Wales.
- Lazo Koncar. Former Chairman, Central London Dial-a-Ride. For services to disabled people.
- James Frederick Lacey. For political service.
- Valerie Mary Laidler, lately County Road Safety Officer, Northumberland County Council.
- John Joseph Lane, Mooring Master, Ranworth Staithe, Norfolk Broads.
- Rodney James Lane, Assistant Divisional Officer, Devon Fire and Rescue Service.
- Robin John Lattimore, Field Worker, Social Work Department, Grampian Regional Council.
- Robert Lauchlan. For services to the community in Kilwinning, Ayreshire.
- Margaret Elizabeth Lee, Secretary, Crohn's in Childhood Research Association. For services to Health Care.
- Georgina Ivy Katterina Legerton, Member, Kingston Hospital Special Trusts Fund Panel, Surrey. For services to Health Care.
- Jim Legg, lately Welfare Controller, Westland Helicopters Ltd. For services to the Helicopter Industry.
- James Gerrard Leggett, lately Senior Instructional Officer, Ministry of Defence.
- John Eric Lewis. For services to disabled people in South Wales.
- Veronica Lewis, Director, Cheshire Dance Workshop. For services to Dance.
- William Buchanan Lindsay, lately Estate Worker, Scottish Natural Heritage. For services to Environmental Protection.
- Brian Little, Higher Professional and Technology Officer, Department of Transport.
- Betsy McLarty Loch, Administrative Officer, Scottish Office.
- Oonagh Emily Lockwood, Pensions Administrator, NT Transport Holding Company. For services to the Transport Industry.
- Michael Godfrey Lombard, Leading Firefighter Retained, Hampshire Fire Brigade.
- Hazel Joan Long, Personal Secretary, Ministry of Defence.
- Kenneth William Looseley. For services to Sport and to the St. John Ambulance Brigade.
- Pamela Love, Divisional Superintendent, Walton and District Quadrilateral Division, St. John Ambulance Brigade.
- Margaret Shan Luck, Chief Executive, Advanced Training Associates. For services to Training in the South West.
- Iris Ellen Edith Ludgate, Administrative Officer, Companies House Executive Agency.
- David James Lythgoe, Loco Electrician, Wistow Mine, British Coal Corporation. For services to the Coal Industry.
- Gary Vincent Mabbutt. For services to Association Football.
- Elizabeth Ann Kathleen Jenkins MacAskill, Member, Western Isles Islands Council. For services to Local Government.
- Jean Macdonald, Senior Nurse, Special Care Baby Unit, Wycombe General Hospital, Buckinghamshire. For services to Health Care.
- Jimmie MacGregor. For services to Scottish Culture and Heritage.
- Ronald William MacGregor, Estate Gamekeeper and Stalker, Atholl Estates. For services to Scottish Rural Life.
- Robert John Mackay, Deputy Engineer in Chief, Northern Lighthouse Board. For services to Safety at Sea.
- Ronald MacKellaig. For services to the Glenfinnan Monument, National Trust for Scotland.
- Jean Helen Mackenzie, lately Senior Personal Secretary, Ministry of Defence.
- Kenneth Mackenzie. For services to the Search and Rescue Dog Association.
- Ian Mackinnon, Farm Manager, Straithaird Estate, Isle of Skye. For services to Agriculture.
- Moira Maclean. For services to Scottish Forum on Prisons and Families.
- Stella Dorothy Clayton MacRae. For services to the British Red Cross Society, Isle of Arran.
- Ann Christine MacTaggart, Executive Officer, Department of Employment.
- James Main, lately Director of Estates, University of Aberdeen. For services to Education.
- Robert Parnell Mandeville, General Medical Practitioner, Glasgow. For services to Medicine.
- Clifford H. Manning. For services to the Civil Service Benevolent Fund.
- Michael Llewellyn James Marsh, lately Deputy Head, Safety Data and Analysis Unit, Safety Regulations Group, Civil Aviation Authority. For services to Air Transport.
- Harold Martin, Bailiff Manager, Nottingham Bailiff Group, Lord Chancellor's Department.
- Hamilton Martin, Director, Northern Ireland Trade Associations Limited. For services to the Agricultural Industry.
- Richard Currie Martin, Support Grade Band 1 (Driver and Courier), British Council.
- Stephen Alexander Martin. For services to Hockey.
- Marguerite Joyce Masterton, Secretary, Lancashire Branch and Preston Division, Soldiers' Sailors' and Airmen's Families Association.
- Dr. David Finlay-Maxwell. For services to the Royal National Institute for the Blind's Talking Book Service.
- Phyllis Maycock, Bus Conductress, Charlton-on-Otmoor Services. For services to the Bus Industry.
- David Smith McAdam, Overseas Development Senior Logistics Specialist. For services to Humanitarian Relief in the former Republic of Yugoslavia.
- Ronald Carruthers McBain. For services to the North West North War Pensions Committee.
- Evelyn McCain, Secretary, Northumbria County St. John Ambulance Brigade.
- Patrick Leo McCarthy, Bus Shunter, Citybus, and for charitable services to the community in Belfast.
- William Ronald McConnell, Reserve Constable, Royal Ulster Constabulary.
- Josephine McCormick, Pool Attendant, Cumbernauld High School. For services to Education.
- Ellen Gardner Bishop McCulloch. For services to the Livingston Disabled Persons Club, West Lothian.
- Peter Frederick McCulloch, Chairman and Managing Director, Quatro Biosystems Ltd. For services to Science and to Industry.
- Robert William McDonald. For services to the community in Migvie, Aberdeenshire.
- Aileen McGilton. For services to the Down's Syndrome Association in Northern Ireland.
- Ian McGregor. For political and public service.
- James Skene (Hamish) Mckay, Shepherd, John Fairlie & Sons. For services to the Sheep Industry.
- Desmond McKee, Nursing Auxiliary, Lagan Valley Hospital, Lisburn, Northern Ireland. For services to Health Care.
- John McNiven, Fitter, Regional Railways, British Railways, and for services to Weightlifting in Scotland.
- Colin John McRobert, Maintenance Manager, Sewage Treatment Provinces, Thames Water plc. For services to the Water Industry.
- Barbara Gilmour McRury, Senior Dental Surgery Assistant (Patients with Special Needs), Lothian Health Board. For services to Dental Health Care.
- Lorna Milne McWilliam, Banqueting Administrator, House of Lords.
- Marian McWilliams. For political and public service.
- Edna Margaret Meekin, Personnel and Training Officer, CV Home Furnishing Ltd. and for services to the community in Randalstown, Northern Ireland.
- Donald Alexander Michael, Principal Lightkeeper, Corsewall Lighthouse, Stranraer.
- Thomas William Middleton, Firefighter, London Fire Brigade.
- Christopher Robin Millard, Sergeant, Metropolitan Police.
- Geoffrey Edward Mills, Watch Officer, Thames Maritime Rescue Sub Centre, Her Majesty's Coastguard.
- Elizabeth Amelia Forbes Mitchell. For services to disabled people in Fife.
- Doreen Monkman. For services to the Women's Royal Voluntary Service Darby and Joan Club in Burton Pidsea, North Humberside.
- Walter Harold Moody, lately Chargehand Motor Transport Driver, HMS Dryad.
- Kathryn Elizabeth Moor, Chair, Northumbria Probation Committee.
- Gillian Moore, Head of Education, South Bank Centre. For services to Music and Education.
- Geoffrey Alan Moor, Museum Support Grade 3, Royal Air Force Museum, Hendon.
- Audrey Martha Bateman-Morris. For services to the community and Parish of Llanelli, (St. Albans Church).
- Eileen Morrison, Personnel Officer (Pensions), British Nuclear Fuels plc. For services to the Nuclear Industry.
- William John Morrison, Detective Constable, Royal Ulster Constabulary.
- Edward Robert Mortlock, Process and General Supervisory Grade E, Chemical and Biological Defence Establishment, Ministry of Defence.
- Ellanora Moseley. For political service.
- Frederick Kenneth Moulton, Sub Officer Retained, Dyfed County Fire Brigade.
- Maura Maeve Mulholland, Member, Women Together for Peace. For services to the community in Northern Ireland.
- Anthony Christopher Mullins, Chairman, Midlands Regional Committee, Duke of Edinburgh's Award Scheme.
- Athol Hollins Murray, Chairman, Barromore Village Settlement. For services to disabled people.
- Peter Innes Murray, Coxswain, Anstruther Lifeboat, Royal National Lifeboat Institution.
- Patrick Joseph Murray, Sub Officer, Newtownhamilton Fire Station, South Amargh.
- Reginald Frederick Mutimer, Senior Graphics Officer, Ministry of Defence.
- Dr. David Nachshen, Chairman, Standing Joint Committee for Family Practitioner Committee, and Member, Local Medical Committee. For services to Medicine.
- Keith Naylor, Personnel Administrator and Head of Security, Cammell Laird Shipbuilders Ltd. For services to the Shipbuilding Industry.
- Mary Clare Neiland, Clinical Services Manager (Theatres), Chelsea and Westminster Hospital and Charing Cross Hospital, London. For services to Health Care.
- Carl Handal Nelson, Local Officer I, Department of Social Security.
- Peter Newsome. For services to the community in Skegness.
- Peter Bulstrode Nichols, Higher Executive Officer, Rutherford Appleton Laboratory, Science and Engineering Research Council.
- Edith Sybil Noad, Catering Supervisor, Knightstone Housing Association, Weston-super-Mare. For services to the Housing Association Movement.
- Kathleen Mary Noott, Secretary, Haverfordwest Branch, MENCAP Society.
- James William Noren. For voluntary services to the Southport Hospitals, Merseyside.
- Jean Constance Norton, Member, Chelmsford Borough Council. For services to the community in Essex.
- Lewis James Nurse, lately Curator Grade G, National Maritime Museum Library.
- Captain Hugh O'Byrne, Harbour Master, Belfast.
- James Anthony O'Farrell. For political service.
- Anne O'Hara, Member, Management Committee of the Northern Ireland Co-Ownership Housing Association, and Member, Northern Ireland Federation of Housing Associations. For services to the Housing Association Movement.
- John O'Keeffe, Senior Executive Officer, Her Majesty's Board of Customs and Excise.
- Peter O'Rouke, Coaching Manager, London Buses Ltd. For services to Transport in London.
- Alan George Oakley, Constable, Staffordshire Police.
- Douglas James Oakley, Deputy Manager, Stoke-on-Trent Technical College Techshop. For services to Youth Training.
- George Stephen Oliver, Senior Executive Officer, Department for Education.
- Michael Frank Owen, Customer Services Manager, British Telecommunications plc. For services to the Telecommunications Industry.
- John Winston Owens, Aircraft Fitter, British Aerospace Defence Ltd. For services to the Defence Industry.
- Rex Palmer, Technical Director, Trucast Ltd. For services to the Defence Industry.
- Bernard Peter Parsons, Chief Petty Officer, Brentwood Unit, Sea Cadet Corps.
- Frank Pashley. For services to the Forestry Industry.
- Catherine Babonau Patrick. For services to disabled people in Glasgow.
- Peter Michael Pawsey, lately Senior Executive Officer, Home Office.
- Robert Geoffrey Paxman, Managing Director, Paxman Musical Instruments Ltd. For services to Music.
- David Arthur Payne, Higher Executive Officer, Department of the Environment.
- Osman Parker Pearce, Chairman, Social Security and Disability Appeal Tribunals.
- Gordon Peirson, Auxiliary Coastguard in Charge, Skinningrove, Cleveland.
- James Leonard Pell, lately Custody Guard, Department of the Environment.
- Antony John Penlington, lately Executive Officer, Department of Employment.
- Hilda Mary Petts. For services to the community in Selsey, Chichester.
- Graham James Phillips, lately Diocesan Secretary, Winchester, Hampshire.
- Rupert Phillips, Overseas Development Administration Convoy Operations Manager. For services to Humanitarian Relief in the former Republic of Yugoslavia.
- Barbara Pickering, Personal Secretary, Ministry of Defence.
- Marion Platt, Member, Newcastle-under-Lyme Borough Council. For services to Local Government.
- Homer Churchill Plummer. For services to the community, particularly Race Relations, in Wolverhampton.
- Rosalyn Llewellyn Portsmouth, Administrative Officer, Ministry of Defence.
- James Trevor Powell, Constable, West Midlands Police.
- John Alfred Pulford, Chairman, Community Service Volunteers. For voluntary service.
- Roy Purdy, Face Worker, Silverwood Colliery, British Coal Corporation. For services to the Coal Industry.
- Anthony Chetwynd Purefoy. For political service.
- John Richard Purkess. For services to the Independent Grocers' Movement.
- Stephen Ernest Radford, Site Sergeant, Rolls-Royce plc. For services to the Aircraft Industry.
- William Eric Rainey, Member, Probation Board for Northern Ireland.
- Claude Dudley Ramsey. For services to the Greenwich Race and Health Project, London and for services to the community in Paddington, Southwark and Thamesmead.
- Derek James Ransome, Road Safety Officer, Corporation of London.
- Jean Margaret Evelyn Ransome, Road Safety Officer, Royal Borough of Kensington and Chelsea.
- William Thomas Kinsey Raw Rees. For services to Agriculture and to the community in Wales.
- Walter Eric Charles Real, QPM, Deputy President and Trustee, Lancashire Branch, British Red Cross Society.
- Lorna Rees. For services to the community in Pontardulais, West Glamorgan.
- Margaret Rita Rees, Senior Co-ordinator, Headway House, Bristol.
- Mary Douglas Rees, Chairman's Lady, West Lancashire District Council.
- Patricia Beatrice Reeves, Nursing Auxiliary, Weymouth and District Hospital. For services to Health Care.
- Samuel Reid, Caretaker, Edwards Primary School, Castlederg, Northern Ireland. For services to Education.
- John Charles Rice. For services to Athletics in Liverpool.
- Louisa Elizabeth Stiven Rigby. For services to the Silloth and District Branch, Royal National Lifeboat Institution.
- Patricia Roberts, President, Welsh Ladies' Golf Union. For services to Golf.
- Alan Robson, Broadcaster, Metro Radio, Newcastle. For services to Broadcasting.
- Dr. Peter William Rock, Chairman of Governors, Tudor Grange School, Solihull. For services to Education.
- William Rodger. For services to the community in Bo'ness, West Lothian.
- Carol Anne Rodgers, Registration Supervisor, Prescription Pricing Authority.
- James Leslie Rogers, lately Senior Professional and Technology Officer, Property Services Agency Service.
- Sylvia Rogers, Administrative Officer, Ministry of Defence.
- Albert Victor Rolph, Technical Officer, British Telecommunications plc. For services to the Telecommunications Industry.
- Richard Roper, Chief Attendant, Museum of Science and Industry, Manchester. For services to Museum Management.
- Susan Margaret Rorstad, Chairman and Managing Director, Poppies (UK) Ltd. For services to Domestic Care Provision.
- John Roseman, Co-ordinator, Rural Schools' Education Support Grant Programme. For services to Education.
- Margaret Rosie, Community Psychiatric Nurse, Aberdeen. For services to Health Care.
- Gwynneth Watkin Ross, Honorary Secretary, Psychiatric Rehabilitation Association.
- Inez Routledge, Headteacher, Reedham Park School, Purley, Surrey. For services to Education.
- Anne Louise Rowe, Personal Assistant to the Chief Executive, Cheshire County Council. For services to Local Government.
- Dr. Christopher Merlin Rowlands, Auxiliary Coastguard, Shetland.
- Doris Annie Rowley, lately Administrative Officer, Foreign and Commonwealth Office.
- Philip Edgar Rundle. For services to the Association of Cornish Boys Clubs and to the community in Saltash, Cornwall.
- Walter John Ryman, Farmer, For services to Agriculture and to the community in Staffordshire.
- Brian George Sack, Director, Sharrow Bay Hotel, Penrith. For services to the Hotel Industry.
- Robert Ian Sandilands, lately Deputy Chief Executive, National Farmers' Union of Scotland.
- Michael John Joseph Sands, Signalman, Northern Ireland Railways. For services to the Rail Industry.
- Deborah Sayers, Import/Export Specialist, Lucas Aerospace. For services to the Defence Industry.
- Norman Scarfe. For services to the history and culture of Suffolk.
- Joy Scarlett, Administrative Officer, Department of Employment.
- Margaret Schofield, Higher Executive Officer, Her Majesty's Board of Customs and Excise.
- Lily Andrew Gilmour Scollon, Personal Secretary, Advisory, Conciliation and Arbitration Service.
- Dr. Keith Taylor Scott, Professional and Management Grade 1, AEA Technology. For services to Industry.
- Thomas James Evan Scott, Senior Professional and Technical Officer, Northern Ireland Office.
- Sarup Singh Seehra. For services to the community in High Wycombe.
- David Peter Senior, Founder Director, Art for Health Centre, Manchester, For services to the Arts and Architecture.
- Anthony George Severine, Bus Conductor, London Central Bus Company Ltd, Peckham. For services to the Bus Industry.
- Frederick Leonard Shepheard, Associate, Bullen & Partners, Durham. For services to Road Engineering.
- George Ian Silver, Senior Officer, Her Majesty's Prison Shotts.
- Gillian Shelia Simon, Assistant Honorary Secretary, British Sportsman's Club. For services to Sport.
- David Simpson, Purchasing Accountant, Yarrow Shipbuilders plc. For services to the Shipbuilding Industry.
- James Geddes Wilson Simpson, Worker Manager, and Grieve, Rosefarm, Cromarty. For services to Agriculture.
- Malcolm Simpson, Local Officer I, Department of Social Security.
- Sheila Mary Skellon, Revenue Executive, Her Majesty's Board of Inland Revenue.
- Dr. Eric Sklar, General Medical Practitioner, Brent, London. For services to Medicine.
- Beatrice Lorna Burnham-Slipper. For services to the Save the Children Fund in Hampshire.
- Doreen Elizabeth Sloper, Clerk, Shillingstone Parish Council, Blandford Forum, Dorset. For services to Local Government.
- Anna Smith, Headteacher, Our Holy Redeemer's Primary School, Clydebank. For services to Education.
- David Frederick Smith, European Community Consultant, Merseyside Local Authorities.
- David Henry Smith, Customer Services Representative, Anglian Water plc and for services to the community in Humberside.
- Joyce Eva Smith, Secretary, Surrey Flora Committee. For services to the Environment in South East England.
- Judith Ann Smith, Senior Traffic Warden, West Yorkshire Police.
- Ronald Smith, Senior Executive Officer, Her Majesty's Board of Customs and Excise.
- Rosalind Steele. For services to the Women's Royal Voluntary Service Golden Year Club, Langley, and to the local Blood Donor Service.
- James Dawson Stelfox, Leader, First Irish Everest Expedition. For services to Mountaineering.
- Rebecca Lucy Stephens. For services to Mountaineering.
- Michael John Stephenson, Managing Director, Helena Laboratories (UK) Ltd. For services to Export.
- Elizabeth MacFarlane Stevenson, Chairperson, Govanhill Housing Association Ltd.
- Mavis Stevenson, Shift Supervisor, Somerset College of Arts and Technology. For services to Education.
- Joan Elizabeth Clements Stoddart, Deputy Principal, Department of Health and Social Services, Northern Ireland Civil Service.
- Rodney Howard Stone, lately Deputy Head, the Judd School, Tonbridge, Kent. For services to Education.
- John Streets. For services to Music.
- Patrick John Sullivan. For political service.
- Margaret Norah Sumnall, County Food Organiser, Luncheon Clubs and Meals-on-Wheels, Staffordshire. For services to the community in Staffordshire.
- Margaret Summer, Chair, Stoops and Harger Clough Estates Management Board Steering Committee. For services to the community in Burnley.
- Aileen Dorothy Irene Sweeting. For services to the Isle of Man Branch, Soldiers', Sailors' and Airmen's Families Association.
- David Harold John Symons, Chairman, the Horizon Club, Exeter. For services to Special Needs Education.
- Marlene Joan Mary Symons, Revenue Executive, Her Majesty's Board of Inland Revenue.
- Geoffrey Owen Taylor, Consultant in Dental Public Health, West Pennine Health Authority and North Western Regional Health Authority. For services to the Dental Profession.
- Janet Taylor, Charge Nurse, Craig Phadrig Hospital, Inverness. For services to Health Care.
- Kenneth Taylor, Sector Officer, Eyemouth Sector, Her Majesty's Coastguard.
- Phillip Brian Taylor. For political and public service.
- Patience Elizabeth Florita Thesiger, TD. For services to the community in Kent.
- David Desmond Thomas, Director, Foothold. For services to Youth and Business in Llanelli.
- John Brian Thompson, Headteacher, Darrell Primary School, Richmond, Surrey. For services to Education.
- Derek Henry Thomson, Leading Keeper, Forestry Commission.
- William Thomson. For political service.
- Susan Jane Tidy (Mrs. Cope), Personal Assistant to Director-General, British Retail Consortium. For services to the Retail Industry.
- Margaret Georgina Todd, Founder and Secretary, Park House Animal Sanctuary, Stelling Minnis, Kent. For services to Animal Welfare.
- John Edward Tomkinson, Chairman and Managing Director, Phosyn plc. For services to Export.
- Colum Isadore Toner. For services to the Magherafelt and Irish League of Credit Unions.
- Doris Townley, Organiser, Women's Royal Voluntary Service, Her Majesty's Prison Lancaster.
- John Martyn Kent Tucker, lately Senior Engineer, Esso Petroleum Company Ltd. For services to Industrial Safety and to Energy Conservation.
- Noel Wesley Tulip, Civic Centre Porter, Newcastle upon Tyne City Council. For services to Local Government.
- Roger John Turley, Member, Health and Safety Commission's Foundries Industry Advisory Committee. For services to Health and Safety.
- Noreen Turner, Development Worker, Toddlers Secret Garden. For services to the community in Wolverhampton.
- Major John Arthur Underwood, ERD, Secretary, Avon Branch, Soldiers', Sailors' and Airmen's Families Association.
- Dennis Roy Upton, lately Project Manager, Satellite Communications Division, Matra Marconi Space UK Ltd. For services to the Space Industry.
- Jean Urquhart. For services to the Arts in Ross-shire.
- Barten George Venner, Professional and Technology Officer, Forestry Commission.
- John Edward Vickers. For services to the Hallamshire Society and to Heritage in Sheffield.
- Ethel Mary (Cemone) Vincent, Chair, Cruse-Bereavement Care (Northern Ireland). For services to Cruse.
- Patricia Wainwright. For political service.
- Frank Edgar Walker. For services to the East and West Sussex War Pensions Committee.
- Eileen Patricia Waller. For services to the Langham Women's Institute.
- Margaret Walsh. For voluntary services to the Probation Service in Wakefield.
- Dennis Alan Warden, Porter and Driver, Steppingley Hospital and for voluntary services to the community in Bedfordshire.
- John Warnock. For services to the Fishing Industry and to the community in Northern Ireland.
- Frank Warren, Principal, Richardson House Rehabilitation Centre. For services to the Residential Care of Deaf People with Mental Illness.
- Ronald Waterman. For services to Education in County Antrim, Northern Ireland.
- Pauline Gay Waters, Forewoman and Driver Grade 1, Department of the Environment.
- John Victor Watkins, Probation Officer, Dorset Probation Service.
- William Allen Watkins. For services to Agriculture and to the community in Kingstone, Herefordshire.
- Hilary Watson, Typist, Her Majesty's Board of Customs and Excise.
- Archibald Watt. For services to the community in Stonehaven, Kincardineshire.
- William Andrew Watts, Chief Executive, The Institute of Plumbing. For services to Plumbing.
- Ann Rachel Wayre. For services to the British Red Cross Society.
- James Weir. For services to the community in Uddingston, Lanarkshire.
- Norman Jeffrey Welsh, Voluntary Fundraiser. For charitable services and for services to the community in Axminster, Devon.
- Valerie Ann Wenham, Adviser, Facilities for Disabled Visitors, National Trust. For services to disabled people.
- Elizabeth Anne West, Administrative Officer, Ministry of Defence.
- Joyce Westwater, Chairperson, Whitfield Steering Group. For services to the community in Dundee.
- Derek Whalley, Bolt Manager, Vickers Shipbuilding and Engineering Ltd. For services to the Shipbuilding Industry.
- David William Whiting, Senior Executive Officer, Department of Employment.
- Francis Walter Wigglesworth, Constable, Cheshire Constabulary.
- Denis Williams, Honorary Secretary, Broseley Horticultural and Crafts Society. For services to the community in Broseley, Shropshire.
- Glynn Williams. For services to the community in East Hampshire.
- Rachel Stewart Williams, Voluntary Auxiliary Observer, Meteorological Office.
- Ann Barlow Wilson. For services to the National Health Service in Scotland.
- Beryl Wilson. For services to Midwifery in Gwent.
- Raymond Wilson, Craft Foreman (Joiner), Vickers Shipbuilding and Engineering Ltd. For services to the Defence Industry.
- Harry Mellows Windsor. For services to the Coventry Diocesan Guild of Church Bellringers.
- Anthony Winfield, Port Manager, Garston Associated British Ports. For services to the Ports Industry.
- Edward Peacock Winter, Technician, Jacob Kramer College, Leeds. For services to Education.
- James Winter, General Manager, Carter Steel Ltd. For services to the Steel Industry.
- Paul Adrian Winter. For services to Occupational Health and Safety.
- Stuart Arthur Dan Winter, Senior Valuer, Her Majesty's Board of Inland Revenue.
- Peter James Winterbottom. For services to Rugby Union Football.
- Peter Morris Wolfe. For services to disabled people in Eyemouth, Berwickshire.
- Dr. David Stanley Wood. For services to the community in Ely, Cardiff.
- Dr. Alexander Finlay Wright, General Medical Practitioner, Glenrothes, Fife. For services to Medicine.
- Frederick Wright, Chairman of Governors, Long Buckby Junior School, Northamptonshire. For services to Education.
- Harry Wright. For services to Association Football and to Boys' Clubs in Cheshire.
- John Francis Watson-Wright, Section Head, Control Group, British Airways Contract Handling. For services to Air Transport.
- Margaret Wylie, Mayor's Secretary, Ballymena Borough Council, Northern Ireland. For services to Local Government.
- Simon Peter Yarwood, Constable, Warwickshire Constabulary.
- Rowdy Yates, Director, Scottish Drugs Training Project, University of Stirling. For services to the Prevention of the Misuse of Drags.
- Stephanie Patricia Yearnshire, Chief Inspector, Northumbria Police.
- Maurice Arthur Youdell. For services to the Nottinghamshire Association of Boys' and Keystone Clubs and the National Association of Boys' Clubs.
- Ann Young, Local Officer I, Department of Social Security.

Diplomatic Service and Overseas List

- Professor David Percy Ambrose. For services to education in Lesotho.
- Gordon Alwyn Ashford. For services to the community in Bermuda.
- Timothy Earle Barrow, lately Second Secretary, HM Embassy, Moscow.
- Christopher David Beese, lately European Community Monitor Mission in former Yugoslavia.
- Deirdre Cornish-Browne. For medical and welfare services to the community in Irian Jaya, Indonesia.
- John George Andrew Buttery, lately SCF Field Director, Hargeisa, Somalia.
- Margery Ida Byrne. For services to the British Community in Chile.
- Chan Chak-chow, Clerical Officer, Immigration Department, Hong Kong.
- Lucas Walter Chan Kwok-hei, Assistant Director of Education, Hong Kong.
- Veronica Chan Yui-kam. For services to football in Hong Kong.
- Choi Hon-ming, Senior Executive Officer, Kowloon Police Region, Hong Kong.
- Chow Kwen-lim, JP. For services to the community in Hong Kong.
- Nina Olive Close. For services to the British community in the United States of America.
- John Crockett. For services to British ex-servicemen in Pakistan.
- Thomas Johnstone Borthwick Cunliffe, Senior Security Officer, HM Embassy, Helsinki.
- Michael Hayward Davenport, lately Second Secretary, HM Embassy, Warsaw.
- Antonia Davey, lately Personal Assistant, NATO, Brussels.
- Victor Douglas Dee. For services to the elderly in Uruguay.
- Gillian Doris Dryden. For services to education in Zimbabwe.
- Donovan Ebanks, Chief Engineer, Public Works Department, Cayman Islands.
- Eileen Victoria Edwards. For services to the community in Montserrat.
- Judith Marion Eiloart. For welfare services in the community in Ghana.
- June Gwendoline Everett. For services to the community in Houston.
- Margaret Jean Gale, British Information Services, New York.
- Michael Desmond Gallagher. For services to wildlife conservation in Oman.
- Anthony Howard Gunn, DFC. For services to the Commonwealth ex-Service League, Malawi.
- Frederick James Lance Haynes. For services to British commercial interests in Papua New Guinea.
- Sally Jane Hinds, lately Second Secretary, HM Embassy, Kiev.
- Albert Ho Chun-keung, Senior Principal Executive Officer, Hospital Services Department, Hong Kong.
- Ho Yung-sang, JP. For services to the community in Hong Kong.
- Helen Margaret Horn, Second Secretary, HM Embassy, Kinshasa.
- Brian Jefferson. For services to the British community in Saudi Arabia.
- Peter Eric Johnson, JP, Director Hong Kong Economic and Trade Affairs, San Francisco.
- Carolyn Persis Cemlyn-Jones, Director British Council, Coimbra, Portugal.
- Joan Hill Kabiruddin, Social Secretary, British High Commission, Dacca.
- Salina Kassim, Entry Clearance Officer, British High Commission, Kuala Lumpur.
- Francis Stewart Kavanagh, CPM, JP, Chief Staff Officer, Civil Aid Services, Hong Kong.
- Lam Yau-sum, Training Officer, Government Dockyard Marine Department, Hong Kong.
- Lau Ho-to, Clerical Officer, Housing Department, Hong Kong.
- Dr. Law Yin-hang. For medical services in Hong Kong.
- Rosemary Maud Bach Leitao. For services to physically disabled people in Portugal.
- Leung Wai-tung, JP. For services to the community in Hong Kong.
- Dr. Albert Li Sze-bay, JP. For services to education in Hong Kong.
- Loo Kwong-yun, Telephone Operator, Immigration Department, Hong Kong.
- Catherine Frances Macleod, Personal Secretary, HM Embassy, Lisbon.
- Lance Malin. For services to mine-clearance in Kuwait.
- Thomas William Colborne-Malpas, lately European Community Monitor Mission in former Yugoslavia.
- Pamela Anne Marvin. For services to the British community in Rio de Janeiro.
- Patrick Gerald McCrudden, First Secretary, British High Commission, Nairobi.
- Colin Jamieson Mitchell. For services to British commercial interests in Paraguay.
- Peter Frank Moss, JP, Assistant Director of Information Services, Hong Kong.
- Ng Jim-hong, Chief Customs Officer, Hong Kong.
- Thomas Henry Norcross. For services to sport in Hong Kong.
- Maurice O'Connell. For services to ex-service community in the Irish Republic.
- Dr. Pang Hau-chung, JP, Deputy Commissioner for Transport, Hong Kong.
- Henry Propper. For services to the community in the Cayman Islands.
- Joseph Marcelino Reyes. For services to football in Gibraltar.
- Frank Robinson. For service to the British ex-service community in the Irish Republic.
- Dora Mary Scarlett. For services to the community in India.
- Michael Shum Shiu-wai, Regional Commander Kowloon, Civil Aid Services, Hong Kong.
- Sylvia Violet Sontag, Senior Personal Secretary, Hong Kong Government Office, London.
- Ruth Elaine Thomas. For services to the community in Bermuda.
- Dr. Jeffrey Tsang Yick-sang. For medical services in Hong Kong.
- Edward Bolton Tucker. For services to deep sea research in Bermuda.
- Roger Harry Virnuls, Honorary Consul, Toulouse.
- John Philip Vowles, Security Officer, HM Embassy, Tehran.
- Dorothy Barbara Waddell. For services to the community in Southern California.
- Philip James Weaver, Senior Marine Officer, Hong Kong.
- June Pamela Webb. For services to physically disabled people in India.
- Winifred Lilian Wheeler, Senior Investigator, ICAC, Hong Kong.
- Colleen Williams. For services to the community in Kuwait.
- Basil Wong Chi-wing. For services to the community in Hong Kong.
- Stephanie Mary Wyer. For services to the terminally ill in Swaziland.
- San Yeung Kin-huen, Chief Dispenser, Department of Health, Hong Kong.

=== Order of the Companions of Honour (CH) ===
- David Astor. For public and charitable services.
- Dame Janet Baker, DBE. For services to the Arts.
- Sir John Smith, CBE. For services to Conservation and the Heritage.

=== Royal Red Cross (RRC) ===
- Lieutenant Colonel Gladys Isabella Smyth, TD, (495093), Queen Alexandra's Royal Army Nursing Corps, Territorial Army.
- Captain Christian John Townend (527607), Queen Alexandra's Royal Army Nursing Corps.

==== Associate of the Royal Red Cross (ARRC) ====
- Senior Nursing Officer Jonathan James Collins, Queen Alexandra's Royal Naval Nursing Service.
- Superintending Nursing Officer Jane Pears-Nolan, Queen Alexandra's Royal Naval Nursing Service (Reserves).
- 24109444 Warrant Officer Class 2 Paul Cottrell, Queen Alexandra's Royal Army Nursing Corps.
- Sergeant Anthony Martin Lewis (K8030218), Princess Mary's Royal Air Force Nursing Service.

=== Air Force Cross (AFC) ===
Royal Navy

- Lieutenant Commander Nicholas James Last.

Royal Air Force

- Wing Commander Alan John Lockwood (5201552).
- Squadron Leader David William Donald Mackay (2622538).
- Squadron Leader Adrian Paul Thurley (8026693).

=== Queen's Police Medal (QPM) ===
England and Wales

- Colin Alexander Couch, Commander, Personnel Department, Metropolitan Police.
- Robert Clifford Davis, Detective Sergeant, Essex Police.
- James Alexander Dickinson, Deputy Commandant, Police Staff College.
- Alan George Elliott, Chief Constable, Cumbria Constabulary.
- David Michael Grubb, Detective Chief Superintendent, West Yorkshire Police.
- David Hubert Howe, Deputy Chief Constable, Merseyside Police.
- Sylvena Ann Hubbard, Commander, Her Majesty's Inspectorate of Constabulary.
- Brian Frank Hudson, Inspector, Staffordshire Police.
- John Owen King, Detective Sergeant, West Midlands Police.
- Grenville William Leesing, Chief Superintendent, Northamptonshire Police.
- Edmund William Marchant, Assistant Chief Constable, Durham Constabulary.
- Norman Mould, Detective Chief Superintendent, No. 3 Regional Crime Squad.
- John David Phillips, Chief Constable, Kent Constabulary.
- Leslie James Poole, Commander, 5 Area Metropolitan Police.
- Arthur Renshaw, Detective Chief Inspector, Greater Manchester Police.
- Dennis Sharp, Detective Inspector, Specialist Operations, Metropolitan Police.
- John Rodney Whitham, Chief Superintendent, 7 Area, Metropolitan Police.
- John Allan Wright, Assistant Chief Constable, Hampshire Constabulary.

Northern Ireland

- William Archibald Maynard McBurney, Detective Chief Superintendent, Royal Ulster Constabulary.
- James Oliver McClure, Detective Chief Superintendent, Royal Ulster Constabulary.

Scotland

- Hugh Roy Graham Cameron, Assistant Chief Constable, Strathclyde Police.
- Alistair Mitchell Walker, Deputy Commandant, Scottish Police College.
- Walter Alexander Williamson, Inspector, Lothian and Borders Police.

Overseas

- James Souter Main, CPM, Assistant Commissioner, Royal Hong Kong Police.
- Anthony Joseph Mullins, CPM, Assistant Commissioner, Royal Hong Kong Police.
- Peter Graham Oakey, CPM, Assistant Commissioner, Royal Hong Kong Police.
- Tsang Yam-pui, CPM, Assistant Commissioner, Royal Hong Kong Police.

=== Queen's Fire Services Medal (QFSM) ===
England and Wales

- David Cartwright, Assistant Chief Officer, London Fire Brigade.
- Robin Lindsay Edward Graham, Assistant Chief Officer, London Fire Brigade.
- Brian Michael Hellin, Assistant Chief Officer, Dorset Fire Brigade.
- Eric Henry Hounslow, Senior Divisional Officer, Hampshire Fire Brigade.
- James Borthwick Manuel, Chief Officer, West Yorkshire Fire Service.
- Graham Martin Smith, Deputy Chief Officer, Oxfordshire Fire Service.

=== Colonial Police and Fire Service Medal (CPM) ===
- Paul Andrew Barkley, Senior Superintendent, Royal Hong Kong Police Force.
- Harold Murdoch Blud, Senior Superintendent, Royal Hong Kong Police Force.
- Peter Charles Burbidge-King, Senior Superintendent, Royal Hong Kong Police Force.
- Chan Kwan-suen, Station Sergeant, Royal Hong Kong Police Force.
- Chan Kiu-luen, Principal Fireman, Hong Kong Fire Services.
- Annie Deptford Chu Ying-nee, Senior Superintendent, Royal Hong Kong Police Force.
- Michael Peter Dunn, Superintendent, Royal Hong Kong Police Force.
- James Arthur Elms, Senior Superintendent, Royal Hong Kong Police Force.
- Brian Francis, Superintendent, Royal Hong Kong Police Force.
- Glyn Edward Jones, Senior Superintendent, Royal Hong Kong Police Force.
- Kwok Hon-chung, Senior Divisional Officer, Hong Kong Fire Services.
- Patrick Lai Pak-hay, Superintendent, Royal Hong Kong Police Force.
- Lau Kai-mo, Station Sergeant, Royal Hong Kong Police Force.
- Lau Kin-shing, Station Sergeant, Royal Hong Kong Police Force.
- Lo Chu-hung, Superintendent, Royal Hong Kong Police Force.
- Alexander Lo Wah-chun, Superintendent, Royal Hong Kong Police Force.
- Lo Wing-hing, Inspector, Royal Hong Kong Police Force.
- Lok Tak-chi, Station Sergeant, Royal Hong Kong Police Force.
- Mak Kwai-pui, Senior Assistant Chief Ambulance Officer, Hong Kong Fire Services.
- Peter Ng Chun-pong, Superintendent, Royal Hong Kong Police Force.
- Ng Man-kim, Senior Superintendent, Royal Hong Kong Police Force.
- Albert Poon Cho-kee, Chief Superintendent (Auxiliary), Royal Hong Kong Auxiliary Police Force.
- Sung Sau-man, Senior Divisional Officer, Hong Kong Fire Services.
- Wong Chau-ho, Station Sergeant, Royal Hong Kong Police Force.
- Peter Wong Kai-chi, Senior Station Officer, Hong Fire Services.

=== Queen's Commendation for Valuable Service in the Air ===
Army

- 24501682 Warrant Officer Class 1 Patrick Charles James, Army Air Corps.

Royal Air Force

- Squadron Leader Christopher John Coulls (8019628).
- Flight Lieutenant Adrian Stewart Frost (5204245).
- Master Aircrew Ronald Stuart Graham (F4283230).
- Squadron Leader Gordon James McClymont (2622514).
- Flight Lieutenant George Whitley Morris (4231023).
- Squadron Leader Gordon Lindsay Reekie (4233066).
- Flight Lieutenant Stephen Andrew Tait (8024093).

== Cook Islands ==
=== Order of the British Empire ===
==== Officer of the Order of the British Empire (OBE) ====
Civil Division

- The Honourable Kura Strickland. For services to the community.

=== British Empire Medal (BEM) ===
Civil Division

- Arnold Leslie Clayson Gibbons. For services to the community.

== Bahamas ==
=== Order of Saint Michael and Saint George ===
==== Companion of the Order of St Michael and St George (CMG) ====
- The Right Reverend Drexel Wellington Gomez. For service to the Church and the Country.
- Geoffrey Adams Dinwiddie Johnstone. For services to the civic, economic and political development of the Country.

=== Order of the British Empire ===
==== Officer of the Order of the British Empire (OBE) ====
Civil Division

- Elder Silas Napoleon McKinney. For services to the Church.
- Mary Thelma Sweetnam. For public service.
- Cyril Flubert Tynes. For services to the civic and political development of the Country.

==== Member of the Order of the British Empire (MBE) ====
Civil Division

- Michael Maxwell Cartwright. For services to the economic and social development of the Country.
- Sheddie Garnet Cox Sr. For services as a community leader.
- The Reverend Dr. Raymond Jones. For services as a community leader.
- Christopher Gustavis Roberts. For services as a community leader.
- Sister Maedene Naomi Russell. For services to education.

=== British Empire Medal (BEM) ===
Civil Division

- Llonella Louise Cooper. For services to the teaching profession.
- Rosalie Blanche Smith. For services to teaching.
- Edris Alma Turner. For services to the nursing profession.

== Grenada ==
=== Order of the British Empire ===
==== Commander of the Order of the British Empire (CBE) ====
Civil Division

- The Honourable Mr. Justice Lyle Kevin St. Paul, OBE. For services to the judiciary.

==== Member of the Order of the British Empire (MBE) ====
Civil Division

- Esther Fletcher. For services to early childhood education.
- Junior Randolf Murray. For services to sport.

== Papua New Guinea ==
=== Knight Bachelor ===
- Angmai Simon Bilas, OBE. For services to the community and politics.
- The Honourable Timothy James Ward, MP. For services to the community and politics.

=== Order of Saint Michael and Saint George ===
==== Companion of the Order of St Michael and St George (CMG) ====
- Pato Kakarya, CBE. For services to the community and politics.

=== Order of the British Empire ===
==== Knight Commander of the Order of the British Empire (KBE) ====
Civil Division

- Brian Ernest Bell, OBE. For services to business and the community.

==== Commander of the Order of the British Empire (CBE) ====
Military Division

- Brigadier General Robert Medode Dademo, OBE, (82213), Papua New Guinea Defence Force.

Civil Division

- Gerea Aopi, MBE. For public service.
- Renagi Renagi Lohia, OBE. For public service.

==== Officer of the Order of the British Empire (OBE) ====
Military Division

- Colonel Fred Geyasa Aikung (86004), Papua New Guinea Defence Force.

Civil Division

- Bono Azenifa. For services to the community and politics.
- Frank John Igo. For public and community service.
- Stephen Nao Igo. For public service.
- The Right Reverend Edea Kidu. For services to the community.

==== Member of the Order of the British Empire (MBE) ====
Military Division

- Warrant Officer John Coomer (83157), Papua New Guinea Defence Force.
- Warrant Officer Varaba Maino (83003), Papua New Guinea Defence Force.
- Chief Warrant Officer Joel Narara (86163), Papua New Guinea Defence Force.

Civil Division

- Colin Bubner. For services to the community.
- Komb Dei. For services to the community.
- Margaret Laymette Elias. For public and community service.
- David George Guinn. For services to the community and business.
- Pastor Tony Kemo. For services to the Church and the community.
- Patrick Joseph Paulisbo. For services to the community and politics.
- Chief Inspector Kurena Serupi. For services to the Papua New Guinea correctional services.
- Soekandar Tjandra. For services to the community.
- Moses Warpulu. For public service.

=== Companion of the Imperial Service Order (ISO) ===
- Josepha Kanawi. For public service.
- Isaiah Oda. For services to the community and politics.

=== British Empire Medal (BEM) ===
Military Division

- Sergeant Michael Depe (86177), Papua New Guinea Defence Force.
- Corporal Gregory Kedena (84707), Papua New Guinea Defence Force.
- Sergeant Amos Tommy Umasi (86239), Papua New Guinea Defence Force.

Civil Division

- Peni Ase. For public and community service.
- Kila Laura Burro. For public service.
- Jawoi Kerua. For services to Airlines, Department of Prime Minister and National Executive Council.
- Timi Koriveno. For services to Government House.
- Apelis Levi. For public and community service.
- Emily George Taule. For services to sport and the community.
- Benson Wanariu. For public service.

=== Queen's Police Medal (QPM) ===
- Chief Inspector William Kavulio. For services to the Royal Papua New Guinea Constabulary.

== Solomon Islands ==
=== Order of the British Empire ===
==== Officer of the Order of the British Empire (OBE) ====
Civil Division

- Father Chanel Diki. For services to the Roman Catholic Church and the community.

== Saint Vincent and the Grenadines ==
=== Order of the British Empire ===
==== Member of the Order of the British Empire (MBE) ====
Civil Division

- Denniston Caleb Haziecher Bobb, JP. For public service.
- Sylvester Taylor. For community service.

== Antigua and Barbuda ==
=== Order of Saint Michael and Saint George ===
==== Companion of the Order of St Michael and St George (CMG) ====
- Lounel Nathaniel Stevens, OBE. For public service.

=== Order of the British Empire ===
==== Officer of the Order of the British Empire (OBE) ====
Civil Division

- Louis Hippolyte Lockhart. For services to banking, law and the social development of Antigua and Barbuda.

==== Member of the Order of the British Empire (MBE) ====
Civil Division

- Ruth Eugenie Ambrose. For services to teaching, the Civil Service and the Red Cross.
- Lindberg Agustus Dowe. For public service.

== Saint Christopher and Nevis ==
=== Order of Saint Michael and Saint George ===
==== Companion of the Order of St Michael and St George (CMG) ====
- Terence Victor Byron. For public service.

=== Order of the British Empire ===
==== Officer of the Order of the British Empire (OBE) ====
Civil Division

- Dr. Ersdale Onessimus Jacobs. For services to the community.
