= Chris Long (priest) =

English Anglican priest (born 1947)

Christopher William Long MBE (born 1947) is an Anglican priest.

Long was educated at the University of Nottingham and Lincoln Theological College and ordained in 1978. After a curacy at Shiregreen he was with the Royal Air Force Chaplains Branch from 1982 until 2005. He was the Incumbent of Enniscorthy from 2005 until 2015; Archdeacon of Ferns from 2008 to 2015; and Archdeacon of Cashel, Waterford and Lismore from 2014 until 2015.

He was appointed MBE in the 1994 New Year Honours.
