= Mark Williamson (biologist) =

British biologist

Mark Herbert Williamson OBE
- Citizenship: United Kingdom
- Education: Christ Church, Oxford
- Known for: Biological invasion
- Scientific career
- Fields: Biology
- Workplaces: University of Oxford; University of Edinburgh; University of York

Mark Herbert Williamson OBE is Professor Emeritus of Biology at the University of York, England. He is an expert on biological invasions.

Williamson attended Christ Church, Oxford where he gained a BA degree in 1950 and received a D.Phil. in 1958, having been a Departmental Demonstrator in the Department of Zoology, University of Oxford since 1952.

Between 1958 and 1962, Williamson was a Senior/Principal Scientific Officer (SSO/PSO) at the Oceanographic Laboratory of the Scottish Marine Biological Association. Between 1962 and 1965, he was a Lecturer at the Department of Zoology at Edinburgh University. In 1963, he was appointed Professor at the Department of Biology, University of York, on its founding. He was Head of Department in the Department of Biology at York from 1963 until 1984.

In 1993, Mark Williamson was appointed professor emeritus. In 1994, he received an OBE in the 1994 New Year Honours.

== Books ==
- Williamson, Mark (1972). The Analysis of Biological Populations. Edward Arnold, London. ISBN 07131-2347-8
- Williamson, Mark (1981). Island Populations. Oxford University Press, Oxford. ISBN 0-19-854139-2
- Williamson, Mark (1996). Biological Invasions. Chapman & Hall, London. ISBN 0-412-59190-1
- Williamson, Mark; White, David, eds. (2013). A History of the First Fifty Years of Biology at York. Department of Biology, University of York. (PDF)
- Perrings, Charles; Mooney, Harold; Williamson, Mark, eds. (2010). Bioinvasions and Globalization: Ecology, Economics, Management, and Policy. Oxford University Press, Oxford. ISBN 978-0199560158
