= Colin Spedding =

British biologist, agricultural scientist and animal welfare expert

Colin Raymond William Spedding CBE
- Born: 22 March 1925
- Died: 17 December 2012 (aged 87)
- Education: University of London
- Occupations: Biologist; agricultural scientist
- Known for: Farming research and animal welfare advocacy

Sir Colin Raymond William Spedding CBE (22 March 1925 – 17 December 2012) was a British biologist, agricultural scientist and animal welfare expert. Spedding founded or worked for numerous agricultural agencies, including the Farm Animal Welfare Council, Assured Food Standards and the UK Register of Organic Food Standards. He also held academic posts at the University of Reading and the Grassland Research Institute, and was a prolific author of books on wildlife and agriculture.

== Early life and education ==
Spedding was born in 1925, the son of an itinerant Methodist minister. He attended several different schools before leaving education without qualifications in 1939. During the Second World War, Spedding served aboard Royal Navy torpedo boats. After the war, he secured a menial laboratory job, and studied as an evening student to gain a degree in zoology from the University of London.

== Academic career ==
Between 1949 and 1975, Spedding worked at the Grassland Research Institute in Hurley, Berkshire. Thereafter, he became Professor of Agricultural Systems at the University of Reading, also serving as the university's Dean of the Faculty of Agriculture and Food, and as its pro-vice-chancellor between 1986 and his nominal retirement in 1990. He furthermore served as a governor of the Royal Agricultural College between 1982 and 1988, and was President of the Institute of Biology from 1992 to 1994. As well as publishing over 200 academic papers, Spedding wrote or edited a total of 19 books both during and after his academic career, on subjects as diverse as farming, garden wildlife and proverbs. He was appointed CBE in 1988, and knighted in the 1994 New Year Honours.

== Animal welfare advocacy ==
Spedding founded or chaired numerous animal welfare and organic certification organisations, including the Farm Animal Welfare Council, Assured Food Standards, the National Equine Forum, the Apple and Pear Research Council and the UK Register of Organic Food Standards. While heading the Farm Animal Welfare Council in the 1990s, he presided over the development of five key tenets of animal welfare: "freedom from hunger and thirst; from discomfort; from pain and disease; from fear; and freedom to express normal behaviour".

== Personal life ==
Spedding married Betsy George in 1952. They had two sons and a daughter before Betsy's death in 1988; one of their sons predeceased Spedding. Spedding was a keen gardener, and kept a three-acre garden at his home in Berkshire, which he often opened to local schoolchildren for the study of wildlife. He died in December 2012, aged 87.
