= David Yardley =

British legal scholar (1929–2014)

Sir David Yardley
- Born: David Charles Miller Yardley; 4 June 1929
- Died: 3 June 2014 (aged 84)

Academic work
- Discipline: Legal scholar
- Sub-discipline: Jurisprudence; British constitutional law; administrative law; English law
- Institutions: St Edmund Hall, Oxford; Faculty of Law, University of Oxford; University of Birmingham; Oxford Polytechnic; University College at Buckingham

Sir David Charles Miller Yardley (4 June 1929 – 3 June 2014) was a British legal scholar and public servant. Although a barrister, Yardley spent his legal career in academia. From 1953 to 1974, he taught jurisprudence at the University of Oxford, where he was a fellow of St Edmund Hall, Oxford. He then held chairs at the University of Birmingham, Oxford Polytechnic, and the University College at Buckingham. He then served as chair of the Commission for Local Administration in England from 1982 to 1994, for which he was knighted.

== Career ==
Yardley was called to the bar at Gray's Inn in 1952. In 1953, he was elected a fellow of St Edmund Hall, Oxford. From 1953 to 1974, he was tutor in jurisprudence at St Edmund Hall and a lecturer at the University of Oxford. He served as senior proctor of the University of Oxford for the 1965/66 academic year. After he left Oxford, he was made an emeritus fellow of St Edmund Hall.

He was then Barber Professor of Law at the University of Birmingham (1974–1978), Head of the Department of Law, Politics and Economics at Oxford Polytechnic (1978–1980), and Rank Foundation Professor of Law at the University College at Buckingham (1980–1982). He maintained his link with academia as a visiting professor at Oxford Brookes from 1995 to 2001.

Following retirement from academia, he served as chairman of the Commission for Local Administration in England from 1982 to 1994, and a complaints commissioner at the Securities and Investments Board from 1994 to 2001.

== Honours ==
In 1989, Yardley was made a Freeman of the City of Oxford. In the 1994 New Year Honours, he was appointed a Knight Bachelor "for services to Local Government". On 31 March 1994, he received the accolade from Charles, Prince of Wales during a ceremony at Buckingham Palace.

== Selected works ==
- Yardley, D. C. M. (1960). Introduction to British Constitutional Law. Oxford: Butterworth.
- Yardley, D. C. M. (1964). The Future of the Law. London: Cresset Press.
- Yardley, D. C. M. (1966). Geldart's Elements of English law. Oxford: Oxford University Press.
- Yardley, D. C. M. (1995). Introduction to constitutional and administrative law (8th ed.). Oxford: Butterworths. ISBN 9780406041722.
