= Barry Skipper =

English businessman

Barry John Skipper CBE was Vice Chairman for Norwich City and he joined the club in 1996.

Skipper held Sales and Marketing positions with Procter & Gamble, Mars and Cadbury Schweppes. and was chief executive of Booker's food distribution division. He was appointed Commander of the Order of the British Empire (CBE) in the 1994 New Year Honours for services to the food industry.

On 8 May 2007, Skipper stood down as Vice Chairman of Norwich after more than 10 years at the club.
