= Anthony Merifield =

British civil servant (1934–2024)

Sir Anthony James Merifield, KCVO, CB (5 March 1934 – 24 October 2024) was a British civil servant.

== Life and career ==
Born on 5 March 1934, Merifield attended Wadham College, Oxford. After graduating and completing National Service, he joined HM Overseas Civil Service in 1958 and served in Kenya until 1965, when he returned to the United Kingdom to work in the Department of Health and Social Security (DHSS). There, he was promoted to Assistant Secretary in 1971 and Under-Secretary seven years later; in 1982, he moved to the Northern Ireland Office and then in 1986 returned to the DHSS as a director in the NHS Management Board. He then worked as Head of the Senior and Public Appointments Group in the Cabinet Office (CO) from 1991 to 1994, when he became Ceremonial Officer in the CO. On retirement in 2000, he was appointed a Knight Commander of the Royal Victorian Order in the New Year Honours. He had also been appointed a Companion of the Order of the Bath in the 1994 New Year Honours.

Merifield died on 24 October 2024, at the age of 90.
