= Monique Viner =

British judge (1926–2006)

Monique Viner CBE

Personal details
- Born: Monique Sylvaine Viner; 3 October 1926 Belgium
- Died: 10 October 2006 (aged 80)
- Spouse: Pieter Francis Gray (m. 1958)
- Children: 4
- Education: St Hugh's College, Oxford
- Occupation: judge

Monique Sylvaine Viner CBE (married name Gray; 3 October 1926 – 10 October 2006) was a British judge. She was one of the United Kingdom's first female lawyers.

== Biography ==
Viner was born on 3 October 1926 in Belgium to an English father and a Belgian mother. She was educated at the Sacred Heart Convent in Roehampton and St Hugh's College, Oxford. She was called to the bar in 1950 as one of only 40 women barristers. From 1952 until 1993, she served as member and chair of various wages councils.

She was appointed a crown court recorder in 1986, elected to the bench of Gray's Inn in 1988 and appointed to the circuit bench in 1990, where she sat in family matters until her retirement in 1999. In the 1994 New Year Honours she was made a Commander of the Order of the British Empire.

A scholarship at Gray's Inn exists in her name.

== Personal life ==
Viner was a Roman Catholic. In 1958, Viner married the Belgian-born physician Pieter Francis Gray. Viner and Gray had four children.

On 10 October 2006, Viner died aged 80.
