= Sylvia Denman =

British academic, barrister, and public servant (1932–2019)

Sylvia Denman CBE

Personal details
- Born: 16 September 1932 Barbados
- Died: 1 May 2019 (aged 86)
- Education: Queen's College (Barbados); London School of Economics; Lincoln's Inn

Sylvia Elaine Denman CBE (16 September 1932 – 1 May 2019) was a British academic, barrister, and public servant known for her work in advancing race relations in the United Kingdom. Her most well known work was in authoring the Denman Report.

== Early life ==
She was born in Barbados to Euleen and Alexander Yarde and attended Queen's College, before moving to London to study law at the London School of Economics. She then trained as a barrister and was called to the bar at Lincoln's Inn in 1962.

== Career ==
Herman began her career as an academic, holding positions at Oxford Polytechnic, 1965-76 (which became Oxford Brookes University), New York University, and in the West Indies.

She served on the boards of the Race Relations Board, the Equal Opportunities Commission, the Housing Corporation, Oxford Brookes University, Haverstock School, the Runnymede Trust, and as chair of the Camden and Islington health authority.

From 1999 to 2001, she chaired an inquiry into race discrimination in the Crown Prosecution Service, which found it to be institutionally racist.

== Personal life ==
She was appointed CBE in 1994.

She received an honorary degree from Birmingham City University.
