= St Alban's Church, Llanelli =

St Alban's Church
- Location in Wales Location in United Kingdom
- 51.6833°N 4.1496°W
- Location: Alban Road, Llanelli
- Country: Wales
- Denomination: Anglican

History
- Founded: 1911

Architecture
- Heritage designation: Grade II
- Designated: 3 December 1992
- Architectural type: Church
- Style: Late Gothic style

St Alban's Church Was an Anglican church in the town of Llanelli, Carmarthenshire, Wales. It was built between 1911 and 1915 and is located prominently on a hilltop at the junction of Alban Road and Stebonheath. It was designated as a Grade II listed building on 3 December 1992 and is now in private ownership.

The Church of St. Alban was erected between 1911 and 1915 by E. M. Bruce Vaughan. Set high on a hill, there is a large basement under its west end. It is built in the local greyish-brown stone with dressings of Bath stone. It is in the late decorative to early perpendicular style and its design is probably influenced by George Frederick Bodley; the clerestoried nave with side aisles is long and the chancel high. The interior is faced with smooth grey ashlar with Bath stone decoration, and the nave is well-lit by the large, high-positioned east windows. The nave has an open timber roof while the chancel has a painted and panelled ceiling. The chancel floor is tiled in green and white. The baptismal font Which was removed and sold by the Church of Wales, was a finely carved ashlar bowl standing on marble legs.

The church was designated as a Grade II listed building on 3 December 1992, the reason for listing being that it is a fine example of a church of its period. The Royal Commission on the Ancient and Historical Monuments of Wales curates the archaeological, architectural and historic records for this church. These include digital photographs of the exterior and interior. The church was declared redundant by the Church in Wales and sold in 2011. It is now thought to be used for residential and commercial purposes.
