= Angus Stirling =

British arts administrator and conservationist (1933–2026)

Sir Angus Duncan Æneas Stirling (10 December 1933 – 1 June 2026) was a British arts administrator and conservationist who was director general of the National Trust and served on many other charitable bodies in the United Kingdom.

Stirling was educated at Eton College and Trinity College, Cambridge, before taking a Diploma in the History of Art at London University as an extramural student. He was Honorary Fellow of The Courtauld Institute of Art, and Trinity Laban Conservatoire of Music and Dance. He trained as an artist at the Lydgate Art Research Centre in Britain and had exhibitions in London and in Somerset.

Sir Angus Stirling died on 1 June 2026, aged 92.

== Appointments ==
- Director general of the National Trust 1983–1995
- Chairman of the Greenwich Foundation for the Royal Naval College, Greenwich 1997–2004
- Trustee of the Samuel Courtauld Trust 1990–2012
- Member of governing board, the Courtauld Institute of Art 1981–1983 and 2002–2014
- Trustee, World Monuments Fund in Britain, 1996–2007
- Governor of Gresham's School
- Chairman of the Royal Opera House, 1991–1996
- Trustee of the City and Guilds of London Art School
- Chairman of the Joint Nature Conservation Committee 1997–2002
- Member of the Stowe House Preservation Trust 1998–2012
- President of the Friends of Holland Park
