= Penscynor Wildlife Park =

- Interactive map of Penscynor Wildlife Park
- 51.6809069°N 3.7828966°W
- Date opened: 1971
- Date closed: September 1998
- Location: Neath, Wales
- Land area: 11 acres (4.5 ha)
- No. of animals: 174
- Annual visitors: 200,000

Penscynor Wildlife Park was a wildlife and safari park located near Neath in South Wales.

== History ==
In 1966, Neath builder Idris Hale bought the semi-derelict Penscynor House in Cilfrew. The 11-acre (4.5 ha) grounds then became home to a large collection of exotic parrots and a number of charity days were held in response to public demand to see the birds.

Idris then decided to open the park to the public in 1971. It was launched by TV personality Johnny Morris, of the Animal Magic TV series.

Success followed and it remained in the family's ownership until 1996 when Mr Hale's grandson, Jonathan Hale-Quant, took it over.

The park had annual attendance of 200,000 visitors and employed 18 staff.

== Inhabitants ==
- Mammals 28
- Birds 87
- Reptiles 8
- Amphibians 3
- Fish 40
- Invertebrates 8

Total 174 animals at time of closure.

== Closure ==
Since 1998 the park has been abandoned. Starting in 1999, the Northern part of the park was developed into 41 residential units, retaining the children's playground from the zoo and area around it as open space.

Jonathan Quant put Penscynor House up for sale in 2005. Plans for converting it from "residential dwelling (Class C3) to care home for up to 5 residents (Class C2)" were approved on 18 October 2011. Many of the enclosures still existed as of 2012, including the chimp houses and penguin pool. All structures are derelict, and in poor condition.
