= Violet Brand =

British educator and author (1929–2020)

Violet Brand (née Boughton) MBE (c. 1929 – 4 April 2020) was the author of the best-selling Spelling Made Easy series.

== Life ==
Violet Boughton was born in Canterbury, one of four children of parents involved in the Salvation Army. She established the Watford Dyslexia Centre and promoted the understanding and teaching of dyslexic children at a time when there was great hostility in many quarters to the whole concept. Over a number of years she had devoted her time to help these children and their teachers and was awarded an MBE in recognition. In 2011 she received an Outstanding Lifetime Academic Achievement Award from the British Dyslexia Association.

In 1950, she married Geoffrey Edward Brand, a professional musician and conductor, later a BBC producer; their children were Michael and Gill. Violet is the grandmother of comedian Katy Brand.
