= Meat fruit =

Meat dish resembling fruit

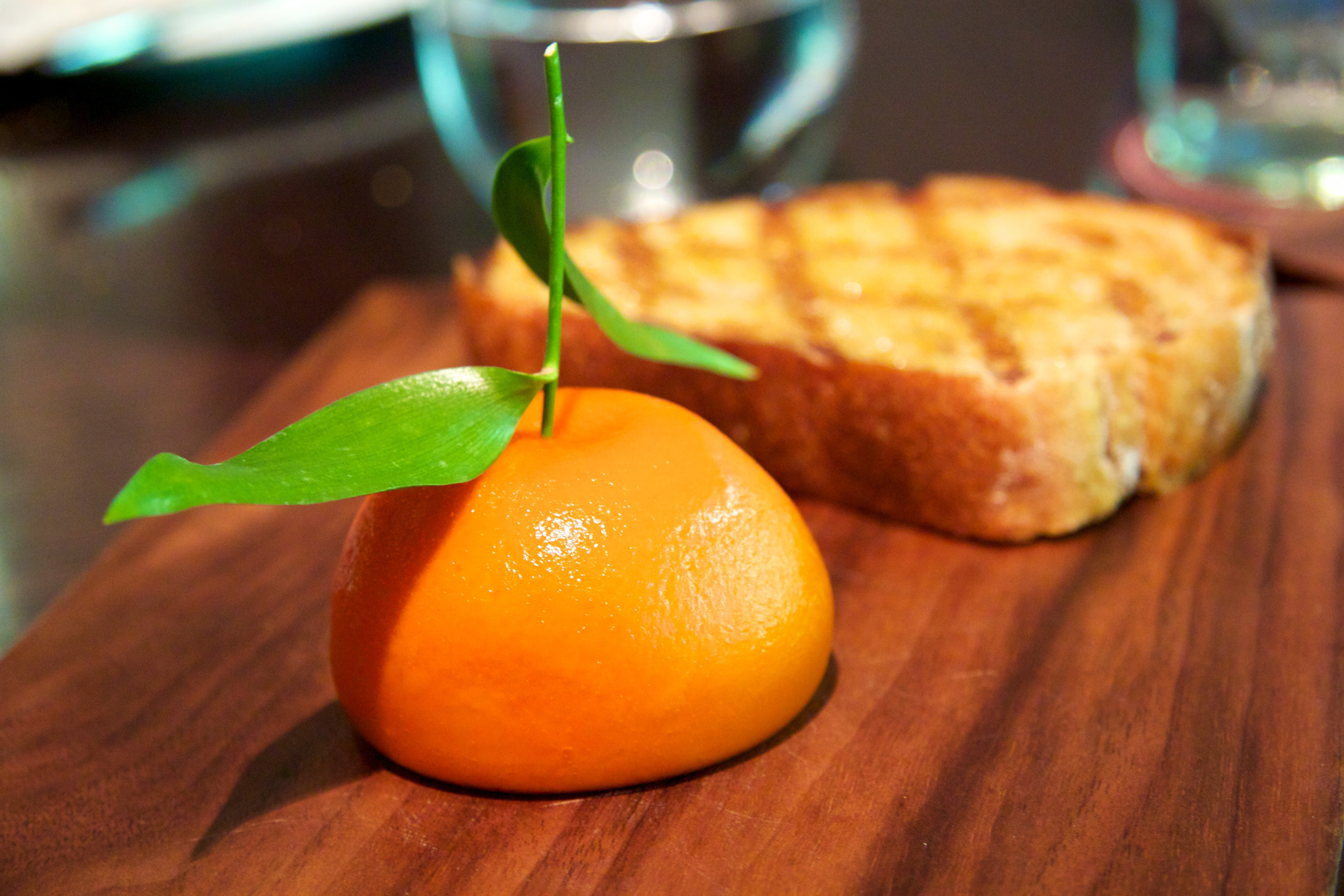
Meat fruit, served at Dinner by Heston Blumenthal

A meat fruit is a dish wherein meat is processed to resemble a piece of fruit. Meat fruit was eaten in the medieval and early modern periods in England. Cooks would shape and colour pork to resemble apples to produce a food they called Pome Dorres. In 1399, this was served as part of the feast accompanying the coronation of Henry IV.

In the 21st century, the English chefs Heston Blumenthal and Ashley Palmer-Watts rediscovered the dish, using modern equipment and ingredients to create a dish of chicken liver and foie gras parfait coated in a glaze that resembles a mandarin orange. It is the signature dish of Dinner by Heston Blumenthal in London, where it has garnered praise from restaurant critics.

== Historical ==
During feasts in historic Britain, cooks would sometimes fashion dishes to resemble something else. In the medieval and early modern periods, one of these preparations was meat fruit, wherein pork was formed into balls the size of apples and coloured with ingredients such as saffron and parsley.

A reference to the dish appears in 1399, when Pome Dorres ('Apple of Gold' or 'Apples Glazed'), was served at a feast accompanying the coronation of Henry IV. Meat fruit was prepared by chefs during Tudor times, who used the dish to play on concerns of the era that worried eating raw fruit would make people sick. A recipe for Pome dorres appears in the recipe collection Harleian MS. 279, circa 1430. Translated from the original Middle English, it directed cooks to:

Take Fillets of Raw pork, & grind them well; put Salt [and] powdered Pepper thereto; then take the White of the Egg [and] throw thereto, & make them so hard that they might be Roasted on a Spit; make them round as an Apple: make fire without smoke; then take Almond milk, & sifted flour, put them together; take Sugar, & put in thine batter; then glaze them with some green thing, parsley or yolks of Egg, together, that they are green; & be well aware that they are not Brown; & some men boil them in fresh broth before they are spitted; & when they are so boiled, then they must be set and cooled, & then Spit them, & glaze them with yolks of Eggs mixed with the Juice of hazel leaves. (Note: In the original Middle English: Take Fylettys of Raw porke, & grynd hem wyl; do Salt [and] pouder Pepir þer-to; þan take þe Whyte of the Eyroun [and] þrow þer-to, & make hem so hard þat þey mow ben Rosted on a Spete; make hem round as an Appil: make fyre with-owte smoke; þen take Almaunde mylke, & y-bontyd flour, do hem to-gederys; takeSugre, & putte in þin bature; þen dore hem with sum grene þing, percely or 30lkys of Eyroun, to-geder, þat þey ben grene; & be wyl war pat pey ben nowt Browne; & sum men boyle hem in freysshe broþ or pey ben spetid; & whan þey ben so boylid, þen þey must ben sette an kelid, & þan Spete hem, & dore hem with 3zolkys of Eyroun y- mengyd with þe Ius of haselle leuys.)

== Modern version ==
=== Development ===
In the 21st century, the English chefs Heston Blumenthal and Ashley Palmer-Watts developed a modernised version of meat fruit. Using foie gras and chicken liver parfait, their dish resembles a mandarin orange. It was created during the 18 months preceding the opening of the London restaurant Dinner by Heston Blumenthal. Palmer-Watts, Blumenthal's head chef at the Fat Duck in Bray, Berkshire, worked with Blumenthal in researching dishes from Britain's history, reproducing and adapting historic foods and drinks like beef royale and chocolate wine. Blumenthal describes records of meat fruit in particular attracting his attention, stating "it was completely mad". Palmer-Watts did much of the work in adapting meat fruit to the modern kitchen, which took place over several months. The pair chose to make the dish resemble a mandarin in reference to the Mandarin Oriental, the hotel that Dinner was to reside in.

=== Preparation ===
At the core of Dinner's meat fruit was a very smooth parfait of chicken liver and foie gras, flavoured with brandy, Madeira, and white and ruby ports. Using rubber moulds, the parfait was formed into spheres and then frozen, before being immersed in a mixture of mandarin purée, glucose, gelatin, essential oils, and paprika extract. Within a few seconds, the cold surface of the parfait causes the jelly to set.

After being left to dry overnight, the spheres of parfait were dipped in liquid nitrogen to freeze and dunked again in the mandarin purée mixture, forming a pockmarked surface that resembled the skin of a mandarin orange. The likeness was furthered by topping the dish with the citrus-like leaf of a ruscus shrub. Its flavour contains a contrast between the sweet, lightly citrusy exterior and a rich and creamy parfait centre.

During the Christmas season, Dinner has prepared their meat fruit to resemble a plum, using a spiced plum purée as its coating. By 2022, Dinner had phased out the use of foie gras in its meat fruit, making the dish solely with chicken liver.

A recipe for meat fruit was provided by Blumenthal to The Guardian, with the suggestion that home cooks omit the parfait's foie gras and instead just use chicken liver. Blumenthal included another recipe in his 2013 cookbook Historic Heston. The recipe, spanning over a thousand words, required several days of work and the use of sophisticated kitchen equipment such as a Thermomix, a sous-vide machine, heat probes and silicon moulds.

=== At Dinner ===
Blumenthal featured meat fruit on an episode of his TV show Heston's Feasts (2009), as the aperitif in a medieval feast, and in January 2011, served it at the opening of Dinner. There, it was sold as an entree, presented on a wooden board with a piece of sourdough toast.

Meat fruit became the most famous dish at Dinner. Several chefs have given the dish compliments, including Mark Hix and Pierre Koffmann, while others have prepared versions, such as Chris Curren at Chicago's Fulton Market Kitchen. Several reviews of Dinner have singled out meat fruit for praise; Jay Rayner at the Observer, for instance, stated upon the restaurant's opening that it was "destined to become a culinary icon". The restaurant capitalises both 'meat' and 'fruit'; this, argues the authors Charles Spence and Betina Piqueras-Fiszman, leaves ambiguous whether the meat or fruit aspects should be understood as dominant.

== See also ==
- Bacon-and-egg ice cream
- Snail porridge
- Triple cooked chips

== Sources ==
- Andrews, Colman (2016). The British Table: A New Look at the Traditional Cooking of England, Scotland, and Wales. New York: Abrams. ISBN 978-1-4197-2223-3.
- Frost, Warwick (2016). Gastronomy, Tourism and the Media. Aspects of Tourism. Bristol, UK & Tonawanda, NY: Channel View Publications. ISBN 978-1-84541-574-7.
- Kolpas, Norman (2021). Foie Gras: A Global History. London: Reaktion Books. ISBN 978-1-78914-377-5.
- Renfrow, Cindy (1997). Take a Thousand Eggs or More: A Translation of Medieval Recipes from Harleian MS. 279, Harleian MS. 4016, and Extracts of Ashmole MS. 1439, Laud MS. 553, and Douce MS. 55, with Over 100 Recipes Adapted for Modern Cookery (2nd ed.). United States: C. Renfrow. ISBN 0-9628598-4-2.
- Silva, Chelsea (2024). "Domestic Wonder and the Medieval Home". In Griffin, Carrie; Ryley, Hannah (eds.). Recipes and Book Culture in England, 1350–1600. Exeter Medieval Texts and Studies. Liverpool: Liverpool University Press. ISBN 978-1-80207-463-5.
- Sitwell, William (2013). A History of Food in 100 Recipes. New York, London: Little, Brown. ISBN 978-0-316-22997-5.
- Spence, Charles; Piqueras-Fiszman, Betina (2014). The Perfect Meal: The Multisensory Science of Food and Dining. Chichester, West Sussex, UK: John Wiley & Sons. ISBN 978-1-118-49082-2.
- Tillie, Carolyn (2019). Feast for the Eyes: Edible Art from Apple to Zucchini. London: Reaktion Books. ISBN 978-1-78914-063-7.
