= Jocky Petrie (chef) =

Scottish professional chef

- Born: James Petrie; Duror, Scotland
- Occupation: Chef
- Known for: Head of development for Heston Blumenthal (The Fat Duck) and Gordon Ramsay; Hell's Kitchen
- Spouse: Una Palliser
- Children: 2

James "Jocky" Petrie is a Scottish chef, known for his work alongside Heston Blumenthal as head of creative development of the Experimental Kitchen at The Fat Duck, and as group executive development chef for Gordon Ramsay. He has appeared as mentor and judge on MasterChef, Heston's Fantastical Food, In Search of Perfection, and Top Chef Suomi.

Petrie was a sous-chef to Ramsay on Hell's Kitchen in the show's seventeenth season and eighteenth season first broadcast in September 2017.

== Career ==
Originally from Duror, a village in the Scottish Highlands, Petrie began his career in Scotland in the hotels of Edinburgh and Kinnaird Estate in Perthshire. He then moved south to one Michelin star Hambleton Hall before leaving the UK for Virginia in the United States, to work at three Michelin Star The Inn at Little Washington.

In 2001, Petrie joined The Fat Duck in Bray, Berkshire where he rose to head pastry chef role, during which time the restaurant achieved a third Michelin star and was ranked 1st on the list of The World's 50 Best Restaurants. In 2009, Petrie was appointed head of development of The Fat Duck Experimental Kitchen, later that year the restaurant was given a top score of ten out of ten in The Good Food Guide. His role also included development of dishes for all of Blumenthal's restaurants and brands, including The Hinds Head and Dinner by Heston Blumenthal in central London. In 2011/12 he was involved in writing research paper 'Bittersweet Symphony' with Heston Blumenthal and Charles Spence, professor of experimental psychology at Oxford University, exploring the manipulation of bitter and sweet tastes through the use of music.

Petrie resigned from his post at The Fat Duck in 2013. In 2014-15 he completed a year-long post as head of development at two Michelin Star London restaurant The Ledbury. Petrie joined the Gordon Ramsay Group in 2015 in the role of executive head of development. His role included overseeing, creating and developing dishes for Ramsay's restaurants, opening new restaurants, helping write Ramsay’s books and working with Ramsay on his television shows. He has been referred to as Gordon’s right hand man.

In 2023 Petrie returned to The Fat Duck as global culinary director.

=== Television and media ===
Petrie was culinary producer on Next Level Chef for Fox, culinary director on Gordon Ramsay's Future Food Stars and was the blue team sous-chef to Gordon Ramsay on screen on Hell's Kitchen seasons 17 and 18 broadcast on Fox and later on ITV in the UK.

Petrie has appeared on Heston's Fantastical Food, Big Chef Takes On Little Chef, Mission Impossible, Heston's Feasts, The One Show, and as both featured mentor and regular guest judge on BBC Masterchef and Masterchef: The Professionals.

Petrie appears as panel member on BBC Radio 4's The Kitchen Cabinet presented by Jay Rayner. He has contributed to food publications Ramsay in 10, In Search of Perfection, The Big Fat Duck Cookbook, Patisserie and Dessert Magazine, In The Mix and Where Chefs Eat. He has been featured in The Guardian, Observer Food Monthly and as the cover features in Restaurant and Chef Magazine.

== Personal life ==
Petrie is married to Irish-born violinist and singer Úna Palliser. They have two daughters
