= Snail porridge =

Porridge dish

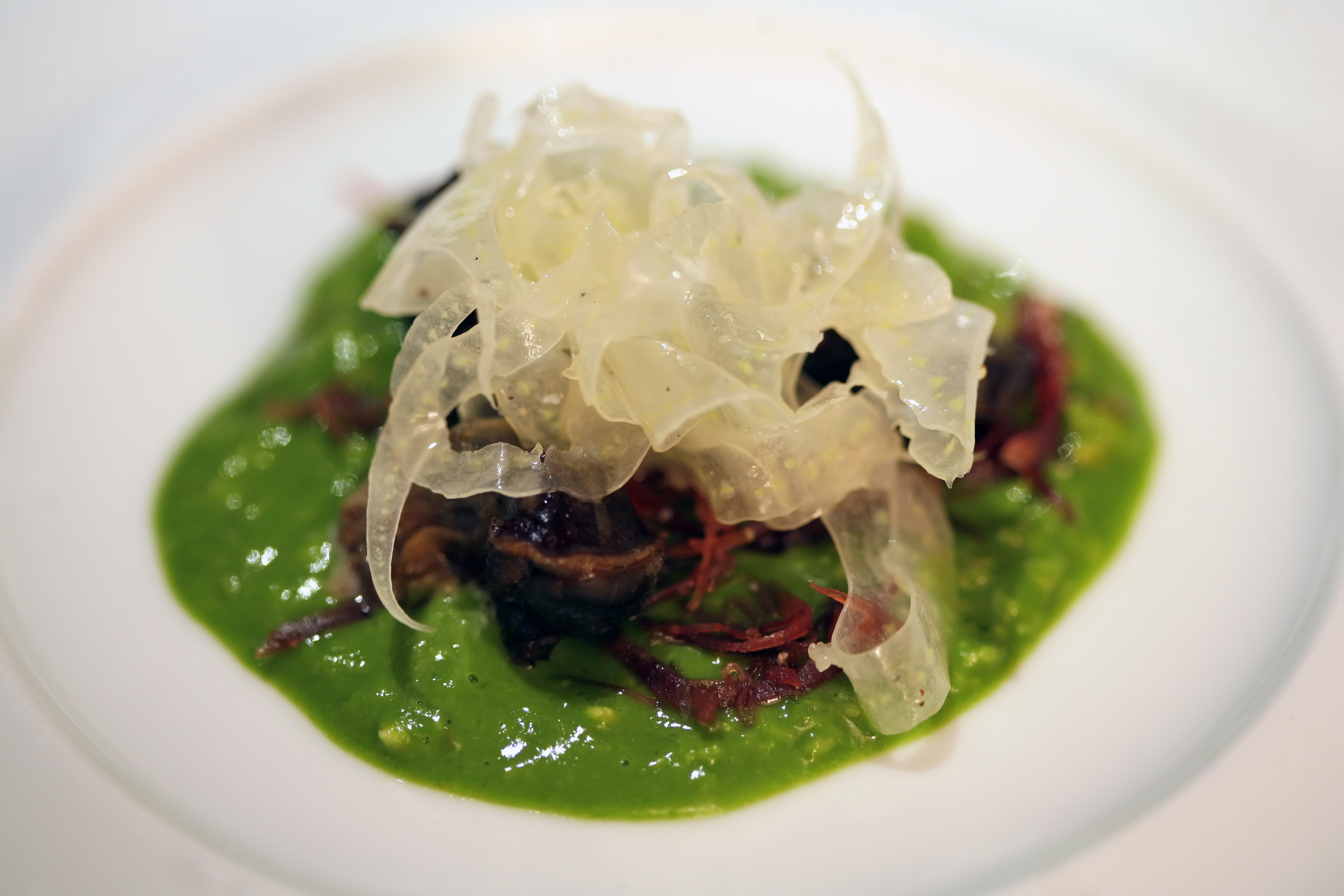
- Snail Porridge at The Fat Duck
- Course: Starter
- Created by: Heston Blumenthal
- Invented: 2003

Snail porridge is a dish created by the English chef Heston Blumenthal, consisting of snails served over a bright-green oat and barley porridge.

== Preparation ==
Snail porridge is made by cooking snails in a herb-and-chicken stock over several hours. After braising, they are sautéed in butter, chopped, and briskly worked into the porridge with a compound butter of parsley, garlic, almonds, ham, shallots and porcini. A recipe warns: "be careful, if it's too hot the butter will split, causing the porridge to become grainy". Finally, a topping of walnut-oil vinaigrette and fine shreds of fennel and jamón ibérico is added.

All in, snail porridge uses 26 ingredients. Blumenthal recommends it as a starter.

== History ==
Blumenthal first served snail porridge in 2003, at his Berkshire restaurant The Fat Duck. Blumenthal narrates the creation of snail porridge in his 2008 book The Big Fat Duck Cookbook, describing it as the product of serendipity. In his telling, snail porridge was created on the day the first shipment of snails arrived from Tony Vaughan, a snail producer in Hertfordshire who worked out of Nissen huts. Vaughan raised large Helix pomatia, or Roman snails, which Blumenthal described as "succulent, with a balanced, clean flavour and delicate texture".

As he experimented with dishes using these snails, Blumenthal talked to Garrey Dawson, who was then head chef at the restaurant and had just returned from a trip to New York. Dawson recounted eating a "fish porridge" there, referring to the Chinese rice porridge congee. Although Blumenthal did not understand what Dawson meant, he found the idea of a porridge served outside the context of breakfast inspiring and thought the fishy taste of the snails he had on-hand well-suited.

The dish quickly gained considerable attention among the public and press. By November 2003 Blumenthal would describe the dish as "something of a Fat Duck classic", while a 2008 article in the Guardian described the dish as "infamous". The stir caused by snail porridge was discussed by the authors Charles Spence and Betina Piqueras-Fiszman, who credited the name and to a lesser extent colour. Spence wrote elsewhere that "Had he given this dish a French name ('Escargots à la Something'), no one would have batted an eyelid". Blumenthal gave the same assessment in a 2015 interview with The Daily Telegraph, saying that "if I’d called it oat risotto with garlic butter and snails it wouldn’t have had the same impact."

Through snail porridge and bacon and egg ice cream, also served at The Fat Duck, Blumenthal gained a public profile. He includes a recipe in The Big Fat Duck Cookbook (2008), accompanied by an image of a snail making its way across the dish. Snail porridge continued to be served at The Fat Duck until 2014, when the restaurant was shuttered for six months for renovations before returning in 2015 with a new menu. During those six months, The Fat Duck was relocated to Australia, where snail porridge continued to be served. Reflecting on the debate brought about by the dish upon the restaurant's reopening, Blumenthal jokingly called snail porridge "the bane of my existence". The dish is considered to be among Blumenthal's signature dishes.

== See also ==
- Snail as food
- Meat fruit
- Triple-cooked chips

== Sources ==
- Blumenthal, Heston (2008). The Fat Duck Cookbook. London & New York: Bloomsbury. ISBN 978-0-7475-9737-7.
- Brien, Donna Lee (September 2017). "'Something diabolical but delicious': Heston Blumenthal's 'Gothic Horror Feast'". Australasian Journal of Popular Culture. 6 (2): 203–217. doi:10.1386/ajpc.6.2.203_1.
- Jung, Susan (2019). Signature Dishes That Matter. London & New York: Phaidon. ISBN 978-0-7148-7932-1.
- Rousseau, Signe (2012). Food Media: Celebrity Chefs and the Politics of Everyday Interference. London & New York, London: Berg Publishers. ISBN 978-0-85785-052-2.
- Spence, Charles; Piqueras-Fiszman, Betina (2014). The Perfect Meal: The Multisensory Science of Food and Dining. Chichester, West Sussex, UK: John Wiley & Sons. ISBN 978-1-118-49082-2.
- Spence, Charles (2017). Gastrophysics: The Science of Dining. London: Penguin Books. ISBN 978-0-241-27008-0.
