= Heston's Fantastical Food =

- Genre: Cooking
- Directed by: Jay Taylor
- Presented by: Heston Blumenthal
- Theme music composer: Ben Parsons
- Country of origin: United Kingdom
- Original language: English
- No. of seasons: 1
- No. of episodes: 7

Production
- Executive producer: Jenny Byrom
- Producer: Natalie Hill
- Production companies: Betty TV and Snail Porridge

Original release
- Network: Channel 4
- Release: 6 November – 19 December 2012

Related
- Heston's Feasts

Heston's Fantastical Food is a television cookery program starring chef Heston Blumenthal which broadcast on Channel 4 in the UK from 6 November to 19 December 2012. The programme follows Blumenthal as he supersizes a variety of food for presentation to members of the public.

== Description ==
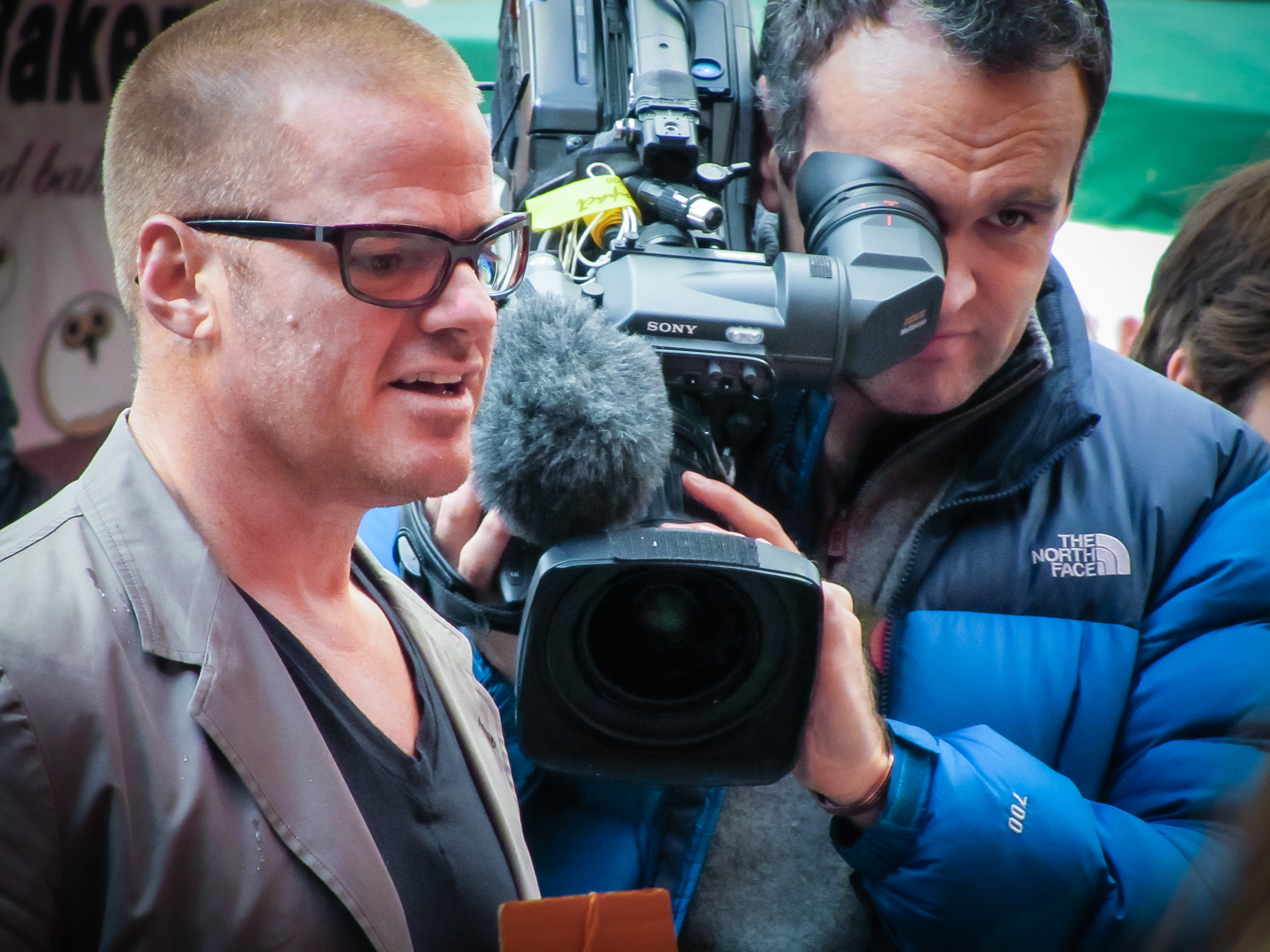
Chef Heston Blumenthal sought to produce supersized versions of day to day food items.

The premise of the show was for Heston Blumenthal, chef-patron of the Michelin starred restaurants The Fat Duck, Dinner by Heston Blumenthal and The Hinds Head, to supersize a variety of food on themed episodes in order to excite the public. These challenges included creating a pub out of pies which included an arch made from pastry, and a cone which would hold one tonne of ice cream. A variety of research was conducted by the research team behind the programme, which included proving that biscuits tasted better after they had been dunked in tea.

The show was produced by production company Betty TV for Channel 4, with the titles and bumpers designed by Pete&Tom, and theme music by Ben Parsons. Channel 4 were sold on the premise of a world record attempt in each episode.

== Reception ==
The first episode of Heston's Fantastical Food had two million viewers on Channel 4, beating Dara Ó Briain's Science Club, the first episode of which was broadcast at the same time on BBC Two.

John Crace of The Guardian thought that Heston's Fantastical Food was too similar to his previous Channel 4 outings, describing him as a "flatscreen one-trick wonder". He felt that the show had been padded out from twenty minutes to an hour and found it conceited that Blumenthal was doing something useful. Tim Dowling reviewed the second episode, also for The Guardian saying that "Heston's mission suffered from a woolliness of intent that made it hard to justify the grandeur of the project". Benji Wilson of The Daily Telegraph gave the show 2/5 stars, and said that the "show is messy and mildly repellent because it asks us to take food, both the cooking and the eating of it, seriously, yet it does so with a series of glib stunts". The Metro was equally critical in its review, saying that it "came across as a self-indulgent game", and that it "was more of a bizarre bid to get in the Guinness World Records book than anything you might call cooking". However it described the Christmas episode as something which "promises to be fun".

== Episodes ==
No.	Title	Original release date	Viewers (millions)
1	"Heston's Big Breakfast"	6 November 2012	2.01
Heston creates an enormous Full breakfast, a giant boiled egg filled with mango and a breakfast on a steam train for commuters.
2	"The Sky High '99"	13 November 2012	1.04
To order to revive the ice cream truck, in Gloucester, Heston creates a five meter tall 99 Flake weighing in at over a tonne, and paintballs to fire at it which taste of popular ice cream flavours from the 1980s.
3	"Blumenthal's Big Brew"	20 November 2012	1.44
Heston makes a massive packet of biscuits and tetrahedral tea bag alongside a drink containing Victoria sponge and cucumber sandwiches.
4	"Heston and the Giant Sweet Factory"	27 November 2012	1.3
Inspired by Roald Dahl's Charlie and the Chocolate Factory, Heston creates a giant sweet shop in Chesterfield including massive Rolos, Liquorice Allsorts and jelly babies.
5	"The Pub in a Pie"	4 December 2012	1.7
Blumenthal creates a pub made of pies in the Welsh village of Minera, massive pork scratchings and a pool table made of fish and tartar sauce with pickled eggs for balls.
6	"The Massive Lunch Box"	11 December 2012	2.01
Heston creates enormous Hula Hoops, giant Kit Kats, and a huge carton of Um Bongo in order to inspire the wonder in adults from a packed lunch.
7	"Heston's Fantastical Christmas"	19 December 2012	1.82
Heston makes edible Christmas tree decorations from pig's head, and a Christmas pudding large enough to walk inside.
