= Signature dish =

Recipe that identifies an individual chef or restaurant

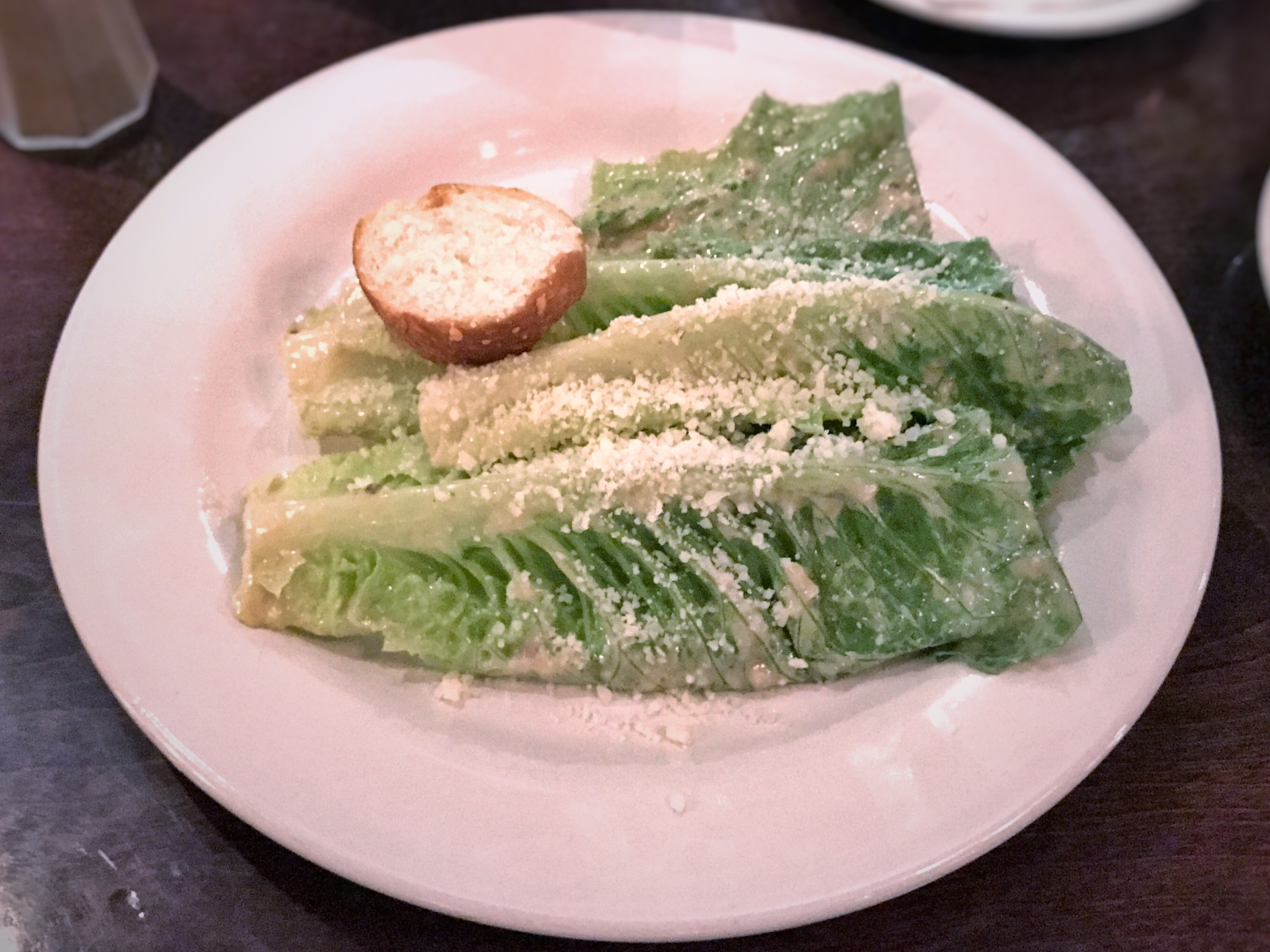
The signature caesar salad served at Caesar's

A signature dish is a recipe that identifies an individual chef or restaurant. Ideally, it should be unique and allow an informed gastronome to name the chef in a blind tasting. It can be thought of as the culinary equivalent of an artist finding their own style, or an author finding their own voice. In practice, a chef's signature dish often changes with time, or they may claim several signature dishes.

In a broader sense, a signature dish may become associated with a particular restaurant, especially if the chef who created it is no longer with the establishment. It can also be used to refer to a culinary region, in which case its meaning may be the equivalent of "national dish". In many cases, restaurants base their menu development on tastes and styles unique to their geographical location.

At its weakest, the term can mean "chef's specials". Under this definition, they are in no way unique or even particularly unusual.

== Examples ==
- Franz Sacher - Sachertorte
- Albert Roux - Soufflé Suissesse
- Gordon Ramsay - Beef wellington and Cappuccino of white beans with grated truffles
- Heston Blumenthal - Snail porridge
- Fergus Henderson - Roast bone marrow with parsley salad
- Daniel Boulud - Crisp paupiettes of sea bass in Barolo sauce
- The Waldorf-Astoria Hotel, New York City - Waldorf salad
- Hotel Tatin, Lamotte-Beuvron, France - Tarte Tatin

== See also ==
- List of restaurant terminology
