= Jocky Petrie =

Jocky Petrie may refer to:

- Jocky Petrie (chef), British chef
- Jocky Petrie (footballer) (1860s–?), Scottish football player
