= Úna Palliser =

Irish musician

Una Palliser
- Born: Úna Palliser; Cork, Ireland
- Genres: Classical, Balkan, Rock, Irish Folk
- Occupation: musician
- Instruments: violin, viola, voice, strohviol, piano, accordion
- Years active: 2002–present

Úna Palliser is an Irish-born, London-based violinist, violist, singer and multi-instrumentalist who is recognised for her proficiency in musical genres including rock, jazz, Balkan and Irish folk. She has performed as guest soloist with London Chamber Orchestra, Prague Pilsen Philharmonic Orchestra and Philharmonia Orchestra, and featured soloist on tour with artists including Shakira, A. R. Rahman, Fun Lovin’ Criminals and Otis Taylor (musician) She is solo vocalist on soundtracks including Mo Ghile Mear on the Specsavers 'Collie Wobble' advertisement. Herself (film), Obi-Wan Kenobi (TV series), My Mother and Other Strangers and Kat and Alfie: Redwater. Palliser is the violist in the Balanescu Quartet.

== Early life and education ==
Palliser was born in Cork, Ireland where she began learning the violin at 4 years old at the Cork School of Music. She also studied piano and viola and later was a member of the European Union Youth Orchestra under Vladimir Ashkenazy. Palliser won a scholarship to the Royal Academy of Music in London where she studied with Garfield Jackson of the Endellion Quartet for four years before graduating with an honours degree in performance.

== Career ==
Palliser has been the viola player in the Balanescu Quartet since 2023, touring and performing in concert halls around Europe.

In 2022 Palliser performed as soloist with the London Chamber Orchestra at St John's, Smith Square in London and has subsequently collaborated as ensemble leader and soloist with the orchestra on a number of other projects. The same year she performed as violin soloist with Philharmonia Orchestra and Philharmonia Chorus at Royal Festival Hall London, as part of the premiere of Outlander (TV series) series 6, playing the score composed by Bear McCreary. The concert was conducted by James Shearman

In 2010-11 Palliser was invited to perform as feature solo violinist on Shakira's The Sun Comes Out World Tour where she also sang back up vocals as well as played the accordion, whistles and strohviol.

Palliser performed as guest violin soloist with Indian composer and singer A.R. Rahman at Wembley Arena in July 2017 to celebrate 25 years of his music, later touring a soloist with Rahman in New York, Australia, New Zealand and Canada.

Palliser has worked in theatre as a musician, actor-musician, singer, composer and musical director, appearing in productions at Shakespeare's Globe Sam Wanamaker Playhouse, Royal National Theatre London’s West End and Broadway.

Palliser has recorded and performed with artists including George Michael, Ariana Grande, Robbie Williams Dionne Warwick, Liam Gallagher, and Elbow.She has performed on television shows including Later With Jools Holland, Late Night with Conan O'Brien, Top of the Pops and Friday Night with Jonathan Ross and appeared in music videos with Mark Ronson, Richard Ashcroft and Josh Groban. Palliser has also recorded on film and television scores including The Lovely Bones, Wuthering Heights The Princess, Obi-Wan Kenobi, The Decameron (TV series) , Endeavour, Emancipation, Grace (TV series) , Three Girls, The Cube, and Hold the Sunset.

She has toured as part of Cee-lo Green and Danger Mouse (musician)'s band Gnarls Barkley, as solo violinist/violist on Patrick Wolf's The Magic Position tour of the US and Europe supporting Amy Winehouse and Arcade Fire. and as featured violist on Take That's Beautiful World Tour 2007.

Palliser also toured as violinist with Moby on his Wait For Me tour., with George Michael on his Symphonica Tour. and Liam Gallagher on his Definitely Maybe tour. Palliser has Dresden Dolls' Amanda Palmer several times as guest solo violinist, also performing with Neil Gaiman. and joined Avalanche City playing violin, glockenspiel, accordion and backing vocals for their UK tour, She has also performed and toured solo violinist with Otis Taylor and toured as backing singer and violinist with Elbow.

Palliser was the featured lead singer and violinist/violist on the single 'Still Resist The Storm' on BBC World Music Award Winner Terrafolk's record Full Circle, which topped the radioplay charts in Slovenia. This led to many years touring and performing internationally as a featured guest artist with Terrafolk and a performance as solo violinist and vocalist with the European Symbolic Orchestra.

She featured in "The Secret Life of Materials", a documentary by Met Films in which she tried out and performed on one of the world's first 3D printed violins.

Palliser has been lead violinist and the solo vocalist for Blade Runner Live since 2019, performing Vangelis score of Blade Runner as the part of Avex International's premiere production of Blade Runner Live film live musicians including at The Royal Albert Hall.. She is also singer for [[Avatar]] Live, performing all three solo vocal parts from the film live with symphony orchestra and choir. She performed as soloist for this with Prague Pilson Philharmonic Orchestra in 2025 in Prague O2 Arena.

Palliser has been described as an 'extraordinary violinist' by the UK's The Independent newspaper. and her voice has been described as 'haunting' by both Metro and Songlines.

=== Recorded vocals ===
Palliser’s vocals have featured on Natalie Holt’s score for Obi-Wan Kenobi (TV series), part of the Star Wars franchise, also on the soundtrack of 2020 film Herself (film) directed by Phyllida Lloyd singing her arrangement of Irish ballad Lass of Aughrim. She is the solo Irish singer on the end credits of BBC six part tv series My Mother and Other Strangers and the singer of the theme tune for BBC series Kat and Alfie: Redwater. Palliser's recording of the Irish folk song "Mo Ghile Mear" has been used on the Specsavers 'Sheep' advert since 2008. She also appears as solo vocalist on Joglaresa’s Christmas album ‘Sing We Yule’ with her version of Don Oíche Úd i mBeithil.

Palliser is the lead singer and violinist in the four-member band Una & the Balkan Bears performing Ronnie Scott's Jazz Club in London in 2010. She is long standing member of Gypsy Dreamers band, as singer & violinist, releasing their second album ‘Big Sky’ in 2025.

== Personal life ==
Palliser lives in London. She is married to Scottish chef James 'Jocky' Petrie. They have two daughters. Her brother Conor Palliser is a conductor and pianist.
