= Suzanne Pirret =

American actress

Suzanne Louise Pirret is an American food writer and voiceover artist. She is the author of 'The Pleasure is All Mine: Selfish Food for Modern Life', and has written for UK publications such as The Observer, Women's Health, Men's Health and London's The Evening Standard.

== Early life and education ==
Suzanne Pirret was born in Princeton, New Jersey and raised in Somers, New York. She graduated from Syracuse University with a BA in International Relations and from Harvard University's Institute for Advanced Theater Training at The American Repertory Theater. In 2003 she received the Grand Diplôme from Le Cordon Bleu in Paris and London.

== Career ==
Voiceover Artist: Pirret's career as a voiceover artist in New York, Los Angeles and London includes hundreds of television and radio commercials, promos, documentaries, animation, and ADR. Credits include Dove, American Express, Elizabeth Arden, Pond's, Blistex, Mercedes-Benz and Priceline.com with William Shatner and has worked with directors including Nancy Meyers and John Frankenheimer.

Chef: Her first job as a professional chef was at the age of fifteen in New York. She worked in various restaurants in New York City and in 2003 as pastry chef at Fifteen, Jamie Oliver’s not-for-profit restaurant in London that was the subject of Channel 4's television documentary series Jamie's Kitchen.

Author: In 2009 Pirret's book, 'The Pleasure is All Mine: Selfish Food for Modern Life' was published by HarperCollins to critical acclaim, offering '100 decadent meals you can cook for one'. The Wall Street Journal called it 'a collection of excellent recipes for one' presented with 'self-deprecating humor and a keen understanding of good cooking,' The Daily Telegraph 'more Anthony Bourdain than Nigella Lawson', Richard Vines at Bloomberg 'fabulous cooking', Marie Claire, 'a wickedly funny manifesto for the hungry single girl' and Library Journal that 'even if you are not single and don't like to cook, this is an entertaining book.' Bobby Flay wrote 'I couldn't put this book down! Everyone will be begging to be a guest or even a dishwasher in Suzanne Pirret's kitchen after reading and cooking from The Pleasure Is All Mine. She's infectious!' The Washington Post described its recipes as 'intoxicatingly indulgent'; they were also featured in Men's Health (magazine) and The Observer which used many of the recipes in its '100 easiest, fastest recipes ever'. Publishers Weekly hailed the book's trailer as 'generating significant media buzz'. Broadcasting includes BBC Radio 4's Midweek programme, The Splendid Table on American Public Media and cooking demonstrations.

== Personal life ==
Pirret lives in London. She was in a relationship with Heston Blumenthal between 2011 and 2015.
