= Heston Blumenthal =

English chef (born 1966)

Heston Blumenthal OBE HonFRSC
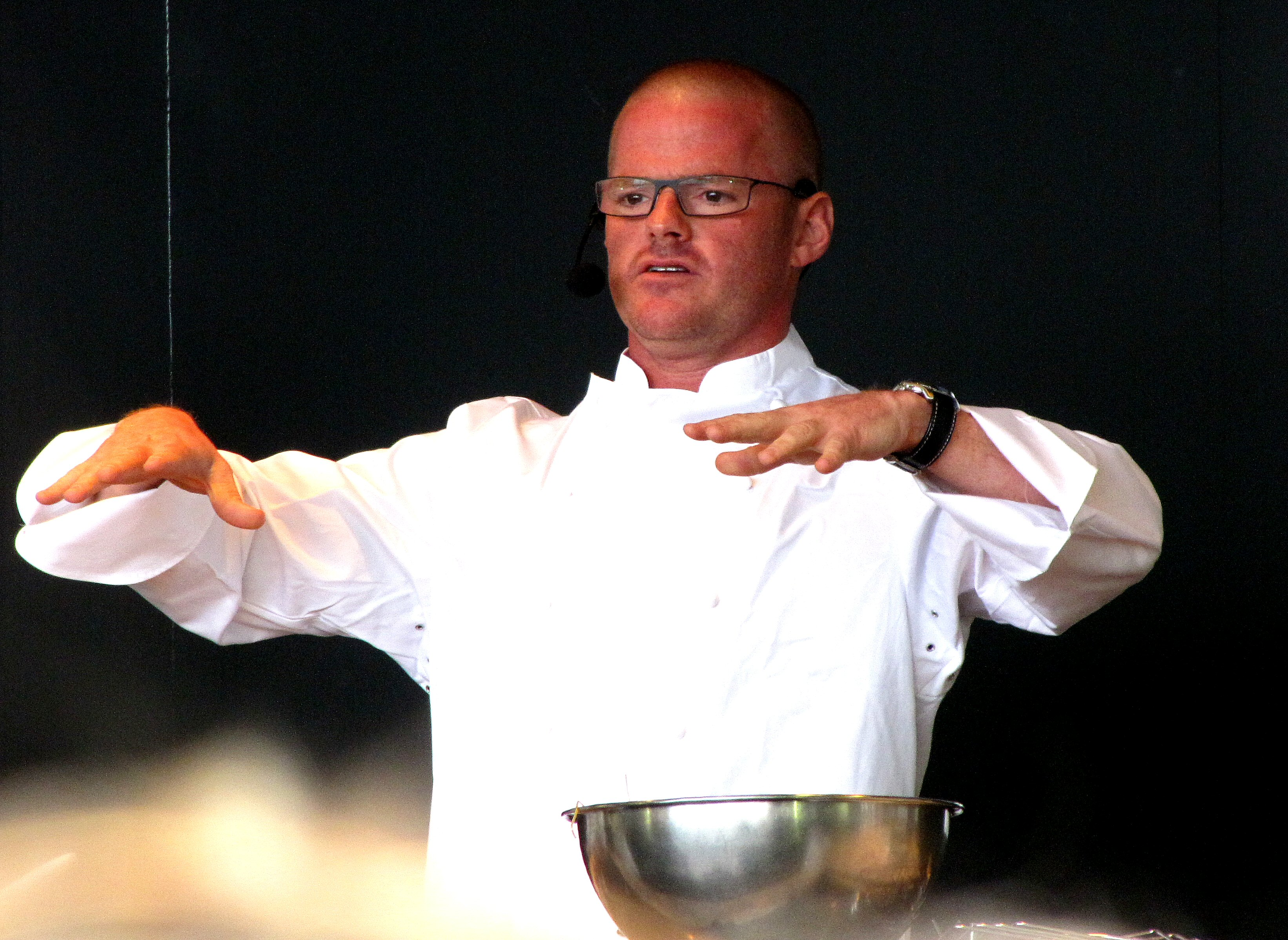
- Blumenthal in 2010
- Born: Heston Marc Blumenthal; 27 May 1966 (age 60); Shepherd's Bush, London, England
- Spouse(s): Melanie Ceysson Blumenthal (2023–), Zanna Blumenthal (1989–2017)
- Culinary career
- Cooking style: Multisensory gastronomy; Molecular gastronomy; Nouvelle Cuisine; British
- Ratings
- Michelin stars AA Rosettes; Good Food Guide
- Current restaurants
- The Fat Duck; Dinner by Heston Blumenthal; Dinner by Heston Blumenthal (Dubai); The Hinds Head
- Previous restaurant
- The Perfectionists' Cafe The Crown at Bray
- Television shows
- Heston's Great British Food; Kitchen Chemistry; In Search of Perfection; Crazy Delicious; Big Chef Takes on Little Chef; Heston's Feasts; How To Cook Like Heston; Heston's Fantastical Food; Heston's Mission Impossible; Inside Heston's World
- Website: hestonblumenthal.com thefatduck.co.uk

Heston Marc Blumenthal OBE HonFRSC (/ˈbluːmənθɔːl/; born 27 May 1966) is an English celebrity chef, television personality and food writer. His restaurants include the Fat Duck in Bray, Berkshire, a three-Michelin-star restaurant that was named the world's best by the World's 50 Best Restaurants in 2005.

Blumenthal is regarded as a pioneer of multi-sensory cooking, food pairing and flavour encapsulation. He came to public attention with unusual recipes such as bacon-and-egg ice cream and snail porridge. His recipes for triple-cooked chips and soft-centred Scotch eggs have been widely imitated. He has advocated a scientific approach to cooking, for which he has been awarded honorary degrees from the universities of Reading, Bristol and London and made an honorary fellow of the Royal Society of Chemistry.

Blumenthal's public profile was boosted by a number of television series, most notably for Channel 4, as well as a product range for the Waitrose supermarket chain introduced in 2010. Blumenthal also owns Dinner, a two-Michelin-star restaurant in London, and a one-Michelin-star pub in Bray, the Hind's Head.

Blumenthal has attention deficit hyperactivity disorder, a condition he believes made him hyper-focused on his work, and bipolar disorder. He is an ambassador for the charity Bipolar UK.

== Early life ==
Heston Marc Blumenthal was born in Shepherd's Bush, a suburb of West London, on 27 May 1966, to a Jewish businessman born in Southern Rhodesia and an English mother, a secretary, who converted to Judaism. His surname comes from a great-grandfather from Latvia and means "flowered valley" (or "bloom-dale") in German. His mother was often angry and unloving, calling him "useless" and "stupid", and never acknowledged his later achievements. Blumenthal was raised in Paddington, and attended Latymer Upper School in Hammersmith; St John's Church of England School in Lacey Green, Buckinghamshire; and John Hampden Grammar School, High Wycombe.

Blumenthal's interest in cooking began at the age of sixteen on a family holiday to Provence, France, when he was taken to the three-Michelin-star restaurant L'Oustau de Baumanière. He was inspired by the quality of the food and "the whole multi-sensory experience: the sound of fountains and cicadas, the heady smell of lavender, the sight of the waiters carving lamb at the table". When he learned to cook, he was influenced by the cookbook series Les recettes originales, with French chefs such as Alain Chapel.

Blumenthal left school at eighteen and began an apprenticeship at Raymond Blanc's Le Manoir aux Quat' Saisons, but left after a week's probation. Over the following ten years, he worked as a credit controller and repo man while teaching himself the French classical repertoire. A pivotal moment came when reading On Food and Cooking: the Science and Lore of the Kitchen by Harold McGee in the mid-1980s. This challenged kitchen practices such as searing meat to seal in the juices, and encouraged Blumenthal to "adopt a totally different attitude towards cuisine that at its most basic boiled down to: question everything".

== Career ==
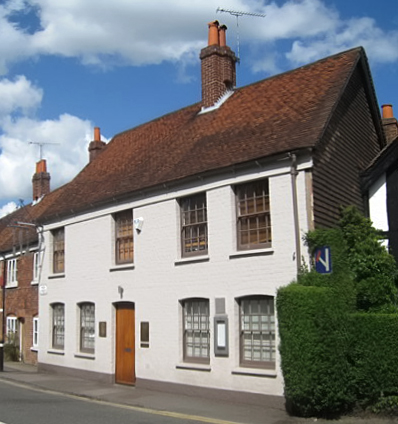
The Fat Duck, Bray

In 1995, Blumenthal bought a run-down pub in Bray, Berkshire, the Ringers, and re-opened it as the Fat Duck. It was initially staffed only by Blumenthal and a dishwasher. It served meals in the style of a French bistro, such as lemon tarts and steak and chips. Science had begun to influence the cooking at this stage, as already on the menu were Blumenthal's triple-cooked chips, developed to stop the potato from going soft. The Fat Duck came close to bankruptcy, and Blumenthal sold his house, car and many possessions to keep it open.

After four years, the Fat Duck was awarded its first Michelin star in 1999. In 2001, it was awarded a second Michelin star and was named restaurant of the year by the Automobile Association. In 2002, Blumenthal opened a second restaurant in Bray, the Riverside Brasserie, selling many of the Fat Duck's earlier dishes at reduced prices. The Guardian critic Jay Rayner gave it a positive review, describing it as "truly stunning value". In 2004, Blumenthal's share of the Riverside Brasserie was purchased by the chef Garrey Dawson.

In 2004, three UK restaurants received Michelin Stars, the Fat Duck, the Waterside Inn, also in Bray, and Restaurant Gordon Ramsay in London. At the time he received his third star, Blumenthal said it was the closest he had been to bankruptcy, with enough money only to cover the following week's staff wages. Blumenthal acquired the Hind's Head, also in Bray, in 2004. The building was a 15th-century tavern; it now serves traditional seasonal cuisine and historic British dishes. In 2011, it was named the Michelin Pub Guide's Pub of the Year.

In January 2011, Blumenthal opened his first restaurant outside Bray, Dinner, at the Mandarin Oriental Hyde Park, London. Historians helped to develop the restaurant's dishes from historic British recipes. Dinner was awarded its first Michelin star in 2012, and was voted the seventh-best restaurant in the world in 2013. It received a second Michelin star in 2014.

In June 2014, Blumenthal announced a new restaurant, the Perfectionists' Cafe, in Heathrow Airport. In 2015, the Fat Duck was temporarily relocated to Melbourne, Australia, while the Bray restaurant was refurbished. Upon reaching the end of its temporary opening, the restaurant became a permanent Melbourne branch of Dinner, although not owned by Blumenthal.

=== Television ===
In 2002, Blumenthal made a series of six half-hour television programmes, Kitchen Chemistry with Heston Blumenthal, which was transmitted on Discovery Science along with a book Kitchen Chemistry, published by the Royal Society of Chemistry During 2004–07, he presented two BBC series called Heston Blumenthal: In Search of Perfection and Heston Blumenthal: Further Adventures In Search of Perfection.

Blumenthal moved from the BBC to Channel 4 in March 2008, joining the celebrity chefs Jamie Oliver, Hugh Fearnley-Whittingstall and Gordon Ramsay. In January 2009, a three-part series of television programmes on Channel 4 covered his efforts to revamp the struggling Little Chef roadside restaurant chain, using a trial location on the A303 road at Popham. Little Chef extended Blumenthal's menu to 12 branches, but removed them in 2013.

In March 2009, Blumenthal presented a television series, Heston's Feasts, showing themed dinner banquets. A second series began in 2010. From 22 February 2011, Channel 4 began airing Heston's Mission Impossible, in which he attempts to improve lacklustre food served in various industries. In January 2012, How To Cook Like Heston aired on Channel 4. It was aimed at home cooks and featured some of the more approachable techniques employed by Blumenthal.

In November 2012, Blumenthal presented the Channel 4 programm Heston's Fantastical Food. He presented a new 2014 series, Heston's Great British Food, again commissioned by Channel 4. In 2020, Blumenthal appeared as a judge in the Channel 4 series Crazy Delicious hosted by Jayde Adams, alongside chefs Niklas Ekstedt and Carla Hall. In 2021, he was a judge in the French version of Top Chef, proposing a food pairing test. In July 2022, he was a guest judge on the final episode of the Australian Masterchef.

=== Waitrose ===
In 2010, Blumenthal entered a partnership to create products for the supermarket chain Waitrose. Blumenthal's initial products were unsuccessful, but his Christmas pudding with an embedded orange, released in 2010, sold out quickly and were sold on eBay for hundreds of pounds. His other products included a bloody Mary prawn cocktail, sherry-and-balsamic vinegar Christmas pudding, and puff pastry mince pies with pine sugar dusting. The range inspired unusual products from other supermarkets, such as a Christmas pudding with popping candy and chilli chocolate sauce from Aldi. In 2023, Waitrose ended its contract with Blumenthal, seeking to focus on its in-house range. A source from Waitrose described Blumenthal as "unpredictable".

== Cooking methods ==
He has experimented with food pairing, in which recipes are created by identifying molecular similarities between different ingredients and bringing these together in a dish. One of the first such was Blumenthal's white chocolate with caviar. He created unusual combinations, including Roast Foie Gras "Benzaldehyde" and salmon poached in a liquorice gel accompanied by asparagus. While many of these unexpected combinations have been critically well received, Blumenthal himself has pointed out the limitations of such an approach, insisting that although foodpairing is a good tool for creativity, it is still no substitute for the chef's culinary intuition. ‘The molecular profile of a single ingredient is so complex that even if it has several compounds in common with another, there are still as many reasons why they won't work together as reasons why they will.’

=== Statement on the "new cookery" ===
From the late 1990s, scientific understanding, precision and technology became characteristic of modern cuisine, in so-called "molecular gastronomy". On 10 December 2006 Blumenthal and Harold McGee published a "Statement on the 'New Cookery'" in the Observer to summarise the tenets of this cuisine. In it they emphasise that openness to novel techniques and ingredients can be used as a means to achieve excellent dishes, but they value tradition. Novel techniques and ingredients should only be used when they contribute to a dish. For example, liquid nitrogen should not be used for the sake of novelty. And that progress can come from collaboration, for example with chemists and psychologists.

=== Multi-sensory cooking ===
Blumenthal calls his scientific approach to cuisine "multi-sensory cooking", arguing that eating is "one of the few activities we do that involves all of the senses simultaneously". One of the catalysts for this culinary approach was a visit at 16 to the restaurant L'Oustau de Baumanière in Provence, which at the time had three Michelin stars. The trip prompted a passion for cooking, above all because of "the whole multisensory experience: the sound of fountains and cicadas, the heady smell of lavender, the sight of the waiters carving lamb at the table". One of the other main inspirations for a multi-sensory style of cooking was the lack of space and opulence at the Fat Duck. "Places like the Baumaniere had a view and a history and architecture that took its diners to a world of beauty and indulgence. The Fat Duck didn't have any of that, so it had had to capture the diners’ imagination in a different way – taking them to the mysteries of flavour perception and multi sensory delight."

The event that cemented Heston's interest in this area was his creation of a crab ice cream to accompany a crab risotto. "People had difficulty accepting crab ice cream, yet if it was renamed 'frozen crab bisque', people found it more acceptable and less sweet." The phenomenon was subsequently researched by Martin Yeomans and Lucy Chambers of the University of Sussex, who served test subjects a version of Blumenthal's ice cream flavoured with smoked salmon, but told one group they would be tasting ice cream and the other that they would be tasting a frozen savoury mousse. Although all consumed identical food, those eating what they thought was savoury mousse found the flavour acceptable while those eating what they thought was ice cream found the taste salty and generally disgusting. For Blumenthal, this confirmed his ideas. "If something as simple as a name could make a dish appear more or less salty ... what effect might other cues have on flavours and our appreciation of them?"

Since that point, exploring the sensory potential of food – via both research and the creation of new dishes – has been an ongoing and characteristic strand of Heston's cooking. In 2004, working on a commission for the photographer Nick Knight, he created a Delice of Chocolate containing popping candy and took the imaginative step of arranging for diners to listen on headphones to the little explosions it made as they ate – the first time such a thing had been done. With Professor Charles Spence, head of the Crossmodal Research Laboratory at Oxford University he has conducted several experiments into how our sense of sound can affect perception of flavour. In one experiment, test subjects consumed an oyster in two-halves: the first half was accompanied by maritime sounds, the second by farmyard sounds, and they were then asked to rate pleasantness and intensity of flavour. It was found that oysters eaten while listening to seaside sounds were considered significantly more pleasant. In another, similar experiment, test subjects tasted bacon-and-egg ice cream while listening to sounds of bacon sizzling, followed by tasting it while listening to the sound of chickens clucking. The sizzling bacon sound made the bacon flavour appear more intense.

In Blumenthal's view, experiments such as these show that our appreciation of food is subjective, determined by information sent by the senses to the brain: "the ways in which we make sense of what we are eating and decide whether we like it or not depend to a large extent on memory and contrast. Memory provides us with a range of references – flavours, tastes, smells, sights, sounds, emotions – that we draw on continually as we eat." His dishes, therefore, tend to be designed to appeal to the senses in concert, and through this to trigger memories, associations and emotions. Thus the Nitro-poached Green Tea and Lime Mousse on the Fat Duck menu is served with spritz of ‘lime grove’ scent from an atomiser; and the Jelly of Quail dish includes among its tableware a bed of oak moss, as well as being accompanied by a specially created scent of oak moss that is dispersed at the table by means of dry ice.

The most complete expression to date of his multisensory philosophy, however, is probably the dish ‘Sound of the Sea’, which first appeared on the Fat Duck menu in 2007. In this, ingredients with a distinctly oceanic character and flavour – dried kelp, hijiki seaweed, baby eels, razor clams, cockles, mussels, sea urchins – are fashioned into a course that has the appearance of the shore's edge, complete with sea ‘spume’ and edible sand. It is served on a glass-topped box containing real sand, and accompanied by headphones relaying the sounds of seagulls and the sea by means of a small iPod (placed in a conch shell) and earphones. The idea, according to Blumenthal, was one ‘of creating a world, of transporting the diner – through sound, through food, through an integrated appeal to the senses – to another place’.

=== Signature dishes ===
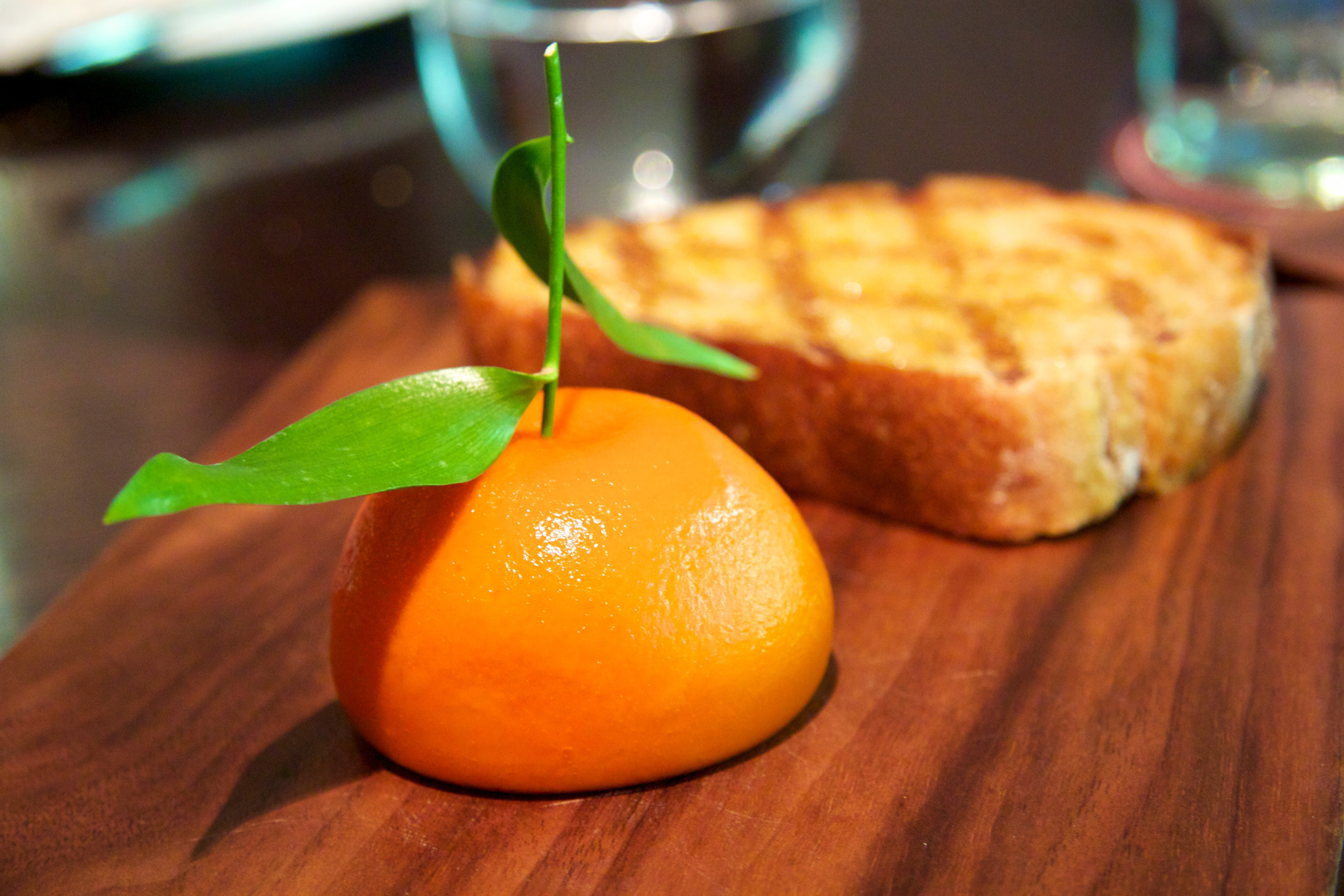
Meat fruit, a chicken liver mousse created to look like a mandarin orange, served in Blumenthal's Dinner restaurant in London

Blumenthal's most famous signature dishes include triple-cooked chips, snail porridge, bacon-and-egg ice cream and parsnip cereal, mock turtle soup (which combines a multi-sensory experience with historical references), Meat Fruit, and his Sweet Shop petit fours.

He has pioneered the use of sound as part of the dining experience with his Sound of the Sea dish where diners listen to a recording of the seaside – crashing waves with occasional sounds of distant seagulls, children's laughter and the horn of a ship, while they eat a dish of king fish, konbu cured halibut, ballotine of mackerel with 5 different seaweeds, sea jelly beans and monks beard served on "sand" made from tapioca starch, toasted Japanese breadcrumbs, miso paste and dried seaweeds.

Blumenthal is also known for his use of scented dry ice. Blumenthal and his restaurant "The Fat Duck" have been credited as instigators of the bacon dessert "craze". He was preparing sweet and savoury bacon-and-egg ice cream as early as 2004, and news "about the intriguingly odd confection quickly spread through the food world".

=== Historic influences ===
Blumenthal uses British history in his dishes. He became interested in historical cooking in the late 1990s upon obtaining a copy of The Vivendier, a translation of a fifteenth-century cookery manuscript that contained unusual recipes, such as a chicken that appears roasted but wakes up as it is served. He said "I'd had little idea the cooking of the past could be so playful, audacious and creative."

Following this, he attended an Oxford Symposium of Food and Cookery where he met the food historians Richard Fitch (who works for Historic Royal Palaces) and Marc Meltonville. Later he met a third food historian, Ivan Day and, in consultation with these three, began developing dishes inspired by recipes in historical British cookbooks. The first completed dish based on a historic recipe was Quaking Pudding, which is now on the menu at the Hinds Head. This was followed by Beef Royal and Chocolate Wine, which featured on the Fat Duck menu. The opening of Dinner by Heston Blumenthal presented him with far greater scope for historical cooking, and its menu is composed solely of dishes inspired by the recipes of the past. His 2013 book Historic Heston is a collection of historical recipes that have appeared on the menus of Dinner by Heston Blumenthal, the Fat Duck and the Hinds Head.

== Royal patronage ==
In 2009, for a private party held during Ascot week, Blumenthal was invited to cook a meal for Queen Elizabeth II at Windsor Castle. The menu included baked salmon, strawberry gateau and a starter, composed to look like a bowl of fruit, that consisted of offal and sweetbreads. He was selected to provide the picnic meal for participants in Queen's Diamond Jubilee celebrations, and was a guest in the Royal Box at the Queen's Diamond Jubilee concert in June 2012.

== Personal awards ==
In 2004, Blumenthal won the Chef Award at the Catey Awards, joining chefs including Gordon Ramsay, Phil Howard and Raymond Blanc. He has been awarded honorary degrees for his scientific approach to cooking. In July 2006, Blumenthal was presented with an honorary Doctor of Science degree by Reading University in recognition of his unique scientific approach to food and long-standing relationship with the University's School of Food Biosciences. Also in July 2006, Blumenthal was the first chef to be awarded an Honorary Fellowship by the Royal Society of Chemistry. Blumenthal received an honorary Master of Science from Bristol University in 2007. In December 2013, he was presented with an honorary Doctor of Science degree by the University of London, recognising his pioneering research and achievements in his field. In June 2013, the College of Arms granted Blumenthal a personal coat of arms.

=== Chef's awards ===
- Best Restaurant of the Year Award – Decanter, 1998
- Chef of the Year – Good Food Guide, 2001
- AA Guide chef's chef of the year Award – AA Guide Publications 2002
- Catey Awards Restaurateur of the year Award – Caterer & Hotelkeeper, 2003
- Food & Wine Personality of the Year Award – GQ Glenfiddich Awards 2004
- GQ Magazine Chef of the Year – GQ Magazine Man of the Year awards 2004
- GQ Personality of the year – GQ Glenfiddich Awards 2007
- Chef's choice award – San Pellegrino World's 50 Best Restaurant Awards April 2007
- Trophy Gourmand – Austria 2010
- GQ Chef of the Year – GQ Man of the Year Awards 2010/2011
- The Diners Club® Lifetime Achievement Award 2017 at The World's 50 Best Restaurants 2017.
- "Inspiration Chef of the Century" at the Rolling Pin convention in Düsseldorf for his visionary work in the restaurant industry.
- Officially recognized as one of the "Revolucionarios" at Madrid Fusión, the only English chef in this group alongside figures like Ferran Adrià, for his role in international culinary transformation and contribution to molecular gastronomy.
- "The Fabergé Hospitality Legend Award" from the Restaurant Association Awards, honouring his entire career and industry impact.
- Tribute Award of the San Sebastian Gastronomika Euskadi Basque Country Tribute Award, acknowledging his revolutionary role in contemporary culinary history.

=== Television and book awards ===
- Best Cookbook for "Family Food: A New Approach to Cooking" – Gourmand World Cookbook Awards 2003
- Best Children Cookbook for "Family Food: A New Approach to Cooking" – Gourmand World Cookbook Awards 2004
- Best Production "Heston Blumenthal – In Search of Perfection" BBC2 – GQ Glenfiddich Awards 2007* The Guild of Food Writers Awards 2014 – Historic Heston book, Heston and his ghost writer, Pascal Cariss won the prestigious award for on British Food.
- BAFTA nomination in the Features category for "Heston Blumenthal: In Search of Perfection"- British Academy Television Awards 2008
- The Features and Lifestyle Award for Heston's Victorian Feast – The Royal Television Society Awards 2009
- Food Book of the Year for The Big Fat Duck Cookbook – Guild of Food Writers Awards 2009
- Winner of Design and Production Award for The Big Fat Duck Cookbook – British Book Industry Awards 2009
- Winner of Photography Award for The Big Fat Duck Cookbook – James Beard Foundation Awards 2009
- Winner of Design Award for The Big Fat Duck Cookbook – International Association of Culinary Professionals Awards 2009
- BAFTA nomination in the Features category for "FEAST" – British Academy Television Awards 2010

=== Restaurant awards ===
Blumenthal's restaurants have received awards including "Best Restaurant in the World".

== Honours ==
=== Orders ===
In January 2006, Blumenthal was appointed an OBE in the New Years Honours List for his services to British gastronomy.

=== Coat of arms ===
Coat of arms of Heston Blumenthal
Crest A Duck wings elevated and addorsed Or holding in the dexter foot a Magnifying-glass proper the frame and handle Gules and in the beak three Stems of Lavender flowered proper tied Gules. Escutcheon Sable issuant in pall three dexter cubit Arms vested Or each charged with a Rose Gules and cuffed Argent the hands appaumy proper between in chief an Apple slipped and leaved and in base two Lyres Or. Motto Question Everything Badge A Duck's Leg erased à la quise Or.

== Personal life and health ==
Blumenthal is Jewish. He married his first wife, Zanna, in 1989, with whom he had three children. The couple separated in 2011 and divorced in 2017. Blumenthal credited Zanna with helping the Fat Duck succeed, as she cared for their family while he was working. Between 2011 and 2015, Blumenthal was in a relationship with the American food writer Suzanne Pirret. In 2017, he had a daughter with Stephanie Gouveia, a French estate agent he met that year. The family moved to France in 2018. In 2023, Blumenthal announced their separation. Blumenthal married the French entrepreneur Melanie Ceysson in March 2023. As of 2025, they were living in a village in Provence.

In 2017, Blumenthal was diagnosed with ADHD, a condition he believes made him hyper-focused on his work. He said he had used cocaine in an attempt to self-medicate. In November 2023, Blumenthal was sectioned in France following a week-long manic episode, during which he hallucinated that he had a gun, and was diagnosed with bipolar disorder. He spent 20 days on a psychiatric ward and 40 days at a clinic. Following his experience, he became an ambassador for the charity Bipolar UK. BBC Two broadcast a documentary, Heston: My Life With Bipolar, in June 2025.

== Bibliography ==
- Family Food: A New Approach to Cooking (2002)
- In Search of Perfection (2006)
- Further Adventures in Search of Perfection (2007)
- The Fat Duck Cookbook (2008)
- Total Perfection: In Search of Total Perfection (2009)
- Heston's Fantastical Feasts (2010)
- Heston Blumenthal At Home (2011)
- Historic Heston (2013)
- Heston Blumenthal at Home (2015)
- Is This A Cookbook? Adventures in the Kitchen (2022)

Blumenthal has written columns for The Guardian, T2, The Times and GQ. With scientists on the faculty of Reading University, he wrote an academic paper on the flavour of tomatoes, "Differences in Glutamic Acid and 5'-Ribonucleotide Contents between Flesh and Pulp of Tomatoes and the Relationship with Umami Taste".
