= Quaking pudding =

English pudding

Quaking pudding served at the Hind's Head

A quaking or shaking pudding is an English boiled pudding, made by boiling a cloth bag of custard batter in water or meat broth. The dessert is thickened with flour or breadcrumbs, has a creamy texture, and wobbles as it is moved. It is often served with rosewater or a sauce of sack (white fortified wine), sugar and melted butter.

An early reference to quaking pudding appears in Elinor Fettiplace's Receipt Book, a compilation of recipes dated to 1604. It was among the first English puddings cooked in a bag rather than in entrails. Recipes appeared in numerous 17th- and 18th-century cookbooks in Britain, and until the 19th century in the Americas.

== Description ==
Quaking pudding is a sweet pudding, made by cooking a thickened egg-and-cream custard in a cloth bag submerged in boiling water or meat broth. Because the pudding is made by boiling a liquidy custard in a bag, several steps are taken to stop the mixture from seeping out before and during cooking. Early recipes used flour as a thickener, adding only enough to keep the pudding together as it boiled, but not so much that it changes the texture. Later versions often used breadcrumbs as a thickener. The bag is lined with butter or flour, holding the batter in place as it is moved quickly to the water. In several recipes, it is emphasized that the water must be boiling, which allows a skin to quickly form around the custard, sealing in the mixture.

When turned out from the bag it is cooked in, cracks form in the surface. The pudding wobbles as it is moved, and has a creamy texture—Alan Davidson described it as "halfway to being a custard". The English cookery writers Elisabeth Ayrton and Jane Grigson spoke fondly of the quaking pudding. Ayrton called it "the lightest and most delicious of all boiled puddings", while Grigson described it as having "a most unusual and pleasing texture... Cream is the ingredient which transforms these puddings from domestic dullness into real pleasure."

Historical preparations of quaking pudding were often accompanied by a sauce such as rosewater, or a combination of sack, sugar, and melted butter, (Note: The writer Kate Colquhoun identifies this as a predecessor of brandy butter.) although in several early recipes no sauce was given at all. Its exterior could be decorated, studded with pieces of candied peel or sliced almond.

== In Britain ==
The earliest reference to quaking pudding identified by the British food historian Laura Mason came in Elinor Fettiplace's Receipt Book, a compilation of recipes dated 1604. It contained a recipe for "To make a bagge pudinge":

Take thicke Creame and make yt somewhat hotter then bloud warme, then take halfe a dossen egges and beate them well and mingle them wth yor Creame then ad to yt a little parsely and winter savory cut very smale and some nutmegges suger and a little salte then put to yt as much Crumes of bread and fine flower as will make yt thicker then Batter for pan-Cakes, then wett yor bagge in cold water and put yt in and when yor water boyles put him into yt, yt must not bee boyled wth meate but alone in fayre water.

Bagge here likely refers to one made of cloth. (Note: While "bag" appears in some dialects as a term for stomach, Mason writes that the instruction to wet the bag indicates a cloth material.) The use of a cloth bag was a new development in making puddings, representing a less involved and less seasonal approach over older methods of cooking puddings. Previously, puddings had been cooked in a stomach, which was only available when slaughtering and cleaning an animal. Another method of keeping the pudding batter from leaking was offered in The Closet Opened, a 1669 cookbook that purports to be based on the writings of Sir Kenelm Digby. The recipe, for "good Quaking Bag-pudding", calls for the pudding batter to be poured into a wooden barrel, placing a cloth over its mouth, then submerging the container in vigorously boiling water, where it would "turn and rowl up and down in the water, as it gallopeth in boiling". In the years that followed, further references to puddings being cooked in dishes turn up, serving as predecessors of the pudding basin.

A recipe from an English commonplace book, 1692

Joseph Cooper gives a recipe for a "shaking pudding" in The Art of Cookery Refin'd and Augmented (1654), cooked in a buttered and floured cloth bag, and the following decade, mention of a "shaking pudding" is contained in the diaries of Samuel Pepys. Later 17th-century recipes were included in The Ladies Delight (1672) by Hannah Woolley and The Compleat Cook (1680) by Rebecca Price. Woolley's version was unusual. Boiled puddings rarely contained fresh fruit, as their taste became dull over a long boil, but Woolley's contained a pint of whole raspberries, and suggested substituting cowslip flower or gooseberries.

Quaking puddings continued to appear throughout 18th-century texts. Eliza Smith's The Compleat Housewife (1727) included a recipe, as did Hannah Glasse, Elizabeth Raffald, and Susannah Carter. In one, produced by John Nott in The Cooks and Confectioners Dictionary (1723), "Puddings of several Colours" are prepared by pouring quaking pudding batter into six wooden dishes. Into each dish, a different ingredient like cowslip or spinach are added, then the dishes are covered with cloth and boiled. (Note: Mason gives the 1726 edition of The Cooks and Confectioners Dictionary; it was present in the first edition from 1723.) Puddings made by boiling a batter became rare in Britain during the 19th century, though a baked version, the Yorkshire pudding, has persisted. In the 21st century, the chef Heston Blumenthal reintroduced the quaking pudding to the English public at his Berkshire gastropub The Hind's Head.

== In the United States ==
Quaking puddings were not restricted to Britain. Among the recipes that exist for the dish in the United States, some appear in the collection of recipes owned by Martha Washington under the titles "To Make an Almond Pudding to Boyle" and "To Make a Quakeing Pudding". In reproducing the dishes, the food historian Karen Hess found several of the steps tedious and fussy and advised cooks to employ equipment like mixers and blenders. Washington's boiled almond pudding was flavoured with ambergris—a rare ingredient in the cookery of the era. The dish itself is described by Hess as "excellent", with its combination of almonds and rosewater a "hauntingly successful one". Ambergris appears in some other English quaking pudding preparations, including The English and French Cook (1674), which closes its recipe with an instruction to "perfume a little Rosewater with Musk or Ambergriese", and in The Closet Opened (1669), which includes "Ambared Sugar"—sugar that has been perfumed with ambergris.

Records of quaking puddings persisted in the United States until at least the mid-19th century. Among these late recipes, at least one New England preparation used whole slices of bread, producing a bread pudding. Another, published in New York in 1868, served quaking pudding with a wine sauce. In the Southern US, Maria Barringer included a recipe in Dixie Cookery, which she wrote during the Civil War. It is generally considered the first cookbook of North Carolina. It advised cooks to combine: "one pound of suet, one pound of raisins, a pint of milk, six eggs, and as much flour as will make a thick batter. Boil it for three hours."

== See also ==
- Gelatine dessert
- List of sweet puddings
- List of savoury puddings

== Sources ==
=== Primary ===
- Digby, Kenelm (1669). The Closet Opened (1st ed.). London: H. Brome.
- Nott, John (1723). The Cooks and Confectioners Dictionary (1st ed.). London: Charles Rivington.
- P, T; P, J; C, R; B, N; et al. (several other approved cooks of London and Westminster) (1674). The English and French Cook (1st ed.). London: Simon Miller.

=== Secondary ===
- Ayrton, Elisabeth (1977) [1974]. The Cookery of England. Harmondsworth, Middlesex: Penguin Books. ISBN 0-14-046188-4.
- Blumenthal, Heston (2009) [2008]. The Fat Duck Cookbook. London & New York: Bloomsbury. ISBN 978-1-60819-020-1.
- Colquhoun, Kate (2007). Taste: The Story of Britain Through Its Cooking. New York City: Bloomsbury. ISBN 978-1-59691-410-0.
- Davidson, Alan (2014) [1999]. "Quaking pudding". In Davidson, Alan; Jaine, Tom (eds.). The Oxford Companion to Food (3rd ed.). New York: Oxford University Press. ISBN 978-1-78785-552-6.
- Grigson, Jane (1983). The Observer Guide to European Cookery. London: M. Joseph. ISBN 0-7181-2233-X.
- Henisch, Bridget (September 2017). "Landscape: Features and Fancies". Petits Propos Culinaires. 109: 22–31. doi:10.1558/ppc.28005.
- Hess, Karen (1981). Martha Washington's Booke of Cookery. New York, London: Columbia University Press. ISBN 0-231-04930-7.
- Mason, Laura (2007). "'A Pudding Has Two Ends': Boiled Puddings Through the Ages". In White, Eileen (ed.). The English Kitchen: Historical Essays. Totnes, Devon: Prospect Books. ISBN 978-1-903018-50-7.
- Moss, Kay (2013). Seeking the Historical Cook: Exploring Eighteenth-Century Southern Foodways. Columbia, South Carolina: University of South Carolina Press. ISBN 978-1-61117-259-1.
- Murray, James (2024) [1888]. "Amber v.". Murray’s New English Dictionary (Revised ed.). Archived from the original on 23 October 2026.
- Stavely, Keith W F; Fitzgerald, Kathleen (2011). Northern Hospitality: Cooking by the Book in New England. Amherst, Massachusetts: University of Massachusetts Press. ISBN 978-1-55849-860-0.
- Veit, Helen Zoe (2014). Food in the Civil War Era: The North. American Food in History. East Lansing: Michigan State University Press. ISBN 978-1-60917-412-5.
- Veit, Helen Zoe (2015). Food in the Civil War Era: The South. East Lansing: Michigan State University Press. ISBN 978-1-60917-451-4.
- Wilson, C Anne (1976). Food and Drink in Britain: From the Stone Age to Recent Times. Harmondsworth, Middlesex: Penguin Books. ISBN 0-14-055101-8.
- Ysewijn, Regula (2016). Pride and Pudding: The History of British Puddings, Savoury and Sweet. Sydney and London: Murdoch Books. ISBN 978-1-74336-737-7.
