= Triple-cooked chips =

Type of deep-fried potato

- Course: Appetiser, side dish
- Place of origin: England
- Created by: Heston Blumenthal
- Serving temperature: Hot
- Main ingredients: Potato

Triple-cooked chips are a type of chips developed by the English chef Heston Blumenthal. The chips are first simmered, then cooled and drained using a sous-vide technique or by freezing; deep fried at 130 °C (266 °F) and cooled again; and finally deep-fried again at 180 °C (356 °F). The result is what Blumenthal calls "chips with a glass-like crust and a soft, fluffy centre".

Blumenthal began work on the recipe in 1993, and eventually developed the three-stage cooking process. The Sunday Times described triple-cooked chips as Blumenthal's most influential innovation, which had given the chip "a whole new lease of life".

== History ==
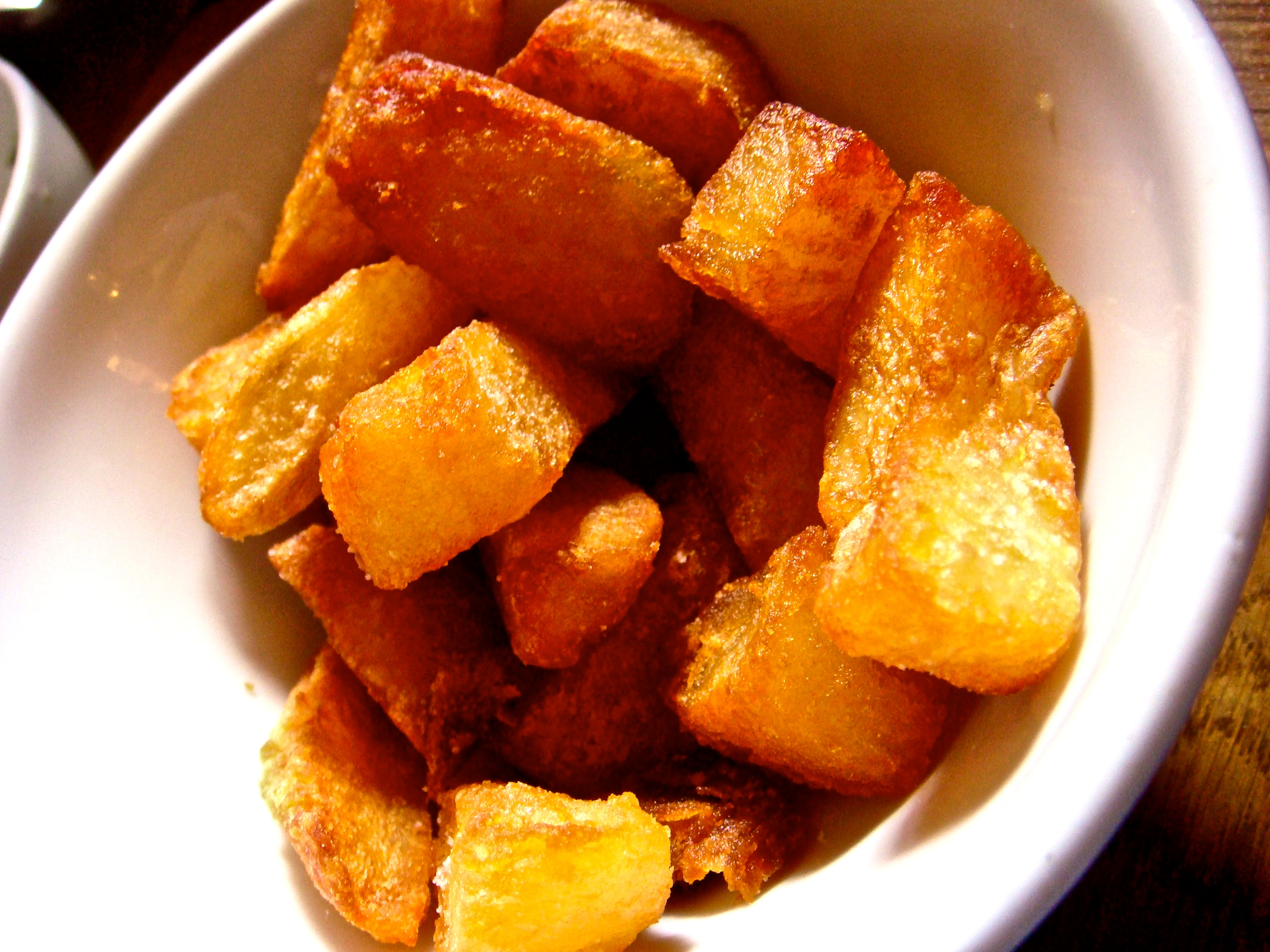
Triple-cooked chips at Blumenthal's Hinds Head pub

Blumenthal said he was "obsessed with the idea of the perfect chip", and described how, from 1992 onwards, he worked on a method for making "chips with a glass-like crust and a soft, fluffy centre". He researched the starch content of different varieties of potato and experimented with drying chips by microwaving, desiccating or even individually pinpricking them. Eventually, Blumenthal developed the three-stage cooking process known as triple-cooked chips, which he identifies as "the first recipe I could call my own".

First served at Blumenthal's restaurant the Fat Duck in 1995, triple-cooked chips have since become common in British pubs and restaurants. In 2014, the London Fire Brigade attributed an increase in chip pan fires to the increased popularity of "posh chips", including triple-cooked chips. Writing in 2014, the authors Charles Spence and Betina Piqueras-Fiszman describe triple-cooked chips as appearing on menus worldwide, so often that the two wrote that "we are certainly starting to tire" of the trend.

== Preparation ==
=== Blumenthal's technique ===
Previously, the traditional practice for cooking chips was a two-stage process, in which chipped potatoes were fried in oil first at a relatively low temperature to soften them and then at a higher temperature to crisp up the outside. Blumenthal's recipe involves simmering the potatoes first in water for 20–30 minutes until they are almost falling apart and have developed many little cracks across the surface, at which point they are drained and as much moisture as possible is expelled by placing them in either a freezer or desiccator machine. This additional stage is designed to achieve three objectives. First, cooking the potatoes gently in water helps ensure they acquire a properly soft texture. Second, the cracks that develop in the chips provide places for oil to collect and harden during frying, making them crunchy. Third, thoroughly drying out the chips drives off moisture that would otherwise keep the crust from becoming crisp. Blumenthal describes moisture as the "enemy" of crisp chips.

The second of the three stages is frying the chips at 130 °C (266 °F) for approximately 5 minutes, after which they are cooled once more in a freezer or sous-vide machine before the third and final stage: frying at 180 °C (356 °F) for approximately 7 minutes until crunchy and golden. The second stage of low-temperature frying is as essential as the first, according to Blumenthal, as it makes "any starch left in the surface cells dissolve and combine to create a rigid outer layer that can withstand the higher temperature of the final frying". This second stage is time-consuming, he acknowledges, but must not be omitted. "A single frying at a high temperature leads to a thin crust that can easily be rendered soggy by whatever moisture remains in the chip’s interior."

Other chefs, such as Joël Robuchon, had previously used such a method of cooking chips in simmering water before subjecting them to a two-stage frying.

=== Variations ===
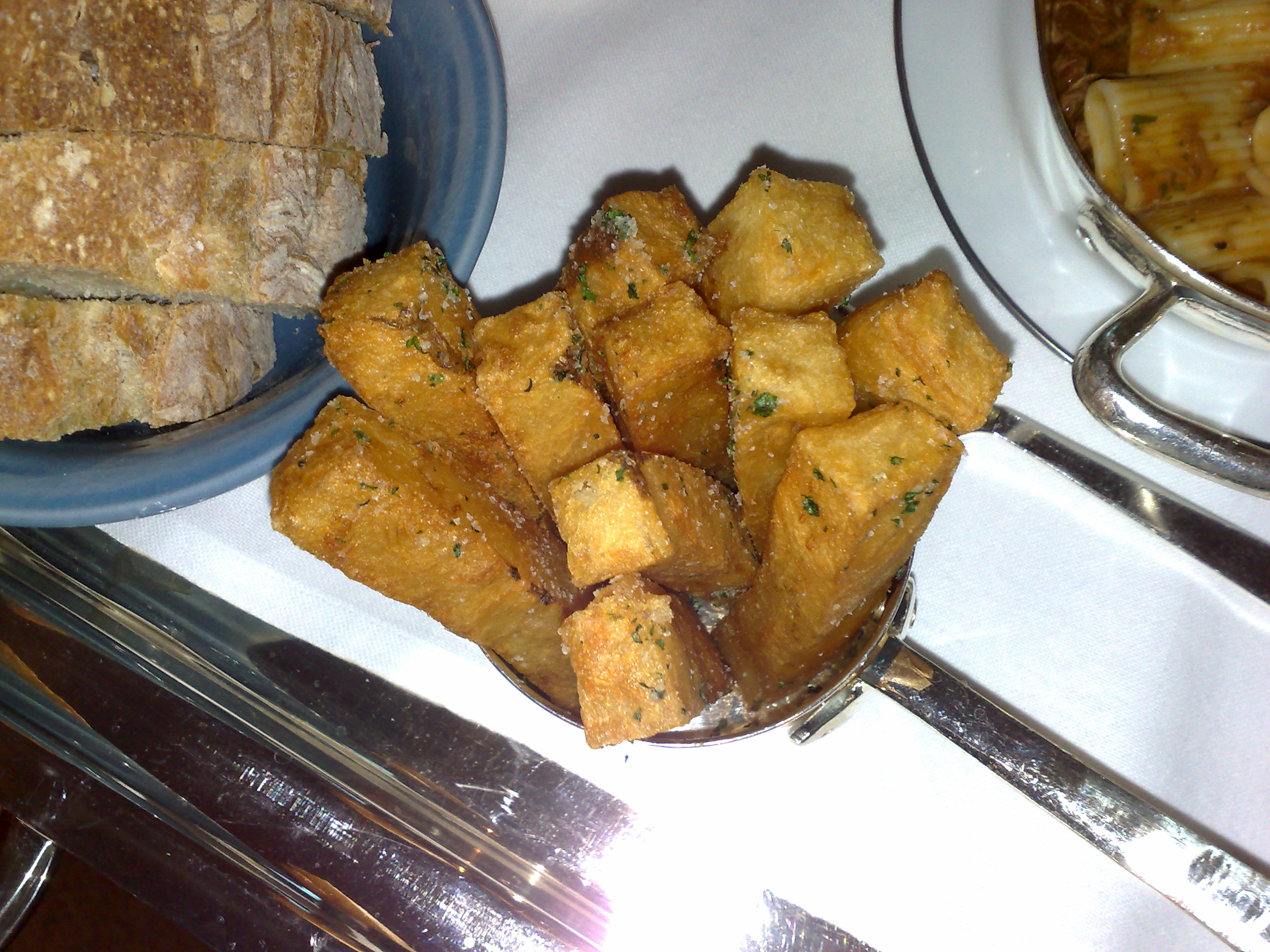
Triple cooked duck fat chips served at the Park Hyatt Washington (2008)

Variations include using a refrigerator to cool the chips in between cooking times and the use of different temperatures, such as 140 °C (284 °F) for the first cooking and 200 °C (392 °F) for the second. Triple-cooked chips cooked in duck fat is another variation. Various cultivars of potato are used, such as sebago, Rooster and Maris Piper.

== See also ==
- List of deep fried foods
- List of potato dishes
- List of twice-baked foods
- Pommes soufflées – a variety of French fried potato. Slices of potato are fried twice, once at 150 °C (300 °F) and then again after cooling, at 190 °C (375 °F).

== Bibliography ==
- Blumenthal, Heston (2006). In Search of Perfection. Bloomsbury Publishing. ISBN 0747584095
- Blumenthal, Heston (2008). The Big Fat Duck Cookbook. Bloomsbury Publishing Plc. ISBN 0747583692
- Blumenthal, Heston (2011). Heston Blumenthal at Home. Bloomsbury. ISBN 1408804409
