= Journal of Sensory Studies =

- Discipline: Food Science
- Language: English
- Edited by: Edgar Chambers IV, Harry T. Lawless

Publication details
- History: 1986–present
- Publisher: Wiley-Blackwell
- Frequency: Bimonthly
- Impact factor: 2.780 (2019)

Standard abbreviations
- ISO 4: J. Sens. Stud.

Indexing
- CODEN: JSSDEO
- ISSN: 0887-8250 (print); 1745-459X (web)
- LCCN: 90641506
- OCLC no.: 13392864

Links
- Journal homepage; Online access; Online archive

The Journal of Sensory Studies is a peer-reviewed scientific journal that covers research on "human reactions to basic tastes on foods, beverages, wine, liquor/beer, the environment, medications, and other human exposures in every day life". It is published by Wiley-Blackwell in collaboration with the Society of Sensory Professionals.
