= Dinner by Heston Blumenthal =

Restaurant in London, England

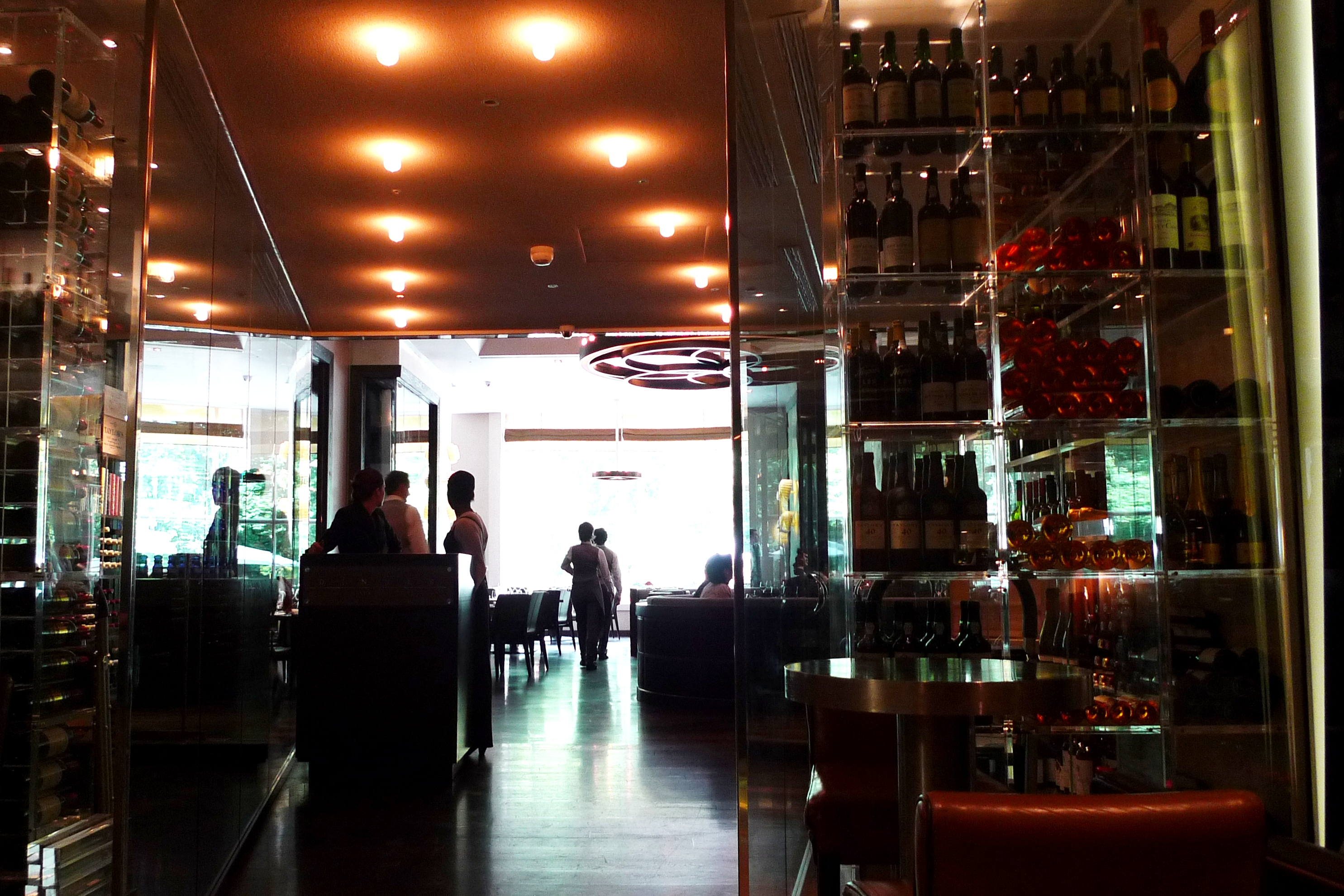
- The entrance to the restaurant space of Dinner by Heston Blumenthal
- Interactive map of Dinner by Heston Blumenthal

Restaurant information
- Established: 31 January 2011; 15 years ago
- Owner: Heston Blumenthal
- Food type: Historical British
- Dress code: Comfortable
- Rating: (Michelin Guide, 2014–present); AA Rosettes
- Location: Mandarin Oriental Hyde Park, Knightsbridge, London, SW1, United Kingdom
- Coordinates: 51°30′08″N 0°09′36″W
- Seating capacity: 110
- Reservations: Yes
- Other information: Nearest station: Knightsbridge
- Website: mandarinoriental.com

Dinner by Heston Blumenthal is a restaurant in London, England, created by Heston Blumenthal. Menu items are based on historical British dishes, which were researched by food historians and through the British Library. The restaurant's décor resembles antique British periods. Dinner's opening drew interest within the industry, and reviews have been positive. Particular dishes have received praise, including the Meat Fruit, a chicken liver mousse created to look like a mandarin orange.

Opened in January 2011, Dinner by Heston Blumenthal received one Michelin star within a year and earned its second in 2014, which it has held ever since. The British company William Reed Ltd ranked the eatery on its list of the World's 50 Best Restaurants between 2011 and 2018. Dinner was initially headed by Ashley Palmer-Watts, formerly the head chef of another Blumenthal restaurant, The Fat Duck. Jon Miles-Bowring and Adam Tooby-Desmond became his successors. The restaurant has expanded internationally with franchises in Melbourne, Australia, and Dubai, United Arab Emirates.

== Description ==
Dinner's interior was designed by Adam Tihany and displayed full-length windows allowing diners to see straight into the kitchen. It features a pulley system based on a 16th-century design used for the British Royal Court. The brand identity items, such as the logo and the menus, were designed by design agency Seymourpowell. A clockwork spitroast cooks pineapples for one of the restaurant's desserts.

Although named Dinner, the restaurant also serves lunch. The name is meant to signify the main meal of the day, regardless of when it is enjoyed. The eatery serves dishes inspired by the 14th century and beyond. Each item has been based on a historical recipe, such as the scallop dish which dates from 1826 and was published in The Cook and Housewife's Manual, written by Christian Isobel Johnstone.

The menus themselves include details such as the year from which the menu item originates. The dishes served have included scallops and peas with cucumber ketchup and bergamot-cured mackerel salad. One dish that was reported in multiple reviews was the Meat Fruit, a chicken liver mousse made to look like a textured mandarin orange. There is an ice cream trolley powered by a hand crank that mixes custard and liquid nitrogen to create ice cream at the tableside.

Dinner by Heston Blumenthal is located near Knightsbridge tube station, in the Central London district of the same name. The dining room accommodates up to 110 customers, the dress code is comfortable, and reservations are required.

== History ==
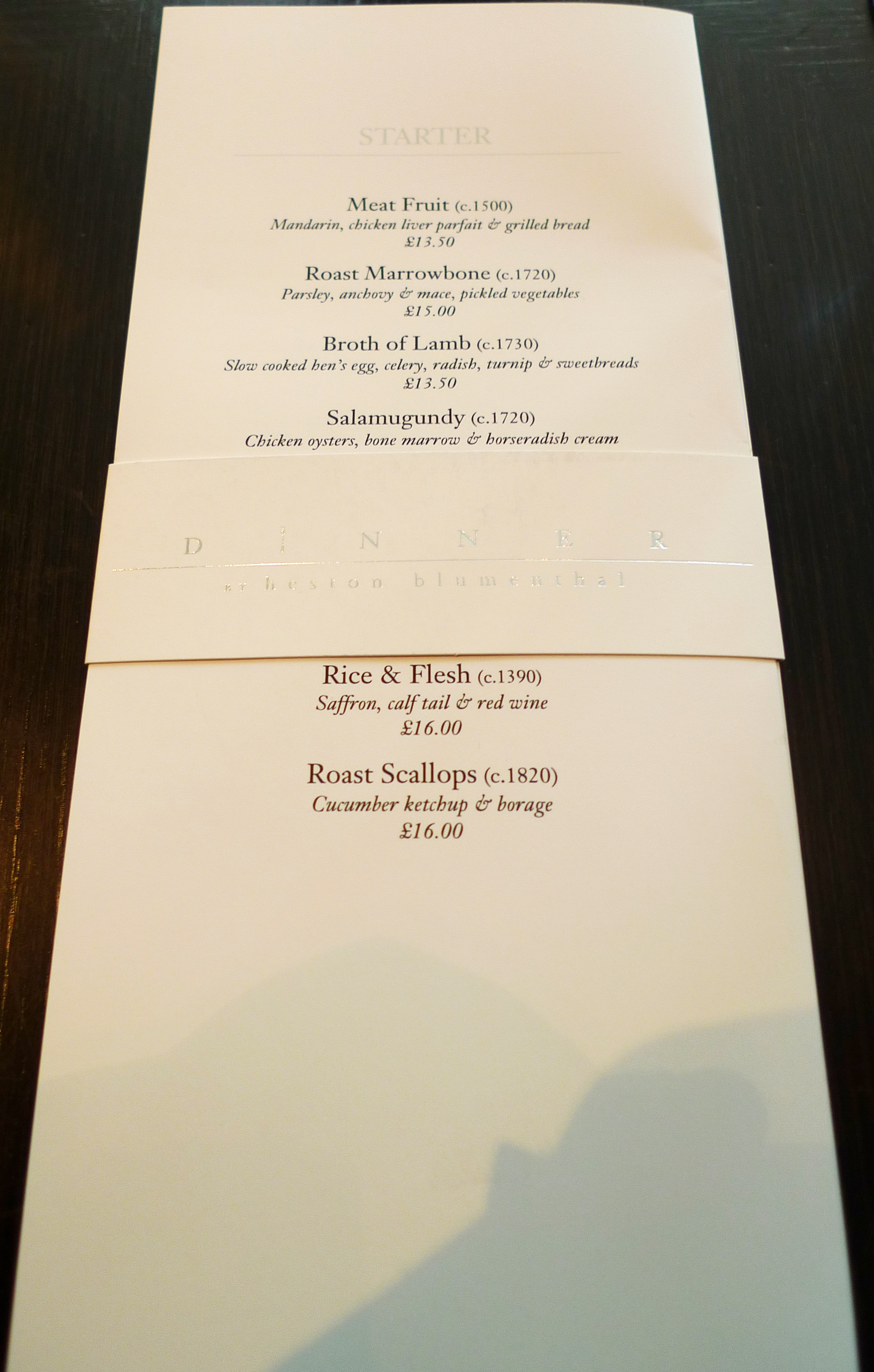
A starter menu is provided in the restaurant. The dishes include the approximate year in which it was created with a symbol of circa (c.).

Blumenthal's first experience of historical cuisine was in 2000 when he discovered a recipe for roast chicken which required the bird to be plucked alive, and then cooked with a small volume of mercury. This was further enhanced as he filmed Heston's Feasts for Channel 4 in 2009, in which he created a variety of feasts from different historical eras including Tudor, Medieval and Victorian.

The opening of Dinner was announced in August 2010, to open in early 2011 to replace the Michelin-starred restaurant Foliage at the Mandarin Oriental Hyde Park. The opening was originally planned for 1 December, but delays occurred, which would have resulted in the restaurant being ready to open during Christmas week. The decision was made to push back the opening until after the Christmas period was over. Reservations began to be accepted on 1 December 2010 for the restaurant's opening on 31 January 2011. Before opening, the first three months were solidly booked. Additionally, there were rumours regarding the dishes to be served at Dinner, including a report from The Guardian suggesting that an ice-cream meat pie could be on the menu.

The first head chef was Ashley Palmer-Watts. He had worked with Blumenthal since 1999, and for five years was head chef at Blumenthal's other restaurant, the three-Michelin-starred Fat Duck. The two chefs researched historical menu choices with the help of food historian Polly Russell, curator at the British Library.

In February 2014, the London restaurant was temporarily closed after several customers and employees contracted norovirus. Palmer-Watts left the restaurant in 2019 and Jon Miles-Bowring became head chef. Adam Tooby-Desmond replaced Bowring in May 2023.

The first international franchise opened on 20 October 2015 at the Crown Melbourne casino in Australia. Since 2018, there have been reports of underpayment of restaurant employees, with staff working up to 25 hours of unpaid overtime. By 2020, the total amount of unpaid wages had reached A$4.5 million. The Fair Work Ombudsman office initiated an investigation into the matter. The restaurant eventually closed on 14 February 2020, following the casino's decision not to renew its lease. Another franchise opened at the Atlantis The Royal hotel resort in Dubai, United Arab Emirates, in May 2023. In addition, Dinner by Heston Blumenthal was featured in a four-night residency of Chef Director Deiniol Pritchard at the Mandarin Oriental hotel in Hong Kong later that year.

== Reception ==
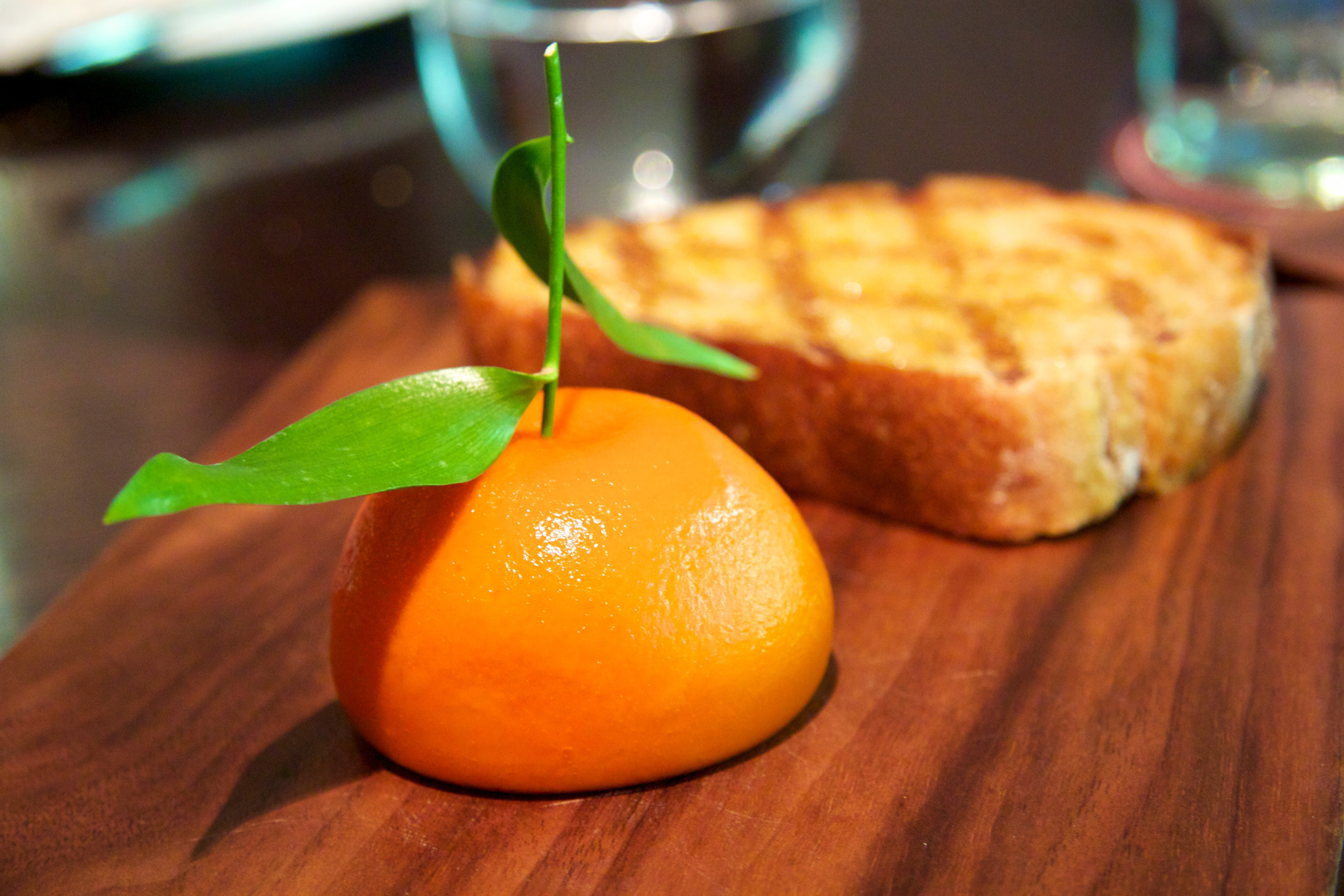
Meat Fruit, a chicken liver mousse created to look like a mandarin orange, received positive reviews.

In The Independent, the chef Mark Hix said Dinner produced the best meal he had he had eaten in "at least two years". He described the meat fruit starter as "astonishing", and said it could have been seen as gimmicky, but "when it tastes that good, it's difficult to complain". Tracey Macleod dined with Hix, and also praised the restaurant describing it as "no-fuss" and "direct". She also wrote that Hix remarked that the restaurant "could change the face of poncey dining".

Zoe Williams for The Daily Telegraph gave the restaurant a rating of nine out of ten, saying that the meat fruit made her want to "stand up and cheer", but again said that although everything served was of the highest quality, the meal did not have a surprise like courses can sometimes have at the Fat Duck. For the same newspaper, Matthew Norman described it as a "theatrical tour de force". He described the restaurant's opening as flawless and described it as the "hottest ticket in town for a very long time to come" with a rating of ten out of ten.

Chef Jason Atherton said that he could not recall a comparable buzz raised by a restaurant, and that he was relieved that the opening of his Pollen Street Social restaurant was not going to take place until late March 2011, a reasonable gap after the opening of Dinner. Richard Vines, whilst writing for Bloomberg, advised readers to not be put off the hype; he felt that while the courses are not as life-changing as those served at the Fat Duck, there are stand out dishes such as the meat fruit and the tipsy cake. He also noted that the meat fruit was a favourite of Pierre Koffmann. Jay Rayner for The Observer described the food as "seriously good", and concluded: "Dinner by Heston Blumenthal may be expensive, but it's also bloody lovely. Save up."

=== Awards ===
In the 2012 Michelin Guide, the restaurant was awarded its first Michelin star some nine months after opening—meaning "high-quality cooking, worth a stop"—, becoming one of only four restaurants in London to gain a star in that year. It has also been awarded the Restaurant of the Year title by Tatler in 2011, and won the BMW Square Meal Award for Best New Restaurant. The restaurant received a second Michelin star in the 2014 Michelin guide—signifying "excellent cooking, worth a detour"—, becoming Blumenthal's sixth star. Since then, the restaurant has maintained its two stars as of 2026.

William Reed Ltd ranked Dinner on its World's 50 Best Restaurants lists between 2011 and 2018: at number 5 (2011 and 2014), 7 (2013 and 2015), 9 (2012), 36 (2017), and 45 (2016 and 2018). The restaurant received four out of five rossettes by The AA motoring association.

== See also ==
- List of British restaurants
- List of Michelin-starred restaurants in Greater London
