= Mandarin Oriental Hyde Park, London =

Five-star hotel in Knightsbridge, London

Coordinates: 51°30′08″N 0°09′36″W

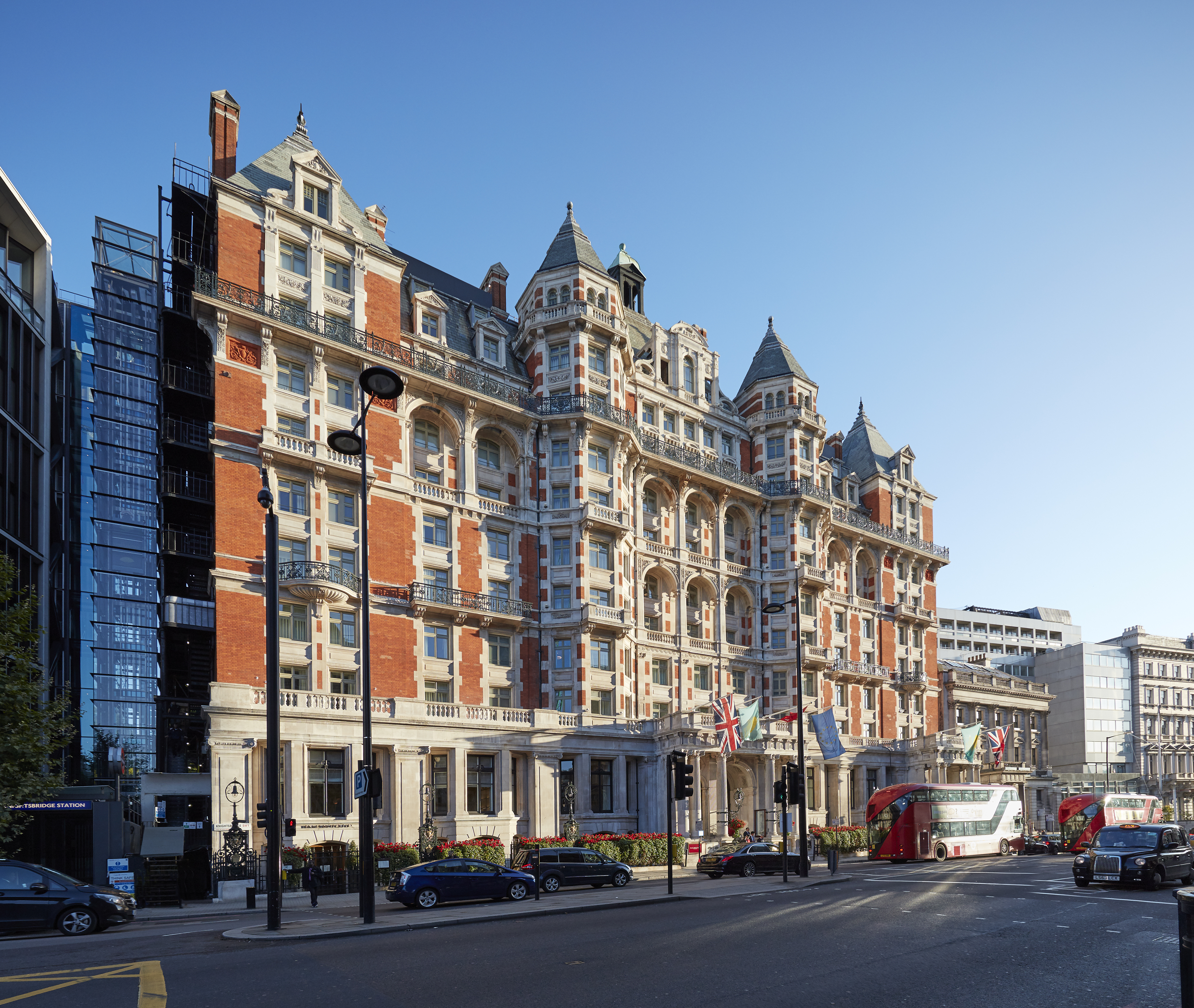

General information
- Location: 66 Knightsbridge, London, United Kingdom
- Opened: As apartments (1889); As hotel (1902)
- Owner: Mandarin Oriental Hotel Group
- Operator: Mandarin Oriental Hotel Group

Design and construction
- Architects: Thomas Archer and Arthur Green

Other information
- Number of rooms: 141
- Number of suites: 40
- Number of restaurants: 3 restaurants and 1 bar

Website
- www.mandarinoriental.com/en/london/hyde-park

The Mandarin Oriental Hyde Park, London, is a historic five-star hotel located in the Knightsbridge area of London, owned and managed by Mandarin Oriental Hotel Group. The Edwardian-style building opened in 1889 as apartments and was converted to a hotel in 1902.

== History ==
=== Early years ===
Hyde Park Court was constructed by businessman Jabez Balfour and his associate, South London builder James William Hobbs, as an exclusive apartment block. It included 138 flats and a private gentleman's club, the Hyde Park Club. Construction began in February 1888 and portions of the building opened for residents in 1889. Design work was begun by architects Thomas Archer and Arthur Green, but they broke up their partnership in 1889, and work was completed by Archer and his new partner, Francis Hooper.

Hyde Park Court was among the tallest buildings in London, and its construction proved controversial, with fears that it would cast a shadow on The Serpentine lake in Hyde Park. In 1892, Balfour's company, the Liberator Building Society, suffered a disastrous financial collapse, known as "Black September", which also brought down Hobbs & Company and resulted in the two men being imprisoned for deceiving their investors. Hyde Park Court, partly occupied but still unfinished, was taken over by receivers and completed.

In 1898, the building was sold out of receivership to Herbert Bennett, one of the directors of Harrods. A fire damaged the top three floors in 1899. Bennett closed the Hyde Park Club in December 1901 and converted the building to a hotel over the following months. César Ritz served as a consultant for the conversion, with design work done by his favored architects, Charles Mewès and partner Arthur Joseph Davis, who continued to oversee renovations at the hotel for many decades.

=== Hotel conversion ===
The Hyde Park Hotel opened in 1902, with 268 bedrooms. The building's north entrance, facing Hyde Park, was closed to the public, because King George V did not permit any advertising signage to face the park. The Knightsbridge entrance remained the main public entrance, while the northern was reserved for the royal family. Between 1911 and 1912, the ballroom was redecorated in the style of Louis XVI by Mewès and Davis. In 1925, a palm court was added.

The hotel was visited by several members of the royal family, including Queen Mary (wife of George V) and Edward VIII. Max Aitken, 1st Baron Beaverbrook, was staying at the hotel in 1916 when he was offered the peerage. Several silent film stars frequented the hotel, including Rudolph Valentino. In 1968, the hotel was bought by Trust Houses Forte. Granada Group plc bought the Forte Group in January 1996.

=== Recent history ===
In November 1996, Granada sold the hotel for £86 million to the Mandarin Oriental Hotel Group, which renamed it the Mandarin Oriental Hyde Park, London. The new owners closed the hotel in October 1999 for a £57 million renovation. The hotel re-opened on 18 May 2000.

In September 2016, another renovation began, designed by Joyce Wang.

As renovation work continued, the hotel was damaged in a fire on 6 June 2018, believed to have been caused by welding work, but no staff or guests were injured. Fire damage was mainly confined to the exterior courtyard area, with limited impact on the interiors. The hotel closed for six months as a result. In December 2018, the public areas of the hotel, including the bars and restaurants, reopened for Christmas. On 15 April 2019, the hotel fully reopened.

On 29 June 2026, the hotel hosted the launch of Dandy Crush (Skira), a book by French designer Hubert de Malherbe with a foreword by Mandarin Oriental Hotel Group Chief Executive Officer, Laurent Kleitman. Malherbe’s agency, Malherbe Paris, has worked with the group on the renovation of Mandarin Oriental, Hong Kong, including the design of the restaurant Terrace Boulud.

== Royal entrance ==
As a private gentleman's club, the entrance to the building was through the loggia on the north side. However, when it reopened as the Hyde Park Hotel in 1902, the postal address changed from Albert Gate to 66 Knightsbridge. Tradition has it that the Queen would not allow any form of advertising within the park, and therefore insisted that the main entrance, with the hotel's name above it, be moved from the park side to Knightsbridge. The Queen consequently mandated that the original entrance be preserved for royal use, unless permission is otherwise granted by the Royal Household, which has been upheld ever since. The doors were opened during the coronation of King George VI and Queen Elizabeth in 1937 when the Crown gave special permission for the guests to use the park entrance.

Today, guests of Mandarin Oriental Hyde Park, London, can still take part in this tradition of the hotel by requesting permission from the Royal Parks to use the 'Royal Entrance' for special occasions. Guests who have been granted access to this entrance include members of the Japanese Imperial family, former South African Premier General Hertzog, and a President of Uganda.

=== Noteworthy events ===
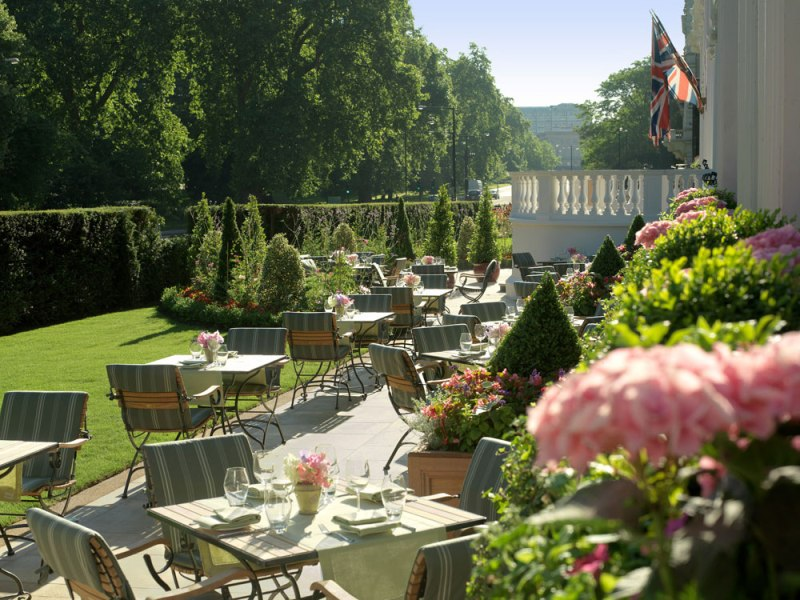
View of the Park Terrace restaurant

Many important events have been held at the Hyde Park Hotel. A few such events were Lady Doris Vyner's silver wedding party in 1948, with the King and Queen as guests of honour, and the Balaclava Ball, hosted by the five cavalry regiments who had taken part in the Balaclava charge, also attended by Elizabeth II, Prince Philip, and the Queen Mother.

Other celebrations include the 1992 production of "Pavarotti in the Park", one of the country's largest open-air concerts, the 1995 Anniversary of VE Day in which seven Heads of State and their delegations took up residence, and Party in the Park, one of Europe's largest music events. The hotel hosted the 80th birthday party of Margaret Thatcher which was attended by Elizabeth II and Prince Philip, along with former Prime Ministers John Major and Tony Blair, former deputy chairman of the Conservative Party Jeffrey Archer and entertainers Shirley Bassey and Joan Collins among others.

== Restaurants and bar ==
The interiors of the restaurants and bar were created by the designer Adam Tihany. The hotel is home to three restaurants: Dinner by Heston Blumenthal, The Aubrey, and The Rosebery Lounge, as well as the Mandarin Bar.

The Rosebery Lounge serves traditional afternoon teas, including sandwiches, scones, and sweeter fancy items; its bespoke tea list has around 30 varieties.

== See also ==
- Mandarin Oriental, Hong Kong
- Mandarin Oriental, Bangkok
- Mandarin Oriental, New York
- Mandarin Oriental, Miami
