= The Hind's Head =

Gastropub in Bray, Berkshire, England

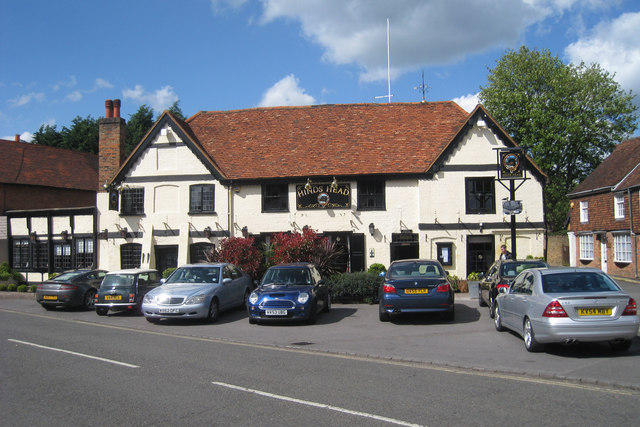
- The Hind's Head in 2009

- Location of the Hind's Head, in Bray, Berkshire

Restaurant information
- Owner: Heston Blumenthal
- Head chef: Matthew Edmonds
- Food type: British
- Dress code: None
- Rating: (Michelin Guide); AA Rosettes
- Location: High Street, Bray, Berkshire, SL6 2AB, England
- Coordinates: 51.508225°N 0.702066°W
- Reservations: Yes
- Website: www.hindsheadbray.com

The Hind's Head is a gastropub in Bray, Berkshire, England. Dating from the 15th century, the building was converted into a restaurant in the 1920s. In 2004, it was purchased by the chef Heston Blumenthal, the owner of another Bray restaurant, the Fat Duck.

Unlike the molecular gastronomy of the Fat Duck, the Hind's Head serves traditional British cuisine such as Lancashire hotpot, steak and kidney pudding, Scotch eggs and Eton mess. In 2011, the Michelin Eating Out Guide named it the best pub in the UK, and in 2013 it was awarded a Michelin star.

== History ==
The Hind's Head dates from the 15th century. It retains elements of its earlier eras, including an open fireplace. The original purpose of the building is unknown, but it is thought that it was either a hunting lodge or an abbot's guesthouse. It was an inn until 1928, when it was purchased by the London nightclub owner Kitty Henry, who combined it with the cottage next door to operate the premises as a restaurant. On 25 March 1955, it became a Grade II listed building. The Hind's Head was later taken over by a brewery.

In 1947, Philip Mountbatten (later the Duke of Edinburgh) held his stag party at the Hind's Head prior to his marriage to Princess Elizabeth. Prince Philip returned in 1963 along with a party of fifty guests, including Elizabeth, Prince Charles, the Princess Royal and King Olav V of Norway. Diana, Princess of Wales, dined with her sons Princes William and Harry, after visiting them while they were staying at Eton College.

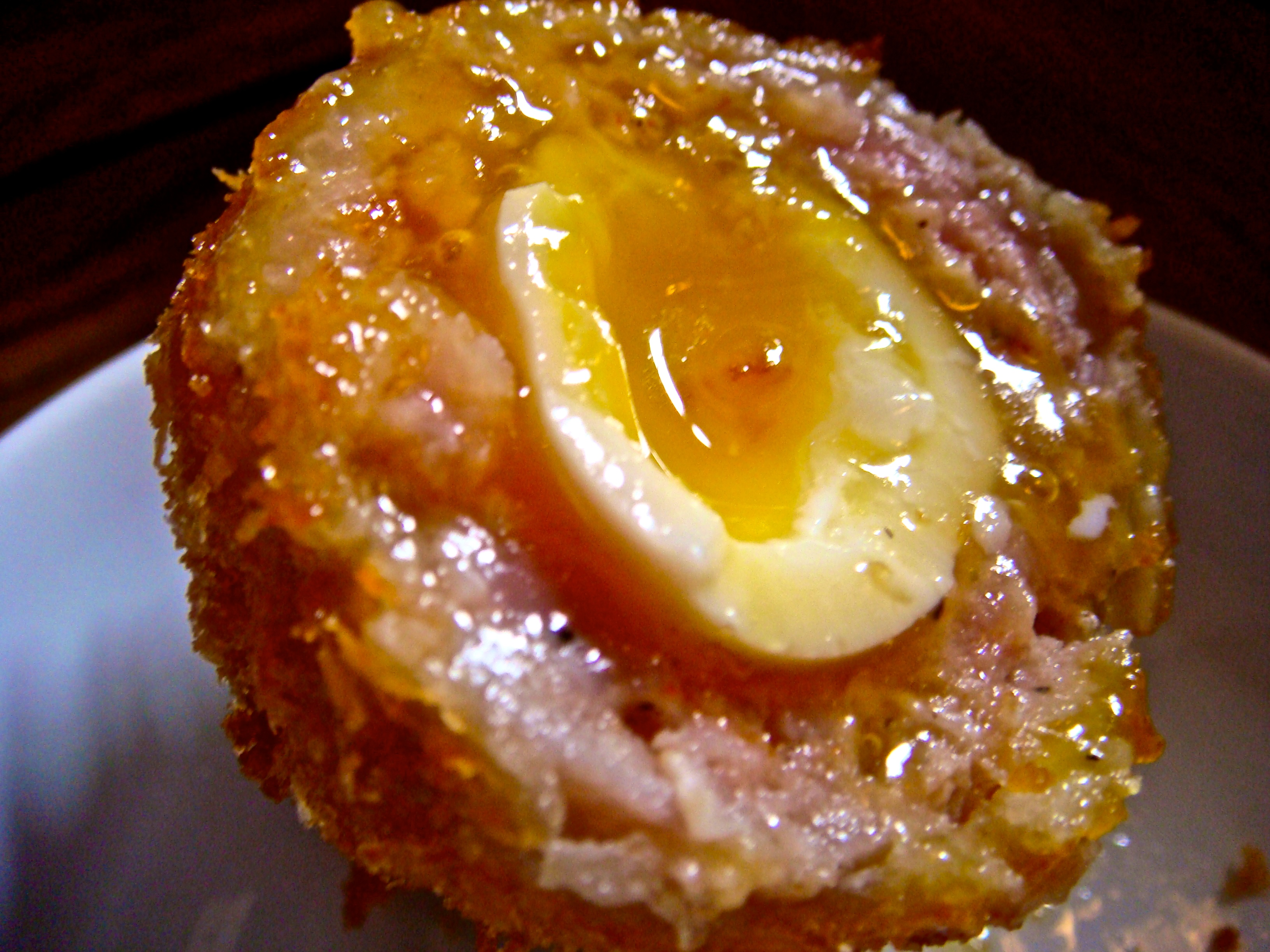
A scotch egg from the Hind's Head, made with a quail's egg.

The chef Heston Blumenthal, the owner of the nearby Fat Duck restaurant, purchased the Hind's Head in 2004. Blumenthal used funds from his investment in the Riverside Brasserie, also in Bray. He bought the premises to use the car parking and offices for the Fat Duck. As of 2007, the Hind's Head was serving up to 250 customers a day, generating £2.5 million in annual turnover. In 2008, it made £51,088 profit.

In 2008, the head chef, Dominic Chapman, left to run the Royal Oak in Maidenhead, and was awarded a Michelin star there shortly afterwards. His replacement, Clive Dixon, also left to work at Koffman's restaurant at the Berkeley in London. He was replaced by Kevin Love, who had worked at the Hind's Head for 18 months as the sous chef.

By 2010, year-on-year profit had increased to £136,196. Following the announcement of his purchase of a nearby pub, the Crown, Blumenthal said that the Hind's Head had become a destination for food rather than a local tavern, and said the Crown would act as Bray's drinking establishment.

The Hind's Head entered the 2012 Scotch Egg Challenge, as judged by Tom Parker Bowles, Gizzi Erskine and Eric Lanlard. It placed second; its scotch egg was an Iberico pork sausage-meat covered quail's egg, coated in a breadcrumb mixture seasoned with salt infused with vinegar.

== Menu ==
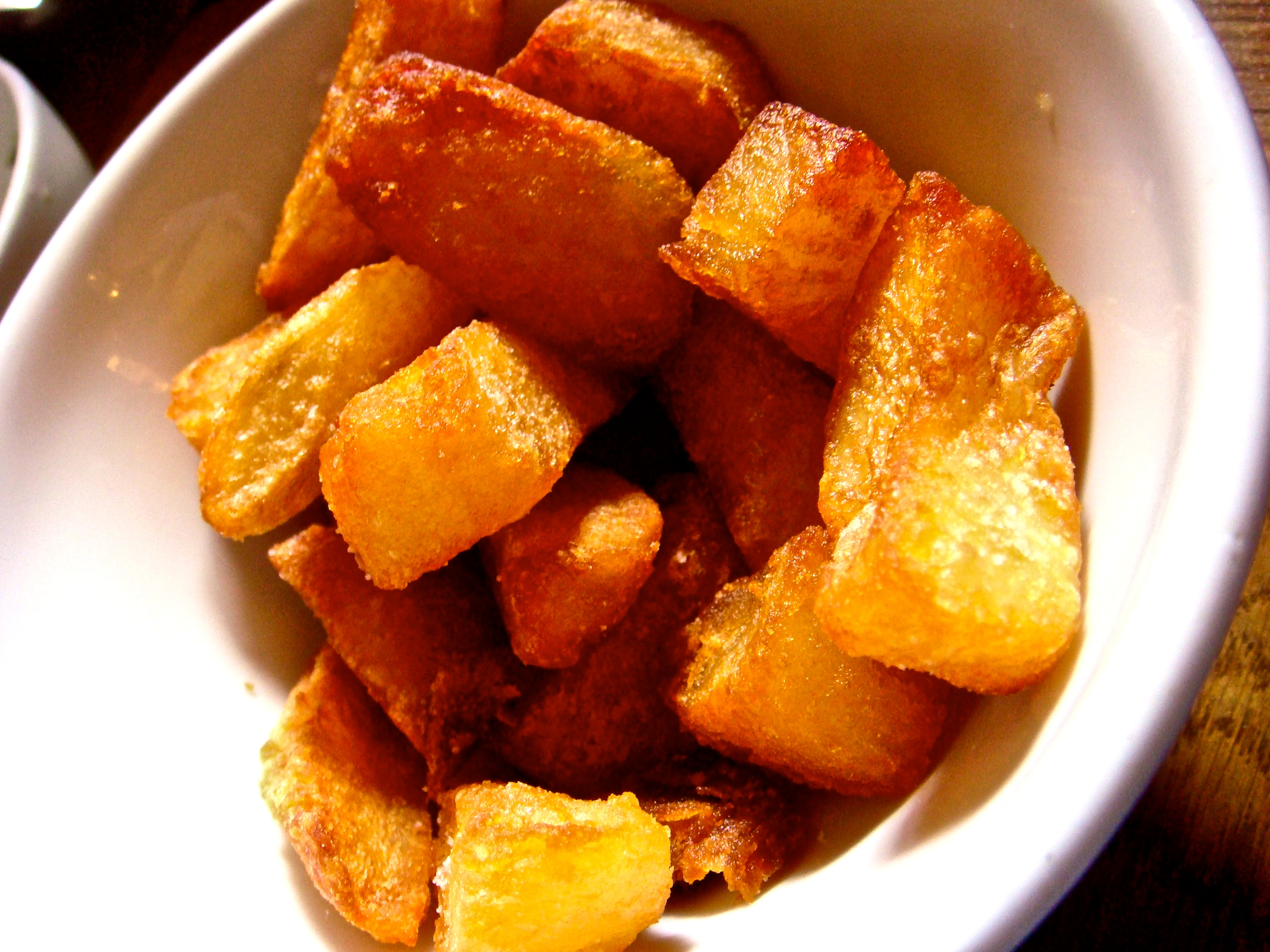
Triple cooked chips, Heston Blumenthal's first notable foray into molecular gastronomy.

Rather than the molecular gastronomy at the Fat Duck, the Hind's Head serves British cuisine. The menu features Blumenthal's interpretations of dishes such as oxtail and kidney pudding, tea-smoked salmon with sour cream butter and soda bread, and Blumenthal's triple-cooked chips. Blumenthal said that the development of the cooking methods for the chips was his first foray into a scientific approach to cooking. Former head chef Dominic Chapman worked with Blumenthal to develop a trifle for the dessert menu, which included multiple layers of syllabub, tea syrup, and a green tea infusion. The pub offers a set menu and a selection of a la carte dishes.

The Hind's Head has retained its bar and serves a range of bar snacks, including scotch eggs made with quail eggs. While Blumenthal was researching historical dishes, several were tested at the Hind's Head, including "quaking pudding" from the Tudor era and chocolate wine from the 17th century. The pub serves beer from the Greene King Brewery, with a selection of guest beers from smaller breweries.

== Reception ==
Michelle Rowe ate at the Hind's Head in 2007 for The Australian. She described the menu as "a happy collision of the sublime and the ridiculous", particularly praising the oxtail and kidney pudding. Writing for The Independent in 2010, Amol Rajan gave it a score of six out of ten, criticising the interior as cramped and lacking atmosphere. He found the lack of a suitable vegetarian option in the main courses "appalling" but was pleased with the oxtail and kidney pudding. He also thought that the presentation of a venison cheeseburger on a small wooden board was "idiotic" and that the chocolate wine slush "evolve[d] from cocoa to bad claret with each mouthful".

The Hind's Head holds three AA Rosettes. In 2007, it was named the fourth-best pub in the UK for food in the PubChef awards. The Michelin Eating Out Guide named it the best pub in the UK in 2011. It was named a Bib Gourmand restaurant in 2005, and awarded a Michelin star in the 2013 UK and Ireland edition, which was prematurely revealed due to a fault on Michelin's website. It was the fifth UK star for Blumenthal.
