= Heston's Feasts =

- Genre: Cooking show
- Starring: Heston Blumenthal
- Country of origin: United Kingdom
- Original language: English
- No. of seasons: 2
- No. of episodes: 12

Production
- Executive producer: Patricia Llewellyn
- Producer: Patrick Furlong
- Production locations: London, England
- Cinematography: Danny Rohrer, Sarah Myland
- Editor: John McNamee
- Camera setup: Multi camera
- Running time: 42–48 minutes

Original release
- Network: Channel 4
- Release: 3 March 2009 – 18 May 2010

Heston's Feasts is a television cookery programme starring chef Heston Blumenthal and produced by Optomen for Channel 4. The programme follows Blumenthal as he conceptualizes and prepares unique feasts for the entertainment of celebrity guests. The first series premiered on 7 March 2009, followed by a second series of seven episodes beginning on 6 April 2010.

== Summary ==
In each episode, Heston Blumenthal invites six celebrity guests to a four-course feast in which the dining room, food, and presentation are themed around a period of history. Blumenthal begins by researching the history, science and myth surrounding dishes of the past. He often experiments with exotic ingredients or tests unusual cooking techniques to remake historical dishes in his own style. Often, he will chase a lead and not serve the dish for various reasons such as impracticality or taste. In the dining room, Blumenthal presents each course with theatrics for the purpose of entertaining or even shocking his guests. The guests are different every episode and have included comedians, British nobility, and journalists.

== Reception ==
In 2010, Heston's Feasts won the Royal Television Society Award for best features and lifestyle series.

Writing for The Guardian, TV critic Sam Wollaston praised the episode "Heston's Chocolate Factory Feast" as "an extraordinary cornucopia of joy and wizardry and humour."

== List of episodes ==
=== Series 1 (2009) ===
No. overall	No. in series	Title	Original release date
1	1	"Heston's Victorian Feast"	3 March 2009
The basis for this episode was the Victorian era and Lewis Carroll's Alice's Adventures in Wonderland. The six guests are Journalist & Broadcaster Rageh Omaar, Actress Jemma Redgrave, TV Journalist Dawn Porter, Author & Broadcaster Toby Young, Author Kathy Lette and TV & Radio Presenter Richard Bacon.: Aperitif: Drink Me Potion; Starter: Mock Turtle Soup; Main Course: Edible Insect Garden; Pudding: Jelly & Ice Cream
2	2	"Heston's Medieval Feast"	10 March 2009
Blumenthal serves a feast themed around the Middle Ages, when chefs used gastronomic trickery to entertain the royal court. The six guests are Chef Andi Oliver, Actor Bill Paterson, Choreographer Craig Revel Horwood, Prof. Germaine Greer, Singer Liz McClarnon and Actor John Thomson.: Aperitif: Meat Fruit; Starter: Lamprey; Main Course: Blackbirds Baked in a Pie; Pudding: Illusionist Dessert
3	3	"Heston's Tudor Feast"	17 March 2009
For his Tudor period feast, Blumenthal draws inspiration from the extravagant royal banquets of Henry VIII. The six guests are DJ & Presenter Alex Zane, Entertainer Cilla Black, Journalist Kelvin MacKenzie, Singer Sophie Ellis-Bextor, Hotelier & Restaurateur Ruth Watson and Journalist Jay Rayner.: Aperitif: Butterbeer; Starter: Blancmange; Main Course: Cockentrice; Pudding: Rice Pudding
4	4	"Heston's Roman Feast"	24 March 2009
Blumenthal creates a feast inspired by the gluttonous meals of the ancient Roman Empire. The six guests are Alexander Armstrong, Danny Wallace, Greta Scacchi, the Marquess of Bath, Lisa Butcher and Matthew Fort.: Aperitif: Pig's Nipple Scratchings; Entrée: Calf's Brain Custard; Main Course: The Trojan Hog; Pudding: Ejaculating Cake
5	5	"Heston's Christmas Feast"	18 December 2009
Blumenthal serves his guests a Christmas-themed banquet.: Aperitif: Ambergris; Entrée: Dormouse Lollipop; Main Course: King's Venison; Pudding: King Wenceslas' Wonderland

=== Series 2 (2010–11) ===
No. overall	No. in series	Title	Original release date
6	1	"Heston's Chocolate Factory Feast"	6 April 2010
Blumenthal draws inspiration from the psychedelic 1960s and emulates his fictional hero, Willy Wonka of Charlie and the Chocolate Factory. The six guests are TV presenter Ben Shephard, singer Mica Paris, TV presenter Tim Lovejoy, entertainer Patti Boulaye, actress Tamsin Egerton and broadcaster Mike Read.: Amuse-bouche: Lickable Wallpaper; Starter: Magic Mushroom Soup; Main: Duck à l'Orange; Dessert: Chocolate Waterfall
7	2	"Heston's Fairy Tale Feast"	13 April 2010
The basis for this episode was children's fairytales, and also the extravagance and gluttony surrounding the Regency Era. The fairytales that inspired dishes in the episode are Cinderella, Jack and the Beanstalk, Snow White and Hansel and Gretel. The six guests are television presenter Jenni Falconer, television and radio broadcaster Caroline Feraday, writer Hardeep Singh Kohli, actor Alex Norton, actress Fay Ripley and historian Dan Snow.: Amuse-bouche: Cinderella Pumpkin; Starter: Cock's Testicles; Main: Stuffed Boar's Head; Dessert: Hansel and Gretel House
8	3	"Heston's Titanic Feast"	20 April 2010
The inspiration for this episode is the Edwardian Era, particularly explorers such as Robert Falcon Scott and Lawrence of Arabia, and the Titanic. The guests are newsreader Michael Buerk, writer Edwina Currie, dancer Adam Garcia, comedian Olivia Lee, journalist Donal MacIntyre, and actress Nadia Sawalha.: Amuse bouche: Curry Ice Cream; Starter: Scott of the Antarctic Roll; Main: Camel Burger and Humpy Meal; Dessert: Titanic Flambée
9	4	"Heston's Gothic Horror Feast"	27 April 2010
The inspiration for this episode are horror novels from the 19th century, particularly Strange Case of Dr Jekyll and Mr Hyde, Dracula and Frankenstein. The guests are TV presenter Donna Air, presenter Ulrika Jonsson, presenter Colin Murray, broadcaster Nicholas Parsons, actor Phillip Rhys and actress Laila Rouass.: Amuse bouche: Dr Jekyll's Magic Potion; Starter: Dracula's Blood Risotto; Main: Doctor Frankenstein's Monster; Dessert: Marquis de Sade
10	5	"Heston's 1970s Feast"	4 May 2010
The inspiration for this feast was to take the guests back to the 1970s era. The guests are Jo Whiley (DJ and '70s Schoolgirl), Rosie Boycott ('70s Journalist and Feminist), Jo Wood (Businesswoman and '70s It Girl), Noddy Holder (Singer in '70s supergroup Slade), Trevor Bannister (Mr Lucas in Are You Being Served?) and Mike Batt (Composer of The Wombles theme tune).: Amuse Bouche: Retro Ice Lollies; Starter: Pot Noodle; Main: School Dinner; Dessert: 1970s Pick and Mix
11	6	"Heston's 1980s Feast"	11 May 2010
The gadgets and excesses of the 1980s inspire this feast, complete with edible sushi money and "brick" mobile phone, a "power lunch" and a gourmet toastie in a giant Breville machine. The guests are impressionist Jon Culshaw, singer Jamelia, critic Caitlin Moran, actress Debra Stephenson, and comedians Mark Watson and Johnny Vegas.: Amuse Bouche: Yuppie's Delight; Starter: Gourmet Toasted Sandwich; Main: Lobster Power Lunch; Dessert: Weightless Dessert
12	7	"Heston's Ultimate Feast"	18 May 2010
In this episode, Blumenthal picks his favourite dishes from the first series, and create what he calls "the feast of all feasts".: Hors d'oeuvre: Meat Fruit; Entree: Mock Turtle Soup; Main: Cockentrice; Dessert: Ejaculating Cake
Special
N–A	Special	"Heston's Fishy Feast"	14 January 2011
Heston creates a feast of unusual and sustainable seafood. His guests are Jonathan Ross, Ronni Ancona, Morwenna Banks, Ray Mears, Denis Lawson, and Zöe Salmon.
