= Charles Spence =

Experimental psychologist

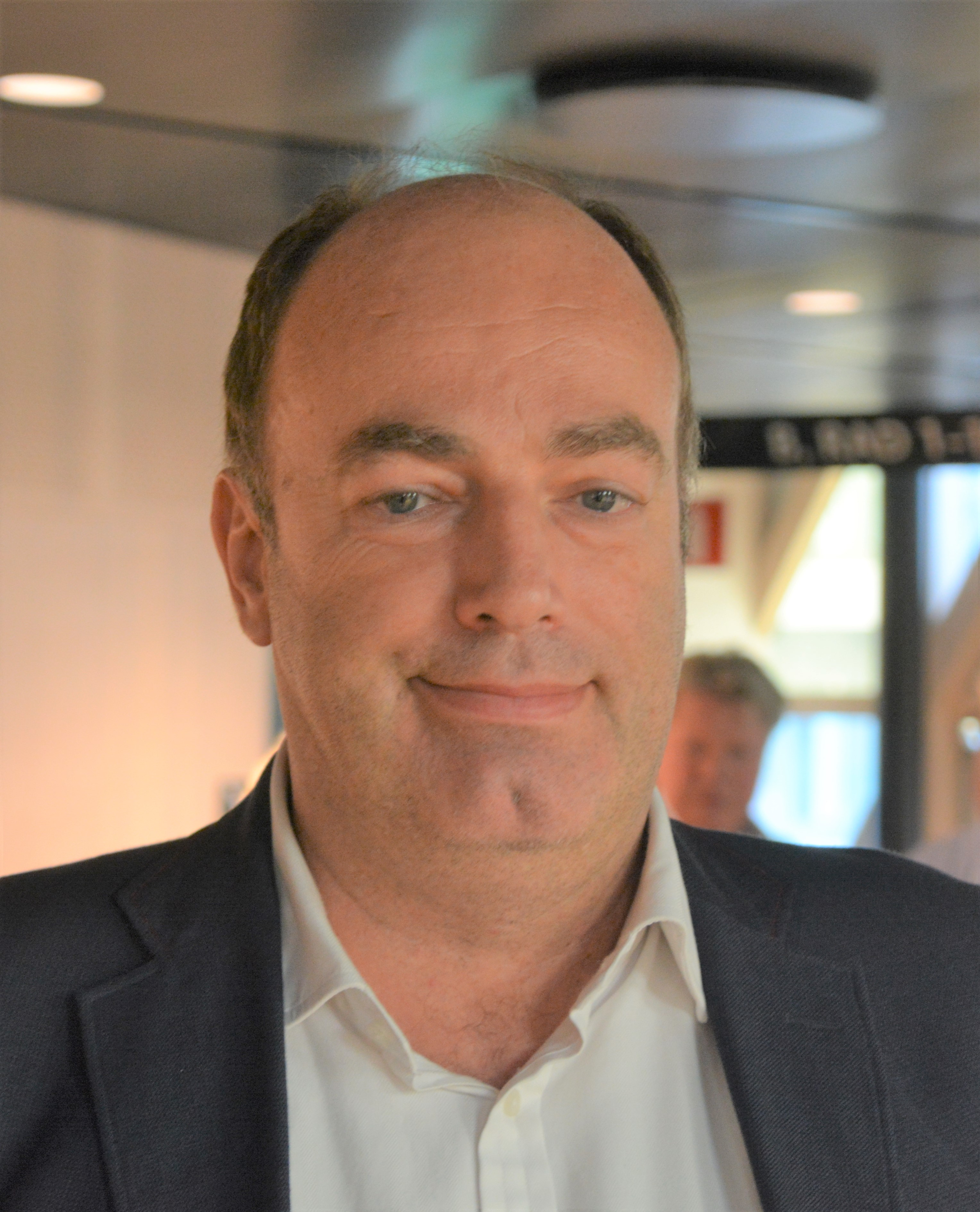
Charles Spence at a symposium in Stockholm, Sweden, in October 2019

Charles Spence is an experimental psychologist at the University of Oxford. He is the head of the Crossmodal Research group which specializes in the research about the integration of information across different sensory modalities. He also teaches Experimental Psychology to undergraduates at Somerville College, Oxford.

He is currently a consultant for a number of multinational companies advising on various aspects of multisensory design. He has also conducted research on human-computer interaction issues on the crew workstation on the European Space Shuttle, and currently works on problems associated with the design of foods that maximally stimulate the senses, and with the effect of the indoor environment on mood, well-being, and performance. Spence has published more than 500 articles in scientific journals over the last decade. He has been awarded the 10th Experimental Psychology Society Prize, the British Psychological Society: Cognitive Section Award, the Paul Bertelson Award, recognizing him as the young European Cognitive Psychologist of the Year, and, most recently, the prestigious Friedrich Wilhelm Bessel Research Award from the Alexander von Humboldt Foundation in Germany.

== Research ==
One of Spence's earliest and most notable experiments in the field of crossmodal food research was "The Role of Auditory Cues in Modulating the Perceived Crispness and Staleness of Potato Chips," published in the Journal of Sensory Studies in 2004. The experiment was the first to successfully show that food could taste different depending on changes in sound. In the experiment, Spence demonstrated that the pitch and volume of the noise made when biting into Pringles chips affected people's perception of how fresh they were. Louder, higher-pitched crunch noises were rated by eaters to be 15% fresher on average than softer, lower-pitched crunch noises. He won the Ig Nobel Prize for this research in 2008.

Since then his research has established that the sight, touch and sound of food can have large effects on its perceived taste. Other findings include that strawberry mousse is perceived as 10% sweeter when eaten from a white container over a black one, that coffee drunk from white mugs tastes almost twice as intense but only two-thirds as sweet as coffee drunk from a black mug, and that eaters perceive yogurt to be roughly 25% more filling when its plastic container weighs two and a half ounces (70 g) more.
