= Mandarin Oriental, Munich =

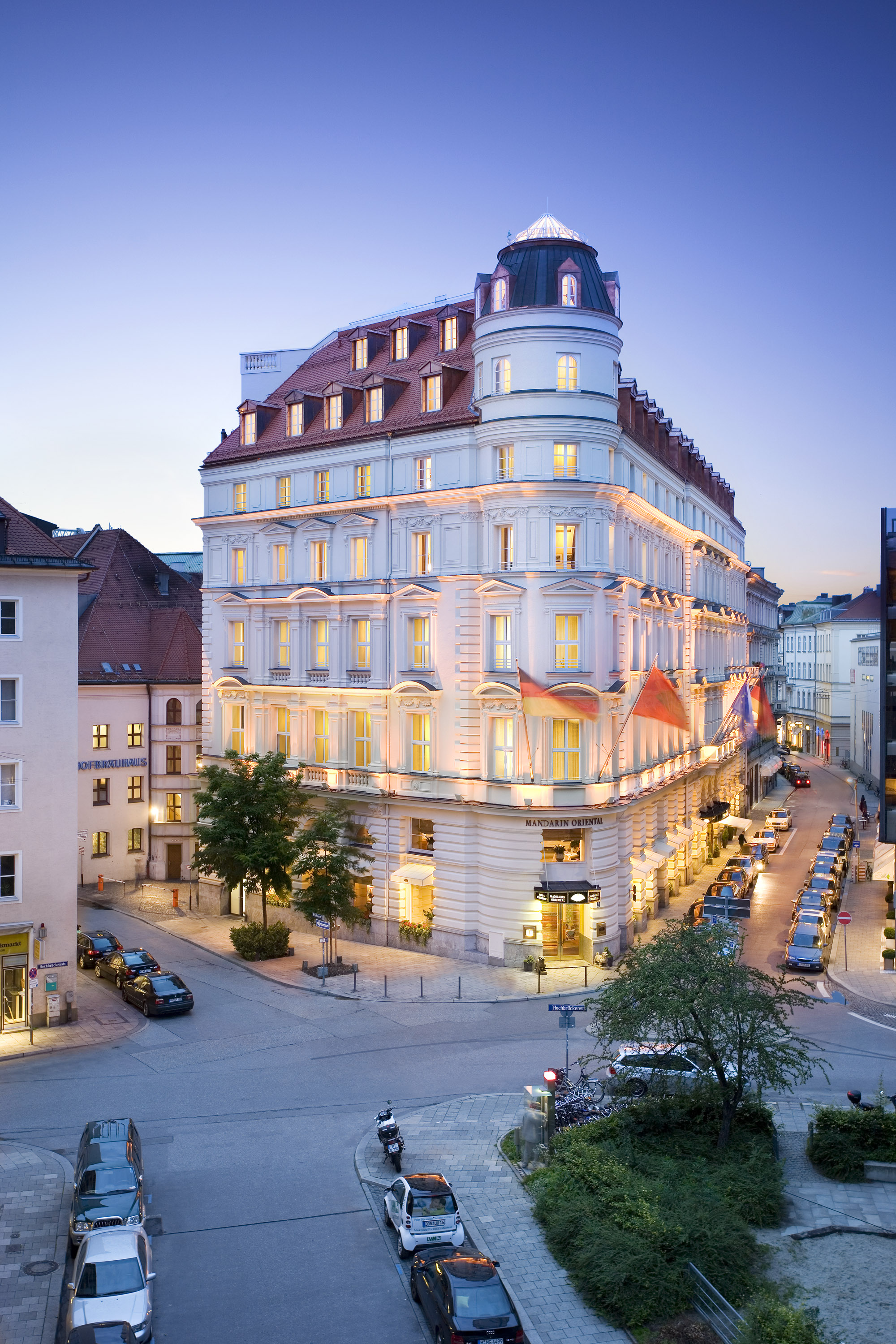
- Interactive map of the Mandarin Oriental, Munich area

General information
- Type: Luxury hotel
- Classification: _{Superior}
- Location: Neuturmstrasse 1, 80331, Munich, Germany
- Coordinates: 48.13701°N 11.58087°E
- Opened: 1990
- Owner: Mandarin Oriental Hotel Group
- Management: Mandarin Oriental Hotel Group

Other information
- Number of rooms: 48
- Number of suites: 25
- Number of restaurants: 4

Website
- mandarinoriental.com/munich

The Mandarin Oriental, Munich is a luxury hotel located in Munich's Old Town near shopping along Maximilianstrasse and the famous brewery Hofbräuhaus.

== History ==
=== Early years ===
The Neo-Renaissance building was constructed from 1875 to 1880, under the reign of King Ludwig II, by Johann Kilian Stützel and Anton Roth as the Central-Säle (Central Halls), a function facility with multiple ballrooms. Stützel bought out Roth's share in 1877. The halls hosted debutante balls and served for a time as the first home of the Kaim Orchestra, forerunner of the Munich Philharmonic.

The building remained in the hands of the Stützel family until just after World War I. The building was sold in 1919 and subdivided as office space for the sales department of a sewing thread manufacturer. The building was damaged in World War II and renovated again in 1945. It changed hands several times, until it was converted by artist financier Manfred Rubesam to the Antique Haus, an antiques shopping complex. The business was not successful and Rubesam's successor, Erich Kaufmann lost the building to foreclosure in 1987.

=== Hotel conversion ===
The building was converted to a luxury hotel by hotelier Georg Rafael, one of the founders of Regent Hotels. The Hotel Rafael Munich opened in May 1990. The Mandarin Oriental Hotel Group purchased the four properties of the Rafael Group in 2000 for $142.5 million and the hotel was renamed Mandarin Oriental, Munich. During one of the restoration projects, the building's foundations were found to encompass part of the Medieval city wall, a section of which can still be seen in the hotel's cellar. Mandarin Oriental, Munich, a 2011 selection for Conde Nast Traveler’s (USA) Gold List, underwent a renovation of its 48 guest rooms and 25 suites in 2007, followed by an extensive refurbishment of the hotel's public areas in 2015, when Japanese-Peruvian restaurant Matsuhisa Munich, Bar31, and a new lobby lounge opened.

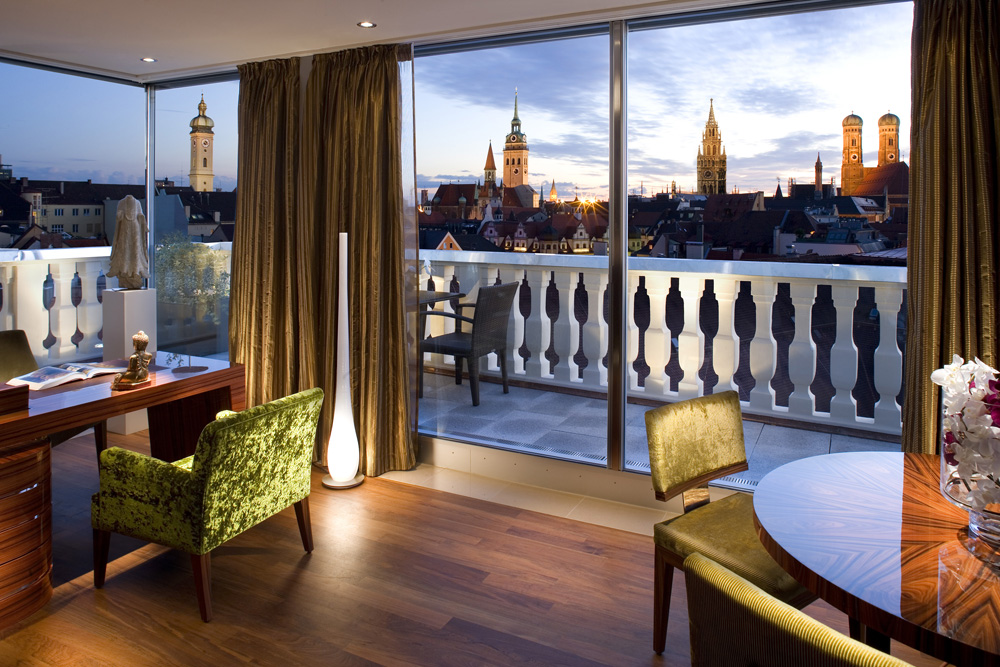
View from a suite at Mandarin Oriental, Munich

== See also ==
- Mandarin Oriental, Barcelona
- Mandarin Oriental, Paris
- Mandarin Oriental, Hong Kong
- Mandarin Oriental Hyde Park, London
- Mandarin Oriental, Miami
- Mandarin Oriental, New York
- Mandarin Oriental, Tokyo
- Mandarin Oriental, Singapore
- Mandarin Oriental, Sanya
- Mandarin Oriental, Chengdu
- List of hotels in Germany
