= Mandarin Oriental, Taipei =

Hotel in Songshan, Taipei, Taiwan

Coordinates: 25°03′20.9″N 121°32′53.8″E

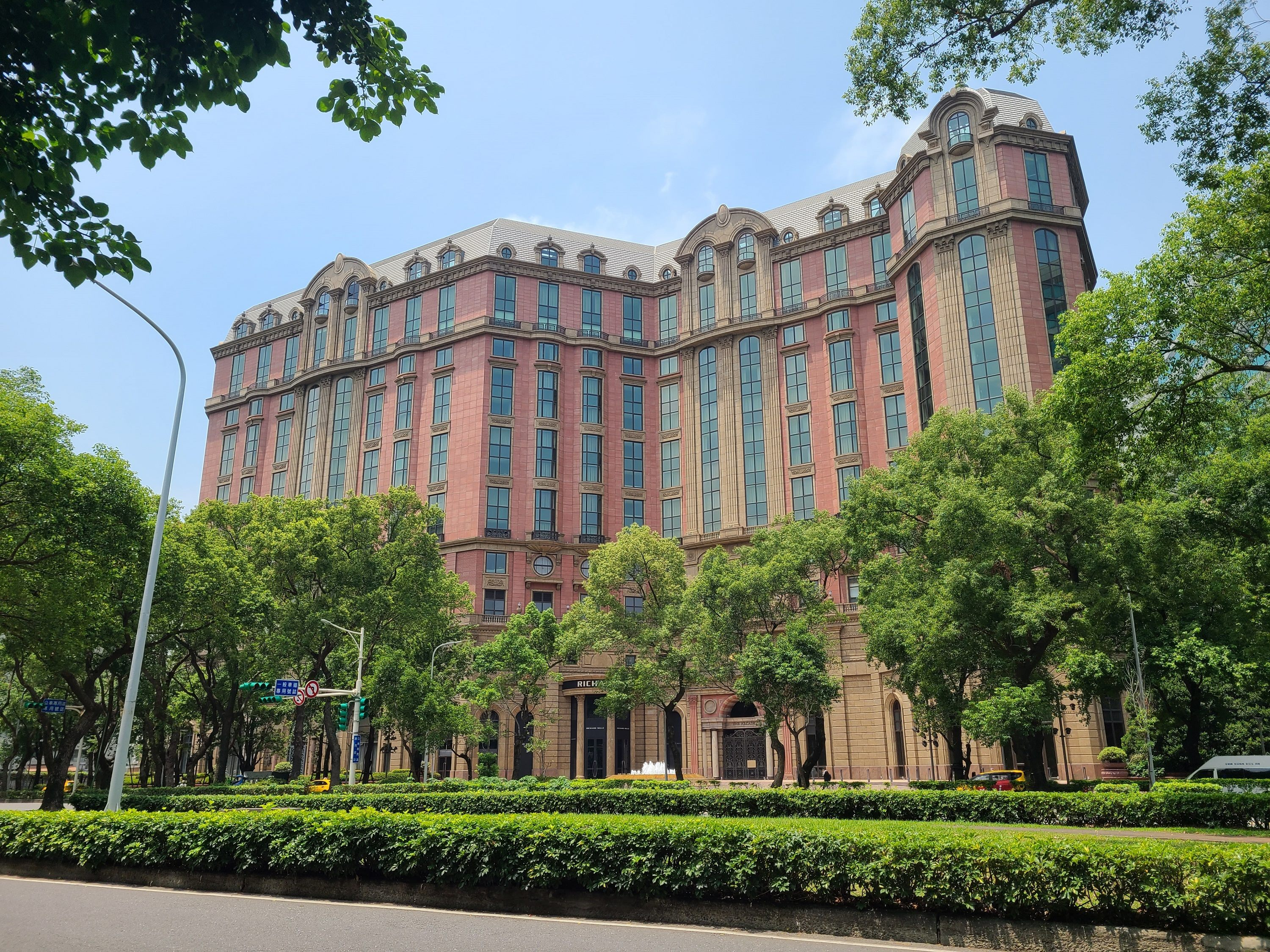
- Interactive map of the Mandarin Oriental, Taipei area

General information
- Location: 158 Dunhua North Road, Songshan District, Taipei, Taiwan 10548
- Opening: 18 May 2014
- Owner: Mandarin Oriental Hotel Group and Kai Tai Fung International Co., Ltd.
- Management: Mandarin Oriental Hotel Group

Technical details
- Floor count: 17 (B3 to 14)

Other information
- Number of rooms: 303
- Number of restaurants: 6

Website
- https://www.mandarinoriental.com/taipei/

Mandarin Oriental, Taipei (traditional Chinese: 台北文華東方酒店; simplified Chinese: 台北文华东方酒店; pinyin: Táiběi Wénhuá Dōngfāng Jiǔdiàn) is a luxury hotel located in Songshan District, Taipei, Taiwan, close to Taipei Songshan Airport, Breeze Center and Taipei Arena. The hotel, opened in May 2014, is managed by Mandarin Oriental Hotel Group. The hotel includes 303 rooms and suites, 6 restaurants and bars, and the Spa at Mandarin Oriental, Taipei.

== The Hotel ==
The architectural and interior designs of Mandarin Oriental, Taipei is greatly influenced by a blend of classic European and Asian styles, including a 50,000-piece crystal chandelier located in the hotel's lobby designed by Czech artist Tafana Dvorakova.

The hotel operates 303 guest rooms and suites. The hotel also offers a spa, an outdoor pool, as well as conference and banquet facilities. The hotel houses six restaurants, as well as a bar and a private lounge.

== Gallery ==
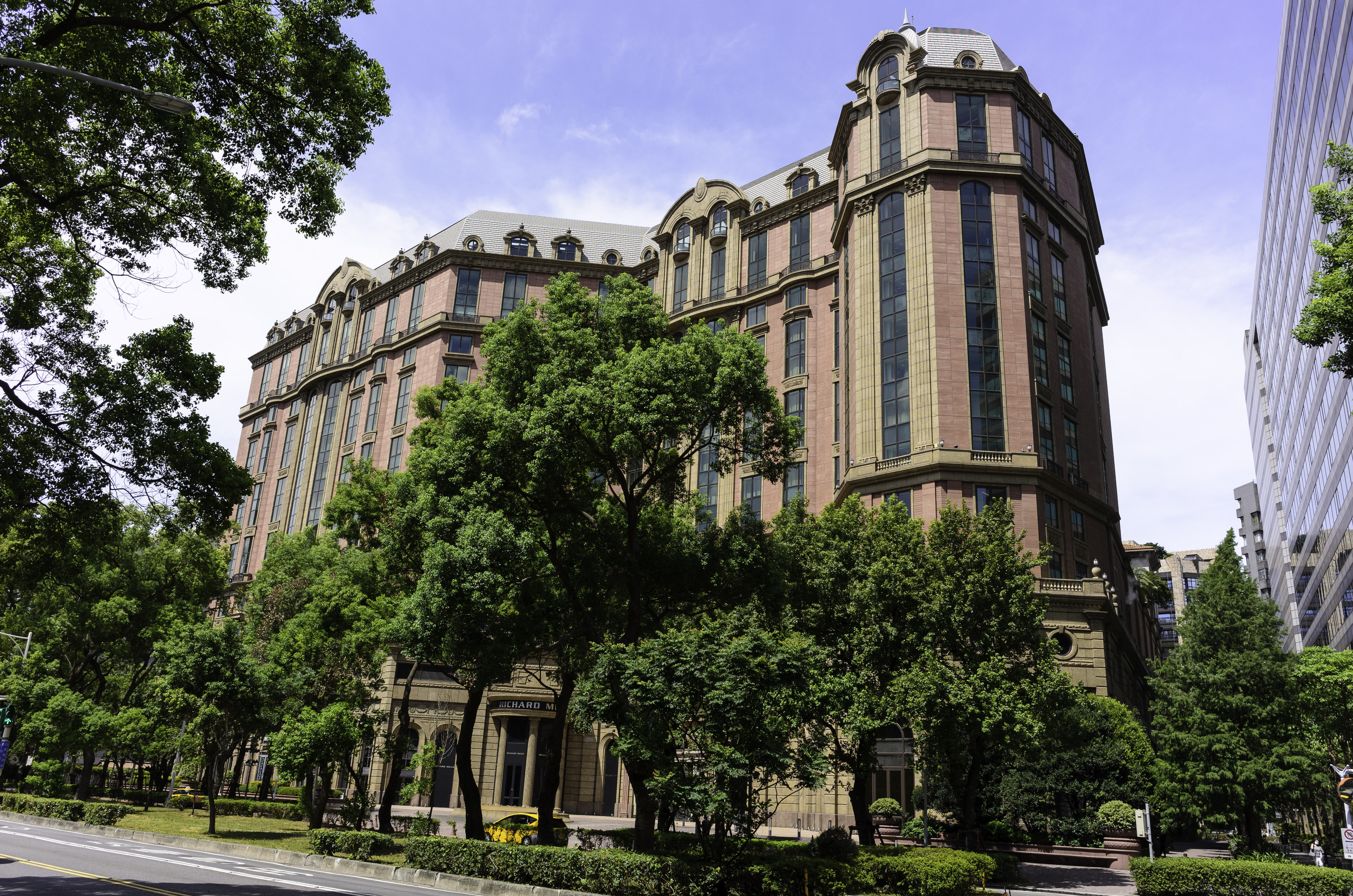
Front view in 2021

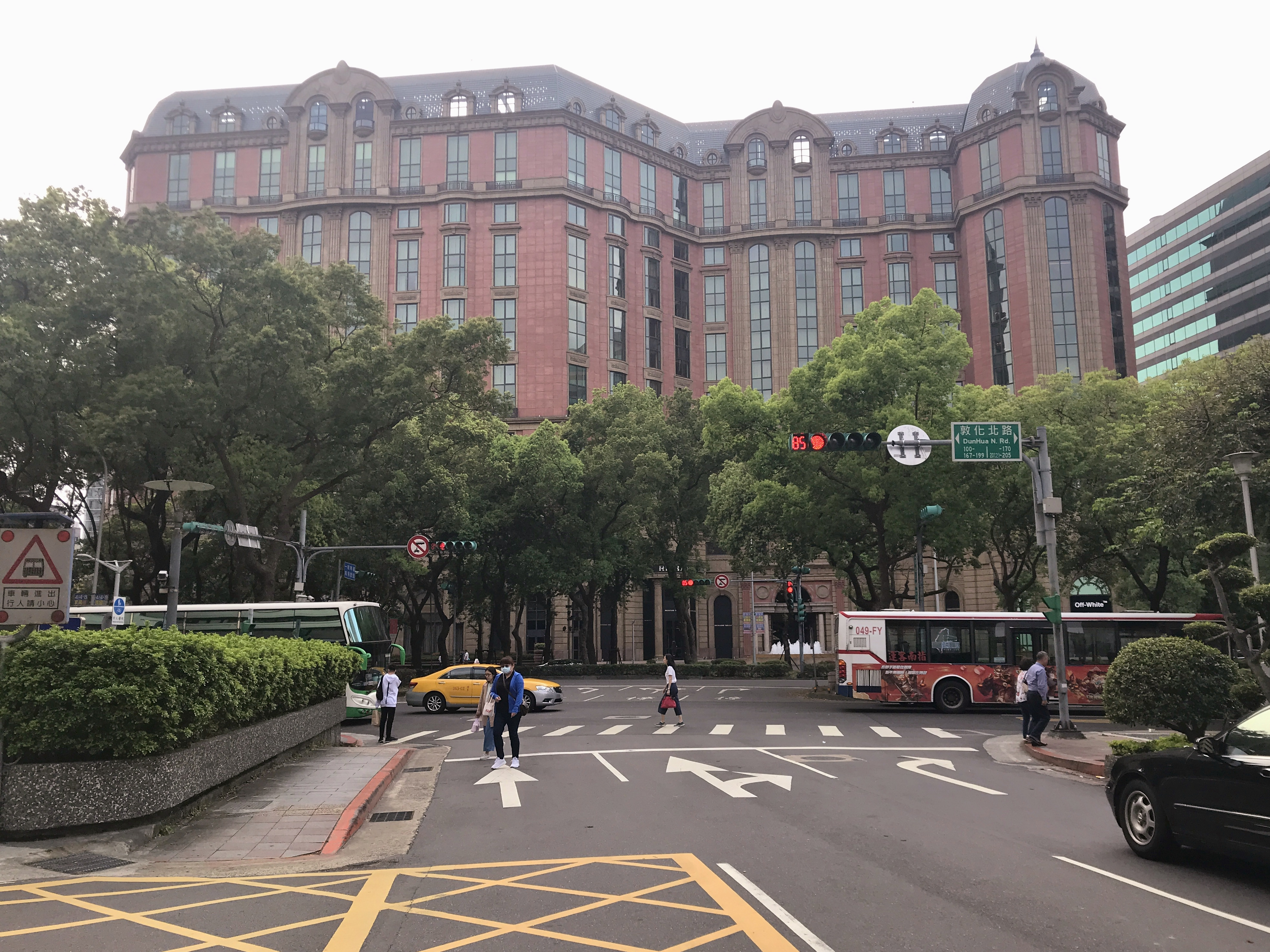
Front view

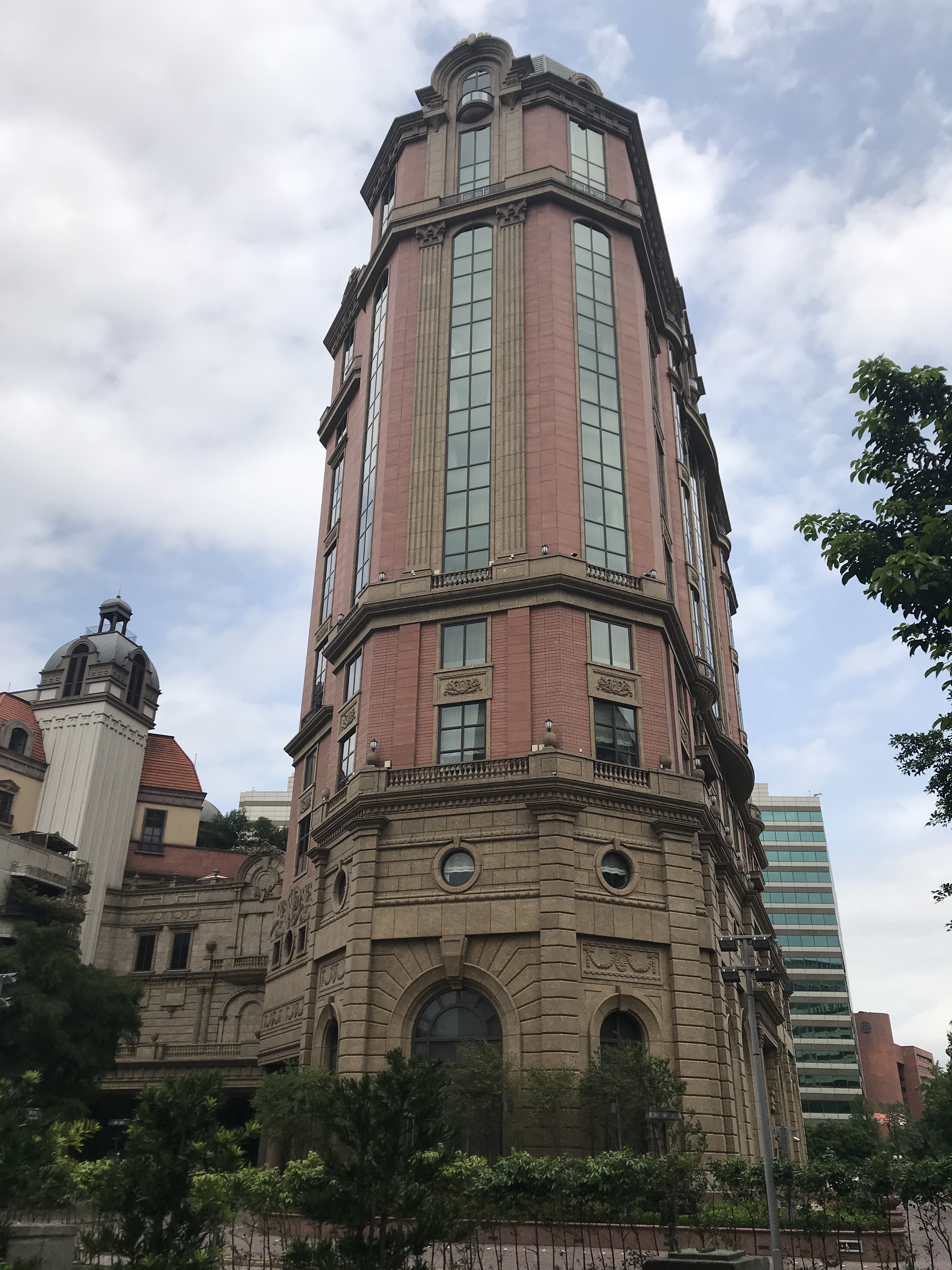
South side view of Mandarin Oriental Taipei

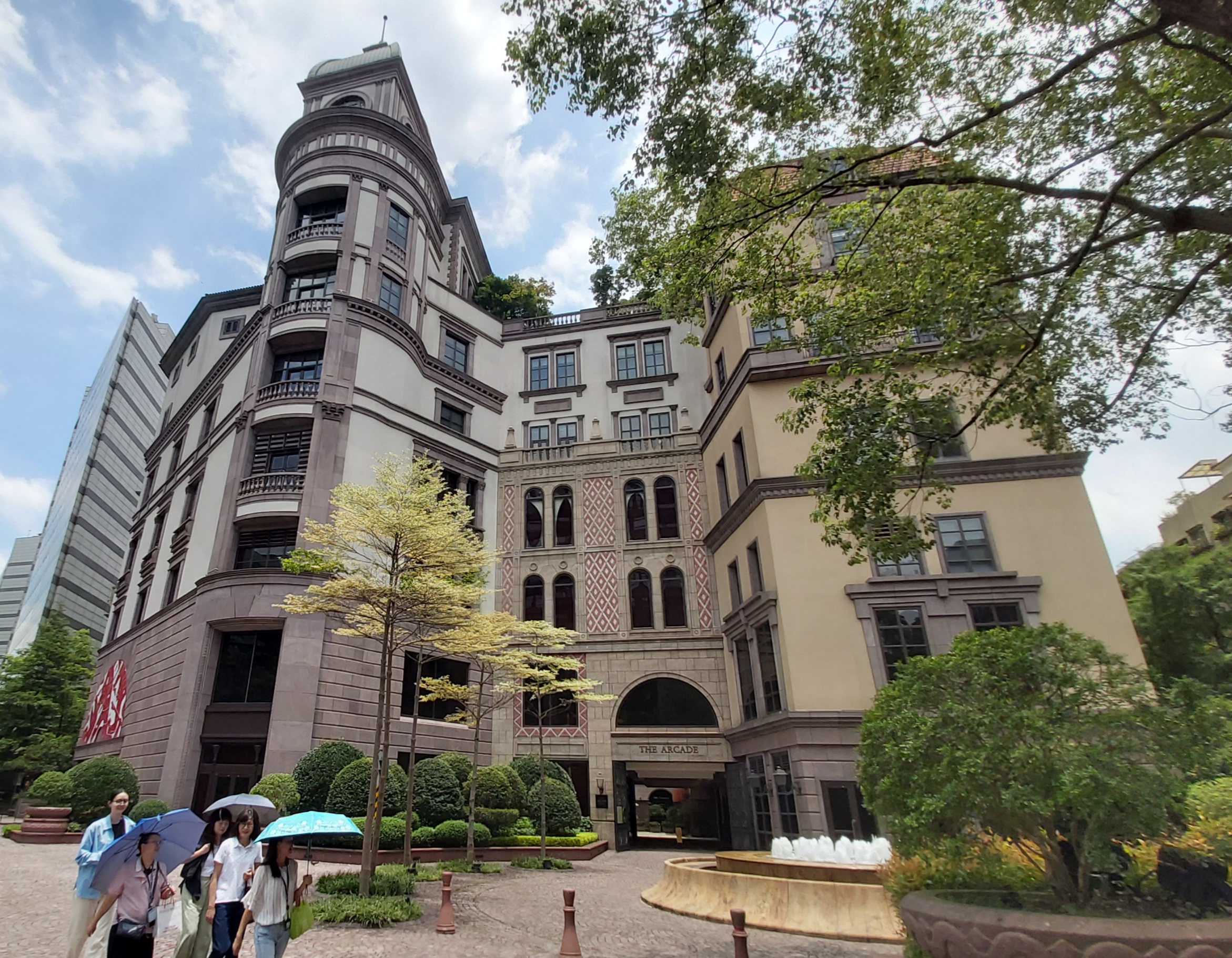
Back view

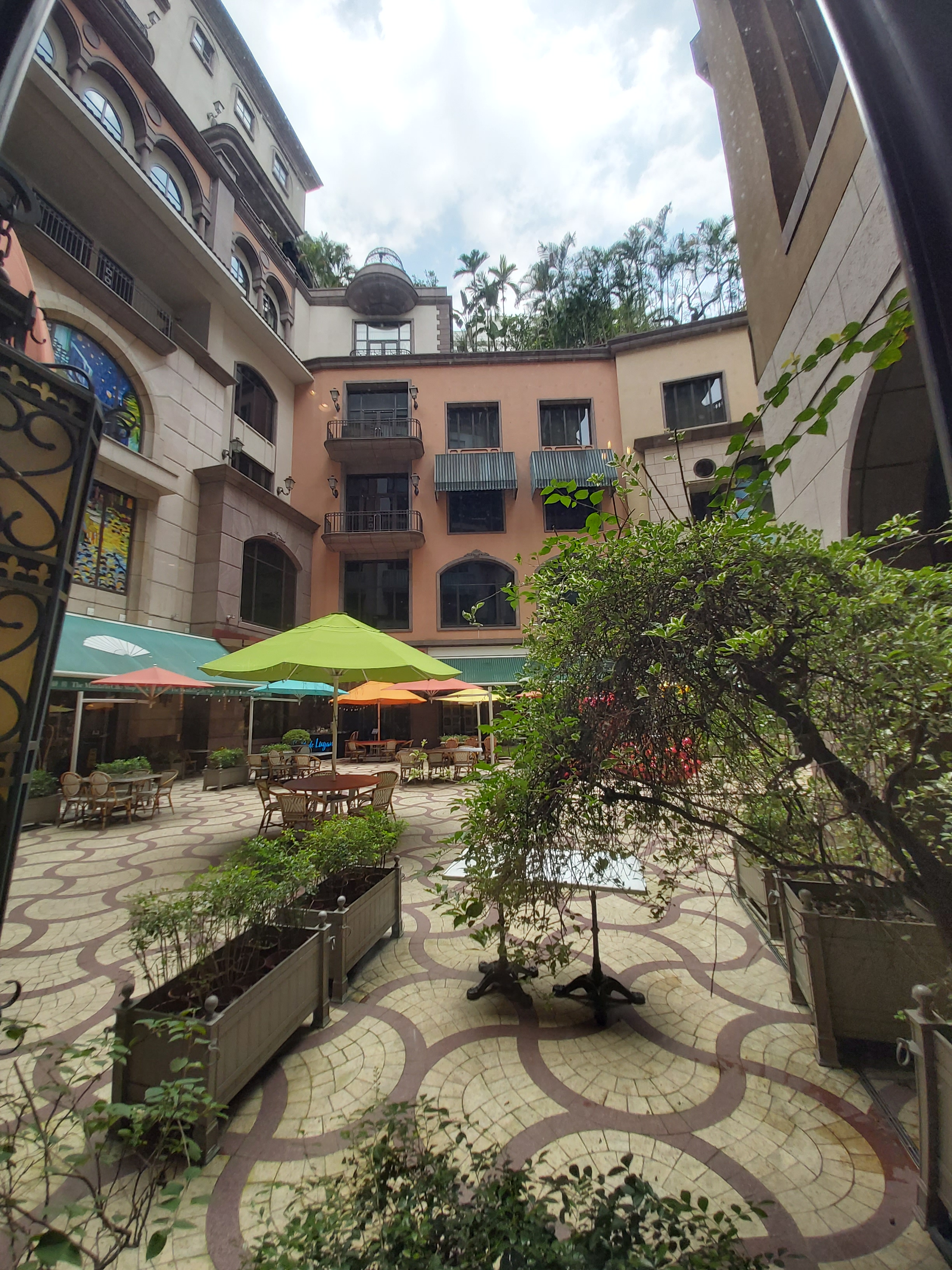
Courtyard

== See also ==
- Mandarin Oriental Hotel Group
- Mandarin Oriental, Barcelona
- Mandarin Oriental, Hong Kong
- Mandarin Oriental Hyde Park, London
- Mandarin Oriental, Miami
- Mandarin Oriental, New York
- Mandarin Oriental, Tokyo
- Mandarin Oriental, Singapore
