= Mandarin Oriental, Sanya =

Hotel in Sanya, Hainan, China

Coordinates: 18.210°N 109.533°E

- Interactive map of the Mandarin Oriental, Sanya area

General information
- Location: 12 Yuhai Road, Sanya City 572000, Hainan, PRC China
- Opening: 2009
- Management: Mandarin Oriental Hotel Group

Other information
- Number of rooms: 296
- Number of restaurants: 10

Website
- http://www.mandarinoriental.com/sanya/

The Mandarin Oriental, Sanya (simplified Chinese: 三亚文华东方酒店; traditional Chinese: 三亞文華東方酒店) is a luxury hotel and resort located in Sanya City on the southeastern coast of the island of Hainan, China. The 296-room resort opened in 2009 and is managed by Mandarin Oriental Hotel Group. The hotel contains 10 restaurants and bars as well as the 3,200 m^{2} (34,000 sq ft) spa at Mandarin Oriental, Sanya.

== Location ==
Sometimes referred to as "the Chinese Hawaii", this resort area has earned a reputation as a top tourist destination.

Sanya Phoenix International Airport is reachable from a variety of major domestic cities including Shenzhen, Guangzhou, Beijing, Shanghai, Xi'an and Kunming, as well as a number of international destinations.

== The Hotel ==
The Mandarin Oriental, Sanya is situated on Coral Bay and covers thirty acres (12 ha) of land with views of the South China Sea available from much of the property.

The resort operates 297 guest rooms including a number of duplex villas, each with dedicated butler service and infinity pools.

Three pools are located at the property, VISTA, ACTIVO, and TRANQUILLO offering lap swimming, and recreational activities.

The Mandarin Oriental, Sanya contains the Spa Village, home to The Spa at Mandarin Oriental, Sanya, and the resident Shaolin kung fu master who teaches tai chi to guests in the mornings. Yoga and qigong classes are also available.

The hotel features ten restaurants and bars, including a seafood restaurant Fresh and MO Blues a cigar and whiskey lounge.

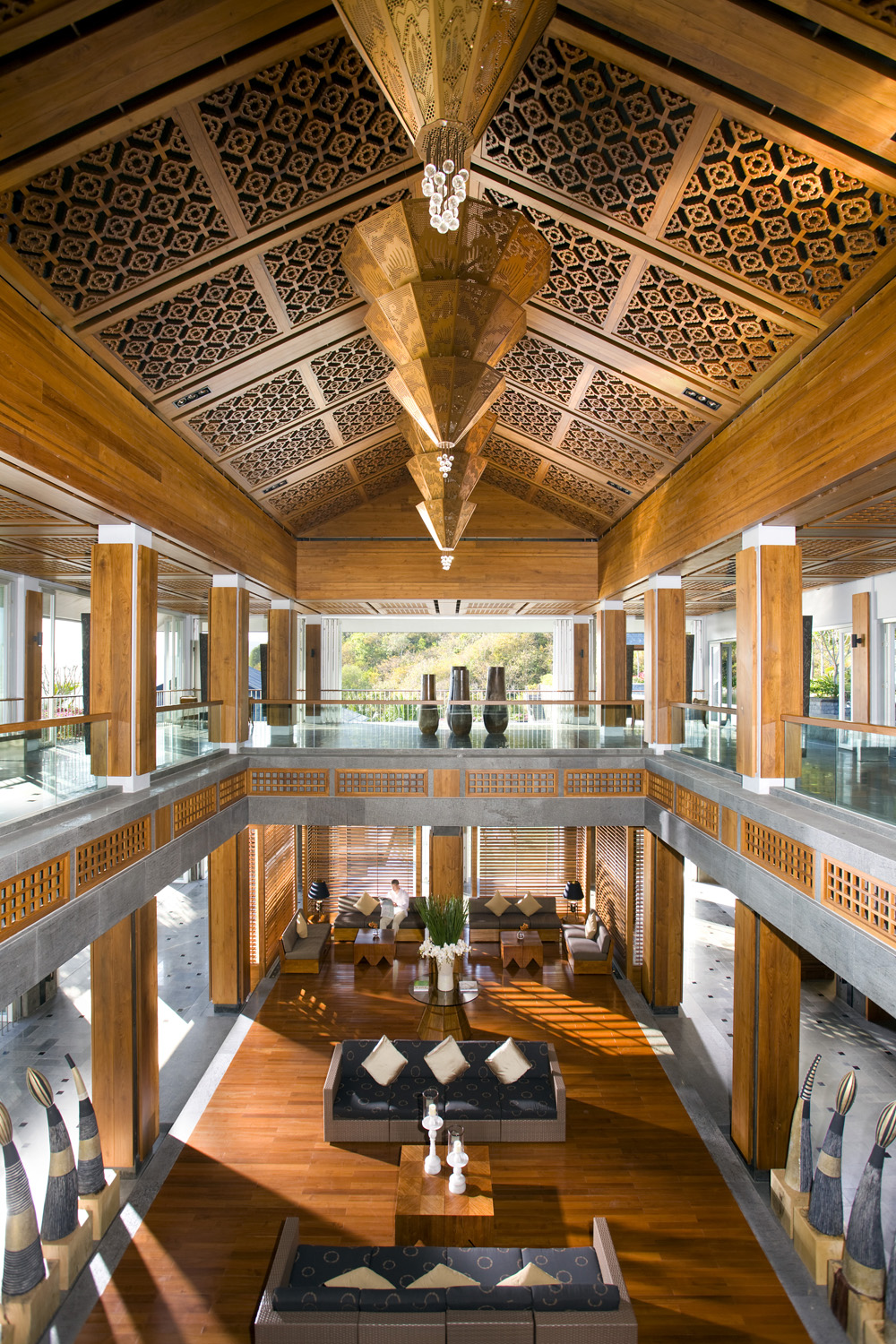
Lobby at Mandarin Oriental, Sanya

=== The Spa ===
The Spa at Mandarin Oriental, Sanya spans 3,200 m^{2} (34,000 sq ft) and features 18 treatment rooms, each with a private steam shower and outdoor bathtub. On the premises, a licensed doctor administers traditional Chinese Medicine.

=== Restaurants & bars ===
- Fresh: a Seafood restaurant with a beachfront location
- Pavilion: a poolside restaurant serving Mediterranean and Asian inspired menu items
- Yi Yang: an upscale restaurant offering Cantonese menu
- Wave: a poolside restaurant and bar
- Sunset Bar: a venue for cocktails with views of Coral Bay
- Phoenix Tea House: tea lounge serving over 100 varieties of teas
- Mee & Mian: a noodle bar located near the beach
- MO Blues: a lounge offering a menu of whiskeys, wines and cigars
- Breeze: lobby lounge at the Mandarin Oriental, Sanya that serves sweets and a variety of beverages
- The Cliff: a private dining location for villa guests

== See also ==
- Mandarin Oriental Hotel Group
- Mandarin Oriental, Barcelona
- Mandarin Oriental, Hong Kong
- Mandarin Oriental Hyde Park, London
- Mandarin Oriental, Miami
- Mandarin Oriental, New York
- Mandarin Oriental, Tokyo
- Mandarin Oriental, Singapore
