= Mandarin Oriental Hotel Group =

Hong Kong hotel investment and management group

Mandarin Oriental
- Type: Private
- ISIN: BMG578481068
- Industry: Hospitality, tourism
- Founded: 1963; 63 years ago in Hong Kong
- Founders: Atkins Dyer and William West (1863; original hotel opened in Thailand)
- Headquarters: Central, Hong Kong
- Number of locations: 42 hotels
- Key people: Benjamin Keswick (Chairman); Laurent Kleitman (Group Chief Executive Officer); John Witt (Managing Director); James Riley (Executive Director); Matthew Bishop (Chief Financial Officer)
- Revenue: ▼US$; 183 million (2020); US$; 567 million (2019)
- Operating income: ▼US$; -205 million (2020); US$; 41 million (2019)
- Net income: ▼US$; -680 million (2020); US$; -56 million (2019)
- Number of employees: 12,000
- Parent: Jardine Matheson
- Website: www.mandarinoriental.com

Mandarin Oriental Hotel Group
- Traditional Chinese: 文華東方酒店
- Simplified Chinese: 文华东方酒店
Transcriptions
Standard Mandarin
- Hanyu Pinyin: Wénhuá Dōngfāng Jiǔdiàn
Yue: Cantonese
- Jyutping: Man^{4}waa^{4} Dung^{1}fong^{1} Zau^{2}dim^{3}

Mandarin Oriental Hotel Group International Limited is a multinational hospitality and management group focusing on luxury hotels, resorts, and residences, with a total of 46 properties worldwide, 20 of which it either wholly or partially owns.

The Mandarin Oriental brand was established in 1985 following the merger of Mandarin International Hotels Limited and the holding company of the hotel The Oriental, in which Mandarin had already acquired a 49% stake in 1974. Mandarin's history dates back to the 1963 opening of its namesake hotel The Mandarin (now Mandarin Oriental, Hong Kong). The Oriental (now Mandarin Oriental, Bangkok) opened in 1876 as the Kingdom of Siam's first luxury hotel.

Mandarin Oriental Hotel Group is a subsidiary of Mandarin Oriental International Limited, which is a subsidiary of Jardine Matheson.

Current CEO is former LVMH and Unilever executive, Laurent Kleitman.

== History ==
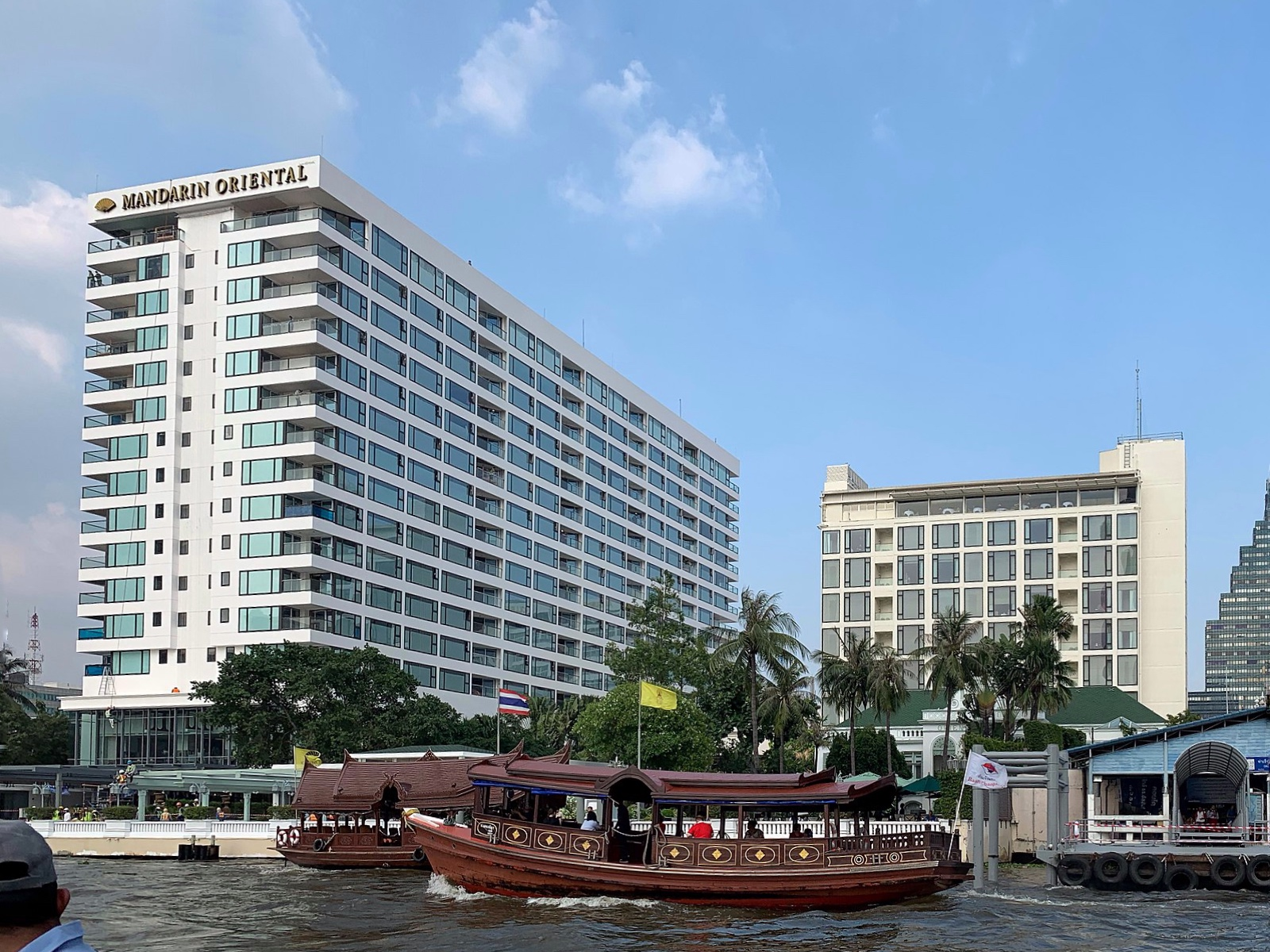
Mandarin Oriental, Bangkok

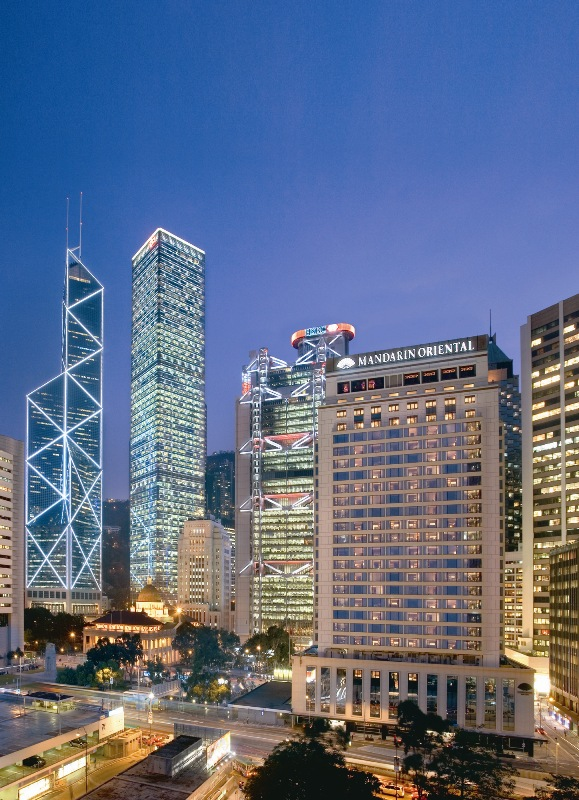
Mandarin Oriental, Hong Kong

The two hotels whose original names were combined to create the Mandarin Oriental brand

Although 1876 was the ‘official’ opening year of the Oriental Hotel, the origin of the ‘Oriental’ side of the Mandarin Oriental can be traced back as early as 1863, when two Americans, Captain Atkins Dyer, and William West, opened the Oriental Hotel in Bangkok, Siam (now Thailand): however, the original building burnt down only two years later, on 11 June 1865.

However, the history of the ‘Mandarin’ side of the group is comparatively recent: the Mandarin hotel opened only in 1963 in the Central District of Hong Kong Island. In 1973, The Excelsior Hotel, which closed in 2019, opened in Causeway Bay.

In 1974, Mandarin International Hotels Limited was formed as a hotel management company to expand into Asia. That year, the company acquired a 49% interest in the Oriental Hotel, resulting in two "flagship" hotels.

In 1985, the company combined the two hotels under a common name, Mandarin Oriental Hotel Group. In 1987, Mandarin Oriental Hotel Group was floated on the Stock Exchange of Hong Kong under the name of "Mandarin Oriental International Limited." Mandarin Oriental International Limited, is incorporated in Bermuda, and listed in London, Singapore and Bermuda. Mandarin Oriental Hotel Group Limited, which operates from Hong Kong, manages the activities of the group's hotels.

Jardine Matheson acquired full control of the business in 2026.

Mandarin Oriental, Hong Kong began a phased renovation of more than US$100 million in 2025. Hubert de Malherbe of Malherbe Paris was charged with redesigning the public spaces, Jeffrey Wilkes the guestrooms, suites and 11 new long-stay apartments, and Thierry Lemaire the signature suites. The first completed piece is Terrace Boulud, a rooftop French brasserie on Landmark Prince’s designed by Malherbe Paris, which opened in March 2026.

== Marketing ==
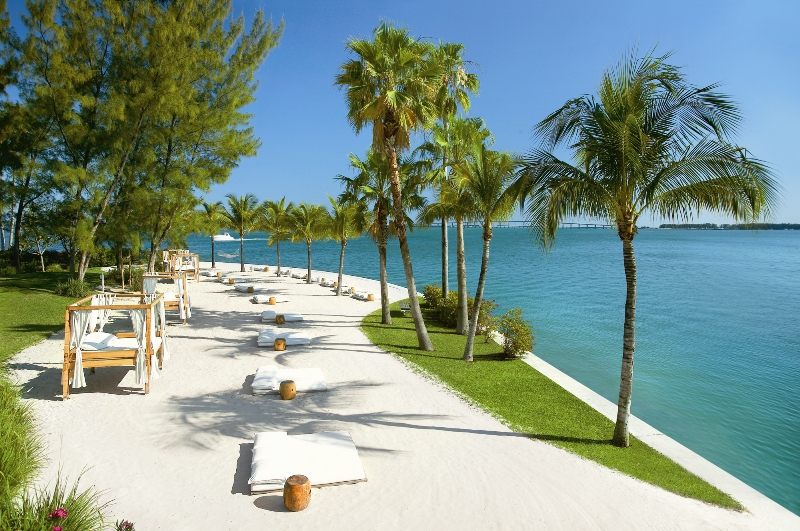
Mandarin Oriental, Miami Oasis Beach Club overlooking Biscayne Bay

Starting in September 2005, Mandarin Oriental showed the "Moments of Delight at Mandarin Oriental" at all hotels. In June 2006, the Moments of Delight video was slightly updated to add several new scenes and in October 2014, the video featured lyrics by Chinese singer, Sa Ding Ding, accompanied by new music.

In April 2025, Mandarin Oriental Hotel Group unveiled its first major visual identity update since 1985. The update kept the fan emblem, shortened the wordmark by dropping “The Hotel Group,” introduced a proprietary typeface called MO Exceptional, and added celadon green to the black, white and gold palette. Medusa Malherbe, the communications agency of the Malherbe Paris group founded by Hubert de Malherbe, won the rebranding project in September 2024. The group developed celadon green with the Pantone Color Institute. The rebranding won Gold in the visual identity redesign category at the 2025 Grand Prix Stratégies du Luxe.

== Properties ==
This is a list of all Mandarin Oriental hotel properties, as of May 2026:

=== Operating ===
==== The Americas ====
- Mandarin Oriental, Boston (Boston, the United States; since 2008)
- Mandarin Oriental, Canouan (Canouan, Saint Vincent and the Grenadines; since 2018)
- Mandarin Oriental, New York (New York City, the United States; since 2003)
- Mandarin Oriental, Santiago (Santiago, Chile; since 2019)

==== Asia and the Pacific ====
- Mandarin Oriental, Bangkok (Bangkok, Thailand; since 1974)
- Mandarin Oriental Qianmen, Beijing (Beijing, China; since 2024)
- Mandarin Oriental Wangfujing, Beijing (Beijing, China; since 2019)
- Mandarin Oriental, Desaru Coast (Desaru, Malaysia; since 2006)
- Mandarin Oriental, Guangzhou (Guangzhou, China; since 2013)
- Mandarin Oriental, Hong Kong (Hong Kong; since 1963)
- Mandarin Oriental The Landmark, Hong Kong (Hong Kong; since 2005)
- Mandarin Oriental, Jakarta (Jakarta, Indonesia; since 1978)
- Mandarin Oriental, Kuala Lumpur (Kuala Lumpur, Malaysia; since 1998)
- Mandarin Oriental, Macau (Macau; since 2010)
- Mandarin Oriental, Sanya (Sanya, China; since 2009)
- Mandarin Oriental, Shanghai (Shanghai, China; since 2013)
- Mandarin Oriental, Shenzhen (Shenzhen, China; since 2022)
- Mandarin Oriental, Singapore (Singapore; since 1987)
- Mandarin Oriental, Taipei (Taipei, Taiwan; since 2014)
- Mandarin Oriental, Tokyo (Tokyo, Japan; since 2005)

==== Europe ====
- Mandarin Oriental Conservatorium, Amsterdam (Amsterdam, the Netherlands; since 2026)
- Mandarin Oriental, Barcelona (Barcelona, Spain; since 2009)
- Mandarin Oriental, Bodrum (Bodrum, Turkey; since 2017)
- Mandarin Oriental Cristallo, Cortina (Cortina, Italy; since 2026)
- Mandarin Oriental, Geneva (Geneva, Switzerland; since 2000)
- Mandarin Oriental Bosphorus, Istanbul (Istanbul, Turkey; since 2021)
- Mandarin Oriental, Lago di Como (Lake Como, Italy; since 2019)
- Mandarin Oriental Hyde Park, London (London, the United Kingdom; since 2000)
- Mandarin Oriental Mayfair, London (London, the United Kingdom; since 2024)
- Mandarin Oriental Palace, Luzern (Lucerne, Switzerland; since 2022)
- Mandarin Oriental Ritz, Madrid (Madrid, Spain; since 2021)
- Mandarin Oriental Punta Negra, Mallorca (Mallorca, Spain; since 2026)
- Mandarin Oriental, Milan (Milan, Italy; since 2015)
- Mandarin Oriental, Munich (Munich, Germany; since 2000)
- Mandarin Oriental, Paris (Paris, France; since 2011)
- Mandarin Oriental Lutetia, Paris (Paris, France; since 2025)
- Mandarin Oriental, Prague (Prague, Czechia; since 2006)
- Mandarin Oriental, Costa Navarino (Pylos, Greece; since 2023)
- Mandarin Oriental, Vienna (Vienna, Austria; since 2025)
- Mandarin Oriental Savoy, Zurich (Zurich, Switzerland; since 2023)

==== The Middle East and Africa ====
- Emirates Palace Mandarin Oriental, Abu Dhabi (Abu Dhabi, the United Arab Emirates; since 2023)
- Mandarin Oriental, Doha (Doha, Qatar; since 2019)
- Mandarin Oriental Jumeira, Dubai (Dubai, the United Arab Emirates; since 2019)
- Mandarin Oriental Downtown, Dubai (Dubai, the United Arab Emirates; since 2025)
- Mandarin Oriental, Marrakech (Marrakech, Morocco; since 2015)
- Mandarin Oriental, Muscat (Muscat, Oman; since 2024)
- Mandarin Oriental Al Faisaliah, Riyadh (Riyadh, Saudi Arabia; since 2024)

=== Under development ===
==== The Americas ====
- Mandarin Oriental, Boca Raton (Boca Raton, the United States)
- Mandarin Oriental, Grand Cayman (Grand Cayman, the Cayman Islands)
- Mandarin Oriental, Honolulu (Honolulu, the United States)
- Mandarin Oriental Esencia, Puerto Rico (Boquerón Bay, Puerto Rico)
- Mandarin Oriental Kanai, Riviera Maya (Riviera Maya, Mexico; opening in 2028)

==== Asia and the Pacific ====
- Mandarin Oriental, Bai Nam (Phu Yen, Vietnam)
- Mandarin Oriental, Bali (Bali, Indonesia; opening in 2026)
- Mandarin Oriental Tianfu, Chengdu (Chengdu, China)
- Mandarin Oriental, Da Nang (Da Nang, Vietnam)
- Mandarin Oriental, Hangzhou (Hangzhou, China)
- Mandarin Oriental Makati, Manila (Makati, Philippines)
- Mandarin Oriental, Maldives (The Maldives)
- Mandarin Oriental, Nanjing (Nanjing, China)
- Mandarin Oriental, Phuket (Phuket, Thailand)
- Mandarin Oriental, Saigon (Ho Chi Minh City, Vietnam)
- Mandarin Oriental, Seoul (Seoul, South Korea; opening in 2030)
- Mandarin Oriental, Setouchi (Setouchi, Japan)
- Mandarin Oriental, Suzhou (Suzhou, China)
- Mandarin Oriental, Xi’an (Xi'an, China; opening in 2029)

==== Europe ====
- Mandarin Oriental, Athens (Athens, Greece)
- Mandarin Oriental Gellert, Budapest (Budapest, Hungary)
- Mandarin Oriental Bankside Yards, London (London, the United Kingdom)
- Mandarin Oriental, Porto Cervo (Sardinia, Italy)
- Mandarin Oriental, Rome (Rome, Italy)

==== The Middle East and Africa ====
- Mandarin Oriental Old Cataract, Aswan (Aswan, Egypt; opening in 2027)
- Mandarin Oriental Shepheard, Cairo (Cairo, Egypt; opening in 2027)
- Mandarin Oriental, Jeddah (Jeddah, Saudi Arabia; opening in 2030)
- Mandarin Oriental, Kuwait (Kuwait City, Kuwait)
- Mandarin Oriental Winter Palace, Luxor (Luxor, Egypt; opening in 2027)
- Mandarin Oriental, Tel Aviv (Tel Aviv, Israel)

=== Closed ===
==== The Americas ====
- Mandarin Oriental, Las Vegas (Las Vegas, the United States; from 2009 to 2018, later became the Waldorf Astoria Las Vegas)
- Mandarin Oriental, Miami (Miami, the United States; from 2000 to 2025)
- Mandarin Oriental, San Francisco (San Francisco, the United States; from 1987 to 2015, later became the Four Seasons Hotel San Francisco at Embarcadero)

==== Asia ====
- Mandarin Oriental, Macau (Macau; from post-1984 to 2009, later became the Grand Lapa Macau and not to be confused with the current Mandarin Oriental, Macau)
- Mandarin Oriental Manila (Makati, Philippines; from 1976 to 2014, not to be confused with the above-mentioned Mandarin Oriental Makati, Manila)

=== Cancelled ===
==== The Americas ====
- Mandarin Oriental, Dallas (Dallas, United States; proposed in 2006, cancelled in 2009)

== Incidents ==
=== Leslie Cheung suicide (2003) ===
On 1 April 2003, singer, actor, and film producer Leslie Cheung leaped to his death from the 24th floor of the Mandarin Oriental in Central Hong Kong. Every year, on the anniversary of his death, a fan-organised memorial event takes place outside the hotel.

=== Credit card breach (2015) ===
In March 2015, several Mandarin Oriental hotels were affected by a point-of-sale systems security breach.

=== Hyde Park fire (2018) ===
On 6 June 2018, a fire (believed to have been caused by welding work) damaged the park-facing exterior of the Mandarin Oriental Hyde Park in London. Although there were no injuries, the fire closed the hotel and caused a significant setback to the (then) near-complete renovation work, which involved interior designer Joyce Wang. The hotel returned to full operation on 15 April 2019.
