= Old Cataract Hotel =

Hotel in Aswan, Egypt

Coordinates: 24.080442°N 32.881172°E

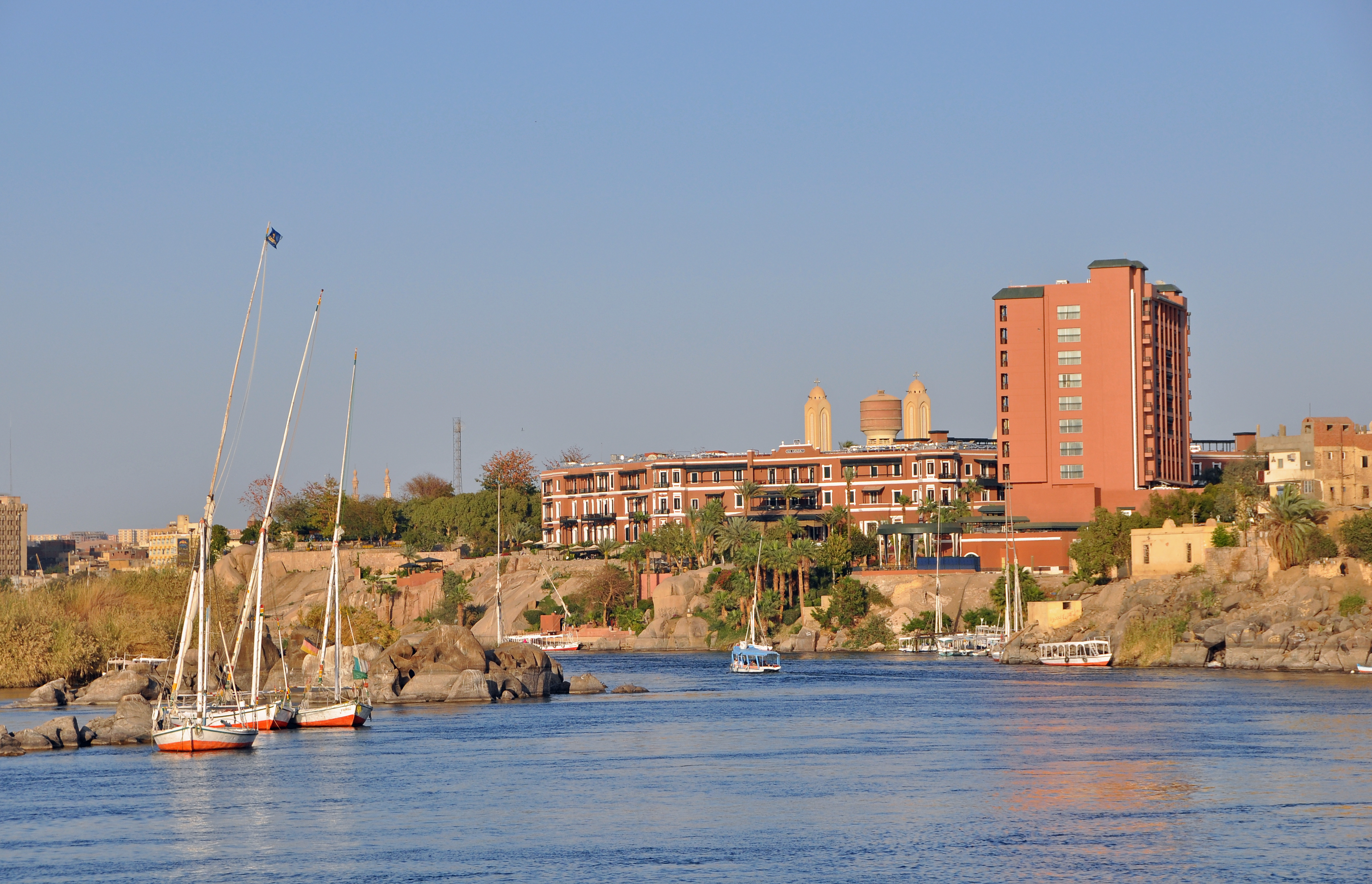
- Old Cataract Hotel, showing the original 1899 hotel and the 1961 tower wing.
- Interactive map of the Old Cataract Hotel area

General information
- Location: Aswan, Egypt
- Opening: January 8, 1900
- Owner: Legacy Hotels
- Operator: Mandarin Oriental Hotel Group

Design and construction
- Developer: Thomas Cook

The Old Cataract Hotel is an historic British colonial-era hotel located on the banks of the River Nile in Aswan, Egypt. Built by Thomas Cook, it opened in 1900 as the Cataract Hotel. In 1961, the hotel was expanded with a new tower wing.

== History ==
The Cataract Hotel was built in 1899 by Thomas Cook to house European travelers to Assouan (as Aswan was then known). It opened on January 8, 1900. The 120-room, two-story hotel was so successful that a third story was added in 1902, with 100 additional rooms, along with a dining room, designed by architect Henri Favarger.

Its guests have included Tsar Nicholas II, Winston Churchill, Howard Carter, Margaret Thatcher, Jimmy Carter, François Mitterrand, Princess Diana, Queen Noor and Agatha Christie, who set portions of her novel Death on the Nile at the hotel. The 1978 film of the novel was shot at the hotel.

A new modern tower wing was built in 1961. It was known as the New Cataract Hotel and operated as a budget wing of the hotel for many years, while the original wing was eventually renamed the Old Cataract Hotel. In 1973 United States Secretary of State Dr Henry Kissinger and his aides stayed in the New Cataract Hotel during the negotiations to end the Yom Kippur War. In the 1990s, the French Accor hotel company assumed management of both the Old Cataract and the New Cataract, placing them first in their Pullman Hotels division, and then in their Sofitel division.

Both wings of the hotel were closed from 2008 to 2011 for a complete restoration, during which the 1961 New Cataract tower was combined with the historic Old Cataract wing into one hotel. The Old Cataract wing, which previously had 131 rooms and eight suites, was renamed the Palace Wing, and rebuilt to house 76 rooms and 45 suites. The New Cataract wing, which previously had 144 rooms, was renamed the Nile Wing, rebuilt with 62 rooms including 37 suites, all with a balcony with a river view. The hotel reopened on October 18, 2011, as the Sofitel Legend Old Cataract Aswan.

Egypt's CBC used the Old Cataract as the primary filming location for its musalsal adaptation of the popular Spanish series Gran Hotel in 2016. In 20 December 2023, Icon Company, a subsidiary of Talaat Moustafa Group, acquired 51% of Legacy Hotels Company, which owns the hotel.

Mandarin Oriental assumed management of the hotel on May 1, 2026. The historic wing remains open, while the tower wing is under renovation. The hotel will be renamed Mandarin Oriental Old Cataract, Aswan in July 2027, at the completion of the renovations.

== Gallery ==
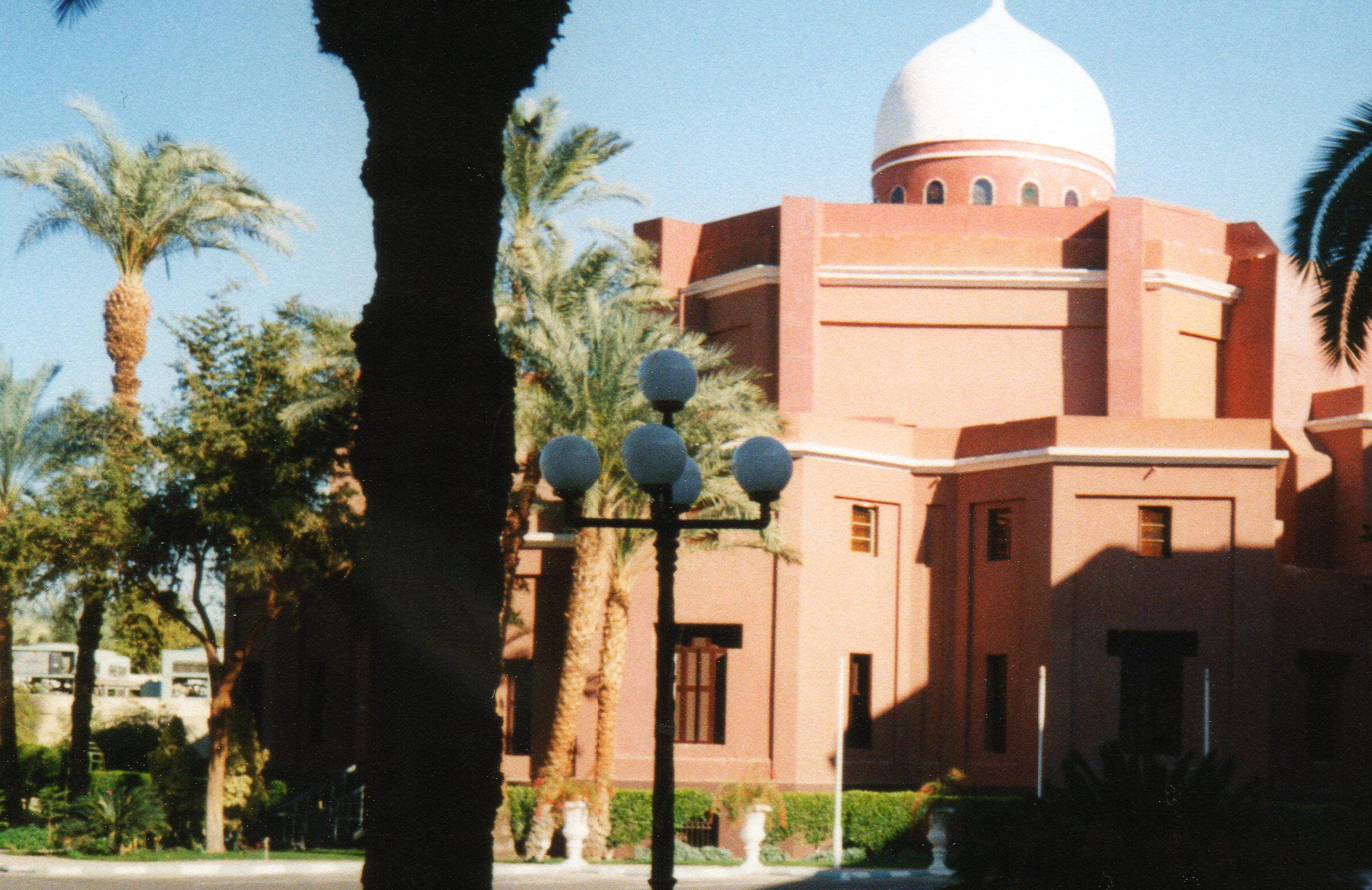
Outdoor view of the Old Cataract dining room.

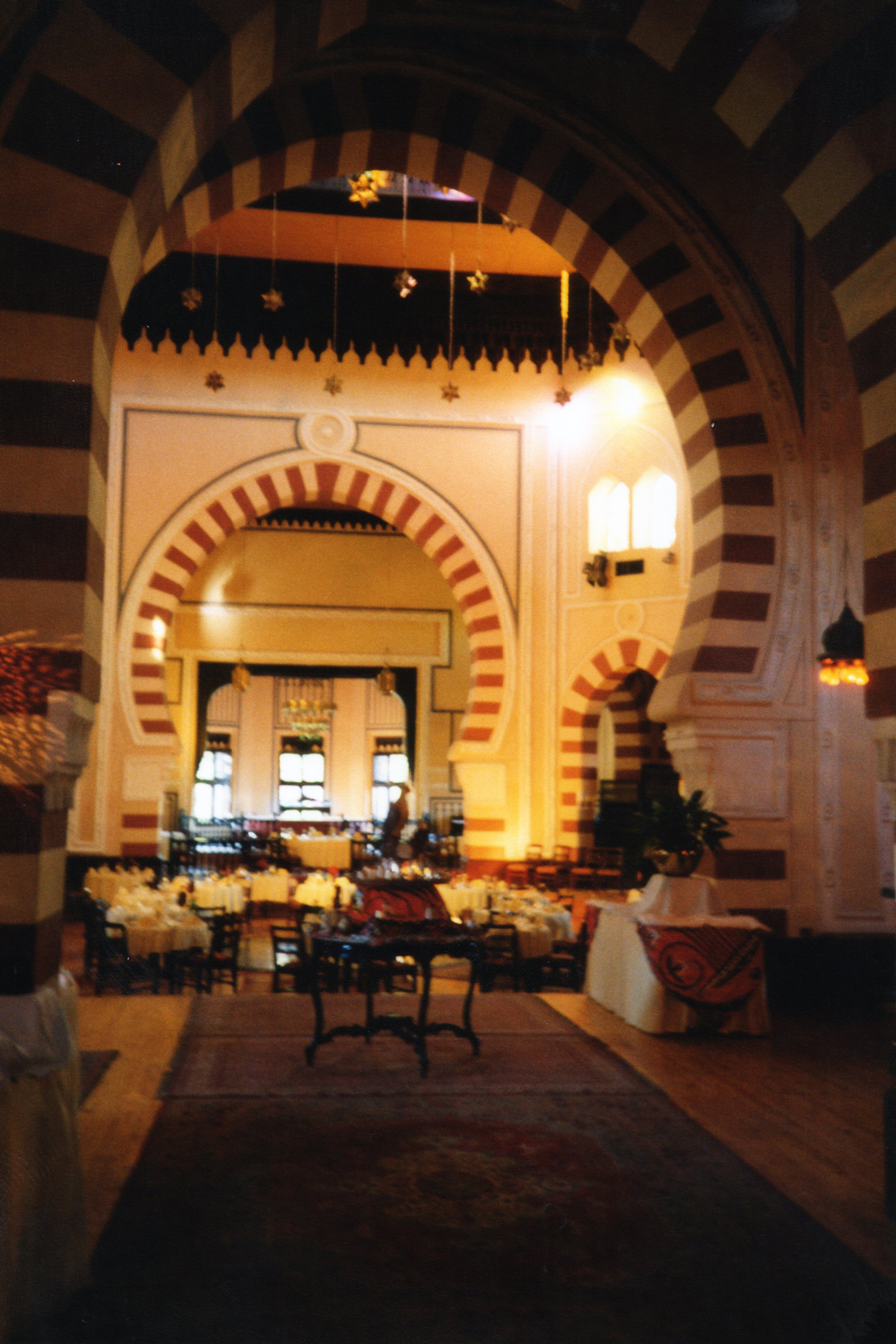
Inside the Old Cataract dining room.

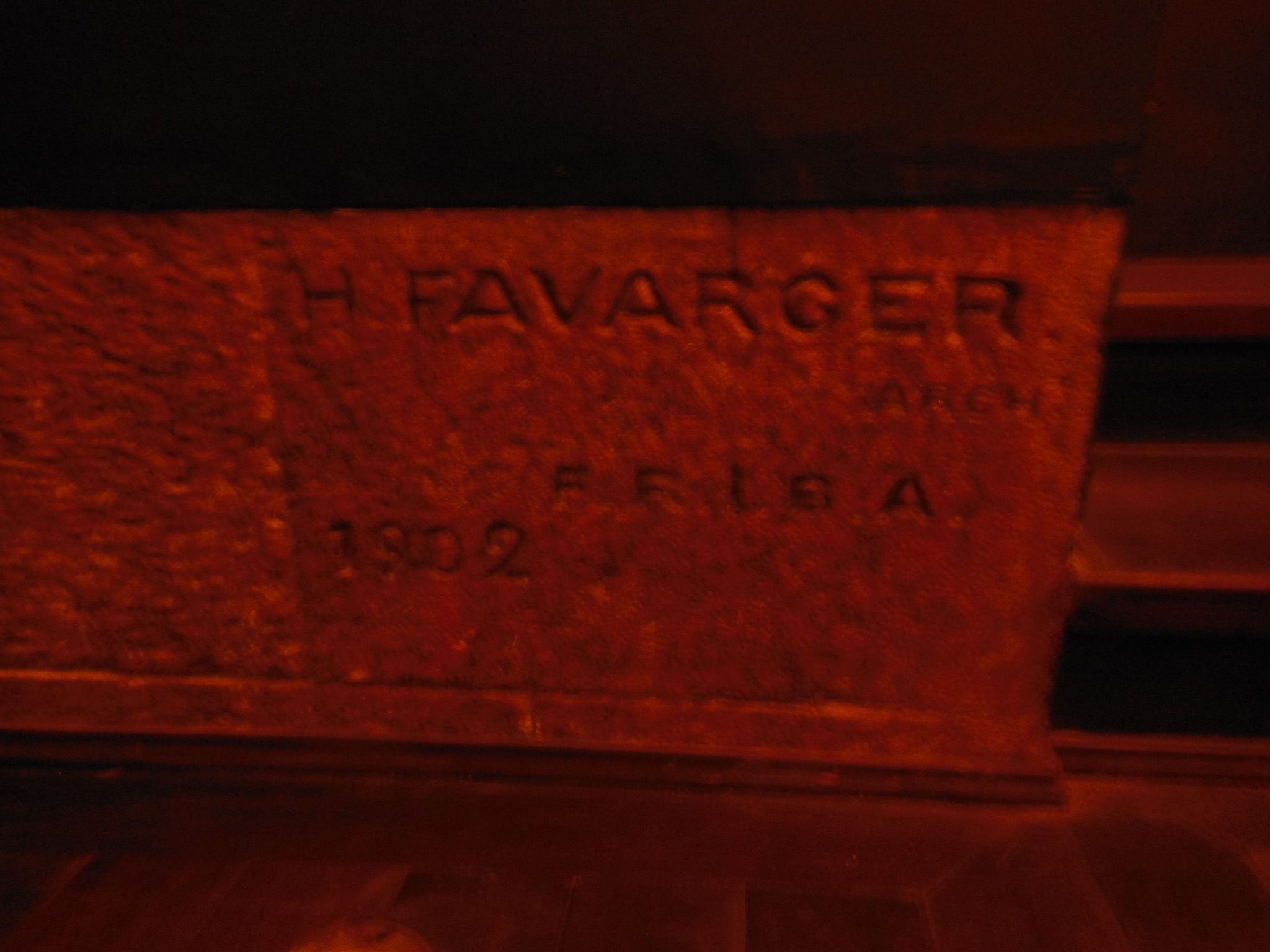
Architect's mark

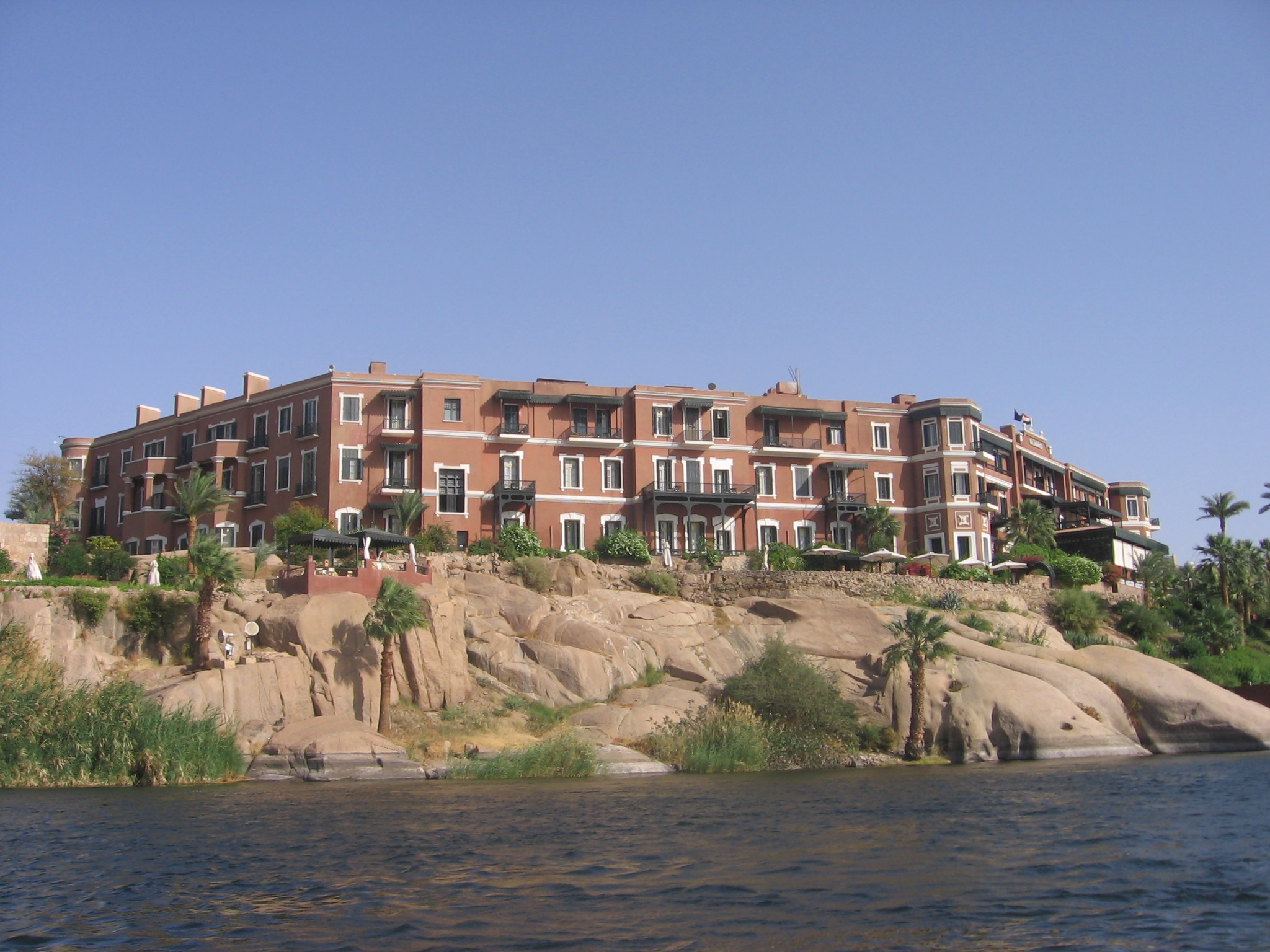
Old Cataract from the Nile.
