= Hubert de Malherbe =

- Born: 24 December 1964; Neuilly-sur-Seine
- Website: malherbe.paris

Hubert de Malherbe or Hubert Blay de Malherbe, born 24 December 1964 in Paris, is a French designer, considered the leader of commercial space design based on the analysis of purchasing behaviors. Regularly defined as the scenographer of all forms of commerce, he has enjoyed international renown since the 2000s.

He is the founder of the creative agency "MALHERBE PARIS," based in Paris since 1993. The agency has three subsidiaries: Shanghai (since 2010), Hong Kong (since 2011), and New York (since 2021). In 2024 it employed 200 people in total, generating more than 50% of its revenue outside France.

== Biography ==
Hubert de Malherbe grew up in Versailles inmersed in a creative milieu rooted in both family bonds and warm friendships. He is a graduate engineer from the École nationale supérieure d’Arts et Métiers, class of 1988. On July 14, 1989, he was awarded the National Defense Medal during his military service for developing an automatic riveting machine that improved safety in workshops.

He founded the agency Malherbe Paris in 1993 becoming quickly focused on the intersection of spatial design and the performance of rapidly expanding retail spaces. He designed the Magellan concept for the Casino chain in 1999, created the Mag 3 concept for Intermarché in 2001, renovated more than 300 Leclerc hypermarkets in the 2000s and developed the first French 100% organic supermarket concept, Naturéo, in 2007.

Early on, he developed an interest in eco-friendly design and the carbon footprint of retail spaces, as exemplified by his designs for the French brands Jules and Gémo, which respectively incorporate clothing recycling techniques and feature local artists.

Sa rencontre avec Bernard Arnault en 2000 va lui permettre d'appliquer son savoir faire aux boutiques Parfums Christian Dior. L’agence Malherbe Paris accompagne toujours la marque de nos jours avec la même intensité.

In 2010, Hubert de Malherbe was approached by Jacques Lévy, president of Sephora, and took part in the renovation of the flagship store on the Champs-Élysées. A few years later, he was entrusted with a large part of the renovation of the store network in mainland China and Hong Kong.

Alongside the growth of his agency, he promotes French savoir-faire, which he sought to bring to international markets. Building on this growing reputation, international projects are multiplying: Paris Miki in Japan, Americana in the Middle East, the Jeddah Airport for ADP Group, Bilka and Fotex in Scandinavia, the Chalhoub Group in Dubai, Notino in Poland, Cidade Matarazzo in São Paulo, Mandarin Oriental in Hong Kong, etc.

Expanding across Southeast Asia, he designed a wave of shopping centers for SM Group in the Philippines, for Central Group and Masan in Vietnam, and for Bluebell in Cambodia, as luxury brands sought a stronger physical presence throughout the region.

His relationship with LVMH deepened over the following years. He created the perfume boutique concepts for Givenchy in 2013, designed the boutique concept for jeweler Fred in 2014, delivered several projects for the duty-free operator DFS — including the flagship Sun Plaza store in Tsim Sha Tsui — and began a lasting collaboration with Guerlain through the production of animated films. Claude Martinez, who led Parfums Christian Dior from 2001 to 2019 and now serves as president of LVMH Gaïa, described him as "a great creative" who meets every problem "with a thousand proposals." To support this growing communications work, Malherbe Paris launched a dedicated subsidiary, Medusa, offering brand platform and identity services, packaging, digital campaigns, and content creation.

A licensed pilot and lifelong aviation enthusiast, Malherbe brought his design sensibility to the Daher group starting in 2015, contributing to cabin design and communications for the TBM single-turboprop line, an aircraft he has championed as a model of the efficient, low-impact flying he believes the industry is moving toward.^{,}

From 2014 to 2020, Malherbe Paris took part in the extensive renovation of La Samaritaine, designing what is now the largest beauty department in Europe. Between 2015 and 2019, BFM Business gave him a recurring segment on its program Innover pour le commerce, hosted by Karine Vergniol.

In 2016, he was commissioned to design the entirety of the Place Vendôme shopping center in Doha, Qatar, a project spanning more than one million square meters and nearly 600 boutiques in a style drawn from classical French architecture. Two years later, he answered a request from Groupe ADP for a striking yet reassuring symbol at Paris-Charles de Gaulle Airport: an eight-meter sculpture of a sleeping cat set within a landscaped rest area.

From 2018 onward, he began a close collaboration with Hennessy, designing the brand's boutique within the Taikoo Li shopping complex in Pudong, Shanghai., In 2020, working with longtime collaborator Thierry Lemaire, he launched Greenkiss, an eco-conscious furniture line presented at Maison&Objet and manufactured by Paolo Castelli in Bologna.

His relationship with Mandarin Oriental has since extended from retail into hotel design itself, starting in 2024 with Medusa, the agency's branding and communication wing, leading the group's global rebranding. The project won Gold in the Visual Identity Redesign category at the 2025 Grand Prix Stratégies du Luxe. Following this first success, the group selected him to redesign the public spaces of its two founding flagship properties, Mandarin Oriental Hong Kong and Mandarin Oriental Bangkok, as part of a renovation exceeding $100 million, alongside designers Jeffrey Wilkes and Thierry Lemaire.

In 2026, he published Dandy Crush (Skira Editore), co-written with Mandarin Oriental Hotel Group CEO Laurent Kleitman, a personal narrative tracing the history of a Jaguar XK120 through memory, design, and desire. The booked was publicly launched at an event at the Mandarin Oriental Hyde Park in London on June 29, 2026.

Malherbe's work has drawn sustained coverage in the French press. He has been profiled twice by Forbes France (2017, 2021) and by Les Echos (2026), which portrayed him as a restlessly creative figure at the head of a 220-person agency. In January 2026, Le Figaro called him the "dandy of luxury retail," a characterization Forbes France had echoed years earlier, describing him as a "whimsical dandy boss." His Paris apartment was later featured in Marie Claire Maison as an extension of the same design philosophy into domestic space.
