= Brickell Key =

Brickell Key Claughton Island
- Neighborhood of Miami
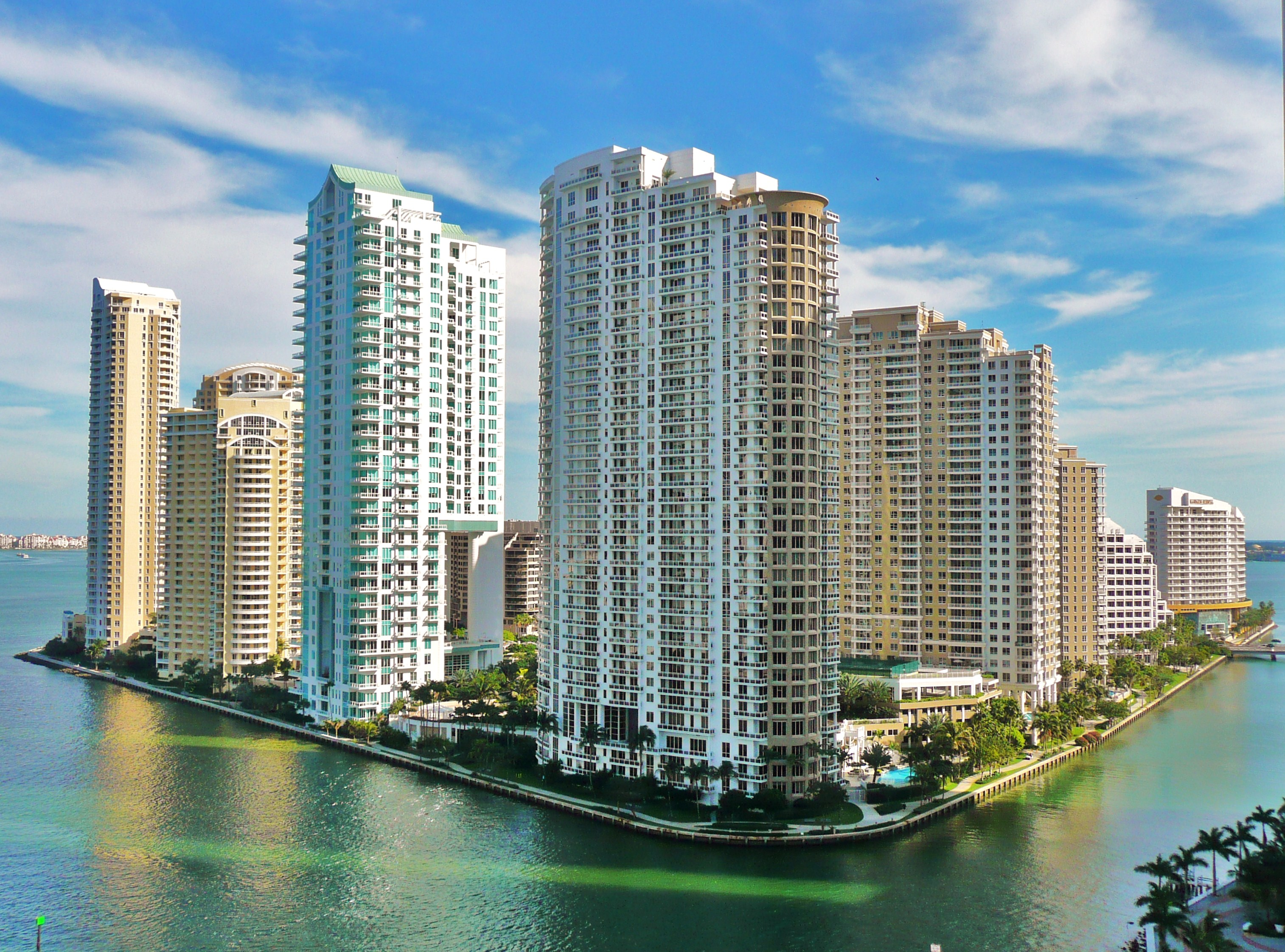
- Brickell Key from the northwest, February 2010

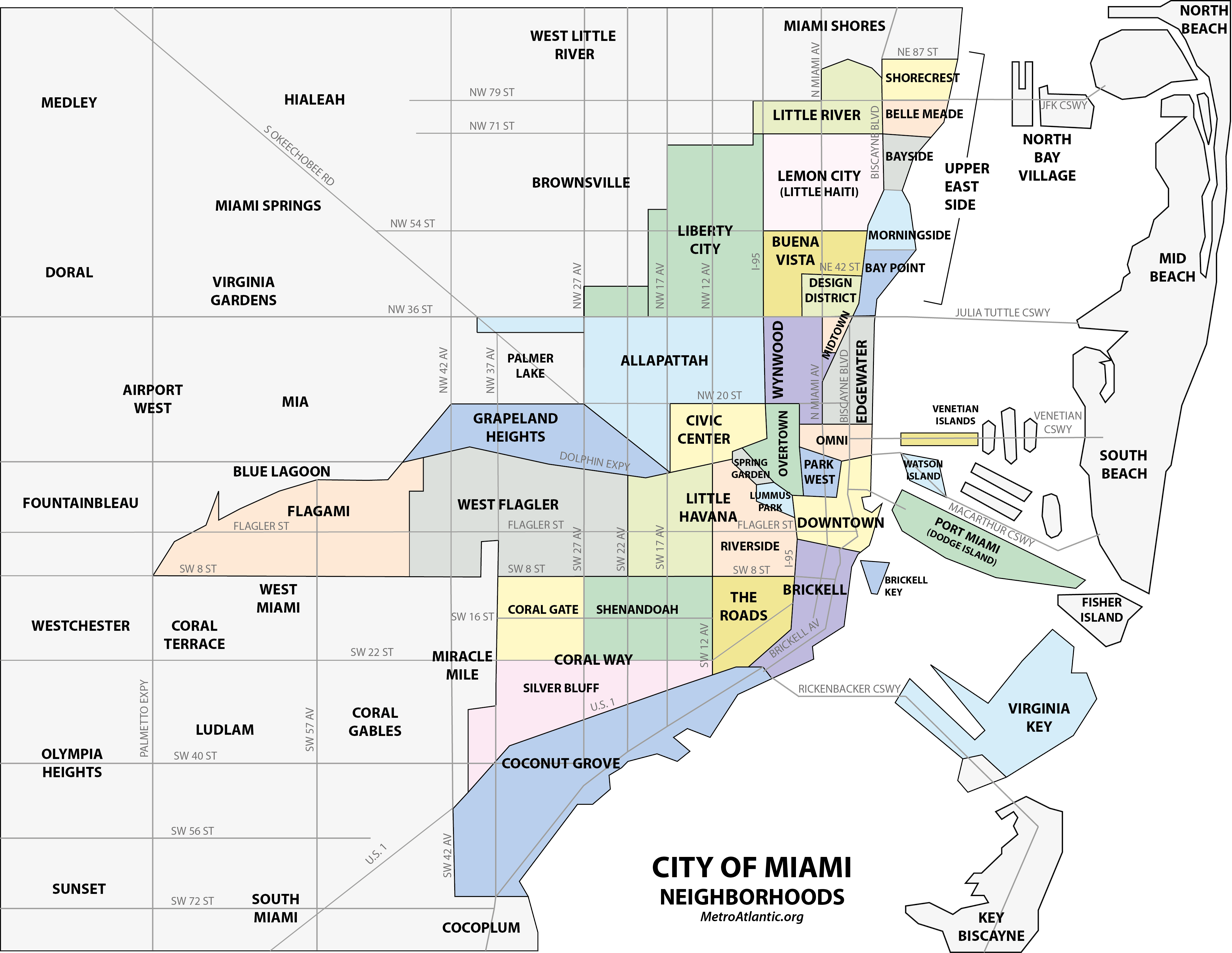
- Brickell Key within the Brickell neighborhood of Miami city proper
- Coordinates: 25.824385°N 80.190711°W
- Country: United States
- State: Florida
- County: Miami-Dade County
- City: Miami

Government
  - City of Miami Commissioner: Ken Russell
  - Miami-Dade Commissioner: Joe Carollo
  - House of Representatives: Christopher Benjamin (D)
  - State Senate: Ileana Garcia (R)
  - U.S. House: María Elvira Salazar (R)
- Elevation: 3 ft (0.91 m)

Population (2010)
  - Total: 2,189
- Time zone: UTC-05 (EST)
- ZIP Code: 33131
- Area codes: 305, 786

Brickell Key is a man-made island off the mainland Brickell neighborhood of Miami, Florida. Also called Claughton Island, the neighborhood is just east of Downtown Miami and the Miami River.

== History ==
In 1896, Henry Flagler organized a 9-foot (2.7 m) deep channel dug from the Miami River mouth, creating two islands in the process. In 1943, Edward N. Claughton, Sr. bought the Brickell Key islands and other land to combine them into a 44-acre (180,000 m^{2}) triangle-shaped tract. In the late 1970s, Swire Properties bought most of the island from Claughton. Since then the island has been built out with some of the tallest buildings in Miami as well as the Mandarin Oriental, Miami hotel, most of which were built during the condo "Manhattanization" wave of the 2000s.

== Demographics ==
As of 2020, the population of Brickell Key had 20,558 people (excluding the demographics and population of Brickell and Mary Brickell Village). The ZIP code for Brickell is 33131. The area covers 0.162 square miles (0.42 km^{2}). As of 2020, there were 10,412 males and 10,146 females. The median age for males was 33.9 years old, while the median age for females was 31.9 years old. The average household size had 1.7 people, while the average family size had 2.5 members. The percentage of married-couple families (among all households) was 30.6%, while the percentage of married-couple families with children (among all households) was 8.2%, and the percentage of single-mother households (among all households) was 1.4%. The percentage of never-married males 15 years old and over was 24.4%, while the percentage of never-married females 15 years old and over was 16.4%.

As of 2000, people who speak English not well or not at all, made up 5.9% of the population. The percentage of residents born in Florida was 14.9%, the percentage of people born in another U.S. state was 29.1%, and the percentage of native residents but born outside the U.S. was 4.7%, while the percentage of foreign born residents was 51.3%.

== Gallery ==
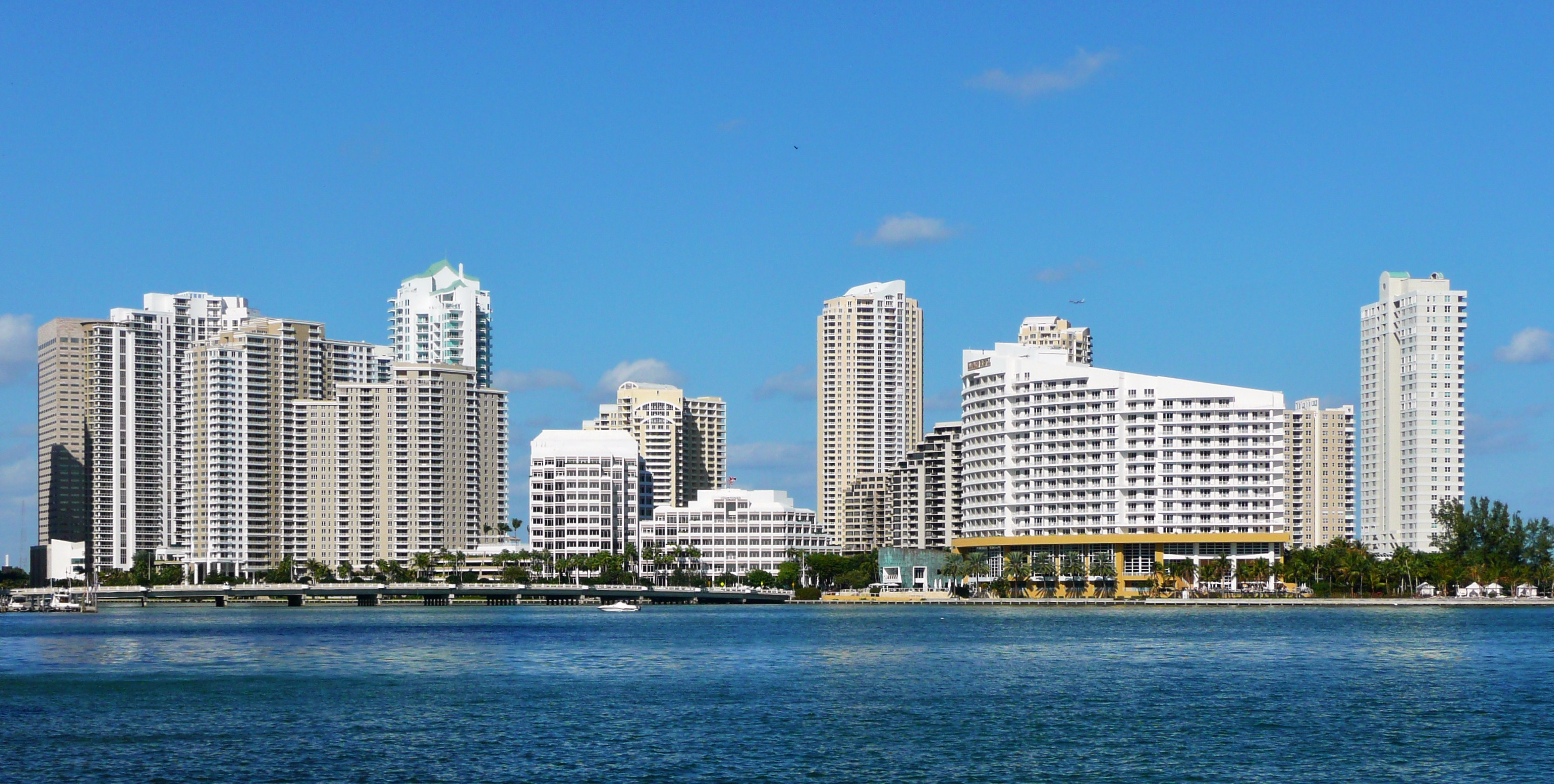
Brickell Key from the south, February 2010

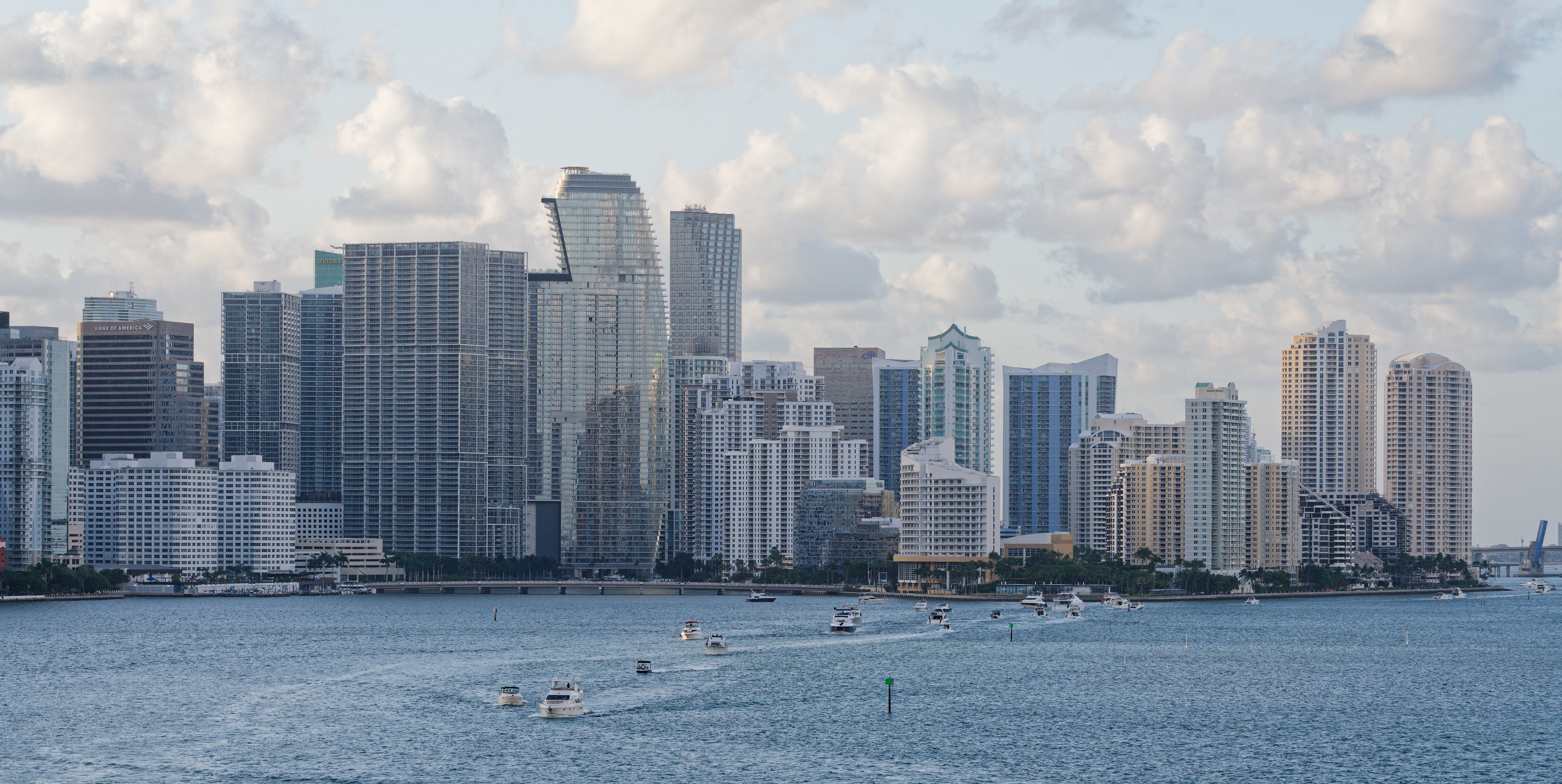
Brickell Key and Brickell
