= Asiate =

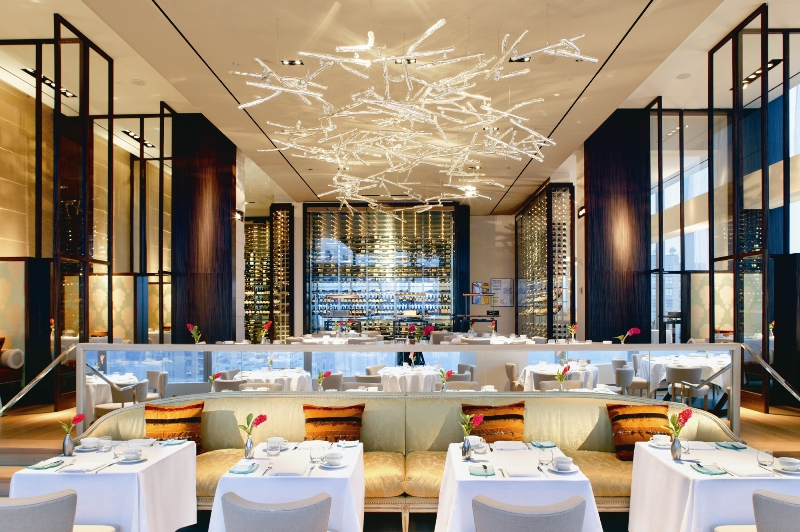
- Asiate

- Location in Manhattan

Restaurant information
- Established: 2003; 23 years ago
- Chef: Cyril Renaud
- Food type: Contemporary American
- Location: In the Mandarin Oriental, New York hotel, on the 35th floor of 80 Columbus Circle (West 60th Street at Broadway), in Manhattan, New York City, New York County, New York, 10023, United States
- Coordinates: 40.767936°N 73.982446°W
- Website: MandarinOriental.com/.../Asiate/

Asiate was a Contemporary American restaurant located in the Mandarin Oriental, New York hotel, on the 35th floor of 80 Columbus Circle (West 60th Street at Broadway) in Manhattan, New York City.

It opened in December 2003. The Executive Chef is Cyril Renaud.

== Reviews ==
In 2014, Zagat's gave it a food rating of 25, and a decor rating of 28. Zagat's ranked it # 1 in New York City for decor (as it had in 2013).

== See also ==
- List of New American restaurants
