= Mandarin Oriental, Miami =

Hotel in Miami, Florida, United States

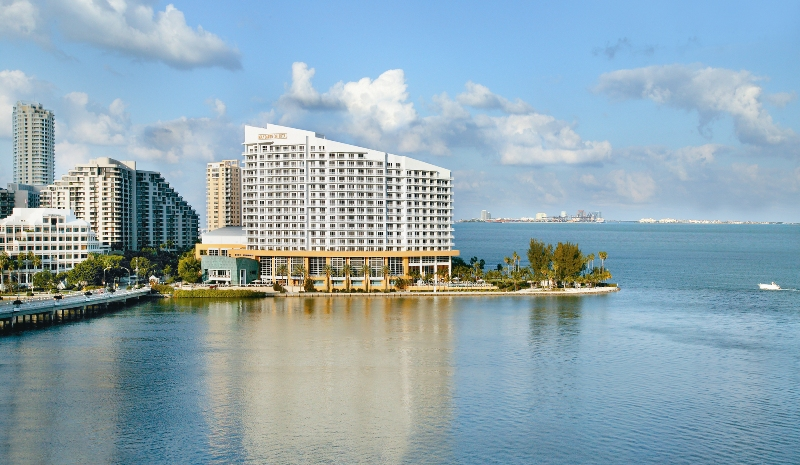

General information
- Location: 500 Brickell Key Drive; Miami, Florida
- Coordinates: 25.76500°N 80.18536°W
- Opening: 2000
- Closed: May 31, 2025; 16 months ago
- Demolished: April 12, 2026
- Operator: Mandarin Oriental Hotel Group

Height
- Height: 74.37 m (244.0 ft)

Technical details
- Floor count: 18

Design and construction
- Architect: RTKL Associates

Other information
- Number of rooms: 295
- Number of suites: 31
- Number of restaurants: Azul; La Mar by Gaston Acurio; MO Bar + Lounge

Website
- www.mandarinoriental.com/miami/

Mandarin Oriental, Miami was a luxury hotel on Brickell Key in Miami, Florida, overlooking Biscayne Bay, opened in November 2000 and managed by Mandarin Oriental Hotel Group. It was on the southern tip of Brickell Key, a 44 acres (18 ha), a man-made island built in 1943.

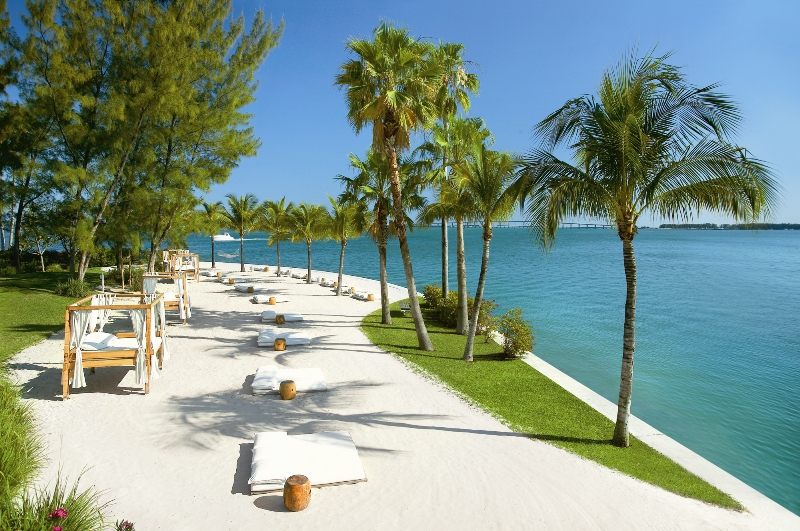
Oasis Beach Club overlooking Biscayne Bay

The hotel contained 295 guestrooms and 31 suites with balconies and terraces, restaurants and bars, 15,000 sq ft (1,400 m^{2}) of events facilities, and the only Forbes Travel Guide Five-Star spa in Florida.

Plans for construction of a larger complex on the site were unveiled in 2024. The building was demolished by implosion on April 12, 2026 to make way for construction of the new complex. A residential and hotel complex with a 66 story and 34 story tower containing a total of 326 private residences and 121 hotel guest rooms will be constructed on the site, scheduled to open in 2030.

In 2026 the residences were sold for $1.7 billion.

== See also ==
- Mandarin Oriental Hotel Group
- Mandarin Oriental, Hong Kong
- Mandarin Oriental, Bangkok
- Mandarin Oriental Hyde Park, London
- Mandarin Oriental, New York
