= Mandarin Oriental, Singapore =

Hotel skyscraper in Singapore

Coordinates: 1°17′27″N 103°51′29″E

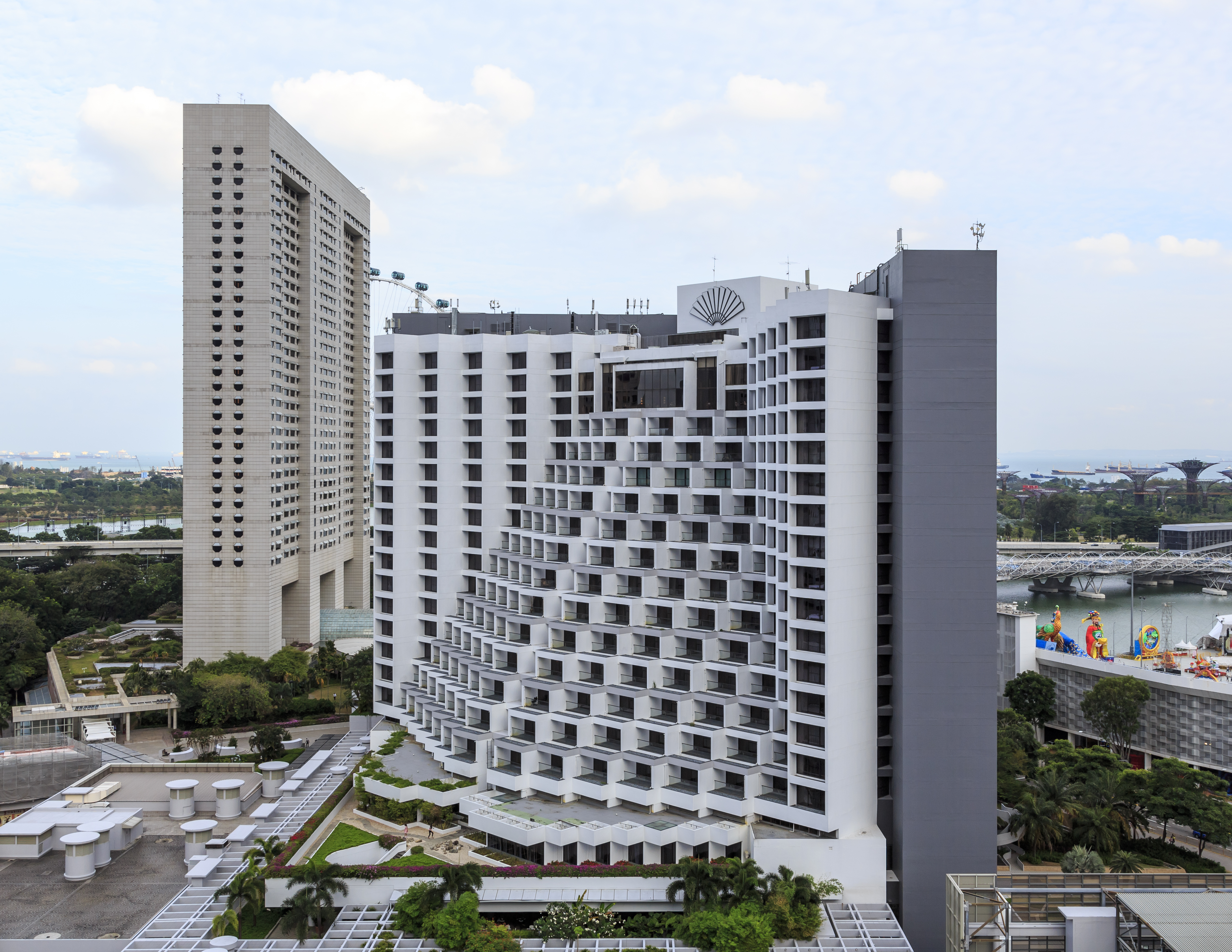

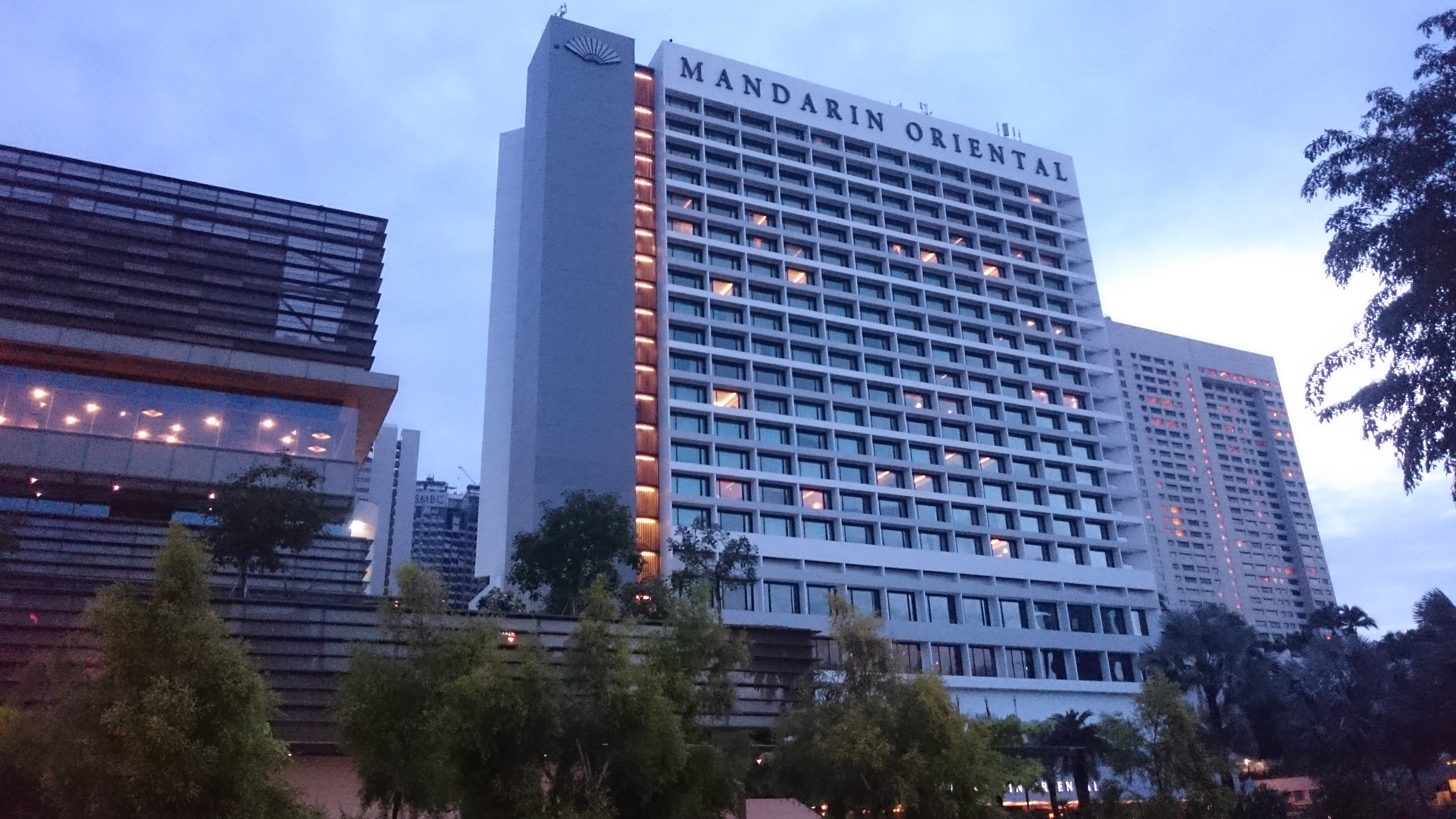
- front and back views of Mandarin Oriental, Singapore
- Interactive map of the Mandarin Oriental, Singapore area

General information
- Location: 5 Raffles Avenue, Marina Square, Singapore 039797
- Opening: 1987
- Owner: Mandarin Oriental Hotel Group and Marina Centre Holdings Private Limited
- Operator: Mandarin Oriental Hotel Group

Technical details
- Floor count: 24

Design and construction
- Architect: John Portman

Other information
- Number of rooms: 510
- Number of restaurants: 10

Website
- http://www.mandarinoriental.com/singapore/

Mandarin Oriental, Singapore is a luxury hotel located in Marina Centre next to Marina Square Shopping Mall and near Suntec City, home to one of Asia Pacific's largest convention centers – the Suntec Singapore International Convention and Exhibition Centre, and the city's financial district. The hotel includes 510 rooms and suites, 10 restaurants and bars, and a Spa at Mandarin Oriental, Singapore.

== Overview ==
Mandarin Oriental is located in Marina Centre, Singapore. Opened in 1987 as The Oriental Singapore, the hotel underwent renovations in 2004 and 2023. In both 2010 and 2011, Mandarin Oriental, Singapore was named in Condé Nast Traveler's Gold List.

The hotel's 510 rooms and suites overlook the Singapore city skyline. US Architect John Portman designed the atrium-style hotel based on a theatre concept and intended the exterior of the structure to resemble a fan, a nod to the Mandarin Oriental logo.

The hotel houses ten restaurants and bars and a club lounge. The Oriental Club is the largest hotel lounge in Singapore.

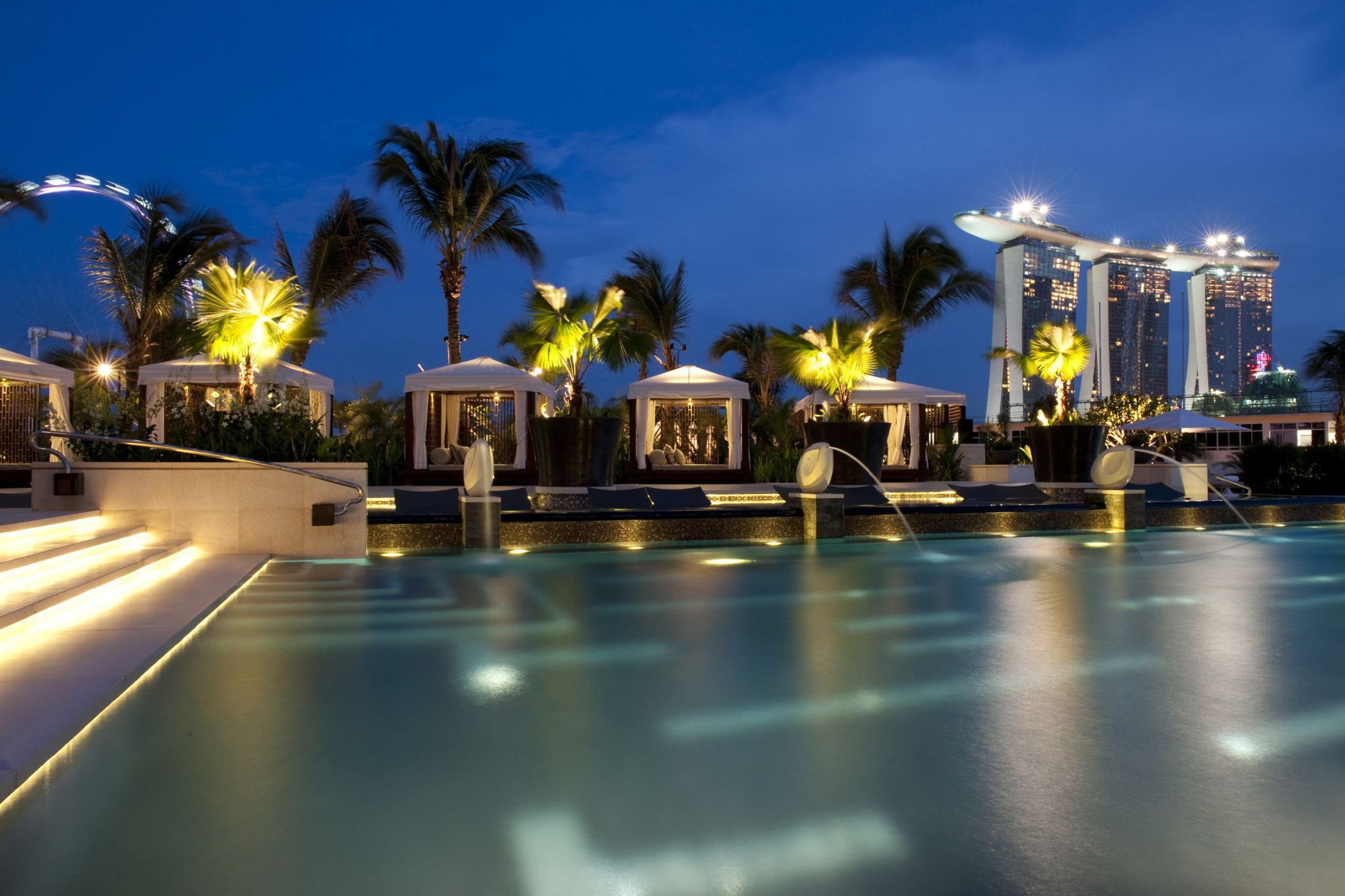
Pool Area at Mandarin Oriental, Singapore

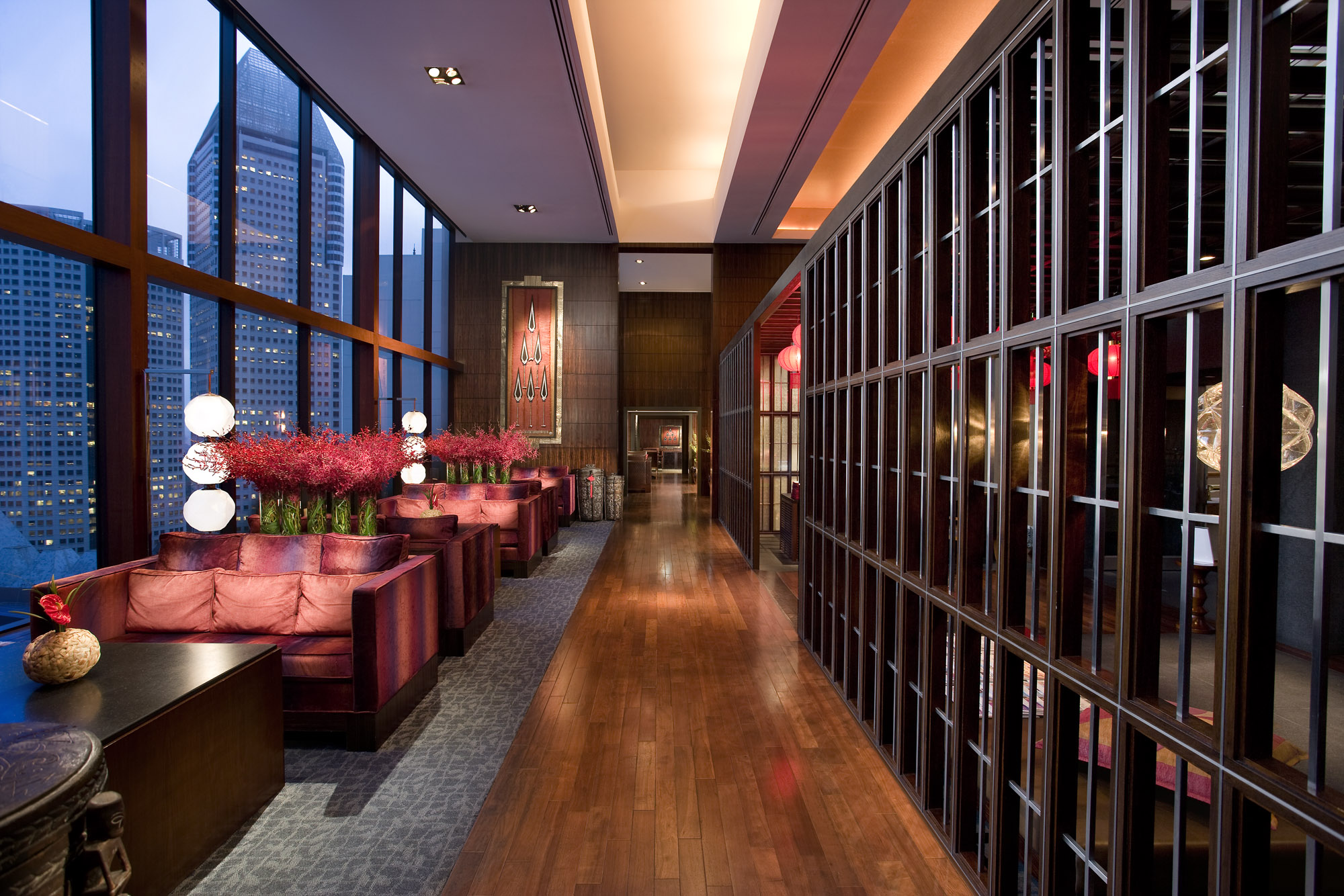
Oriental Club at Mandarin Oriental, Singapore

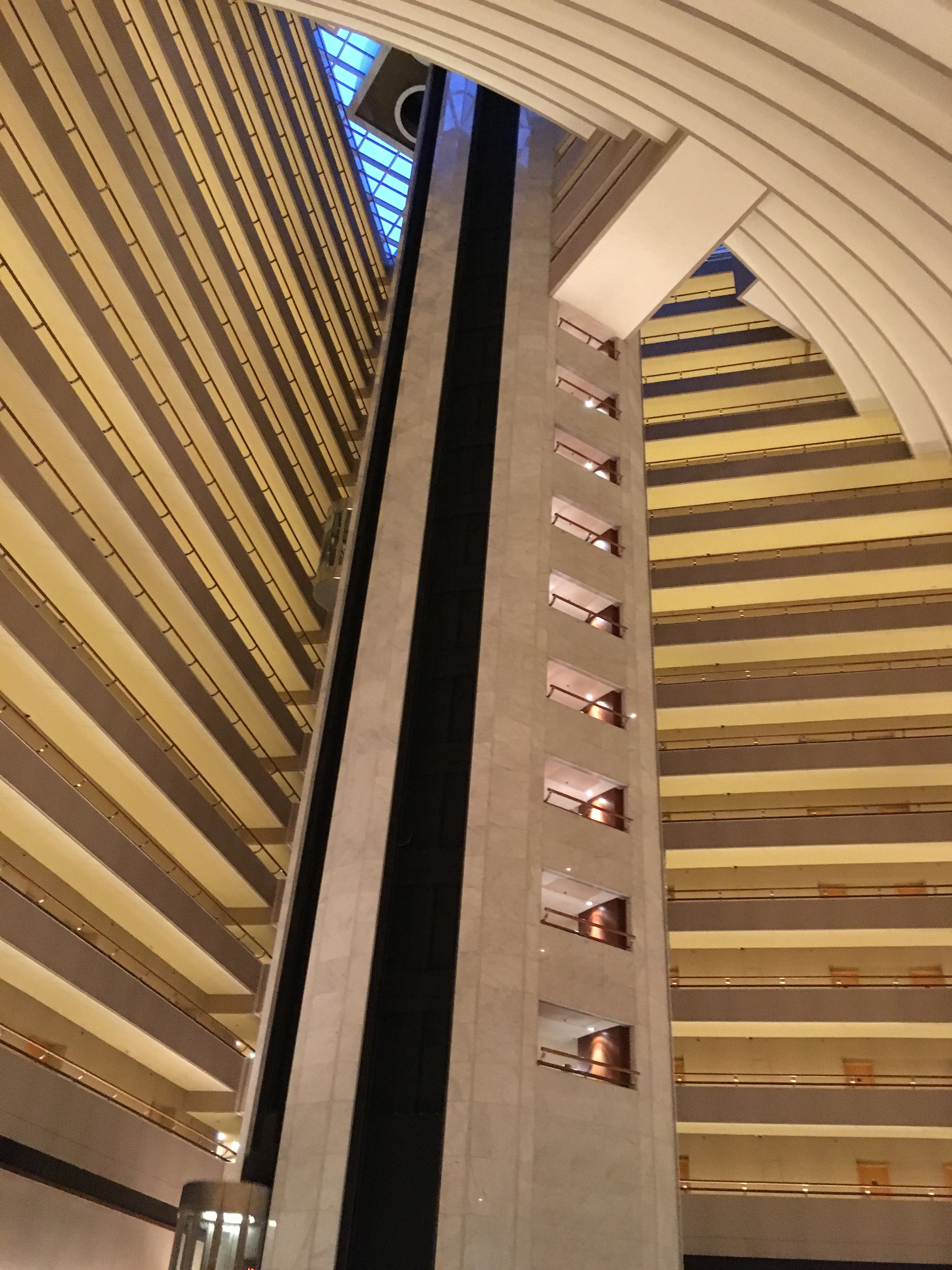
Interior view of Mandarin Oriental Singapore

== See also ==
- Mandarin Oriental Hotel Group
