= Mandarin Oriental, Barcelona =

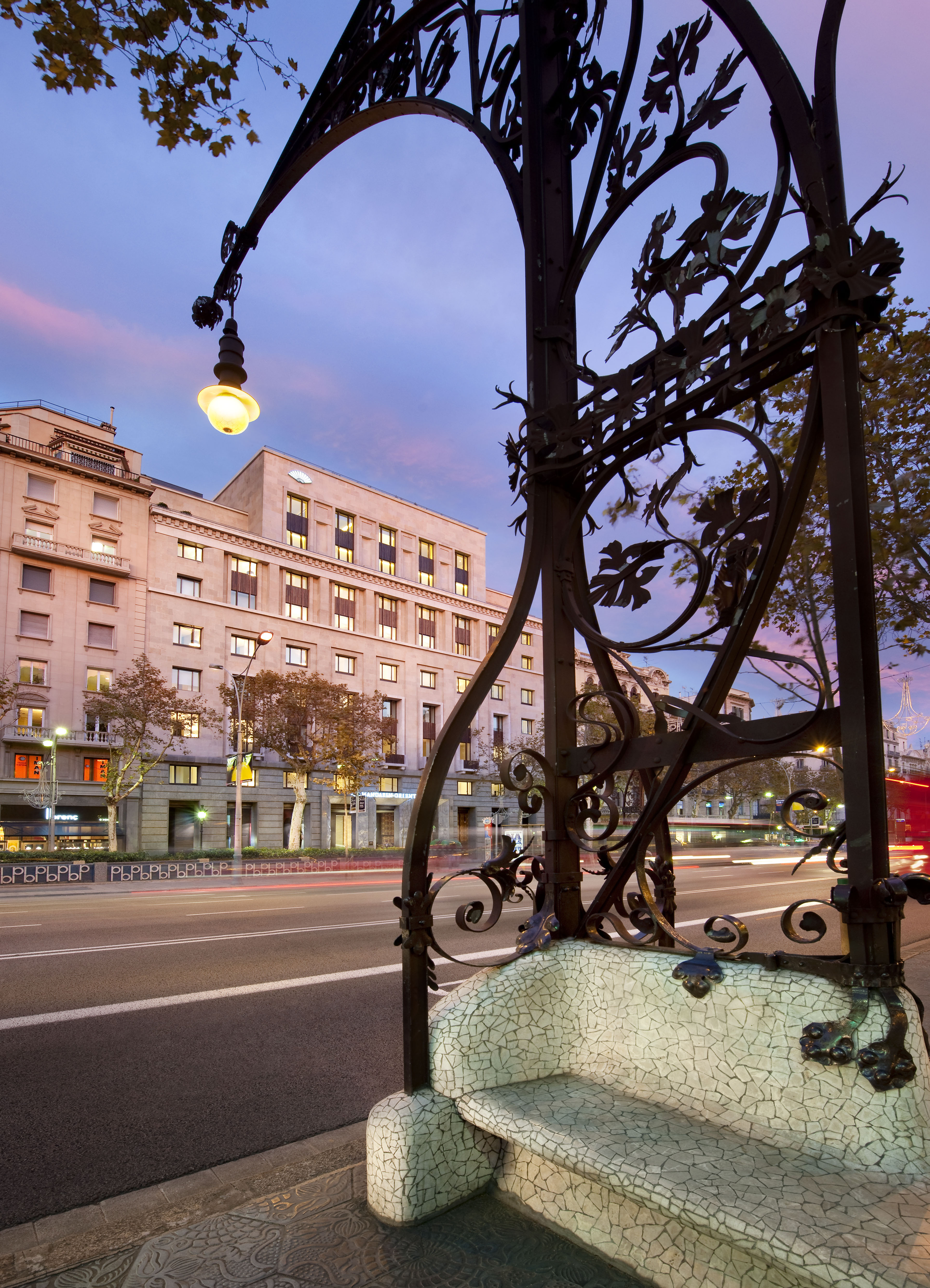
- Interactive map of the Mandarin Oriental, Barcelona area

General information
- Location: Passeig de Gràcia, 38-40, Barcelona 08007 Spain
- Coordinates: 41°23′28.9″N 02°10′00.8″E
- Opening: 2009
- Operator: Mandarin Oriental Hotel Group

Design and construction
- Architects: Carlos Ferrater and Joan Trias de Bes

Other information
- Number of rooms: 120
- Number of restaurants: 5

Website
- https://www.mandarinoriental.com/barcelona/

Mandarin Oriental, Barcelona is a hotel located on Passeig de Gràcia in Barcelona, Spain. It opened in November 2009 and was designed in part by Spanish architects Carlos Ferrater and Joan Trias de Bes, and interior designer Patricia Urquiola. The hotel is housed in a mid-20th-century building. Mandarin Oriental, Barcelona also includes The Spa at Mandarin Oriental, Barcelona and five restaurants and bars, including Moments, a Catalan restaurant headed up by Carme Ruscalleda, a Michelin-starred chef.

== Location ==
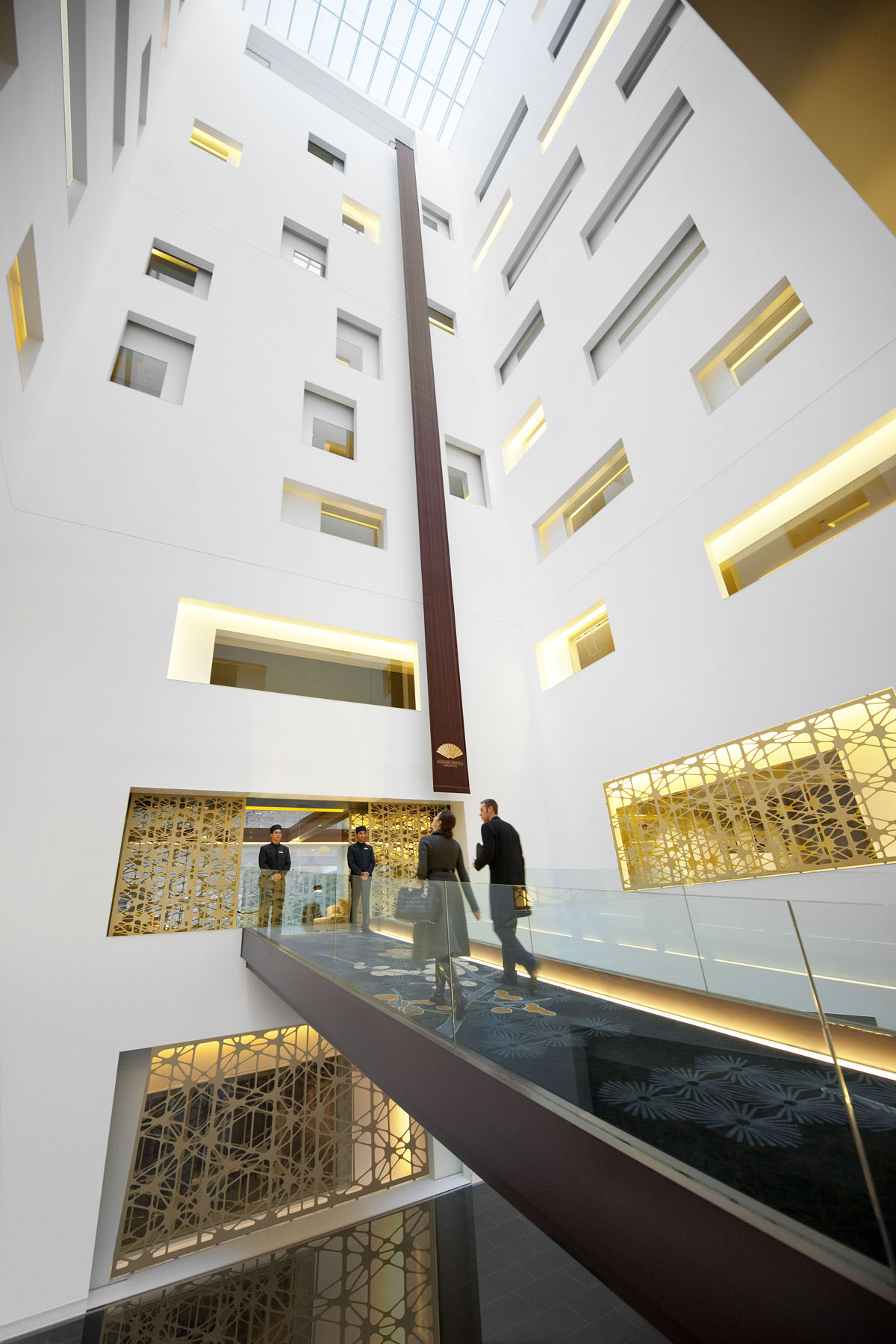
Entrance to Mandarin Oriental, Barcelona

Mandarin Oriental, Barcelona is located in the city's commercial and entertainment district on Passeig de Gràcia. Several of the city’s major tourist attractions are located close to the hotel, including the Gothic Quarter, Las Ramblas, and Gaudi's Casa Milà ("La Pedrera") and Casa Batlló.

== The hotel ==
The Mandarin Oriental, Barcelona, is housed in a renovated mid-20th century building and offers views of Passeig de Gràcia on one side and views of the hotel's landscaped interior garden on the other side.

== See also ==
- Mandarin Oriental Hotel Group
