= Mandarin Oriental, New York =

Hotel in Manhattan, New York

Coordinates: 40°46′09″N 73°58′59″W

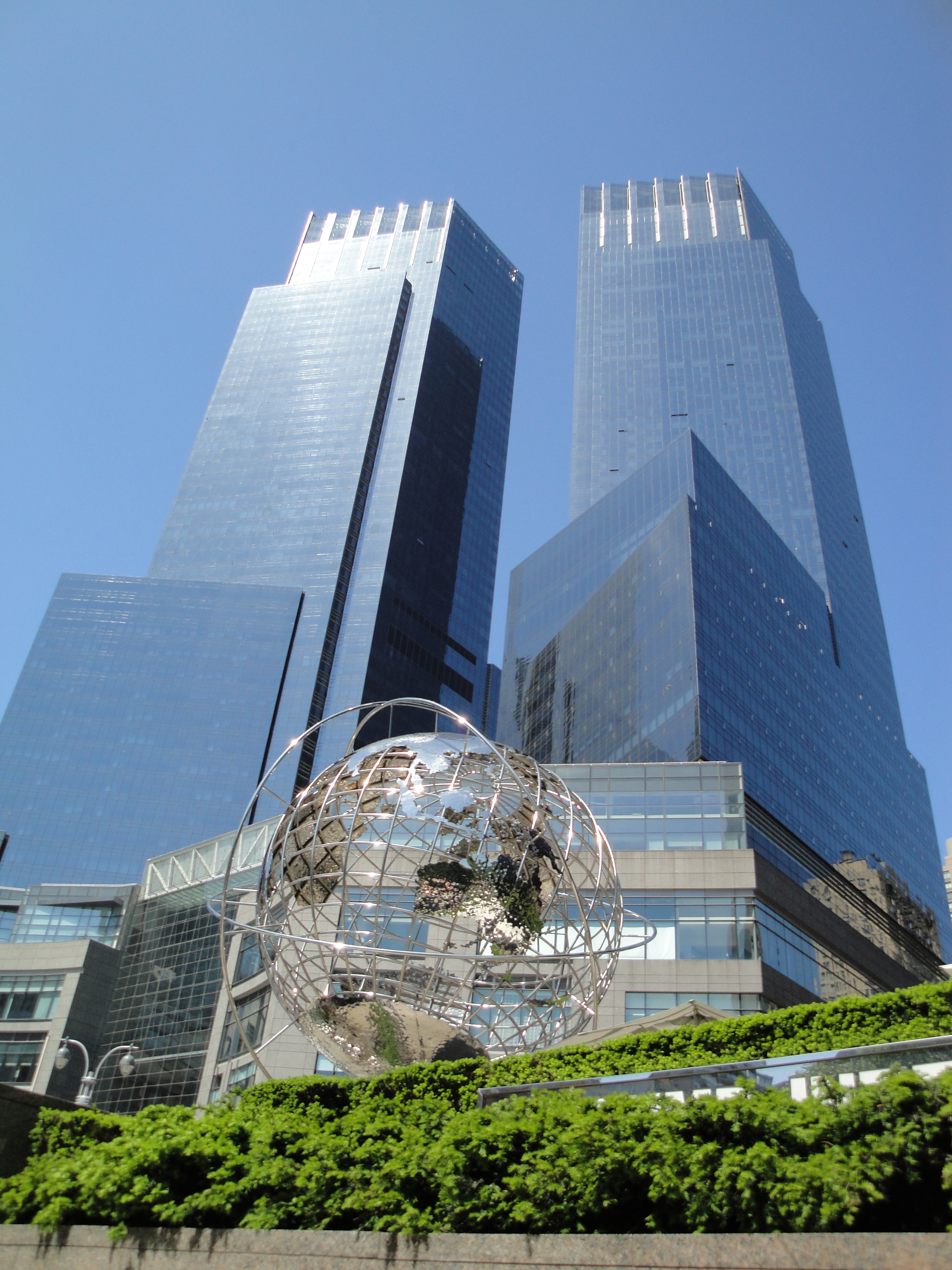
- View of Deutsche Bank Center from Central Park West

General information
- Location: 80 Columbus Circle at 60th Street; New York, New York 10023, Manhattan, New York City, United States
- Inaugurated: 1 December 2003
- Affiliation: Mandarin Oriental Hotel Group

Technical details
- Floor count: 46 floors (35th to 80th); North Tower

Design and construction
- Architecture firm: Brennan Beer Gorman; Skidmore, Owings & Merrill; Ismael Leyva Architects (interior)
- Other designers: Hirsch Bedner Associates (interior); Adam D. Tihany, Grant Achatz, Nick Kokonas (spa)

Other information
- Number of rooms: 202 rooms 46 suites 64 residences
- Number of restaurants: 2 (Asiate, The Aviary NYC)

Website
- https://www.mandarinoriental.com/en/new-york/manhattan

Mandarin Oriental, New York is a five-star luxury hotel located in Manhattan's Deutsche Bank Center at Columbus Circle in New York City, managed by Mandarin Oriental Hotel Group. A part of the multi-use Time Warner Center development, the hotel opened in December 2003. In addition to its 248 guestrooms and suites, the hotel provides services for 64 residences. The Mandarin Oriental has received many national and international awards, and operates one of only two Forbes Five-Star spas in Manhattan.

== Hotel ==
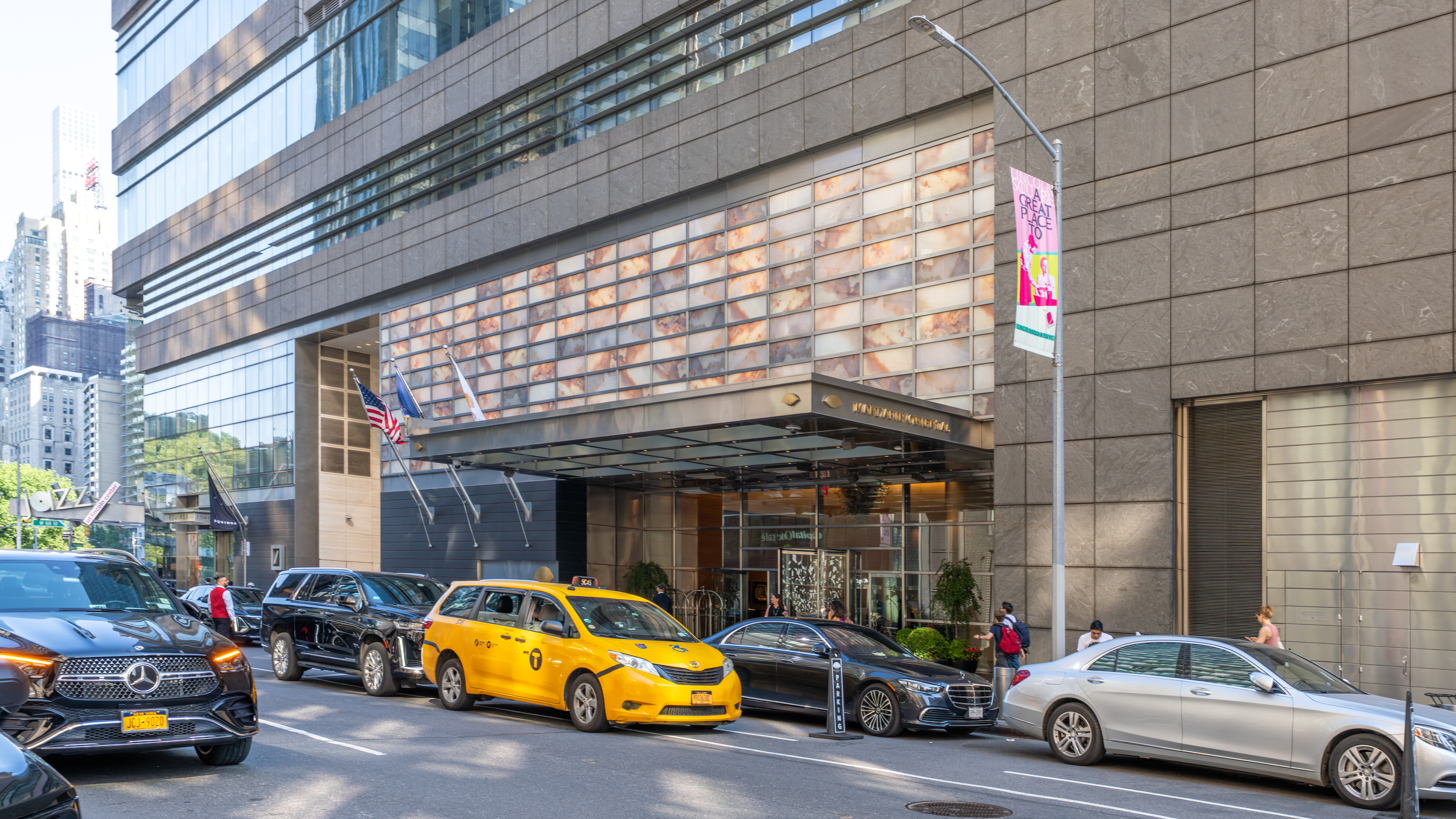
Entrance from W 60th St.

The Mandarin Oriental is located more than 280 feet (85 m) above ground in the north tower of the Deutsche Bank Center (formerly Time Warner Center), a 2,800,000-square-foot (260,000 m^{2}) mixed-use development at Columbus Circle. The AAA Five-Diamond awarded hotel contains 202 guestrooms and 46 suites on floors 35 to 54 with views of Central Park and the Hudson River.

Vivienne Tam, a noted New York fashion designer, designed the hotel’s signature fan, which is displayed in the hotel lobby. Dale Chihuly created two glass pieces installed in the hotel. The first is a chandelier, created in a unique collaboration with Waterford Crystal, weighing approximately 2,100 pounds and comprising 683 hand blown glass and crystal pieces. The second installation, located in the 35th floor lobby, is Chihuly’s first foray into glass gardens.

The hotel closed temporarily in 2020 during the COVID-19 pandemic in New York City, reopening in April 2021. Reliance Industries bought a majority stake in the Mandarin Oriental New York in January 2022 for $98 million.

As of October 2023, the new General Manager of the hotel is Marcel Thoma, replacing Susanne Hatje who had served in the role since 2013.

As of 2026, the hotel was rated as the top hotel in New York City and the top four in the country by US News & World Report.

=== Spa ===
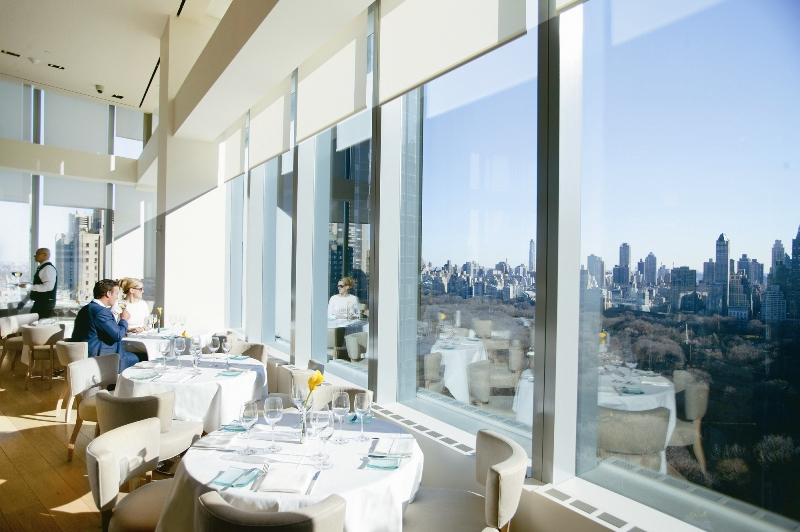
Asiate restaurant overlooking Central Park

The Spa is one of only two Forbes Five-Star spas in Manhattan (The other is the Peninsula New York Spa), is located on the 35th floor hotel and spans 14,500 sq ft (1,350 m^{2}). In 2017, Adam D. Tihany, Grant Achatz and Nick Kokonas jointly re-designed the Spa.

== Residences ==
The Residences at Mandarin Oriental, New York are a collection of 64 condominiums located directly above the hotel on floors 64–80. The individual units range from 1,000 sq ft (93 m^{2}) to full-floor apartments with over 8,000 sq ft (740 m^{2}) of private space. The full-service apartments have complete access to the hotel’s amenities & services – including the concierge, housekeeping, room service and fitness center.

== See also ==
- Mandarin Oriental Hotel Group
