= Mpumalanga Witchcraft Suppression Bill =

2007 South African draft legislation

In June 2007 the Office of the Premier of the Mpumalanga province in South Africa leaked a draft Mpumalanga Witchcraft Suppression Bill of 2007.

Unlike the Witchcraft Suppression Act of 1957 (which was directed against witch-hunting), the proposed Witchcraft Control Act would explicitly acknowledge the existence of witchcraft and criminalise it.

Drafting of the Bill was suspended the following year following opposition from traditional healers and Neopagans which also led to a review of existing national witchcraft legislation by the South African Law Reform Commission.

== Background ==
Despite the ongoing existence of the national Witchcraft Suppression Act of 1957 based on colonial witchcraft legislation, which criminalises the "pretence of witchcraft" and accusations of witchcraft, violent witch-hunts have persisted in rural areas of South Africa. Various legislative reforms have been proposed to try and address this complex problem.

The principal tenets of the ANC's 1994 National Health Plan with respect to traditional healers include the right of access to traditional practitioners as part of their cultural heritage and belief system and the control of traditional practitioners by a recognised and accepted body so that harmful practices can be eliminated and the profession promoted. This ultimately led to the national Traditional Health Practitioners Act of 2007 which the National Department of Health only started to implement in December 2011 under pressure from frustrated traditional healers.

In 1995 the Minister of Safety and Security of the Northern Province commissioned the Commission of Enquiry into Witchcraft Violence and Ritual Murder in the Northern Province of the Republic of South Africa chaired by Professor Victor Ralushai. The Committee proposed a new national Witchcraft Control Act including penalties for practising, or pretending to practise, witchcraft and also recommended new legislation to regulate traditional healers. Unlike the Witchcraft Suppression Act of 1957, the proposed Witchcraft Control Act would explicitly acknowledge the existence of witchcraft and criminalise it.

The Ralushai Commission defined a witch as follows in their report:

The English word witch is gender specific and confined to women only. The male equivalent is wizard. The Sesotho word moloi (pl. baloi) is derived from the verb loya, which means to bewitch and is attributed to those people who, through sheer malice, either consciously or subconsciously, employ magical means to inflict all manner of evil on their fellow human beings. They destroy property, bring disease or misfortune and cause death, often entirely without provocation to satisfy their inherent craving for evil doing. The Tsivenda word for witchcraft is vhuloi. The Nguni equivalent is ukuthakatha (verb) and umthakathi (noun). African terminology referring to witches or wizards is gender neutral (Minnaar et al 1998.)

— Report of the Ralushai Commission of Inquiry into Witchcraft Violence and Ritual Murder in the Northern Province

Testifying before a Truth and Reconciliation Commission amnesty hearing in July 1999 about his knowledge about witchcraft matters and other related issues, Professor Ralushai defined a witch as follows when requested to do so by practising attorney Patrick Ndou:

A witch is supposed to be a person who is endowed with powers of causing illness or ill luck or death to the person that he wants to destroy.

— Professor V N Ralushai, Truth and Reconciliation Commission Amnesty Hearing, Thohoyandou 12 July 1999

In 1998 the Commission for Gender Equality issued the Thohoyandou Declaration on Ending Witchcraft Violence, recommending urgent legislative reform to mitigate harmful witchcraft practices and violent witch hunts including new legislation to regulate the practices and conduct of traditional healers.

The draft Mpumalanga Witchcraft Suppression Bill of 2007 expanded on the Witchcraft Suppression Act of 1957, defining witchcraft as harmful magic and attempting to regulate the conduct of traditional healers in Mpumalanga.

== Mandate ==
The Mpumalanga Department of Local Government was mandated by the Provincial Executive Council to draft a Bill to address the high level of violence in the province caused by allegations of witchcraft.

The Bill was mentioned in the 2007/08 Budget speech for the Mpumalanga Provincial Government's Department of Local Government and Housing delivered on 31 May 2007:

I am sure that you are all aware that the province is drafting the Mpumalanga Witchcraft Suppression Bill. The purpose of the bill is to suppress Acts of witchcraft including naming and pointing of any body as a wizard or witch. To deal with the violence associated with allegations of witchcraft and deal with killings including ritual killing associated with witchcraft and empowering Traditional leaders to deal with witchcraft aspects.

— Honourable MEC C Mashego-Dlamini, Mpumalanga Local Government and Housing Prov Budget Vote, 2007/08

== Opposition to the Bill ==
In July 2007 members of organisations representing Neopagans and traditional healers met with officials of the Mpumalanga Provincial Government's Department of Local Government and Housing to discuss their concerns about the Bill from very different cultural viewpoints.

Pagans who self-identify as witches, albeit in a contemporary Western sense, objected to the unconstitutional suppression of their religious beliefs and practices and the negative stereotype of witchcraft in the Bill:

"Witchcraft" means the secret use of muti, zombies, spells, spirits, magic powders, water, mixtures, etc, by any person with the purpose of causing harm, damage, sickness to others or their property.

— Draft Mpumalanga Witchcraft Suppression Bill 2007

Traditional healers objected to an inyanga, a local term for a traditional healer, and muti, a local term for medicine, being associated with harmful practices and traditional healers effectively being labelled as witches, the witch term having strong negative connotations in an Afrocentric context:

"Inyanga" means a person who uses muti to cause harm, damage, suffering, bad luck, cure diseases, protect from evil spirits and uses mixtures shells, coins, bones, etc. to foretell the future of people, identify witches, perform spells for good and or evil purposes.

— Draft Mpumalanga Witchcraft Suppression Bill 2007

"Muti" means any mixture of herbs, water, wollen cufs, etc, used by wizards, igedla, inyanga, African Churches, Foreign traditional Healers, etc for the purposes of curing diseases, helping others who come to consult to them for whatever purposes and including causing harm to others or their properties.

— Draft Mpumalanga Witchcraft Suppression Bill 2007

== Suspension of the Bill ==
On 24 June 2008 the Mpumalanga Provincial Government issued a statement that they had suspended drafting of the Bill until further notice after consultation with different stakeholders.

== South African Law Reform Commission review of witchcraft legislation ==
The South African Pagan Rights Alliance first approached the South African Law Reform Commission regarding the constitutionality of the Witchcraft Suppression Act of 1957 in February 2007, prior to the leaking of the Mpumalanga Bill. The South African Law Reform Commission subsequently received further submissions from the South African Pagan Rights Alliance and the Traditional Healers Organization requesting the investigation of the constitutionality of both the Witchcraft Suppression Act of 1957 and the Mpumalanga Witchcraft Suppression Bill of 2007. On 23 March 2010 the Minister of Justice and Constitutional Development approved a South African Law Reform Commission project to review witchcraft legislation.

One of the SALRC's other new projects, the review of witchcraft legislation, will support the constitutional guarantee to freedom of religion, but will also serve to protect vulnerable groups. It is mostly women advanced in age that are persecuted as witches by communities holding traditional beliefs. These innocent victims are vulnerable to a double degree: as women and as older persons.

— South African Law Reform Commission Thirty Eighth Annual Report 2010/2011

In March 2012 the South African Law Reform Commission advised that Ms Jennifer Joni has been designated as researcher and Judge Dennis Davis has been designated as project leader for Project 135: Review of witchcraft legislation. Dr Theodore Petrus, who completed a doctoral thesis on witchcraft-related crime in 2009, was invited to become part of an advisory committee to assist in the review.

== See also ==
- Tagati
- Witch smeller
