= Spotted dog =

Spotted dog may refer to:

- The common name for Pulmonaria, a flowering plant
- An alternate name for Spotted dick, a type of English pudding
- Spotted Dog, Forest Gate, a London pub
