= List of acts of the Parliament of Scotland from 1563 =

This is a list of acts of the Parliament of Scotland for the year 1563.

It lists acts of Parliament of the old Parliament of Scotland, that was merged with the old Parliament of England to form the Parliament of Great Britain, by the Union with England Act 1707 (c. 7).

For other years, see list of acts of the Parliament of Scotland. For the period after 1707, see list of acts of the Parliament of Great Britain.

== 1563 ==
The 9th parliament of Mary.

| Short title, or popular name | Citation | Royal assent |
Long title
| Act of Oblivion 1563 (repealed) | 1563 c. 1 (Note: This is the citation in the Record Edition.); 1563 c. 67 (Note: This is the citation in the Duodecimal Edition.) | 4 June 1563 |
The act of oblivioun. The act of oblivion. (Repealed by Statute Law Revision (Scotland) Act 1906 (6 Edw. 7. c. 38))
| Exceptions to Act of Oblivion 1563 (repealed) | 1563 c. 2; 1563 c. 67 | 4 June 1563 |
Exceptiounis from the forsaid act of oblivioun. Exceptions from the aforesaid act of oblivion. (Repealed by Statute Law Revision (Scotland) Act 1906 (6 Edw. 7. c. 38))
| Salmon Act 1563 (repealed) | 1563 c. 3; 1563 c. 68 | 4 June 1563 |
Ratificatioun of the act of King James IV. (Note: (Act of James IV ?)) anent cruvis and fische dammis—with additioun. (Repealed by Statute Law Revision (Scotland) Act 1964 (c. 80))
| Gold and Silver Act 1563 (repealed) | 1563 c. 4; 1563 c. 69 | 4 June 1563 |
Ratificatioun of all actis maid of befoir anentis the carying and away taking of gold and silver furth of this realme—with additioun. (Repealed by Statute Law Revision (Scotland) Act 1906 (6 Edw. 7. c. 38))
| Coining Act 1563 (repealed) | 1563 c. 5; 1563 c. 70 | 4 June 1563 |
Ratificatioun of all actis maid of befoir twiching the hamebringing of fals cuinyie within this realme and anentis the makaris and forgearis of fals cuinyie—with additioun. (Repealed by Statute Law Revision (Scotland) Act 1906 (6 Edw. 7. c. 38))
| Food Act 1563 (repealed) | 1563 c. 6 — (Note: This act is not listed in the Duodecimal Edition.) | 4 June 1563 |
Ratificatioun of the act for repressing of derth of victuallis—with additioun. (Repealed by Statute Law Revision (Scotland) Act 1906 (6 Edw. 7. c. 38))
| Salt Act 1563 (repealed) | 1563 c. 7; 1563 c. 71 | 4 June 1563 |
Anent ane new maner of making of salt. (Repealed by Statute Law Revision (Scotland) Act 1906 (6 Edw. 7. c. 38))
| Manses and Glebes Act 1563 (repealed) | 1563 c. 8; 1563 c. 72 | 4 June 1563 |
Anent mansis and gleibis. (Repealed by Statute Law Revision (Scotland) Act 1964 (c. 80))
| Witchcraft Act 1563 (repealed) | 1563 c. 9; 1563 c. 73 | 4 June 1563 |
Anent the using of witchcraftis sorsarie and necromancie. (Repealed by Witchcraft Act 1735 (9 Geo. 2. c. 5))
| Adultery Act 1563 (repealed) | 1563 c. 10; 1563 c. 74 | 4 June 1563 |
Anentis notoure and manifest adulterie. (Repealed by Statute Law Revision (Scotland) Act 1906 (6 Edw. 7. c. 38))
| Armed Forces Act 1563 (repealed) | 1563 c. 11; 1563 c. 75 | 4 June 1563 |
Anentis the raising of bandis of men of weir. (Repealed by Statute Law Revision (Scotland) Act 1906 (6 Edw. 7. c. 38))
| Parish Churches Act 1563 (repealed) | 1563 c. 12; 1563 c. 76 | 4 June 1563 |
Anentis the uphalding and reparelling of paroche kirkis and kirk yairdis of the samin for buriall of the deid. (Repealed by Statute Law Revision (Scotland) Act 1906 (6 Edw. 7. c. 38))
| Tenants of Church Lands Act 1563 (repealed) | 1563 c. 14; 1563 c. 77 | 4 June 1563 |
Anent the lauchfull possessouris tennentis and occupyaris of kirk landis and the setting of kirk lands in few or lang takkis for thre yeris nixt to cum. (Repealed by Statute Law Revision (Scotland) Act 1906 (6 Edw. 7. c. 38))
| Measures and Weights Act 1563 (repealed) | 1563 c. 14 — | 4 June 1563 |
Anent mesouris and wechtis. (Repealed by Statute Law Revision (Scotland) Act 1906 (6 Edw. 7. c. 38))
| Game Act 1563 (repealed) | 1563 c. 15 — | 4 June 1563 |
Anent the schuting of deir and uther wylde beistis and wylde foulis. (Repealed by Statute Law Revision (Scotland) Act 1906 (6 Edw. 7. c. 38))
| Notaries (No. 1) Act 1563 (repealed) | 1563 c. 16; 1563 c. 78 | 4 June 1563 |
Dispensatioun with the actis maid of be foir anentis the admissioun of notaris. (Repealed by Statute Law Revision (Scotland) Act 1906 (6 Edw. 7. c. 38))
| Notaries Act 1563 (repealed) | 1563 c. 17; 1563 c. 79 | 4 June 1563 |
Anent the creatioun of notaris. (Repealed by Statute Law (Repeals) Act 1973 (c. 39))
| Saisines Act 1563 (repealed) | 1563 c. 18; 1563 c. 80 | 4 June 1563 |
Anent the geving of sesingis. (Repealed by Statute Law Revision (Scotland) Act 1906 (6 Edw. 7. c. 38))
| Resignations Act 1563 (repealed) | 1563 c. 19; 1563 c. 81 | 4 June 1563 |
Anent resignatiounis be vassallis of thair proprieteis in the superiouris handis ad perpetuam remanentiam. (Repealed by Statute Law Revision (Scotland) Act 1906 (6 Edw. 7. c. 38))
| Burghs Act 1563 (repealed) | 1563 c. 20; 1563 c. 82 | 4 June 1563 |
Anent the warning of burrowis to conventiounis to conclude upone peax or weir or for granting of general taxatiounis. (Repealed by Statute Law Revision (Scotland) Act 1906 (6 Edw. 7. c. 38))
| Burghs (No. 2) Act 1563 (repealed) | 1563 c. 21; 1563 c. 83 | 4 June 1563 |
For stancheing and suppressing of tumultis within burrowis. (Repealed by Statute Law Revision (Scotland) Act 1906 (6 Edw. 7. c. 38))
| Coals Act 1563 (repealed) | 1563 c. 22; 1563 c. 84 | 4 June 1563 |
Anent the transporting of coillis furth of the realme. (Repealed by Statute Law Revision (Scotland) Act 1906 (6 Edw. 7. c. 38))
| Flesh Act 1563 (repealed) | 1563 c. 23; 1563 c. 85 | 4 June 1563 |
That beif muttoun veill and lyke bestiall be brocht to mercatis with hyde skin and birne. (Repealed by Statute Law Revision (Scotland) Act 1906 (6 Edw. 7. c. 38))
| Burghs (No. 3) Act 1563 (repealed) | 1563 c. 24; 1563 c. 86 | 4 June 1563 |
Ratificatioun of actis statutis privilegeis and immuniteis grantit in favouris of the burrowis. (Repealed by Statute Law Revision (Scotland) Act 1906 (6 Edw. 7. c. 38))
| Letters of Marque Act 1563 (repealed) | 1563 c. 25 — | 4 June 1563 |
Anent the abusioun of the letters of marque grantit upone the king of Portingall. (Repealed by Statute Law Revision (Scotland) Act 1906 (6 Edw. 7. c. 38))
| St. Andrews Act 1563 (repealed) | 1563 c. 26 — | 4 June 1563 |
Anent ane commissioun to visie the collegeis of Sanctandros and utheris within this realme and to reporte to the nixt parliament. (Repealed by Statute Law Revision (Scotland) Act 1906 (6 Edw. 7. c. 38))
| Embassy to Denmark Act 1563 (repealed) | 1563 c. 27 — | 4 June 1563 |
Of an ambassadour to be sende to the king of Denmark. (Repealed by Statute Law Revision (Scotland) Act 1906 (6 Edw. 7. c. 38))

=== Sources ===
- Alexander, William (1841). "Acta Parliamentorum Mariæ Reginæ". An Abridgement of the Acts of the Parliaments of Scotland. Edinburgh: Adam and Charles Black. p. A20 – via Google Books.
- Alexander, William (1841). "Acta Parliamentorum Mariæ Reginæ". An Abridgement of the Acts of the Parliaments of Scotland. Edinburgh: Adam and Charles Black. p. A20 – via Google Books.
- Chronological Table of the Statutes. London: Her Majesty's Stationery Office. 1972. pp. 1333–1334 – via Google Books.
- "Index of Statutes: Mary I (1542-1567)". Records of the Parliaments of Scotland to 1707. University of St Andrews.

== See also ==
- List of legislation in the United Kingdom
- Records of the Parliaments of Scotland
