= SAPC =

SAPC may refer to:

- St. Andrews Presbyterian College, a former name of St. Andrews University in Laurinburg, North Carolina
- Social, Aid and Pleasure Clubs, organizers of the Second line parades in New Orleans, Louisiana
- Suzuki Advanced Power Control, an electronic power valve and ignition timing control on the Suzuki RGV250 motorcycle
- South African Pagan Council, a South African neopagan organization
- Semi-armor-piercing, capped, a type of armor-piercing shell
