= Woodgrange Baptist Church =

Church in London, England

Coordinates: 51.54698°N 0.02837°E

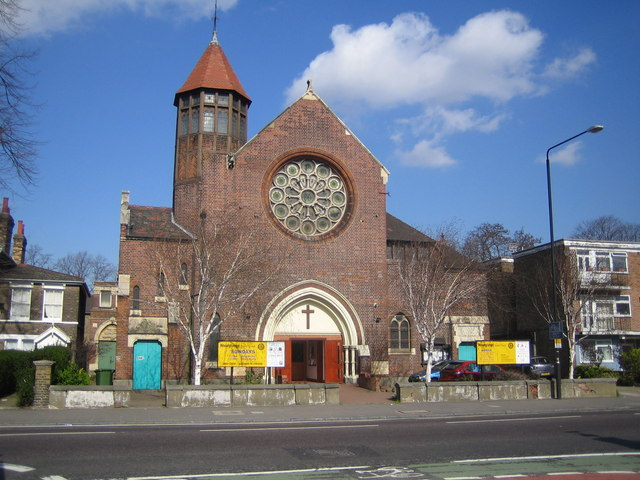
Woodgrange Baptist Church

Woodgrange Baptist Church is a Baptist church on the Romford Road in Forest Gate, east London. It was built in 1882, with a hall added in 1899. It was damaged during the London Blitz but was repaired.
