= Margaret Harkett =

English woman executed for witchcraft

Margaret Harkett (d. 19 February 1585 at Tyburn) was an English woman executed for witchcraft.

She was a sixty-year-old widow from Stanmore at the time she was arrested. She was accused of having bewitched two of her neighbors to death. She was given a death sentence.

She was executed by hanging at Tyburn. She was the first person executed for Witchcraft in the city of London after the introduction of the Witchcraft Act of 1563.

Her case was publicized in the pamphlet The Several Facts of Witchcraft approved and laid to the charge of Margaret Harkett (1585).

== See also ==
- Anne Kerke
