= Satanic panic (South Africa) =

Satanic panic in South Africa

The Satanic panic is a moral panic about alleged widespread Satanic ritual abuse which originated around the 1980s in the United States, peaking in the early 1990s, before waning as a result of the scepticism of academics and law enforcement agencies who ultimately debunked the claims. The phenomenon spread from the United States to other countries, including South Africa, where it is still evident periodically. South Africa was particularly associated with the Satanic panic because of the creation of the Occult Related Crimes Unit in 1992, described as the "world's only 'ritual murder' task force". According to anthropologist Annika Teppo, this was linked with powerful conservative Christian forces within the then-dominant white community in the last years of apartheid. Christian belief is a prerequisite to serve in the unit. The concern with the alleged presence of Satanism and occult practices has continued into the post-apartheid era.

== The local context ==
The long-term focus in a South African context has not been on claims of child abuse by Satanic cults and the psychiatric community has not played a significant role, as was the case in other countries. The local phenomenon is characterised by Christian evangelism and the scapegoating of Satanism for crime and societal problems. In his 1997 PhD thesis, psychologist Gavin Ivey attributes the local phenomenon to an increase in Christian fundamentalism coupled with a perceived Satanic threat in the social context of the contemporary occult revival:

... the current cultural paranoia concerning the 'satanic epidemic' is directly attributable to the extreme dualistic theology of the burgeoning evangelical Christian movements, which simultaneously promotes persecutory anxiety in the Christian faithful, and spurs would-be Luciferian rebels to genuine satanic practices.

— Gavin Ivey, The psychology of Satanic cult involvement: An archetypal object relations perspective (1997)

Ivey states "All monotheistic religions are forced to account for the presence of evil in a world where everything is created by God, who in theory should be able to vanquish all forms of evil but seems incapable to do so." He compares the importance of Satan in the only two contemporary major religions with a personified principle of evil in opposition to a single omnipotent deity who is unambiguously good, namely Satan in Christianity, whose identity evolved in the New Testament, and Satan in Islam. He notes the greater significance of Satan in Christianity, as Satan emerged as a less threatening figure in Islam and "Because it embraces a fundamental dualism, the Christian spiritual world is seen as a battleground between God and the personification of evil, the Devil." However, members of the relatively small Muslim community in South Africa have also been outspoken about the alleged dangers of Satanism.

In her 2012 MA thesis, Danielle Dunbar argues that while influenced by the international Satanism scare, past periods of Satanic panic in South Africa reflected localised periods of political upheaval and social anxiety. While in the past Dunbar and other academics have associated the South African phenomenon with the white population group in particular, some more specifically with Calvinist Afrikaners, the racial divide is disappearing. According to American sociologist Jeffrey Victor,

Satanic cult stories arise as a response to widespread socioeconomic stresses, particularly those affecting parenting and family relationships. These social stresses are products of the rapid social change and social disorganization that began during the 1960s, and that caused a deep cultural crisis of values and authority. The satanic cult legend says, in symbolic form, that our moral values are threatened by evil forces beyond our control, and that we have lost faith in our authorities to deal with the threat.

With reference to this quote, academic Nicky Falkof states in a South African context "alongside this, the figure of the Satanist provides an object for the displacement of anxiety and the concurrent cohesion of nationalistic sentiment."

Apart from religious groups, the media and the government have aggravated the local phenomenon. In 2007 Afrikaans-language newspaper Rapport dismissed journalist Deon Maas, who had advocated religious tolerance in his new column, to protect its commercial interests. According to Nicky Falkof, the English and Afrikaans media have not differed materially in their treatment of the subject: "The paranoia, sensationalism or occasional scepticism with which stories were reported generally had more to do with the class or locality of the audience than with their language group." The mainstream media in general persists in sensationalistic reporting regarding Satanism and the occult, especially regarding criminal cases with any suggestion of Satanic involvement.

The phenomenon is also evident in South Africa's neighbouring countries. In March 2013, Zimbabwe's national police spokesperson Charity Charamba said media reports about Satanic incidents were unfounded and were causing unnecessary panic.

== The role of the government ==
The Satanic Bible authored by Anton LaVey and published in the United States in 1969, which contains the main principles of atheistic LaVeyan Satanism, was banned during apartheid in South Africa from 1973 to 1993 for moral reasons. In 1974 South Africa's then Minister of Justice, Jimmy Kruger, reported widespread media coverage of a vast secret network of Satanists in the country was based on books published on the subject and not actual Satanic events. The government also disputed claims of widespread Satanism in a 1978 Dutch Reformed Church report. However, elements within the South African government continue to play a role in propagating the panic despite the constitutional right to religious freedom in post-apartheid South Africa.

=== SAPS Occult Related Crimes Unit ===
The SAPS Occult Related Crimes Unit was established in 1992 during the final years of apartheid by born-again Christian Kobus Jonker, prompted by former Minister of Law and Order Adriaan Vlok. Jonker joined the SAP in 1969 and was previously head of the Port Elizabeth Murder and Robbery Unit. During his policing career he earned the nicknames "Donker Jonker", "The Hound of God" and "God's Detective". (Note: The South African Police (SAP) was renamed the South African Police Service (SAPS) in post-apartheid South Africa.) (Note: The Afrikaans word donker means "dark".)

As late as 2006 SAPS defined occult-related crime on the Occult Related page of their website as follows:

Occult-related crime means any human conduct that constitutes any legally recognized crime, the modus operandi of which relates to or emanates primarily from any belief or seeming belief in the occult, witchcraft, satanism, mysticism, magic, esotericism and the like. Included in the scope of occult-related crime are ritual muti/medicine murders, witch purging, witchcraft-related violence and sect-related practices that pose a threat to the safety and security of the Republic of South Africa and/or its inhabitants.

— SAPS, Objectives of the Investigation and Prevention of Occult-Related Crime by the General Detectives

According to Ivey, the special crime unit was formed "to investigate and prosecute Satanic crime". Theodore Petrus, Senior Lecturer in Anthropology at Nelson Mandela Metropolitan University, states the main focus of the unit is Satanism in his 2009 doctoral thesis on crime related to "witchcraft" in a traditional African context. SAPS has been criticised for neglecting the more serious criminal problems of witch-hunts and medicine murders. (Note: The colonial term witchcraft used by Petrus in a traditional African context has strong negative connotations and relates to a belief in harmful magic.) Danielle Dunbar refers to the SAPS definition of occult-related crime in her 2012 MA thesis:

Under this broad purview of the 'occult', the specialised Occult Related Crimes Unit predominantly targeted the threat of Satanism in South Africa. Indeed, the conceptualisation of the world's only 'ritual murder' task force was fostered in the last embers of apartheid South Africa during a white, satanic panic.

— Danielle Dunbar, The Devil's Children: Volk, Devils and Moral Panics in White South Africa, 1976–1993 (2012)

Ivey notes that everything occult is considered evil from a fundamentalist Christian perspective, and "the term Satanism is commonly understood in Christian societies to include a wide range of unconventional or occult beliefs and activities". The SAPS website also listed 41 "warning signs of possible destructive occult-related discourse", including "gender confusion", playing fantasy games which lack boundaries, an interest in computers, an excessive interest in horror movies and heavy metal music, depression and various stereotypical elements of Gothic fashion. Dale Wallace, Honorary Senior Lecturer in Religion Studies at the University of KwaZulu-Natal, comments on this thinking in her 2006 doctoral thesis:

The presence of this hysterical rhetoric in a modern police service in South Africa, even post-1994, mirrors similar occurrences in Britain and the USA and in various European countries in the 1980s. A religious construction of crime pervaded law enforcement agencies, giving rise to the title of Cult Cops to those who cloaked criminal activity with fundamentalist Christian interpretation. From the late 1990s, what had become known of as the Satanic Panic, attracted the attention of scholars (Victor 1993; Hjelm 2000; Pike 2001), and a more critical appraisal from within police departments themselves, leading to a universal debunking of the phenomenon.

— Dale Wallace, The Construction and Articulation of a Pagan Identity in South Africa (2006)

Anthropologist Annika Teppo writes about the unit and a research informant's experience with the unit in an academic publication published in 2009:

South African Whites are well known for their religious conservatism, tending towards right-wing fundamentalism, which leaves little room for other faiths (Chidester 1992: 216). The Calvinist Afrikaner-run Dutch Reformed Church (DRC), which helped to justify the racial segregation of apartheid, is a stronghold of this conservatism. The DRC's pervasive influence means that the devil and devil-worshippers are still generally feared—to the extent that South Africa is still the only country in the world that has an Occult-Related Crime Unit (OCRU) in their police force. While my informants report good relations with the police at present, many of them had experienced problems with them earlier when the difference between neopagan practices and devil worship had not yet become clear to the authorities. One of my informants had been in considerable trouble during his high school years when he, as 'a reader of strange books and all of fifteen', was suspected of occult activities. In the ensuing police hearings, these accusations were proven to be a teenage prank. However, the allegations of dark, diabolic practices in a privileged beachfront suburb caused a media frenzy, and by the time the misunderstanding was corrected, my informant had earned a reputation as the 'Camps Bay Satanist'.

— Annika Teppo, My House is Protected by a Dragon: White South Africans, Magic and Sacred Spaces in Post-Apartheid Cape Town (2009)

While SAPS removed the Occult Related page from their website in 2006 after the South African Pagan Rights Alliance requested the removal of discriminatory material, its content is still available via the official SAPS community magazine SERVAMUS. An article titled Breaking the Circle in a SERVAMUS Special Community Edition Drugs and Occult-Related Crime: The Facts, The Answers published in 2000 lists "Animosity towards Christianity, the church and Jesus Christ" as one of many warning signs of Satanic involvement. This SERVAMUS Special Community Edition was still being sold in May 2013. In an article written by Jonker and published in SERVAMUS, he says there are three Satanic movements (Brotherhood of Ram, Order of Darkness and Sons of Satan) and four types of Satanist (generational Satanists, organised Satanists i.e. LaVeyan Satanists, self-styled Satanists and dabblers) in South Africa. He also authored and co-authored several books on Satanism during his policing career which Dunbar describes as alarmist anti-Satanist literature, including Youth and Satanism Exposed (1990), Satanism Exposed (1992) and Satanism in South Africa (2000). Wallace notes the conflation of Paganism and Satanism in this literature, despite disclaimers to the contrary, and Jonker's failure "to distinguish between actual Satanic activity and purely criminal acts" in the media:

Disclaimers in Els and Jonker's book and in the media, that Paganism and Wicca are not Satanism, are overridden in these texts and in the labeling of any and all forms of occultism as deviant, through the singular lens of evangelical Pentecostal Christianity. Pagan identities are unavoidably conflated with Satanism in this manner.

— Dale Wallace, The Construction and Articulation of a Pagan Identity in South Africa (2006)

Christianity is a prerequisite to serve in the unit. An article titled Warriors against Evil, first published in the November 1998 issue of SERVAMUS and later published in the 2000 SERVAMUS Special Community Edition, states:

SAPS members who want to serve in this Unit must acknowledge the supernatural world. They must strongly believe in Jesus Christ, because Satanism's main enemy is Jesus Christ. It is not just a job, it's a lifelong mission, involving the body, soul and spirit.

The article also lists "Deliverance through pastoral guidance" within the scope of the unit. Jonker elaborated on this in an interview with Sarah Duguid: "The ordinary guy cannot investigate occult crimes. There are things you see and experiences you have as a result of the supernatural. You must be strong in faith to be in the occult unit." He believes Satan is a literal being. In the April 1997 issue of SERVAMUS, he writes "I believe the devil exists because I have seen things happen. I have seen a woman being attacked right in my presence by a demonic being".

Some senior SAPS officers have attempted to have the unit disbanded. An internal SAPS document dated October 1998 expressed concern about the policing of religious activities due to "constitutional restraints", and Jonker's public addresses on the dangers of Satanism to schoolchildren, community policing forums and church seminars at the state's expense were curtailed.

Jonker left the police force after suffering a heart attack in 2000 and subsequently practised as a pastoral counsellor. He has been a director of the Act-Up Support Christian prayer ministry since 2002 and has worked as a consultant for the SAPS Detective Academy in Hammanskraal since his retirement. Other former members of the unit became involved in Christian deliverance ministry and therapy, including former Eastern Cape coordinator of the unit James Lottering (Warfare Ministries in Port Elizabeth) and former Free State coordinator of the unit Johan de Beer (Auksano Trauma Therapy Centre in Bloemfontein). Lottering left SAPS at the end of 1997. De Beer founded Auksano in 1998 while working for SAPS and resigned from SAPS in 2002. FH Havinga, a specialist reservist for the unit, is also a Christian pastoral counsellor and founder of the ASERAC centre for trauma victims of drug, occult, alcohol and sexual abuse in Kempton Park.

Attie Lamprecht was appointed head of the unit in 2000. He is also a registered counsellor and as late as 2010 was listed as a member of Act-Up Support's advisory board. Lamprecht has stated that, unlike Satanism in other countries which is predominantly about self-worship, "Satanism in South Africa is characteristically against Jesus Christ. Therefore, it is against all that is good." He believes Satanism is "a belief system that leads to crime", stating "It starts with white magic. It goes to gateway religious systems and then to destructive religions." Official statements that the unit had been disbanded were dismissed by Lamprecht, who in 2006 said the unit had been absorbed into other units, and later said it had been removed from the public eye and renamed the SAPS Harmful Religious Practices Unit.

Psychologist Gavin Ivey said the unit is "a waste of taxpayers' money", and psychoanalyst Véronique Faure states:

The only way the old guard can justify their place within the new SAPS is by mobilising around Christian values. They hope to convince both the public and the government of the validity of their sacred mission and thereby gather funding for further investigations and campaigns of moral education.

In November 2010 a team of 30 specialists was trained for the unit, and in 2012 two detectives per province received specialised training. Jonker was involved in part of this training. In 2012 three Eastern Cape detectives were trained by Jonker for a new provincial occult task team. As a result of this new investment being publicised in the media, DA MP and Shadow Minister of Police Dianne Kohler Barnard asked the Minister of Police Nathi Mthethwa for the number of occult-related crimes in the last financial year and was told such information is not readily available.

Based on an internal SAPS memorandum dated August 2012, it appears the SAPS definition of occult-related crime has been simplified to "crime that relates to or emanates primarily from an ostensible belief in the supernatural that formed a driving force in the forming, planning and execution of a crime". However, the scope of occult-related "crime" that may be investigated has been expanded to include:

- Witchcraft-related offences, including black magic, witch finding and witch purging
- Traditional healers involved in criminal activities rooted in the occult
- Curses intended to cause harm
- The practice of voodoo intended to cause harm
- Vampirism and joint infringement of the Human Tissues Act
- Harmful cult behaviour that infringes on the rights of members of the movement
- Spiritual intimidation, including astral coercion
- Vandalism/graffiti leaving evidence that the motive is occult related
- Suicide leaving evidence of occult involvement
- Ritualistic abuse in a cult setting
- Allegations of rape by a tokoloshe spirit
- Animal mutilation and sacrifice leaving evidence of occult involvement
- Murder/human sacrifice leaving evidence of occult involvement
- Interpretation of occult "signatures" and paraphernalia at a crime scene
- Poltergeist phenomena (unexplained activities by paranormal disruptive entities)

— SAPS, Investigation of Harmful Occult-related Crimes: Investigation Support Capacity (2012)

The South African Pagan Rights Alliance objected to the apparent revival of the unit on the grounds of religiously motivated prejudice demonstrated towards minority religions by Christian evangelists involved in the initiative, and the inappropriate allocation of police resources to the investigation of alleged paranormal phenomena which cannot be proven in court. Theodore Petrus expressed some reservations about the establishment of a new SAPS occult task team, cautioning that a clear distinction should be made between Satanism and "African witchcraft" beliefs and occult-related crimes should be clearly defined in legislation to avoid infringing on religious freedoms.

=== Department of Basic education ===
An example school code of conduct published by the national Department of Education in 2008 explicitly associates Satanism with criminal activity, (Note: The Department of Education was divided into the Department of Basic Education and the Department of Higher Education and Training in 2009.) and many public schools openly discriminate against practitioners of Satanism and the occult, which are generally undefined. Education about what Satanism actually entails has met with resistance from parents, and schoolchildren have been stigmatized and isolated as a result of accusations of Satanism.

On 1 March 2013, Gauteng schoolgirl Keamogetswe Sefularo was allegedly fatally stabbed by another girl from the same school. Although before dying Sefularo allegedly told her mother her attacker said they were attacking her because "she hung out with Satanists", the incident was labelled "Satanic" in the media. On 5 March 2013, Gauteng MEC for Education Barbara Creecy announced a "gang" of ten other learners at the school, including two present at the incident, had been suspended from school pending investigations into the incident. Gauteng Department of Education (GDE) spokesperson Charles Phahlane said their suspension related to alleged involvement in "harmful religious practices", which Creecy said department officials were told might have led to the incident. South African Council of Churches chairperson Mautji Pataki commented "We are gravely concerned that evil spirits are driving innocent children to commit horrendous crimes."

According to a GDE media release dated 7 March 2013, a partnership with faith-based organizations (FBOs) comprising representatives of mainstream Abrahamic religions is "assisting the department to support schools in addressing issues of learning and teaching, learner discipline, and spiritual disturbances at schools". On 18 March 2013, Creecy publicly signed a memorandum of understanding with the FBOs. On the same day, the department published an official statement online about an "anti-Satanism strategy" for schools developed by the FBOs to address "harmful religious practices" related to the occult and Satanism. However, the department has no statistics on such incidents, Creecy said the situation is not at crisis level, and the department denied there was an increase in Satanic incidents among schoolchildren in the province.

Creecy said a handbook had been compiled to help teachers and parents deal with Satanism which included signs to look out for and guidance in the event that a child is suspected of being involved in the occult. Atheists and Pagans objected on constitutional grounds. Following the receipt of several complaints by the South African Human Rights Commission, the GDE advised there would no longer be a handbook for teachers and parents, only guidelines for department officials. Ironically, in March 2011 Creecy herself was labelled a "Satanist" in a public slur by Moss Senye, a school principal and SADTU's Gauteng chairperson. Although the mainstream media in general sensationalised the Satanism aspect of these developments, one article by Elaine Swanepoel in The Citizen newspaper presented sceptical views of experts and religious leaders including Anglican bishops Peter Lee and Martin Breytenbach that dysfunctional behaviour and school violence could also be attributed to emotional and psychological problems, instability at home and superstition.

Also in March 2013, KwaZulu-Natal MEC for Education Senzo Mchunu said an increase in Satanism and incidents of "possession" in KwaZulu-Natal schools were a cause for concern for the KwaZulu-Natal Department of Education. He invited churches and others to help the department address the issue. In contrast to the GDE partnership with FBOs, following reports of learners being involved in Satanism in Western Cape schools in 2012, Western Cape Education Department spokesperson Paddy Attwell said school psychologists and social workers would be provided to support schools on request. Spokesperson for the national Department of Basic Education Hope Mokgatlhe said the department did not have a firm policy to deal with the issue, and said the GDE strategy could be implemented in other provinces at the discretion of the individual provinces.

In October 2013, the Minister of Basic Education Angie Motshekga told residents of Mpumalanga to pray for their children to be "delivered from evil spirits" in response to a parent's statement about Satanism in the community.

=== Human Sciences Research Council ===
The Human Sciences Research Council (HSRC) statutory body released its report on what it describes as "the first comprehensive assessment of human trafficking in South Africa" in March 2010. While the HSRC report acknowledges an urgent need for further research on ritual sacrifice, it states as fact "the trafficking of people, sometimes children, for ritual sacrifice by satanic cults" based solely on interviews with informants described as "former members of satanic cults in South Africa" which revealed "a belief that satanic cults operate within all areas of South Africa". A critical review of the HSRC report published by the Institute for Security Studies says it suffers from "lack of evidence and methodological integrity" and "fuels sensationalism".

=== Parliament of South Africa ===
In April 2013, the Minister for Women, Children and People with Disabilities Lulu Xingwana publicly cited Satanism as a contributing factor to gender-based violence in South Africa in a submission to Parliament, despite more obvious critical factors and a lack of supporting evidence.

== Pseudo-Satanism ==
The pattern of suppressing objective information about Satanism while spreading anti-Satanist propaganda has contributed to the social phenomenon of pseudo-Satanism in South Africa. Propagation of the Christian mythical version of Satanism serves to provide a role for rebellious teenagers and mentally confused individuals to act out in a self-fulfilling prophecy. In his 1997 PhD thesis, Gavin Ivey addresses the phenomenon of pseudo-Satanism informed by cultural paranoia:

The first group hardly justifies the satanic label, and these individuals are referred to in the literature as "dabblers" (Greaves, 1992; Tate, 1991). They are generally white adolescents who, sensitive to the cultural paranoia surrounding Satanism, rebel against authority figures by professing loose allegiance to diluted satanic ideology, and engage in behaviour that conservative authorities misconstrue as satanic: participating in the Heavy Metal music subculture, wearing black clothing, drawing satanic icons, participating in fantasy and occult games, etc. Their naive understanding of Satanism, the lack of organised expression, and the general anti-establishment motive of gaining identity by rebelling against traditional norms, set this group apart from Satanism proper. Because of its social visibility, this group is largely responsible for the public misperception that the incidence of Satanism has reached epidemic proportions.

— Gavin Ivey, The psychology of Satanic cult involvement (1997)

Nicky Falkof notes that paranoid lists of warning signs of Satanism, such as those published by SAPS and contained in the Gauteng Education Department handbook, operate as a self-fulfilling prophecy:

The frequent lists of warning signs of susceptibility to or involvement in Satanism included a litany of adolescent signifiers, from wearing black to feeling strong emotion: one Satan-hunter, in a self-published pamphlet, listed "restlessness, fear, loneliness, anxiety, pride, depression, jealousy" as signs for parents to watch out for (van Zijl 1988:15). Every adolescent, but most of all those who failed to display the heavily prescribed normativity attached to South African youth, was always-already marked with the signs of satanic involvement. This phobic response to unruly youth is the diametric opposite of the coherence inspired by the creation of a unifying folk enemy, and operates as something of a self-fulfilling prophecy: public demonisation of youth behaviour engenders the spread of rebellious social practices that take much of their colour from media reports about the moral panic.

— Nicky Falkof, Apartheid's Demons: Satanism and Moral Panic in South Africa (2010)

American folklorist Bill Ellis associates this phenomenon with legend tripping youths:

We can infer that such folk groups—not "cults"—are responsible for most of what police "experts" claim is evidence of "satanism." Further, we may infer that as adults become hypersensitive to certain activities as "satanic," many such adolescent groups will adopt (or pretend to adopt) these acts out of protest.

— Bill Ellis, Legend Trips and Satanism: Adolescents' Ostensive Traditions as "Cult" Activity (1991)

== Satanic cases ==
According to the US State Department's International Religious Freedom Report 2006 for South Africa, there were no reports of Satanic killings as such cases are investigated and prosecuted as homicide. However, a few high-profile cases have been publicly linked to Satanism. In some of these cases, Satanism, demonic possession and/or occult aspects have been raised as a legal defence or a mitigating factor in sentencing. In 2008 head of the SAPS investigative psychology unit Gerard Labuschagne cautioned against emphasising so-called forces of evil in criminal cases:

Whenever there is a murder, people jump to conclusions, and always God or Satan told the killers to do it ... These notions shouldn't be taken seriously because it is straightforward: someone, of their own free will, can kill another person.

In 2012 Dale Wallace said many incidents were labelled "Satanic" to cover up bullying, family problems and psychological problems. Kobus Jonker is often quoted in the media and called as an expert witness regarding such cases. Véronique Faure states:

... although despised by the academic community, Jonker enjoys the status of an expert in occult-related matters, and is highly respected and feared by those who need his services. His marketing strategy is so efficient that, scientific publications excepted, his name appears everywhere there is a reference to Satanism in South Africa.

Following sensationalistic media reports about a number of fatal incidents involving children which were linked to Satanism based on hearsay, a member of the Church of Satan condemned so-called Satanic killings in an interview aired on SABC News in May 2013. He said children younger than 18 are not welcome in the church and Satanic rituals are misinterpreted by many people claiming to be Satanists. An article by Khuthala Nandipha in the Mail & Guardian newspaper highlighted community ignorance about Satanism and likely contributory factors including social decay and inequality and the abuse of alcohol and drugs such as nyaope.

=== Gert van Rooyen ===
Gert van Rooyen and his lover Joey Haarhoff were suspected by the South African Police of abducting and murdering several young girls who disappeared between 1988 and 1990. In January 1990, Van Rooyen killed Haarhoff and committed suicide during a police chase. In November 1991, Van Rooyen's son Flippie van Rooyen was convicted of murdering a 15-year-old Zimbabwean girl during his military service. His death sentence was commuted to life imprisonment in 1993. In 1997 he said the missing girls were killed during Satanic rituals and were the victims of international child pornography rings, but no evidence of this was ever found. In 2001 he was sentenced to an additional six years' imprisonment for perjury for false statements he made about the missing girls. He was paroled in 2008. The whereabouts of the missing girls are still unknown.

=== Death of Dawn Orso ===
In September 1992 Dawn Orso was murdered in her home in the Rugby suburb of Cape Town. In March 1994 her daughter Angelique Orso and Angelique's boyfriend Lawrence van Blerk were convicted of the murder. The judge rejected their defence that they were acting involuntarily under the influence of demons. Angelique Orso received an 11-year prison sentence and van Blerk received an 8-year prison sentence.

=== Abduction of Alison Botha ===
In December 1994 Alison Botha was abducted, raped, stabbed and disembowelled by Frans du Toit and Theuns Kruger in Port Elizabeth. She miraculously survived the attack. Her attackers were described as "Satanists" in the media. Du Toit said he was possessed by a demon and underwent an "exorcism" in June 1995 which was publicised. Kobus Jonker testified he did not believe he was possessed by a demon. Du Toit and Kruger both received life sentences in August 1995. However, they were paroled on July 4, 2023. Satanism was not considered a mitigating factor in their sentencing. A book was written about Botha's survival by Marianne Thamm, I Have Life, which has been made into a film, Alison. In February 2025, Minister of Correctional Services Pieter Groenewald cancelled the parole of both Du Toit and Kruger and they were reincarcerated.

=== Maurice Smith ===
In September 1997 Maurice Smith and two schoolboy accomplices murdered and decapitated a homeless man in East London. The schoolboys testified as state witnesses. Smith said he was a Satanic high priest and said he killed the man to obtain a human skull to give him power. He received a 30-year prison sentence in January 1998. Satanism was not considered a mitigating factor in his sentencing. Kobus Jonker said this murder gave SAPS their first concrete evidence of human sacrifice.

=== Death of Charles Jacobs ===
On 31 October 2005, Charles Jacobs was killed in a Paarl LDS church where he worked as custodian. The scene was staged as a crucifixion and the word "Satun" [sic] was written on the floor in blood. Although police spokespersons said it was probably a "botched burglary" not an occult murder, the killing was described as "Satanic" and "occult-style" in the media. Four suspects were arrested and charged with murder and robbery with aggravating circumstances but the state failed to make their case. One of the four suspects was convicted of theft while another was convicted of receiving stolen property. Both men received suspended sentences.

=== Lotter case ===
In July 2008 Johannes Petrus Lotter and his wife Maria Magdalena Lotter were murdered in their home in the Westville suburb of Durban. Their daughter Nicolette, their son Hardus and Nicolette's boyfriend Mathew Naidoo were arrested shortly afterwards. In 2009 Christelle Lotter, sister to Hardus and Nicolette, dismissed claims that her siblings were influenced by Satanism. The murder trial, which commenced in October 2011, involved references to God, the Bible, Satanism, a tokoloshe, demons and witchcraft. In March 2012 Nicolette, Hardus and Naidoo were convicted of the murder. The uncle of the Lotter siblings, Reverend Willem Lotter of the Dutch Reformed Church, gave evidence in mitigation of sentence during which he urged them to take responsibility for their actions. Nicolette received two 12-year concurrent prison sentences and Hardus received two 10-year concurrent prison sentences. The judge said people should not be allowed to escape liability as a result of a belief in witchcraft and the occult. Naidoo, whom the siblings said they believed to be the "third son of God" and was found to be the mastermind by the judge, received two life sentences.

=== Morne Harmse ===
In August 2008 18-year-old Morne Harmse went on a violent rampage at his Krugersdorp school, killing fellow pupil Jacques Pretorius and injuring several others with a katana. During the attack he wore a mask resembling one worn by the lead singer of heavy metal band Slipknot. It was reported he told bystanders Satan told him to do it. His parents told the press he was a victim of school bullying and said it seemed he had experimented with Satanism. Community speculation about a Satanic motive was dismissed as simplistic by SAPS psychologist Gerard Labuschagne. During early court proceedings it transpired that Harmse had told a doctor a ghost had told him to become a Satanist. In his subsequent admission of guilt of murder and attempted murder he said he did it to make an impression. Kobus Jonker later testified as expert witness the evidence did not suggest he was a Satanist. Harmse received a 20-year prison sentence in September 2009.

=== Death of Michael van Eck ===
In April 2011 Michael van Eck was murdered in a Welkom graveyard by Chane van Heerden and Maartens van der Merwe. The murder was labelled "Satanic" by Danie Krügel, a former police officer and founding member of Auksano. Soon after the murder Welkom police spokesperson Stephen Thakeng, who is also an ordained Christian minister, said gruesome discoveries on the couple's property confirmed the police's suspicion about their involvement in Satanism. People close to the couple said they were Christian and denied any link to Satanism. The Satanism link was dismissed by expert witnesses and van Heerden herself during her trial. SAPS psychologist Gerard Labuschagne testified aspects of the murder indicated it was a "psychologically motivated crime". In November 2011 van Heerden was declared a dangerous criminal and received a minimum prison sentence of 20 years, to be re-evaluated after 20 years. Van der Merwe received a life sentence in November 2012.

=== Death of Kirsty Theologo ===
In October 2011 18-year-old Kirsty Theologo died and a 14-year-old girl was seriously injured after being doused with petrol and set on fire in the Linmeyer southern suburb of Johannesburg. The incident was described as a "Satanic ritual" in the media. Six people aged 16 to 23 were charged with murder and attempted murder. In March 2012 18-year-old Lester Moody, the son of a Christian pastor, and 18-year-old Jeremy King entered into a plea bargain with the state. Each received a 17-year prison sentence, five years of which was suspended. In April 2013 Moody testified in the trial of the four others accused that the ritual, which he described as a "sacrifice" after reading it described that way in magazines, was based on a Bible verse with "Satanic elements" added later. The court also heard from a defence attorney that Theologo's friends were curious about Satanism but did not really understand what it entailed. In November 2013 Lindon Wagner and Robin Harwood were convicted of assault, murder and attempted murder. In February 2014 Wagner was sentenced to life imprisonment for Theologo's murder plus 18 years' imprisonment for attempted murder, while Harwood was sentenced to 20 years' imprisonment for Theologo's murder.

=== Deaths linked to Overcomers Through Christ ministry ===
Between July 2012 and October 2012, two women and a male pastor with links to the Overcomers Through Christ (OTC) teaching ministry, as well as a neighbour of one of the women, were found stabbed to death in Gauteng. Friends of the victims and the media speculated the deaths were linked to Satanism. It was reported one of the women killed, Natacha Burger, was an OTC trainer who converted Satanists to Christianity and worked with former Satanists. In December 2017 six members of Overcomers Through Christ were arrested for the four murders which were among a total of 11 murders believed to have been committed by the group. The killings are believed to have stemmed from a factional split in the OTC membership.

=== Death of Kyle Mudaly ===
In September 2012 16-year-old Kyle Mudaly from the Reservoir Hills suburb of Durban committed suicide in his bedroom. A black hexagram was found on his bedroom wall. Speculation that the suicide was linked to a "Satanic cult" was dismissed by his family and friends, who said he was a practising Christian.

=== Death of Keamogetswe Sefularo ===
In March 2013 14-year-old Keamogetswe Sefularo from Lukhanyo Secondary School in the Mohlakeng township in Randfontein was allegedly fatally stabbed on her way home from school by a 15-year-old girl from the same school who was arrested immediately and charged with murder. Before dying Sefularo allegedly told her mother her attacker and two others present "interrogated her about an incident where she apparently called them goths" and said they were attacking her because "she hung out with Satanists". Other family members alleged the attackers had declared they were Satanists and the stabbing incident and attackers were labelled "Satanic" in the media. Police said there is no evidence of a Satanic group or occult-related crime in the area. Journalists were informed the case would be heard in camera. In October 2013 the teenage defendant confessed to the murder in court and received a prison sentence of 10 years, including a two-year suspended sentence. She said she committed the murder to be promoted within a cult after Sefularo had decided to leave the cult, and that she was attracted to the cult by the prospect of financial gain.

== Fatal exorcisms ==
There have also been several reported cases of fatal "exorcisms" of children where the killers believed the victims were possessed by demons.

- In November 2011 a priest and five adult congregation members of the African Gospel Church in Humansdorp in the Eastern Cape were arrested for killing Mihlali Mazantsi, a seven-year-old girl with epilepsy, during an exorcism ritual.
- In March 2012 five relatives were arrested for the killing of Sinethemba Dlamini, a teenage girl from Umlazi in KwaZulu-Natal, during another exorcism. According to a police source, the girl was accused of being possessed by a demon after she had become withdrawn.

== Academic views ==
Véronique Faure states "Satanism, a recent and marginal phenomenon in South Africa, is more often treated by the tabloids than by the academics." In her 2012 MA thesis, Danielle Dunbar comments on the lack of academic interest in the subject:

A small number of alarmist texts have been penned by South Africans in what is termed 'anti-satanist' literature: a voluminous but narrow corpus of work that warns against the dangers of Satanism and the 'satanic influences' of popular youth culture. An even smaller body of works has been written from the academic perspective.

(not taking into account academic theses on Satanism written from a Christian perspective). Some theses or articles written by academics relevant to the Satanic panic in South Africa are listed below:

- Ivey, Gavin (1993). "The psychology of Satanic worship". South African Journal of Psychology. 23 (4). Psychological Society of South Africa: 180–185. doi:10.1177/008124639302300404. S2CID 147519176. "Abstract: A significant amount of media attention has recently been focused on allegations of widespread Satanic activity in South Africa. However, little social scientific research has been forthcoming on the nature, incidence, activities, and psychological dynamics associated with Satanism. In this article I attempt to address this lacuna by examining the definition, history, social context, and ideology of Satanism. Satanism is defined as a specific religious cult, characterised by the inversion of Christian norms and ideology. It is argued that the apparent increase in Satanic activity is related to a socio-economic context of radical cultural change, turmoil, and social instability. Contemporary white adolescents, feeling alienated, anxious, and powerless, are attracted to Satanism as a means of obtaining magical power and control over their destiny. Satanism, in addition, meets specific psychological needs which are not met by other forms of religious worship. In the article I consider the psychological factors which predispose individuals to Satanic activities, and conclude by examining the diagnostic status of demonic possession in clinical psychology."
- Ivey, Gavin (1997). The psychology of Satanic cult involvement: An archetypal object relations perspective (PhD). University of KwaZulu-Natal.
- Faure, Véronique (2006). "In Pursuit of the Occult: The Investigation of Satanism and Witchcraft in South Africa". In Kiernan, James (ed.). The power of the occult in modern Africa: Continuity and innovation in the renewal of African cosmologies. Berlin: Lit Verlag. pp. 153–181. ISBN 3825887618. Véronique Faure is a French psychoanalyst with qualifications in Psychology and Political science who has conducted research in South Africa.
- Wallace, Dale (2006). The Construction and Articulation of a Pagan Identity in South Africa: A Study of the Nature and Implications of a Contested Religious Identity in a Pluralistic Society (PhD). University of KwaZulu-Natal. Dale Wallace is an honorary senior lecturer in Religion Studies at the University of KwaZulu-Natal.
- Petrus, Theodore (2009). An Anthropological Study of Witchcraft-related Crime in the Eastern Cape and its Implications for Law Enforcement Policy and Practice (PDF) (PhD thesis). Nelson Mandela Metropolitan University. Theodore Petrus was a senior lecturer in Anthropology at Nelson Mandela Metropolitan University until 2014.
- Teppo, Annika (2009). "My House is Protected by a Dragon: White South Africans, Magic and Sacred Spaces in Post-Apartheid Cape Town" (PDF). Suomen Antropologi: Journal of the Finnish Anthropological Society. 34 (1): 19–41. doi:10.30676/jfas.v34i1.116493. S2CID 248353444. "The informants of this research are White South Africans from Cape Town, neopagans who practice Wiccan witchcraft and sangomas who practice traditional African religion." Annika Teppo is a Finnish anthropologist. She obtained a PhD in Social and Cultural anthropology from the University of Helsinki in 2004 and has been a senior researcher at the Nordic Africa Institute since October 2012.
- Rousseau, Jacques (14 September 2009). "Goblins and gobbledegook" (PDF). The Star. Jacques Rousseau teaches critical thinking and ethics at the University of Cape Town.
- Falkof, Nicky (2010). "Apartheid's Demons: Satanism and Moral Panic in South Africa". Hagar: Studies in Culture, Politics and Identity. 9 (2). Beer Sheva, Israel: Ben Gurion University: 115–135. Nicky Falkof obtained a PhD in Humanities and Cultural studies from the London Consortium in 2011 and joined the Media Studies department of Wits University as a senior lecturer in April 2013.
- Rousseau, Jacques (23 November 2011). "The Lotters, Harry Potter and SA's judicial system". Daily Maverick.
- Falkof, Nicky (2012). "'Satan has come to Rietfontein': Race in South Africa's Satanic Panic". Journal of Southern African Studies. 38 (4). London: Routledge: 753–767. doi:10.1080/03057070.2012.732290. S2CID 144804619.
- Dunbar, Danielle (2012). The Devil's Children: Volk, Devils and Moral Panics in White South Africa, 1976–1993 (M.A. thesis). Stellenbosch University.
- Dunbar, Danielle; Swart, Sandra (2012). "'No less a foe than Satan himself': The Devil, Transition and Moral Panic in White South Africa, 1989–1993". Journal of Southern African Studies. 38 (3): 601–621. doi:10.1080/03057070.2012.719688. S2CID 145482071.
- Rousseau, Jacques (26 March 2013). "Burn the witch!". Daily Maverick.
- Rousseau, Jacques (12 June 2013). "'Catholic' and 'Muslim' South Africa". Daily Maverick.
- Rousseau, Jacques (13 November 2013). "Occult crime unit is offensive to common sense and morality". GroundUp.
