= Anne Kerke =

English woman executed for witchcraft

Anne Kerke or Anne Kirk (died 4 December 1599) was an English woman executed for witchcraft.

She lived at Castle Alley near Broken Wharf in London. She had allegedly long suspected of being a witch, and became known as "The witch of Wapping".

Reportedly, she had a falling out with a woman in the street. After this, the woman's child shrieked, pined away and died. The same woman's second child and had a fit and became ill after meeting Kerke on the street, recovering as soon as Kerke left. Kirk was further accused of having bewitched a child, to whose christening she had not been invited: the child recovered when one Mother Gillam advised the parents to burn a piece of Kirk's coat with the child's underclothes. Thirdly, Kerke was pointed out by a cunning man as the bewitcher of the child an innkeeper, who died of an illness.

She was accused of having bewitched George Nayler and his sister Anne Nayler to death; when their father had not given her charity money on the funeral, she allegedly bewitched another one of Nayler's daughters, Joan Nayler, who accused Anne Kerke during her fits, after which Joan's father reported Anne Kerke to the magistrate Sir Richard Martin for sorcery.

Sir Richard Martin had heard that witches' hair could not be burnt, and therefore had strands of her cut in an attempt to burn them. Reportedly, her hair blunted and spoiled the scissors, which was seen as incriminating. She was put on trial on November 30, 1599. She was given a death sentence. She was executed by hanging on December 4, 1599, at Tyburn.

She has been claimed to be the first person executed for witchcraft in the city of London after the introduction of the Witchcraft Act of 1563 (in reality that was however Margaret Harkett in 1585).
