= Forest Gate =

Coordinates: 51.550832°N 0.02737°E

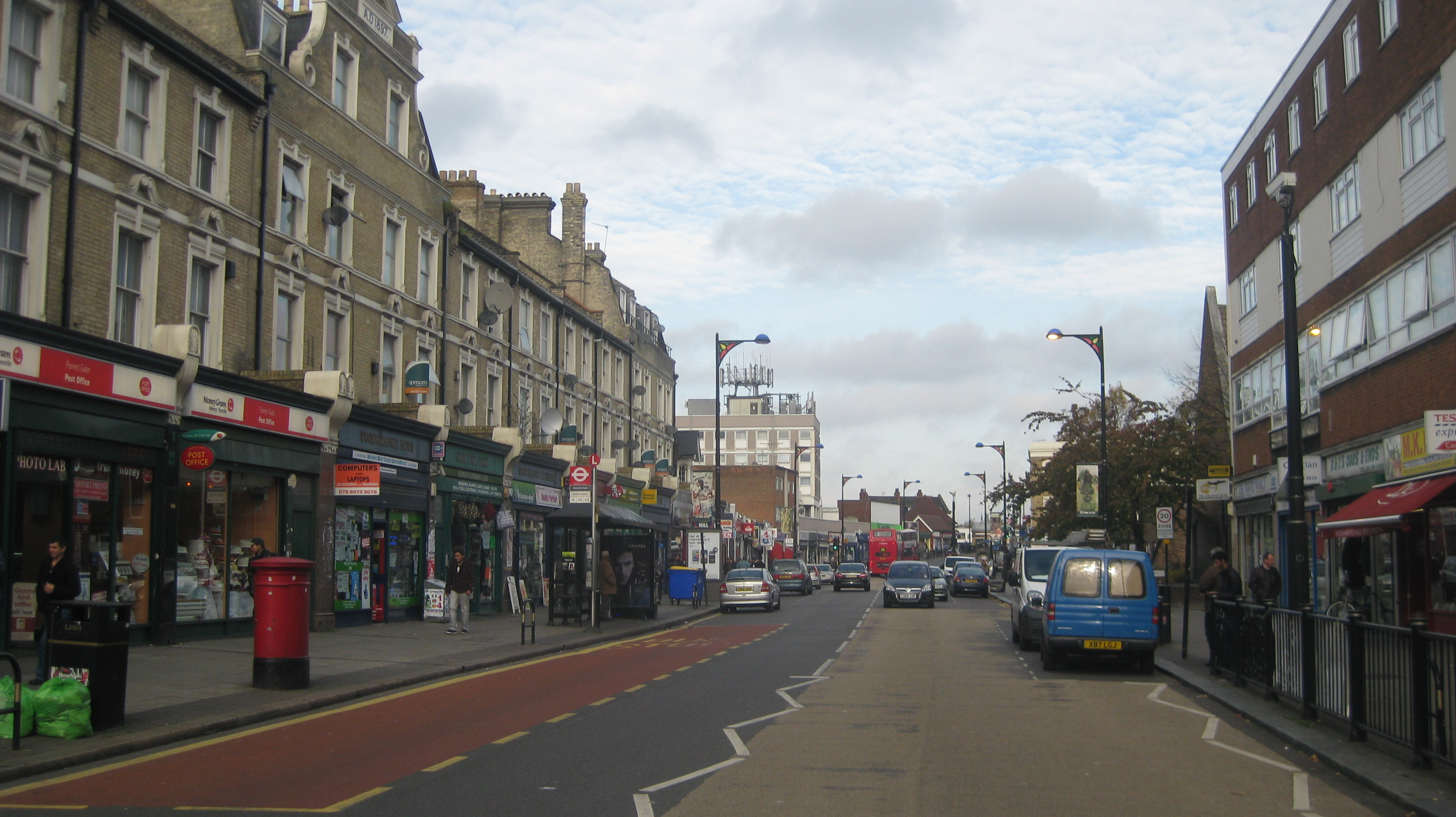
- Woodgrange Road, Forest Gate

- Location within Greater London
- Population: 33,619 (2011 Census. Forest Gate North and South Wards)
- OS grid reference: TQ405855
- London borough: Newham
- Ceremonial county: Greater London
- Region: London
- Country: England
- Sovereign state: United Kingdom
- Post town: LONDON
- Postcode district: E7
- Dialling code: 020
- Police: Metropolitan
- Fire: London
- Ambulance: London
- UK Parliament: Stratford and Bow
- London Assembly: City and East

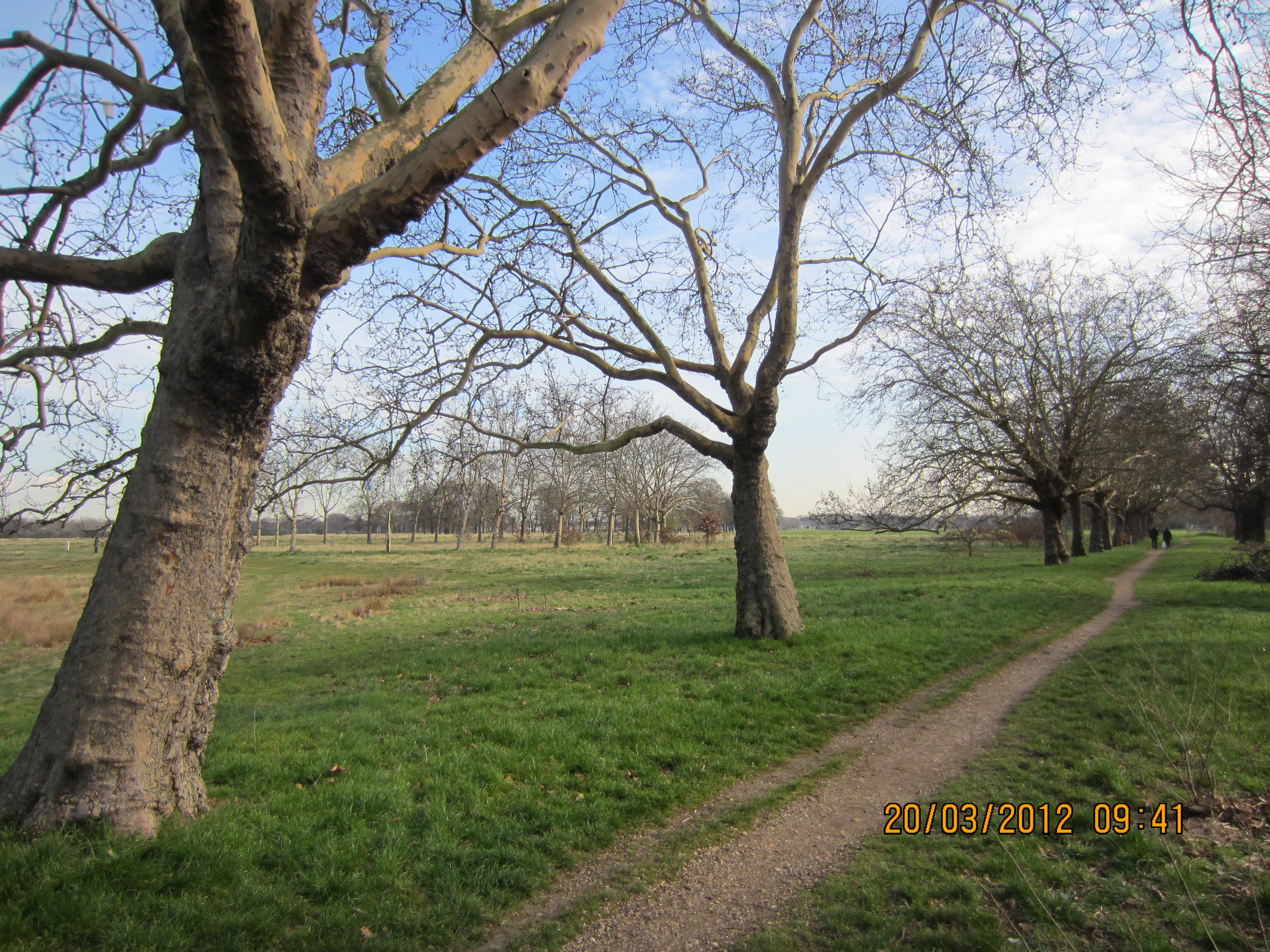
Wanstead Flats at Forest Gate

Forest Gate is a sub-district of West Ham in the London Borough of Newham, East London, England. It is located 7 miles (11 km) northeast of Charing Cross.

The area's name relates to its position adjacent to Wanstead Flats, the southernmost part of Epping Forest. The town was historically part of the parish (and later borough) of West Ham in the hundred of Becontree in Essex. Since 1965, Forest Gate has been part of the London Borough of Newham, a local government district of Greater London. The town forms the majority of the London E7 postcode district.

Neighbouring areas include Leytonstone to the north, East Ham to the east, Plaistow to the south and Stratford to the west.

== Toponymy ==
The first known record of the name 'Forest Gate' comes from the West Ham parish registers of the late 17th century and describes a gate placed across the modern Woodford Road to prevent cattle straying from the open Wanstead Flats area of Epping Forest onto the main Roman road (Romford road) linking Camulodunum to Londinium. The gate was located close to the former Eagle & Child public house. It never was a toll gate and was demolished along with the keepers' cottage in 1881.

The name Woodgrange pre-dates Forest Gate, with a confirmation charter by Richard I in 1189 mentioning, among other donations to the abbey, Richard de Montfitchet's grange in the forest (Woodgrange). Woodgrange remained with Stratford Langthorne Abbey until the Dissolution. Later, the area is marked on John Norden's 1594 'The Description of Essex' with manuscript map.

== History ==
Forest Gate is centred on one of the Roman roads developed out from Londinium between 43CE and 68CE, leaving the north-east corner of the capital Londinium, through Old Ford, Stratford, Forest Gate, Ilford and Romford to Camulodunum (Colchester), being recorded by the Romans as Iter IX in the Antonine Itinerary. Antiquarian Ivan Margary labelled the Roman road as RR3, and it became known as The Great Road.

At the time of the gate's construction, the Forest and its mosaic of habitats (coppice woodland, common grazing and wood pasture) extended from Epping to the Romford Road where a coppice woodland called 'Hamfrith' (meaning the woodland belonging to the Ham area) Wood, which existed until around 1700, formed the southernmost point.

An Anglo-Saxon jewelled pendant was found in Forest Gate in 1875 during sewer construction behind the former Princess Alice public house in the Sprowston Road area. The pendant (or pin) is made of gold, garnet and blue glass, dating to the late sixth or early seventh century with the workmanship suggesting that it belonged to a woman of wealth or high status such as a 'princess' and dates from the 6th–7th centuries (500 – 699 AD). At this time Essex was an independent kingdom with a territory extending over Essex, Middlesex and London and half of Hertfordshire. Having been found as a single object, it is surmised that the bead was lost casually whilst travelling along the ancient Roman road (now the Romford Road) rather than as a burial object, but this is by no means certain as there is a lack of detail about how it was recovered. Stylistically, the piece is said to relate to similar jewellery produced in Kent, which influenced designs in Essex. It is known that King Sledd of Essex married Ricula, the sister of King Æthelberht of Kent in about 580 AD. The piece was acquired by Sir John Evans and was presented to the Ashmolean Museum in Oxford by Sir Arthur Evans in 1909.

The area remained rural until the 19th century. From the 18th century a number of wealthy city dwellers had large country houses in the area and many of them were Quakers; the best known of these were the families of Gurney, Fry and Lester. As the population expanded, new churches were built in the area, such as Emmanuel (1852) and its mission church St Mark's (1893-1898).

In 1890 a fire at the Forest Gate Industrial School in Forest Lane, occupied by children belonging to the Whitechapel Union, killed 26 boys between the ages of 7 and 12 years old.

Forest Gate formed part of the County Borough of West Ham since its creation (initially as a municipal borough) in 1886. The county borough was abolished to form part of the present-day London Borough of Newham in 1965.

Local history blog E7 Now and Then details other Forest Gate history. An ethnographic study of the neighbourhood by researcher Dr Joy White, Terraformed: Young Black Lives in the Inner City, was published in 2020 by Repeater Books.

Newham has the second highest percentage of Muslims in Britain at 24.3% and Forest Gate reflects this with 23.4% stating their religion as Islam in the 2001 census. Many have their roots in Bangladesh and Pakistan and most follow the Sunni Deobandi or the Salafi tradition.

== Governance ==
Forest Gate is part of the Stratford and Bow constituency for elections to the House of Commons.

Forest Gate is divided between the Forest Gate North and Forest Gate South wards for elections to Newham London Borough Council.

== Residential areas ==
The Woodgrange Estate Conservation Area is a residential area with predominantly double-fronted Victorian three and four bedroomed houses built over a period of 15 years from 1877 to 1892 by developer Thomas Corbett and sons who went on to oversee the construction of 1,160 houses, developed to exploit the transport links provided by one of the first Essex lines, opened by Eastern Counties Railway in 1839, running through Forest Gate in 1840. Corbett paid £40,000 (equivalent to £4,000,000 in 2025) for land associated with Woodgrange Farm, Essex, in 1877, which was formerly used as a market garden serving London.

The estate consists of four roads from north to south: Hampton Road; Osborne Road; Claremont Road and Windsor Road, all of which link to Woodgrange Road to the west and contains some of the original route of Margary's RR3: 'The crossing place at Iceland Wharf, Old Ford, has been well established, and from it the eastern road ran north-eastward through Stratford, though its course through Forest Gate and Manor Park appears to be slightly distorted from the true line.' A direct line from the Old Ford crossing, to the ancient river crossing at Ilford, would run east through Forest Gate library, across the estate, east-northeast to the approximate junction of Hampton and Osborne Road.

To the north of the railway running through Forest Gate is the "village" with terraced streets named for the Oxford Martyrs (Latimer, Ridley and Cranmer) running up to the open spaces of Wanstead Flats.

There are blocks of council flats at the western end of Claremont and Windsor roads built on the site of houses damaged during bombing in World War II. Nearby Godwin Junior School in Forest Gate recently picked up a British Council International School Award, while the Ofsted Outstanding-rated Forest Gate Community School remains one of the best in the country, by measure of Progress 8 scores.

== Leisure ==
Forest Gate also houses West Ham Park, providing a place for sports to be played and to the north Forest Gate borders Wanstead Flats, which has numerous football pitches and areas set aside for bio-diversity and walking.

Among the many teams playing on the flats is Sunday League football team Senrab F.C. Based in Forest Gate, Senrab operates fifteen teams for age groups ranging from 5 to 17 years old and has produced several players who have gone on to successful professional careers, including: John Terry (who gave an undisclosed sum to keep the club running in April 2011), Sol Campbell, Jermain Defoe, Ledley King, Bobby Zamora and Paul Konchesky. Several professional coaches also started out at Senrab, most notably Dario Gradi, Ray Wilkins and Alan Curbishley.

Pubs include the Spotted Dog at 212 Upton Lane.

== Transport ==
Forest Gate railway station is in London fare zone 3 on the Great Eastern Main Line. It was first opened in 1840, a year after the line was built, but closed in 1843, before re-opening after pressure from local residents on 31 May 1846. The station is now on the Elizabeth Line, with services westbound to Paddington and eastbound to Shenfield. Other stations in the area include Wanstead Park railway station, which is on the Suffragette line in Zone 3.

=== Bus ===
Forest Gate is on the London Buses network, served by routes: 25, 58, 86, 325, 330, 308 and 425. Night bus N25 and N86 run overnight through Forest Gate.

== Music ==
Forest Gate has various associations with music and acting: it was for many years the home of the Tonic Sol-fa College of John Curwen, which taught large numbers of people to play music without learning conventional notation and the Forest Gate School of Music. In December 1966 Jimi Hendrix wrote Purple Haze in the Upper Cut Club, owned by Douglas Bayle and George and Billy Walker, it had been opened by The Who, and had The Small Faces as the house band, for a while. It later became the Ace of Clubs in Woodgrange Road. De Underground Records, the seminal jungle/drum and bass record shop and studio was located in Sebert Road, Forest Gate, from 1991 to 1996. The Newham Generals (D Double E & Footsie) are also from Forest Gate, and the video for their song 'Frontline' was filmed at Forest Gate railway station. Ben Drew aka Plan B grew up in Forest Gate and lived in Hampton Road on the Woodgrange Estate. Depeche Mode started recording in John Bassett's studio on Sebert Road. The first Rock Against Racism concert was held at the Princess Alice pub at the junction of Romford Road and Woodgrange Road in 1976.

Damnably Records began in Forest Gate on Salisbury Road and many of its bands including Shonen Knife, Geoff Farina, and Chris Brokaw. Wussy stayed or visited there while on tour and Kath Bloom played a house concert there in 2011. Based in the same E7 cul de sac are Vacilando '68 Recordings (previously operating as The Orchestra Pit Recording Co.) who have released vinyl records by international artists such as Howe Gelb, Orkesta Mendoza, Marianne Dissard and Naim Amor, as well as having a heavy involvement in the Medway music scene through the likes of The Singing Loins, Theatre Royal and Stuart Turner and the Flat Earth Society. Damnably and Vacilando '68 have teamed up numerous times to promote live shows including at the now defunct Moka East based in the Queen Elizabeth Olympic Park.

== Sport ==
Forest Gate is home to non-league football club Clapton CFC., who completed the purchase of London's oldest senior football ground The Old Spotted Dog Ground in 2020. The area is also home to well-known Sunday league side Senrab F.C.

== Notable people ==
=== Business and politics ===
- Sam Alper – caravan designer and founder of Little Chef
- Sir David Amess – Conservative MP (Basildon 1983 to 1997, Southend West 1997 to 2021)
- Tony Banks, Baron Stratford – Labour MP (Newham North West 1983 to 1997, West Ham 1997 to 2005)
- Dawn Butler – Labour MP (Brent South 2005 to 2010)
- Mark Stephens – lawyer, mediator, broadcaster, writer

=== Sport ===
Former managers of West Ham United Football Club associated with Forest Gate include Alan Curbishley and Ted Fenton. Other footballers from the area include England international Ken Brown, Republic of Ireland international Chris Hughton, Simon Royce, Jason Lee, Linvoy Primus, Bondz N'Gala and Jay-Emmanuel Thomas.

JJ Jegede, the long jumper, was born and raised in Forest Gate and won the silver medal at the 2011 UK Championships and gold at 2012 UK Indoor Championships.

Mark Hunter was born and raised in Forest Gate and won the gold medal in the lightweight double scull at the 2008 Beijing Olympics and gold medals in the lightweight double scull at 2010 and 2011 World Championships.

Other sportsmen and women connected with Forest Gate include heavyweight boxing champions Billy Wells and Lennox Lewis, 7 times world karate champion Molly Samuel, cricketer Ravi Bopara, sprinter Damien Greaves, Olympic fencer Linda Strachan, and Olympic and Commonwealth Games athlete Jean Desforges.

=== Arts and entertainment ===
Anna Neagle was born in the area in 1905, and has a road named after her off Dames Road. Other actors born in Forest Gate include David Farrar, Malcolm McFee, Billy Murray, Terrence Hardiman and Chiwetel Ejiofor.

Other actors associated with the area include The Wire star Idris Elba, and Eastenders' Ricky Norwood.

Jimi Hendrix is reputed to have composed "Purple Haze" in the Upper Cut Club in Woodgrange Road. Musicians from Forest Gate include biographer, composer and pianist Norman Charles Suckling, John Ashton, Kele Le Roc and heavy metal vocalist Sarah Jezebel Deva. Ronnie Lane of the Small Faces was born in Plaistow but spent his childhood and early adulthood in Forest Gate, living at 385 Romford Road. Roy Carter, a rhythm guitarist with 70s hit funk band Heatwave, was raised in Forest Gate.

Some British hip hop artists are associated with the area including D Double E and Tempa T. Top-selling Grime artist and rapper Plan B, has a song "Raking the Dead" which refers to a friend who discovered a body on Wanstead Flats.

Artists from Forest Gate include Betsy Schneider, John Bowstead, Walter Westley Russell and Barry Windsor-Smith. Writer Mary Renault was born in the area.

=== Other ===
- Hannah Dadds - the first female train driver on the London Underground
- Christopher Charles Dalliston – Dean of Newcastle
- Vera Day – glamour girl and actress
- Elizabeth Fry – prison reformer, lived at The Cedars on Portway between 1829 and 1844.
- John Grahl – economist
- Joseph McCabe – writer and speaker on freethought
- Claude Scudamore Jarvis – British colonial governor
- Edward Whymper – climber, who married at Emmanuel Church in 1906
- Jane Rebecca Yorke – the last person convicted under the Witchcraft Act 1735 (9 Geo. 2. c. 5)
- Shirley Anne Field - Actress
- Liam Charles (Chip) Cottonwood - Long Haired Boy

== See also ==
- Forest Gate railway station
- London Borough of Newham
- Stratford
- 2 June 2006 Forest Gate raid
