= Jill Viner =

English bus driver (1952–1996)

Jill Viner (1952–1996) was an English bus driver known for being the first woman to drive a London bus in passenger service.

== Career ==
Viner was born in 1952 and wanted to drive buses from when she was eight years old. She trained to become a bus driver at a centre in Chiswick in London and achieved her driver seniority on 25 May 1974, when she was aged 22. She started driving buses later in 1974, when London Transport were said to be 3,200 drivers short. Viner drove RT type and RM type buses on route 65 and was based at the Norbiton bus garage in Kingston upon Thames. She worked at Norbiton until its closure in 1993.

Viner said that "there have been a few surprised looks from passengers at stops who have spotted that a woman was driving. They must be the ones the conductors have told me have fallen up the stairs. I’m too busy concentrating on my job to see what other people are doing."

== Death ==
Viner died in 1996.

== Legacy ==
While women had previously driven buses within bus depots during the World War II, Viner was the first women to drive a bus in service in London. In the weeks after Viner started driving, it was reported that thirty women had applied to become bus drivers. Despite this, in the subsequent years hiring of female drivers was slow. London Transport began proactively recruiting female bus drivers in 1980, but over forty years later in 2021 it was noted that there are still relatively few female bus drivers.

In 2023, the Tunnel Boring Machine (TBM) machine "Jill', which is delivering a new public-transport focused tunnel to link Newham to the Greenwich Peninsula in London, was named in Viner's honour.

In 2024, a blue plaque celebrating Viner was unveiled at Cromwell Road bus station in Kingston upon Thames, as part of the Women in Bus and Coach (WiBC) initiative. The unveiling ceremony was hosted by Lorna Murphy, the Transport for London's Director of Buses, and Paul Sainthouse, Managing Director of Dawsongroup Bus and Coaches. The London Transport Museum has a copy of this plaque.

The London Transport Museum Patrons Circle scheme has each level named after an influential figure in London’s transport history and has a "Jill Viner Patrons Circle Level" named in Viner's honour.

== See also ==
- Hannah Dadds, first female train driver on the London Underground
- Berta Persson, first woman bus driver in Sweden.
