= Witchcraft Suppression Act, 1957 =

South African law

Parliament of South Africa
- Long title: Act to provide for the suppression of the practice of witchcraft and similar practices.
- Citation: Act 3 of 1957
- Enacted by: Parliament of South Africa
- Assented to: 19 February 1957
- Commenced: 22 February 1957

Amended by
- Witchcraft Suppression Amendment Act 50 of 1970
- Status: In force

The Witchcraft Suppression Act 3 of 1957 is an act of the Parliament of South Africa that prohibits various activities related to witchcraft, witch smelling or witch-hunting. It is based on the Witchcraft Suppression Act 1895 of the Cape Colony, which was in turn based on the Witchcraft Act 1735 of Great Britain.

== Provisions ==
The act criminalises a number of actions. The following two crimes, the most serious under the act, attract a fine of up to R400,000 or imprisonment for up to 10 years.

- Imputing to any other person the causing, by supernatural means, of any disease in or injury or damage to any person or thing, or naming or indicating any other person as a wizard.
- In circumstances indicating that the accused professes or pretends to use any supernatural power, witchcraft, sorcery, enchantment or conjuration, imputing the cause of death of, injury or grief to, disease in, damage to or disappearance of any person or thing to any other person.

If the person in question was killed as a consequence, or if the accused is by habit or repute a witch-finder, the sentence is increased to imprisonment for up to 20 years, and in that case the offence is presumed to have caused the killing unless proven otherwise.

The following three crimes attract a fine of up to R200,000 or imprisonment for up to five years or both.

- Employing or soliciting any witch doctor, witch-finder or any other person to name or indicate any person as a wizard.
- Professing a knowledge of witchcraft, or the use of charms, and advising any person how to bewitch, injure or damage any person or thing, or supplying any person with any pretended means of witchcraft.
- On the advice of any witch doctor, witch-finder or other person or on the ground of any pretended knowledge of witchcraft, using or causing to be put into operation any means or process which, in accordance with such advice or the accused's own belief, is calculated to injure or damage any person or thing.

The following crime attracts a fine of up to R80,000 or imprisonment for up to two years.

- For gain pretending to exercise or use any supernatural power, witchcraft, sorcery, enchantment or conjuration, or undertaking to tell fortunes, or pretending from skill in or knowledge of any occult science to discover where and in what manner anything supposed to have been stolen or lost may be found.

The act also repealed the various witchcraft laws inherited from the colonies from which South Africa was formed.

== History ==
The Witchcraft Suppression Bill was introduced in Parliament in January 1957 by Charles Robberts Swart, the Minister of Justice. It was intended to consolidate the existing laws on witchcraft and to increase the penalties applied. The act was very similar to the Cape Colony's Witchcraft Suppression Act of 1895, which had remained in force in the Cape Province until 1957. In 1970 the act was amended to add one offence and to replace fines denominated in pounds with fines denominated in rand.

Since the end of apartheid in 1994, there have been a number of reviews of the witchcraft legislation. In 1996, the government of the Northern Province appointed a "Commission of Enquiry into Witchcraft Violence and Ritual Murder", also known as the Ralushai Commission after its chairman Professor Victor Ralushai. The commission recommended that the act should be repealed and replaced by a Witchcraft Control Act which would definitely criminalise the actual practise of witchcraft, unlike the current act which focuses on accusations and pretended witchcraft.

In 1998, the Commission for Gender Equality held a "National Conference on Witchcraft Violence", which produced a statement (the "Thohoyandou Declaration on Ending Witchcraft Violence") calling for the repeal of the act and the introduction of new legislation to deal with witchcraft and witch-hunts.

As a consequence of the proposed Mpumalanga Witchcraft Suppression Bill in 2007, both the South African Pagan Rights Alliance (representing Neopagans) and the Traditional Healers Organisation (representing African traditional healers) approached the South African Law Reform Commission (SALRC) for a review of both the Mpumalanga bill and the 1957 act. In 2010, an investigation was approved for inclusion in the SALRC's programme; a discussion paper was published in 2016 and a further revised discussion paper in 2022. The discussion paper proposes that Parliament should repeal the Witchcraft Suppression Act and enact a "Prohibition of Harmful Witchcraft Practices Act" which would prohibit accusations of witchcraft, witch-finding, specific practices of harmful witchcraft, and acts related to muti killing.
