= Hannah Dadds =

British train driver

- Hannah Dadds, the first female train driver on the London Underground
- Born: Hannah Maureen Elsie Head; 16 October 1941; Forest Gate, Newham
- Died: 26 November 2011 (aged 70); Rainham, London
- Occupation: Train driver
- Years active: 1969–1993

Hannah Maureen Elsie Dadds (née Head, 16 October 1941 – 26 November 2011) was a British train driver known for being the first female train driver on the London Underground.

== Early life ==
Hannah Dadds (née Head) was from the Forest Gate area of Newham. Her mother was a home help and her father worked in the furniture trade. After leaving school at 15, she worked as a shop assistant at the Co-op, and later in the Bryant and May match factory and the Kensitas cigarette factory.

== London Underground career ==
In 1969, Dadds joined the London Underground, working as a 'railwoman' at Upton Park Underground station. She then worked as a ticket collector and in 1976 she became a train guard. Train guards were also emergency drivers in case something happened to the driver or if there was an accident. While male guards could train further in order to become a driver, female guards could not. The Sex Discrimination Act 1975 removed this barrier, and many women applied to become Tube train drivers. Dadds was one of the first to qualify for the programme.

In 1978, Dadds completed a seven-week training course to qualify as a train driver, and became a driver on the District line. In doing so, she became the first female train driver on the London Underground. This was big news and newspapers and radio stations wanted to interview her after news of her appointment was leaked from head office. Instead of completing her training in the usual way, she was asked to stay off work for a few days to allow staff at 55 Broadway (London Transport's head office) time to organise a press conference.

It has been suggested that Dadds could have been selected to drive the first Jubilee line train in 1979, but she could not drive it due to a foot injury.

Hannah's sister Edna also joined the London Underground. Edna also worked first as a guard and then became a driver. Hannah and Edna became the first all-female crew on the London Underground.

While the Dadds sisters were able to work in previously male positions, the working culture remained masculinized. A male coworker described them as being "like men... They swore more than we did, they smoked more than we did and they gave a lot of lip to the management, more than we did."

Dadds worked as a driver with the London Underground until she took early retirement in 1993, after which she moved to Spain. The London Transport Museum made an oral history recording with Dadds in 1993 in which she described her career.

In 2004, she was invited to a Queen's Women of Achievement lunch at Buckingham Palace; other women attending that year included Margaret Thatcher, JK Rowling, Kate Moss and Charlotte Church.

== Death and tributes ==
Dadds died after a long illness on 26 November 2011 in Rainham, London. Speaking after her death, Howard Collins, chief executive of London Underground, said: "Hannah Dadds changed the working life of women on the Tube and the way in which many people viewed Tube drivers" and that "She was an esteemed member of our workforce."

A plaque was unveiled in her honour at Upton Park station on 31 May 2019.

== See also ==
- Jill Viner, first female bus driver for London Transport
