= Witchcraft Acts =

Acts of the Parliament of England and Great Britain

The Witchcraft Acts were a historical succession of governing laws in England, Scotland, Wales, Ireland, and the British colonies on penalties for the practice, or—in later years—rather for pretending to practice witchcraft.

== Witchcraft Act 1541 ==
Witchcraft Act 1541
- Act of Parliament
- Parliament of England
- Long title: An Act against Conjurations, Witchcrafts, Sorcery and Inchantments.
- Citation: 33 Hen. 8. c. 8
- Territorial extent: England and Wales

Dates
- Royal assent: 1 April 1542
- Commencement: 1 May 1542 (Note: Section 1.)
- Repealed: 28 July 1863
Other legislation
Repealed by	Statute Law Revision Act 1863
Relates to	Witchcraft Act 1562; Witchcraft Act 1603; Witchcraft Act 1735

Status: Repealed

Text of statute as originally enacted

Religious tensions in England during the 16th and 17th centuries resulted in the introduction of serious penalties for witchcraft. King Henry VIII's Witchcraft Act 1541 (33 Hen. 8. c. 8) was the first act to define witchcraft as a felony, a crime punishable by death and the forfeiture of goods and chattels. It was forbidden to:

... use devise practise or exercise, or cause to be devysed practised or exercised, any Invovacons or cojuracons of Sprites witchecraftes enchauntementes or sorceries to thentent to fynde money or treasure or to waste consume or destroy any persone in his bodie membres, or to pvoke [provoke] any persone to unlawfull love, or for any other unlawfull intente or purpose ... or for dispite of Cryste, or for lucre of money, dygge up or pull downe any Crosse or Crosses or by such Invovacons or cojuracons of Sprites witchecraftes enchauntementes or sorceries or any of them take upon them to tell or declare where goodes stollen or lost shall become ...

The act also removed the benefit of clergy, a legal device that exempted the accused from the jurisdiction of the King's courts, from those convicted of witchcraft. This statute was repealed by Henry's son, Edward VI, in 1547.

== Witchcraft Act 1562 ==
Witchcraft Act 1562
- Act of Parliament
- Parliament of England
- Long title: An Act Against Conjurations, Enchantments and Witchcrafts.
- Citation: 5 Eliz. 1. c. 16
- Territorial extent: England and Wales

Dates
- Royal assent: 10 April 1563
- Commencement: 1 June 1563 (Note: Section 1.)
- Repealed: 29 September 1604
Other legislation
Repealed by	Witchcraft Act 1603
Relates to	Witchcraft Act 1541; Witchcraft Act 1735

Status: Repealed

Text of statute as originally enacted

An 1562 Act Against Conjurations, Enchantments and Witchcrafts (5 Eliz. 1. c. 16) was passed early in the reign of Elizabeth I. It was in some respects more merciful towards those found guilty of witchcraft than its predecessor, demanding the death penalty only where harm had been caused; lesser offences were punishable by a term of imprisonment. The act provided that anyone who should "use, practise, or exercise any Witchcraft, Enchantment, Charm, or Sorcery, whereby any person shall happen to be killed or destroyed", was guilty of a felony without benefit of clergy, and was to be put to death.

Indictments for homicide caused by witchcraft begin to appear in the historical record in the period following the passage of the 1563 act. Out of the 1,158 homicide victims identified in the surviving records, 228 or 20.6% were suspected of being killed by witchcraft. By comparison, poison was suspected in only 31 of the cases. Out of the 157 people accused of killing with witchcraft, roughly half were acquitted. Only nine of the accused were men.

== Scottish Witchcraft Act 1563 ==
Witchcraft Act (Scotland) 1563
- Act of Parliament
- Parliament of Scotland
- Long title: Anent the using of witchcraftis sorsarie and necromancie.
- Citation: 1563 c. 9 [12mo ed: c. 73]
- Territorial extent: Scotland

Dates
- Royal assent: 4 June 1563
- Repealed: 24 June 1736
Other legislation
Repealed by	Witchcraft Act 1735

Status: Repealed

Text of statute as originally enacted

Under the Scottish Witchcraft Act 1563, enacted effective 4 June 1563, both the practice of witchcraft and consulting with witches were capital offences. This act remained on Scottish statute books until it was repealed as a result of a House of Lords amendment to the bill for the post-union Witchcraft Act 1735.

== Irish Witchcraft Act 1586 ==
Witchcraft Act (Ireland) 1586
- Act of Parliament
- Parliament of Ireland
- Long title: An Act against Witchcraft and Sorcerie.
- Citation: 28 Eliz. 1. c. 2 (I)
- Territorial extent: Ireland

Dates
- Royal assent: 1586
- Commencement: 1586
- Repealed: 2 September 1829
Other legislation
Amended by	Witchcraft, etc. (Ireland) Act 1821
Repealed by	Offences Against the Person (Ireland) Act 1829

Status: Repealed

Text of statute as originally enacted

The Irish Witchcraft Act 1586 act (28 Eliz. 1. c. 2 (I), An Act against Witchcraft and Sorcerie) was largely identical to the English Witchcraft Act 1562. The penalty for causing death by witchcraft was as a felony without benefit of clergy (that is, capital punishment), which was also the penalty for a second offence of causing injury or material loss by witchcraft; for a first such offence, the penalty was one year's imprisonment including six hours in the pillory once per quarter. This was also the penalty for a first offence of using witchcraft to "discover hidden treasure, ... or stolen goods, or to provoke unlawful love"; for a second such offence, it was life imprisonment.

The last prosecution under the 1586 act was the 1711 Islandmagee witch trial. Nobody is known for certain to have been executed under the act. Of those accused of causing death by witchcraft, William Sellor was convicted at the Islandmagee trial, but there is no surviving record of his sentence; Florence Newton died during her 1661 trial; Marion Fisher's 1655 conviction was overturned by Sir James Barry; and the strangling of a suspected witch in Antrim in 1698 was a lynching.

The 1586 act was repealed in 1821 by the Witchcraft, etc. (Ireland) Act 1821 (1 & 2 Geo. 4. c. 18).

== Witchcraft Act 1603 ==
Witchcraft Act 1603
- Act of Parliament
- Parliament of England
- Long title: An Act against Conjuration, Witchcraft and dealing with evil and wicked spirits.
- Citation: 1 Jas. 1. c. 12
- Territorial extent: England and Wales

Dates
- Royal assent: 7 July 1604
- Commencement: 29 September 1604 (Note: Section 1. The Feast of Saint Michael the Archangel)
- Repealed: 24 June 1736
Other legislation
Repeals/revokes	Witchcraft Act 1562
Repealed by	Witchcraft Act 1735
Relates to	Witchcraft Act 1541

Status: Repealed

Text of statute as originally enacted

In 1603, the year James VI and I's accession to the English throne, the Elizabethan act was broadened by Edward Coke and others to bring the penalty of death without benefit of clergy to any one who invoked evil spirits or communed with familiar spirits. The act's full title was An Act against Conjuration, Witchcraft and dealing with evil and wicked spirits, (1 Jas. 1. c. 12). It was this statute that was enforced by Matthew Hopkins, the self-styled Witch-Finder General.

The acts of Elizabeth and James changed the law of witchcraft by making it a felony, thus removing the accused from the jurisdiction of the ecclesiastical courts to the courts of common law. This provided, at least, that the accused persons theoretically enjoyed the benefits of ordinary criminal procedure. Burning at the stake was eliminated except in cases of witchcraft that were also petty treason; most convicted were hanged instead. Any witch who had committed a minor witchcraft offence (punishable by one year in prison) and was accused and found guilty a second time was sentenced to death.

=== Colonial use ===
The Witchcraft Act 1603 was employed in the British American colonies, e.g., in the trial of Margaret Mattson, a woman accused of witchcraft in the Province of Pennsylvania. (She was acquitted by William Penn after trial in Philadelphia in 1683.)

== Scottish Witchcraft Act 1649 ==
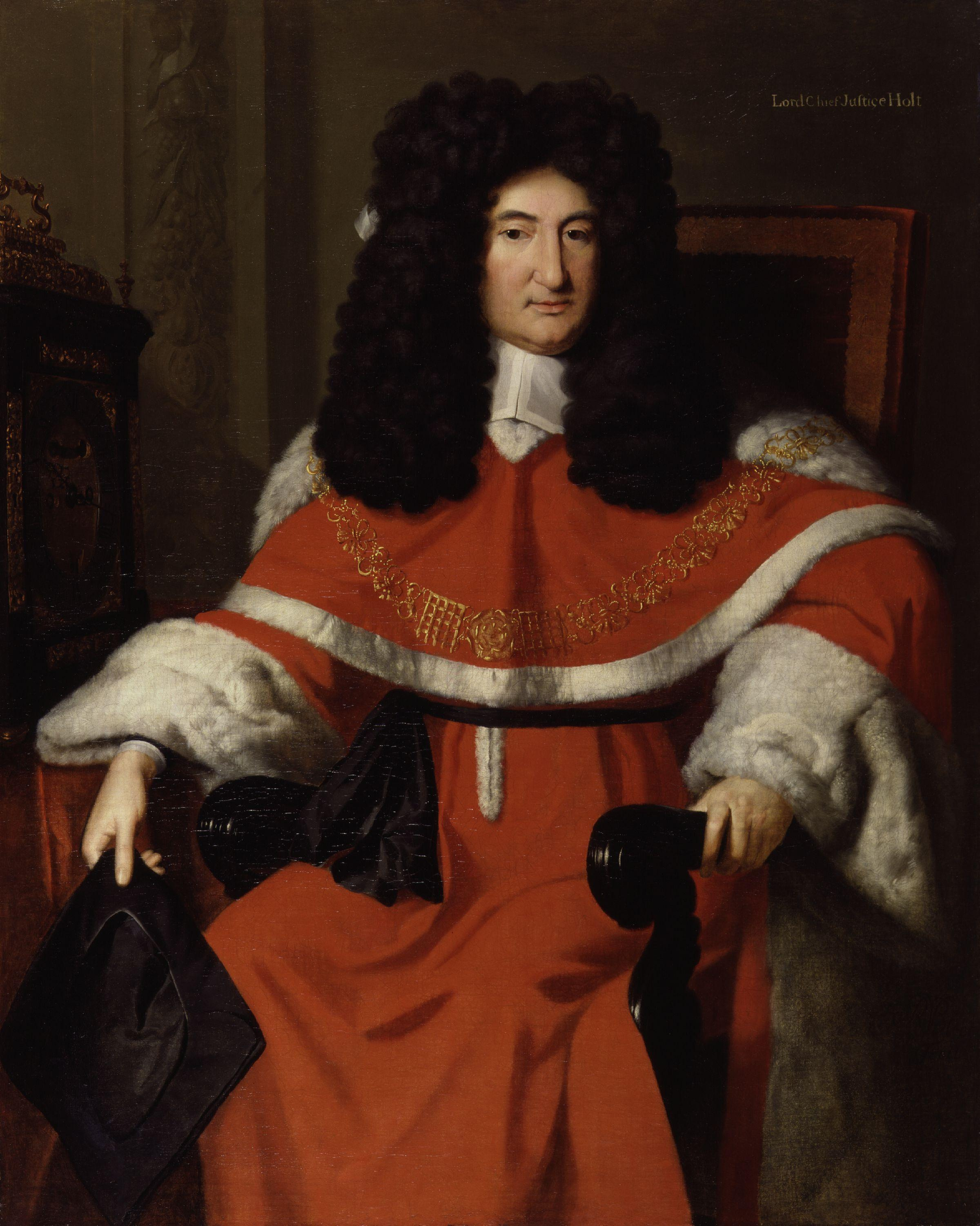
Lord Chief Justice of England Sir John Holt by Richard van Bleeck, c. 1700. Holt greatly influenced the end of prosecutions for witchcraft in England. National Portrait Gallery, London.

Through the 1640s the General Assembly of the Church of Scotland and the Commission of the Kirk lobbied for the enforcement and extension of the Witchcraft Act 1563, which had been the basis of previous witch trials. The Covenanter regime passed a series of acts to enforce godliness in 1649, which made capital offences of blasphemy, the worship of false gods and for beaters and cursers of their parents. They also passed a new witchcraft act that ratified the existing act of 1563 and extended it to deal with consulters of "Devils and familiar spirits", who would now be punished with death.

== Witchcraft Act 1735 ==
The Witchcraft Act 1735 (9 Geo. 2 c. 5) marked a complete reversal in attitudes. Penalties for the practice of witchcraft as traditionally constituted, which by that time was considered by many influential figures to be an impossible crime, were replaced by penalties for the pretence of witchcraft. A person who claimed to have the power to call up spirits, or foretell the future, or cast spells, or discover the whereabouts of stolen goods, was to be punished as a vagrant and a con artist, subject to fines and imprisonment. The Act applied to the whole of Great Britain, repealing both the 1563 Scottish act and the 1604 English act.

The Witchcraft Act 1735 remained in force in Britain well into the 20th century, until its eventual repeal with the enactment of the Fraudulent Mediums Act 1951 (14 & 15 Geo. 6. c. 33).

The Fraudulent Mediums Act 1951 was repealed on 26 May 2008 by new Consumer Protection Regulations following an EU directive targeting unfair sales and marketing practices.

== Other related acts ==
- The Witchcraft Suppression Act, 1957 of South Africa, which is still in force, was based on the Witchcraft Act 1735.
- An Act, Against Conjuration, Witchcraft, and Dealing with Evil and Wicked Spirits, passed by the Massachusetts Bay Colony General Court, October 1692.

== See also ==
- Bideford witch trial: Trial of the last three people known to have been executed in England for alleged witchcraft, in 1682.
- Janet Horne: The last person to be legally executed for witchcraft in the British Isles, in 1727.
- Helen Duncan: The last person to be imprisoned under the Witchcraft Act 1735, in April 1944. Her conviction led to the repeal of the Act and the introduction of the Fraudulent Mediums Act 1951.
- Jane Rebecca Yorke, the last person convicted under the Witchcraft Act 1735, in September 1944. Found guilty on seven counts, and fined £5.
- Margaret Mattson: A woman accused of witchcraft in the Province of Pennsylvania; acquitted by William Penn after trial in Philadelphia in 1683.
- Laws against witchcraft

== Bibliography ==
- Brosseau Gardner, Gerald (2004), The Meaning of Witchcraft, Red Wheel/Weiser, ISBN 978-1-57863-309-8
- Gibson, Marion (2006), "Witchcraft in the Courts", in Gibson, Marion (ed.), Witchcraft And Society in England And America, 1550–1750, Continuum International Publishing Group, pp. 1–9, ISBN 978-0-8264-8300-3
- Larner, Christine (1981), Enemies of God, Chatto and Windus, ISBN 0-7011-2424-5
