= Margaret Mattson =

American woman tried for witchcraft in 1684

Margaret Mattson was one of two women tried and acquitted in Philadelphia, in the Province of Pennsylvania, for witchcraft in 1684.

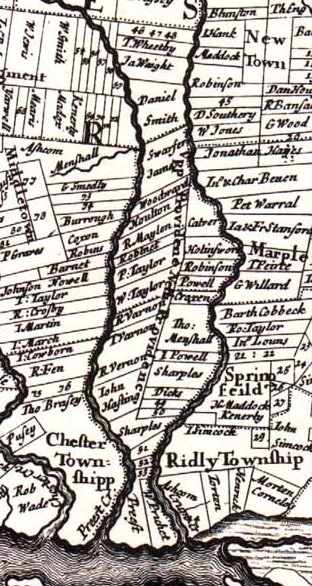
Thomas Holme's 1687 map of Pennsylvania, created just a few years after Margaret Matson's trial.

== Biography ==
Nils and Margaret Mattson arrived in the colony of New Sweden, which comprised present-day Delaware, southeast Pennsylvania, southern New Jersey, and the very northeast corner of Maryland on May 20, 1654, on the ship Örn (the Eagle), first settling at a place known as Herring Island, in present-day New Castle County, Delaware. By 1670, they relocated to land by the Crum Creek in present-day Eddystone, Delaware County, Pennsylvania.

Of Swedish-Finnish descent, Nils and Margaret were reputed healers working from Finnish tradition. Per land records, they had a batstow (bastu) or sauna/bathhouse, which the English would have found as strange and indecent, since both men and women would be inside unclothed, but they did tolerate it.

The Swedes and Finns used their bathhouses in a similar way to the Lenape, though with some differences. In the Lenape’s bathhouses, known as sweat lodges, participants howled and made animal noises, each person imitating the creature connected to their spirit, while the Swedes and Finns reportedly did not. The bathhouses of the Swedes and Finns reportedly reached temperatures as high as 167 degrees fahrenheit. Using bundles of birch branches, they smacked themselves to stimulate circulation before running directly into cold water. In the winter, they rolled in the snow, an act believed to increase strength and vitality. The Swedes and Finns saw the bastu as ordinary, healthy, and spiritual. They had no shame in being nude together, because it was deeply rooted in cultural tradition. Because bastus were always built near water, the Matsons' bathhouse was almost certainly within a few running steps of Crum Creek, near their homestead. A life-size replica of a bastu can be visited today at the Swedish Homestead in Governor Printz Park, Essington, Pennsylvania, not far from where the Mattsons once lived.

In 1683/4, some of Margaret's neighbors claimed that she had bewitched cattle, among other charges. Charges of practicing witchcraft were brought before the Pennsylvania Provincial Council on 7th Day, 12th Month, 1683 (under Julian calendar). This occurred nineteen years after the Swedish territory became a British common law colony and subject to English Witchcraft Act 1603. Of note, Margaret would never have faced execution, as the harsh English criminal code was not adopted until 1718. In Penn’s colony, at the time of Margaret's trial, the most severe outcome for witchcraft was a peace bond, since the Great Law of Pennsylvania emphasized good behavior over harsh punishment.

Accused by several neighbors, Mattson's alleged crimes included making threats against neighbors, causing cows to give little milk, bewitching and killing livestock and appearing to witnesses in spectral form. On 7th Day, 12th Month (February), 1683, charges against Mattson and a neighbor Gertro (a.k.a. Yeshro Hendrickson) Jacobsson, wife of Hendrick Jacobsson, were brought by the Attorney General before a grand jury of 21 men overseen by the colony's proprietor, William Penn. The grand jury returned a true bill indictment that afternoon, and the cases proceeded to trial. A petit jury of 12 men was selected by Penn and an interpreter was appointed for the Finnish women, who did not speak English. Penn barred the use of prosecution and defense lawyers, conducted the questioning himself, and permitted the introduction of unsubstantiated hearsay. In the early days of Pennsylvania, the use of attorneys was discouraged, as they were seen as symbols of oppression. Penn himself gave the closing charge and directions to the jury, but what he told them was not transcribed. According to the minutes of the Provincial Council, dated 27th Day, 12th Month (February), 1683, (or 1684 Gregorian), the jury returned with a verdict of "Guilty of having the Comon Fame of a Witch, but not Guilty in manner and Forme as Shee stands Endicted."

Thus Mattson was found guilty of having the reputation of a witch, but not guilty of bewitching animals. Neither woman was convicted of witchcraft, as such a conviction was not legally possible in Pennsylvania at the time. The accused were released on their husbands posting recognizance bonds and promising six months' good behavior.

A popular legend tells of William Penn dismissing the charges against Mattson by affirming her legal right to fly on a broomstick, saying "Well, I know of no law against it." The record fails to show any such commentary, but the story probably reflects popular views of Penn's socially progressive Quaker values.

The earliest known appearance of the broomstick story is in Amelia Mott Gummere’s Witchcraft and Quakerism (1908), more than two centuries after the trial. The following year, it was repeated in the Journal of the Friends’ Historical Society (1909), from which it spread into Quaker histories and later retellings. Neither George Smith (1862) nor Henry Graham Ashmead (1884), in their Histories of Delaware County, mention any such story when discussing the trial, suggesting that it was not part of earlier tradition.

In 2026, Margaret Mattson’s story is scheduled to be featured in For the Common Good: the Women Who Shaped Our Nation, a nine-part docuseries funded by The National Society of the Colonial Dames of America in the Commonwealth of Pennsylvania and produced by You’ll Never Forget Productions. The film highlights women who made important contributions to the founding of America, including Mattson.

== Other sources ==
- Jordan, John W. A History of Delaware County, Pennsylvania. (Lewis Historical Publishing Company, New York. 1914)
- Benson, Adolph B. and Naboth Hedin, eds. Swedes in America, 1638–1938 (The Swedish American Tercentenary Association. New Haven, CT: Yale University Press. 1938) ISBN 978-0-8383-0326-9
