= Witchcraft Act 1735 =

Act of the Parliament of Great Britain

Witchcraft Act 1735 (Note: The citation of this act by this short title was authorised by section 1 of, and the first schedule to, the Short Titles Act 1896. Due to the repeal of those provisions it is now authorised by section 19(2) of the Interpretation Act 1978.)
- Act of Parliament
- Parliament of Great Britain
- Long title: An Act to repeal the statute made in the first year of the reign of King James the First, intituled, An Act against conjuration, witchcraft, and dealing with evil and wicked spirits, except so much thereof as repeals an Act of the fifth year of the reign of Queen Elizabeth, Against conjurations, inchantments and witchcrafts, and to repeal, an Act passed in the parliament of Scotland in the ninth parliament of Queen Mary, intituled, Anentis witchcrafts, and for punishing such persons as pretend to exercise or use any kind of witchcraft, sorcery, inchantment, or conjuration.
- Citation: 9 Geo. 2. c. 5
- Introduced by: John Conduitt; Sir John Crosse; George Heathcote; (Commons)
- Territorial extent: Great Britain

Dates
- Royal assent: 24 March 1736
- Commencement: 24 June 1736 (Note: Section 1.)
- Repealed: 22 June 1951
Other legislation
Repeals/revokes	Witchcraft Act 1563; Witchcraft Act 1603
Amended by	Statute Law Revision Act 1867; Statute Law Revision Act 1887; Statute Law Revision Act 1888
Repealed by	Fraudulent Mediums Act 1951
Relates to	Vagrancy Act 1824

Status: Repealed

Text of statute as originally enacted

The Witchcraft Act 1735 (9 Geo. 2. c. 5) was an act of the Parliament of Great Britain in 1735 which made it a crime for a person to claim that any human being had magical powers or was guilty of practising witchcraft. With this, the law abolished the hunting and executions of witches in Great Britain. The maximum penalty set out by the act was a year's imprisonment.

It thus marks the end point of the witch trials in the Early Modern period for Great Britain and the beginning of the "modern legal history of witchcraft", repealing the earlier Witchcraft Acts which were originally based in an intolerance toward practitioners of magic but became mired in contested Christian doctrine and superstitious witch-phobia. Instead of assuming as the earlier laws did that witches were real and had real magical power derived from pacts with Satan, the new law assumed that there were no real witches, no one had real magic power and those claiming such powers were cheaters extorting money from gullible people.

The law was a reversion to the view of the primitive and the medieval Church, expressed from at least the 8th century, at the Council of Paderborn, but contested by witch-phobic Dominican Inquisitors beginning in the mid 15th century, with some success in forwarding a new doctrine among the popes, as seen in the papal bull Summis desiderantes affectibus (1484), but with far less success among the bishops. Thus the Witchcraft Act 1735 reflected the general trend in Europe, where after a peak around 1600, and a series of outbursts in the late 17th century, witch-trials quickly subsided after 1700. The last person executed for witchcraft in Great Britain was Janet Horne in 1727.

== History ==
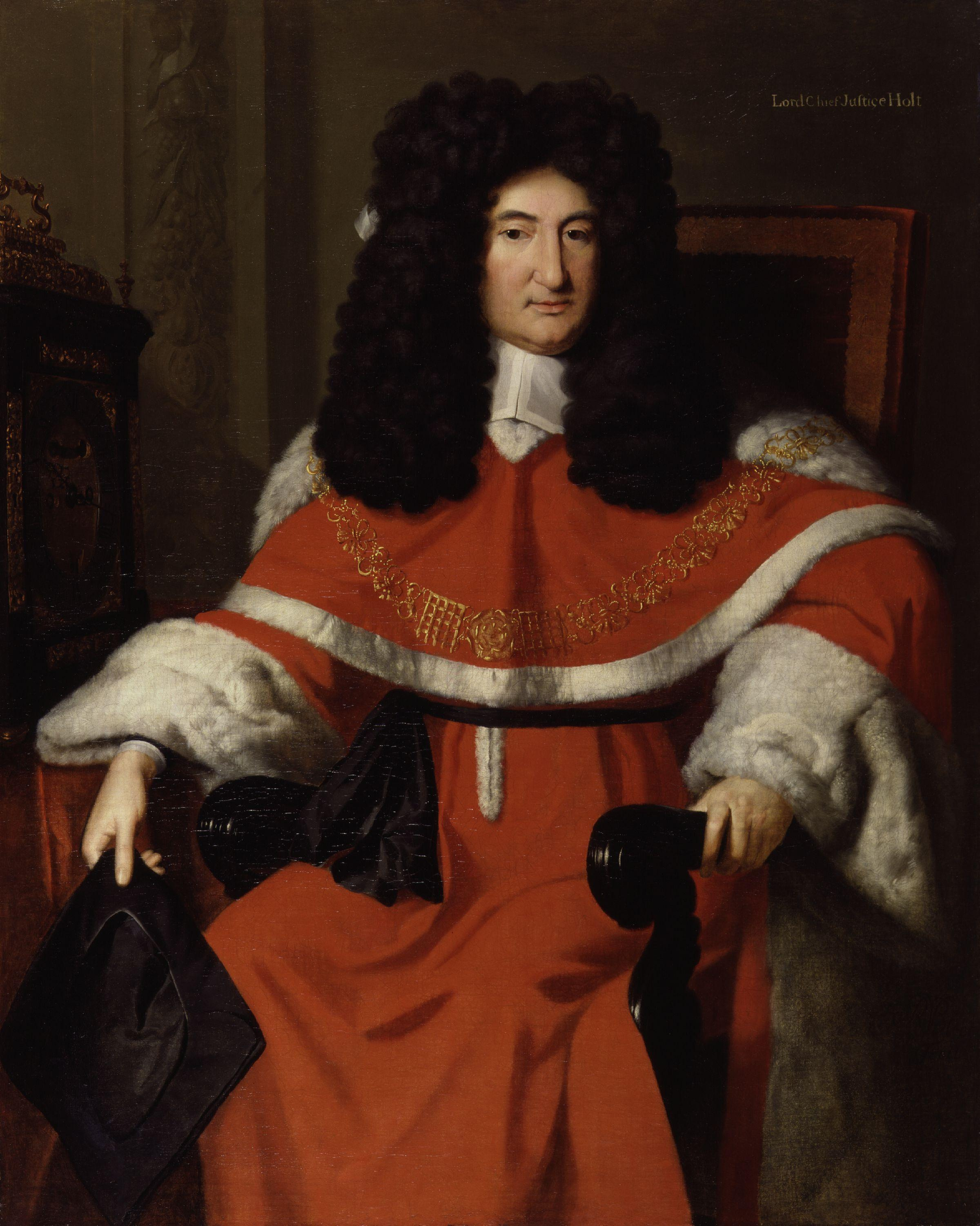
Lord Chief Justice of England Sir John Holt by Richard van Bleeck, c. 1700. Holt greatly influenced the end of prosecutions for witchcraft in England. National Portrait Gallery, London.

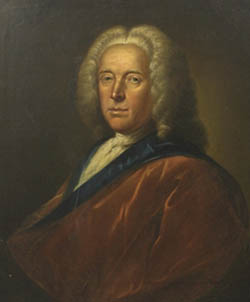
A portrait of James Erskine by William Aikman, painted in 1720. Erskine was the only Member of Parliament to voice significant opposition to the act.

Initially presented to the House of Commons on 27 January 1735/36 by John Conduitt, Sir John Crosse and George Heathcote, the act received royal assent on 24 March and came into effect on 24 June. In the words of Davies (1999), the new law meant that witchcraft was "no longer to be considered a criminal act, but rather an offence against the country's newly enlightened state". Up until 1772, it was illegal for the newspapers to report on parliamentary debates, meaning that there is a lack of archival material on the parliamentary debate on the implementation of the act. According to Davies, it appears that the act "generated only a modicum of debate" within Parliament, with several amendments being suggested in both the House of Commons and the House of Lords.

The only figure to offer significant opposition to the act was James Erskine, Lord Grange. Erskine not only fervently believed in the existence of witchcraft, but, it has been argued, also held beliefs that were deeply rooted in "Scottish political and religious considerations" and which caused him to reject the act. His objection to the act "marked him out as an eccentric verging on the insane" among Members of Parliament, and in turn his political opponents would use it against him; one of his staunchest critics, Robert Walpole, who was then the de facto prime minister of the country, allegedly stated that he no longer considered Erskine to be a serious political threat as a result of his embarrassing opposition to the act.

The act was frequently invoked in the early years of the 19th century in an attempt by the political elite to root out "ignorance, superstition, criminality and insurrection" among the general populace, and even more so under the Vagrancy Act 1824 (5 Geo. 4. c. 83), one purpose of which was to reinforce the 1735 act.

== Modern history ==
In September 1943, Helen Duncan was jailed under the act on the grounds that she had claimed to summon spirits. Her followers often contend that her imprisonment was in fact at the behest of superstitious military intelligence officers, who feared that she would reveal the secret plans for D-Day. She came to the attention of the authorities after supposedly contacting the spirit of a sailor of HMS Barham, whose sinking was hidden from the general public at the time. After being caught faking a spiritual manifestation, she was arrested during a seance and indicted with seven punishable counts: two of conspiracy to contravene the Witchcraft Act 1735, two of obtaining money by false pretences, and three of public mischief (a common law offence). She spent nine months in prison. Duncan has been frequently described as the last person to be convicted under the act.

Another candidate for the last person convicted under the act was Jane Rebecca Yorke of Forest Gate in east London. On 26 September 1944 at the Central Criminal Court, Yorke was convicted on seven counts of "pretending ... to cause the spirits of deceased persons to be present" and bound over.

The last threatened use of the act against a medium was in 1950.

The act was repealed with the enactment of the Fraudulent Mediums Act 1951, largely at the instigation of Spiritualists through the agency of Thomas Brooks MP.

The South African Witchcraft Suppression Act, 1957, which is still in force, was based on similar 19th-century laws in the Cape Colony which were themselves based on the Witchcraft Act 1735.

== Bibliography ==
- Beit-Hallahmi, Benjamin (1992). Despair and Deliverance: Private Salvation in Contemporary Israel. SUNY Press. ISBN 0-7914-0999-6.
- Cox, David J (2014). Crime in England 1688-1815. Routledge. ISBN 978-0-415-50183-5.
- Gibson, Marion (2006). Witchcraft and Society in England and America, 1550-1750. A&C Black. ISBN 0-8264-6142-5.
- Guiley, Rosemary (2008). Duncan, Helen (The Encyclopedia of Witches, Witchcraft and Wicca ed.). Infobase Publishing. ISBN 9781438126845.
- Newton, John; Bath, Jo (2008). Witchcraft and the Act of 1604. BRILL. ISBN 978-90-04-16528-1.
