= Jane Rebecca Yorke =

Jane Rebecca Yorke (27 January 1872 – 1953) was an English medium who was the last person convicted under the Witchcraft Act 1735.

== Biography ==
Yorke worked as a medium for many years from Forest Gate, Essex (now part of the London Borough of Newham). She was prosecuted by police in 1944 because of claims she was defrauding the public by exploiting wartime fears. During séances with Yorke, undercover police were told to ask about non-existent family members. Yorke provided elaborate details on them which she claimed had been provided by her spirit guide, such as telling an officer that his non-existent brother had been burned alive on a bombing mission. Yorke's alleged spirit guide was a Zulu, and she also frequently claimed to summon Queen Victoria. She was witnessed terrifying a hysterical woman who said she had seen the spirit of her dead brother, by warning her that her husband might also be killed. Yorke predicted that the Second World War would end in October 1944.

Yorke was arrested in July 1944. At her trial in September 1944 at London's Old Bailey, she was found guilty on seven counts against the Witchcraft Act 1735 of pretending "to cause the spirits of dead persons to be present." Yorke was fined £5 and placed on a good behaviour bond for three years, promising she would hold no more séances. The light sentence was due to her age of 72. She did not give any further séances.

Yorke's case demonstrated that, following the earlier trial of Helen Duncan, the Director of Public Prosecutions had decided that the Witchcraft Act 1735 was still useful in dealing with cases involving mediums. Although the Act was used as a threat in several subsequent cases, the last in 1950, this was the last in which someone was actually convicted under it.
