= Ricula =

Scientific classification
- Kingdom: Animalia
- Phylum: Arthropoda
- Class: Insecta
- Order: Lepidoptera
- Family: Tortricidae
- Subfamily: Olethreutinae
- Genus: Ricula; Heinrich, 1926

Genus of tortrix moths

Ricula is a genus of moths belonging to the family Tortricidae.

== Species ==
- Ricula dubitana Kuznetzov, 1992
- Ricula maculana (Fernald, 1901)

== See also ==
- List of Tortricidae genera
