= Witch smeller =

Social class of the Zulu people

Witch smellers (also known as omoriori) were important and powerful people, almost always women, amongst the Zulu and other Bantu-speaking peoples of Southern Africa, responsible for rooting out alleged evil witches in the area, and sometimes responsible for considerable bloodshed themselves. In present-day South Africa, their role has waned and their activities are illegal according to the Witchcraft Suppression Act, 1957.

== Work ==
If someone believes they are being bewitched, they must first contact a diviner, which contacts their ancestors, detects the misfortunes cast, and prescribes medicines. This job is known for being held by women. Diviners are also commonly seen working in public.

If it was determined that some misfortune which had befallen the area had been caused by a witch, the chief summoned his people to a great meeting, in which they all sat in a circle, sometimes for four or five days. The witch smellers then took their places in the center.

The witch smellers wore extravagant costumes, usually including animal skins and feathered headdresses, and face paint. Their hair was heavily greased, twisted in complicated designs, and frequently dyed bright red. They often carried assegais and shields, and also a quagga-tail switch, the symbol of their profession.

In the Gusii culture witch smellers were mainly responsible for extracting misfortunes caused by witches.

Witch Smellers are usually highly respected but do not gain much status within their society. They are seen as healers within their communities. They are most similar to, and sometimes confused with, people that have powers known as 'death dealer' that tend to promote fear.

== Ritual ==
Surrounded by a circle of women and girls who clapped their hands and droned a low, monotonous chant, the rhythm of which changed occasionally with the stamping of feet, the witch smellers proceeded to work themselves up into a frenzy. In this state, they spun, stalked and leapt, eventually touching one or more of the people with their switches, upon which the person was immediately dragged away and killed. All the living things in the accused witch's hut, human and animal, were also killed. Sometimes an entire kraal was exterminated in this way. Some used horns with dried sinuses of animals known for their sense of smell to find and irradicate the source.

== In fiction ==
A notable fictional account of witch smelling features in H. Rider Haggard's novel King Solomon's Mines, in which the loathsome and inhumanly ancient witch smeller Gagool is a principal villain.

In Robert A. Heinlein's science fantasy novella Magic, Inc., main protagonist Archie Fraser consults with Dr. Royce Worthington, an anthropologist and witch smeller in attempt to track down the cause of various strange events troubling his business.
