= Spotted Dog, Forest Gate =

Pub in Forest Gate, London

Spotted Dog
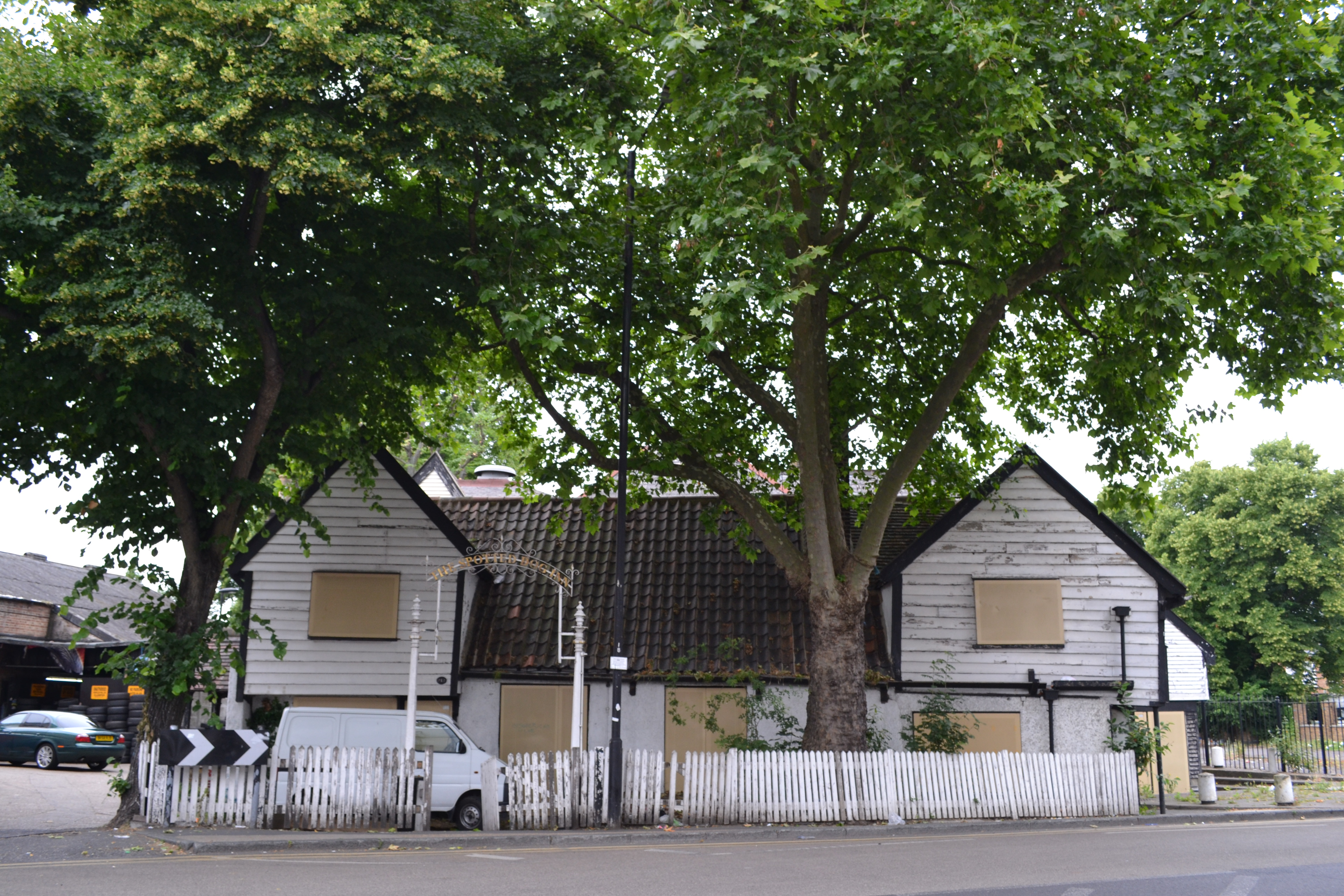
- Spotted Dog

- Location within London Borough of Newham Location within Greater London

General information
- Location: 212 Upton Lane, Forest Gate, London, England
- Coordinates: 51°32′31″N 0°01′23″E

Design and construction
- Designations

Listed Building – Grade II
- Official name: Spotted Dog Public House
- Designated: 25 September 1967
- Reference no.: 1191297

The Spotted Dog is a Grade II listed public house at 212 Upton Lane, Forest Gate, London. It dates back to the late 15th or early 16th century, and was thought to once have been a hunting lodge for King Henry VIII.

== History ==
Leopold Wagner's 1921 book A New Book About London writes of a "huge barn-like structure in the vegetable garden ... (of the pub) ... wantonly sacrificed by the new proprietors in the interest of a bottling store ... (which had) ... anciently enclosed the kennels for a pack of royal hounds". He asserts that when Henry VIII followed the chase in the Essex (Epping) Forest, he "took up the hounds here at Upton" about a mile from the toll-gate which subsequently led to the residential district being named Forest Gate.

Some credence can be attached to this tale because having dissolved Stratford Langthorne Abbey in 1538 and seized all of its enormous land holdings in the borough Henry Vlll used his own money to purchase the nearby Hamfrith Wood from its owner, Sir Anthony Hungerford – presumably to facilitate his love of hunting. Mr Wagner provides some intriguing details in support of his account stating that what became the Spotted Dog was at the time the residence of Henry's Master of the Hounds, who was granted the privilege of taking personal profit for refreshing travellers passing that way.

The author asserts that on this account that, until the Great War, the Spotted Dog "stood alone among the inns of the country at large in having its licence direct from the Crown," adding that:

Few historic hostelries ... have preserved their pristine freshness like Ye Olde Spotted Dog ... (its) ... picturesque, ivy-mantled wooden fabric ... appears very much today as when Daniel Defoe referred to it in his History of the Plague in London ... when ... (in 1665) ... those able to escape came to encamp in the fields round about, and again after the Great Fire the following year." In Mr Wagner's opinion, the Spotted Dog is "the most captivating 'house of call' in the environs of the Great City." He describes a large painting hanging on the west wall of the public bar bearing the arms of the City Corporation and the date of 1603, and constituting a "memorial of the meetings of merchant princes for eight years continuously while an earlier plague carried off thirty thousand souls". Corroboration of this part of Wagner's history is provided by Kenneth Lund, who describes the building as of considerable historical interest.

A plaque used to exist, showing the Arms of the City of London and the date 1603 ... to commemorate meetings which City merchants ... held in the pub during periods of plague.

== Development ==
The pub has been closed since June 2004, and is in a state of serious disrepair. In 2009, the London Fire Brigade posted a notice stating that it was a dangerous structure. In 2014, a campaign group called Save the Spotted Dog campaigned for the pub to be either reinstated as a family pub, or for it to be used for as some other sort of community facility; the group received support from local MPs and Newham Council. In 2020, the council approved plans to renovate the pub and build a 68-room hotel next door.

== See also ==
- The Old Spotted Dog Ground
