= Neopaganism in South Africa =

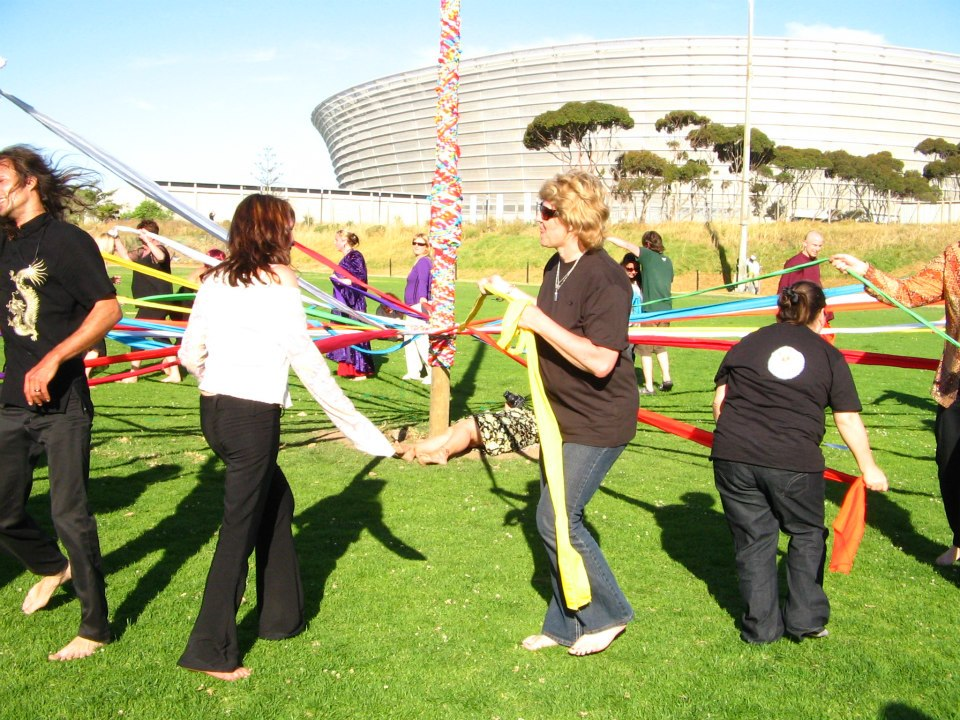
Maypole dancing at Beltaine Festival Cape Town 2010

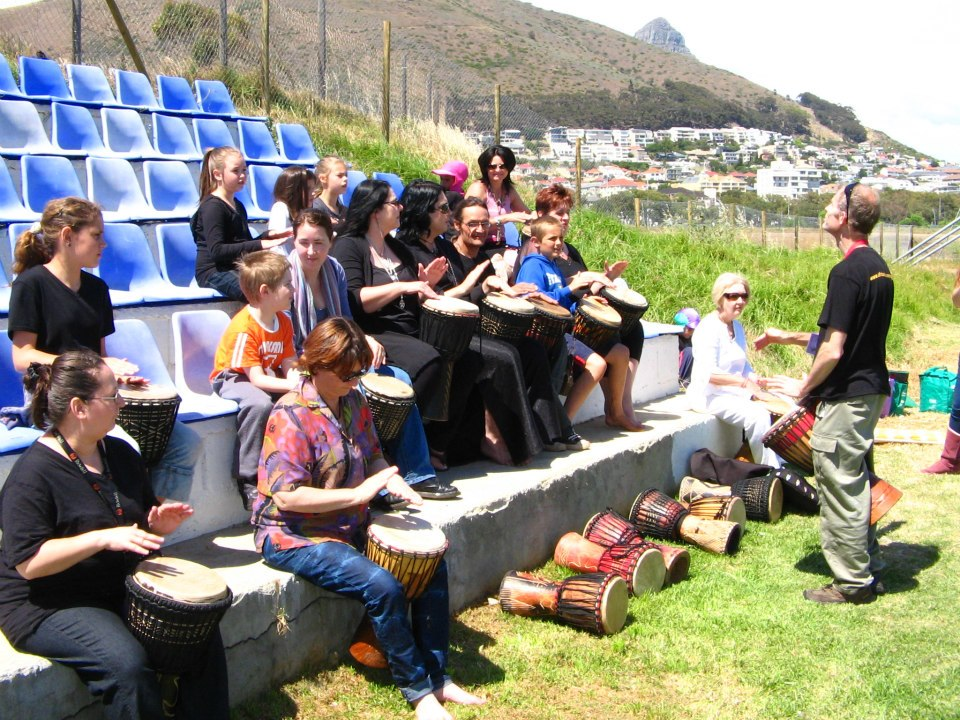
Drumming lessons at Beltaine Festival Cape Town 2010

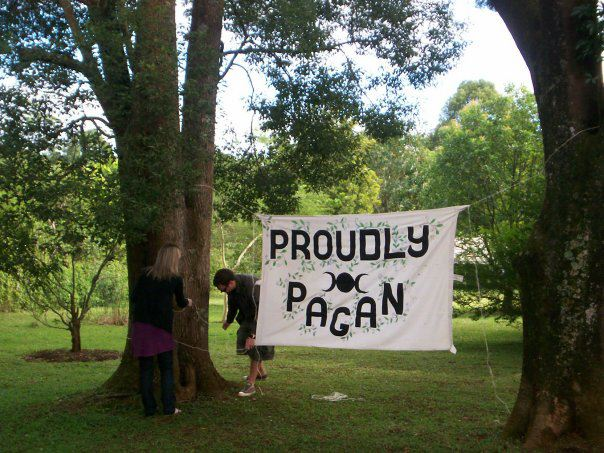
Pagan Freedom Day KwaZulu-Natal 2009

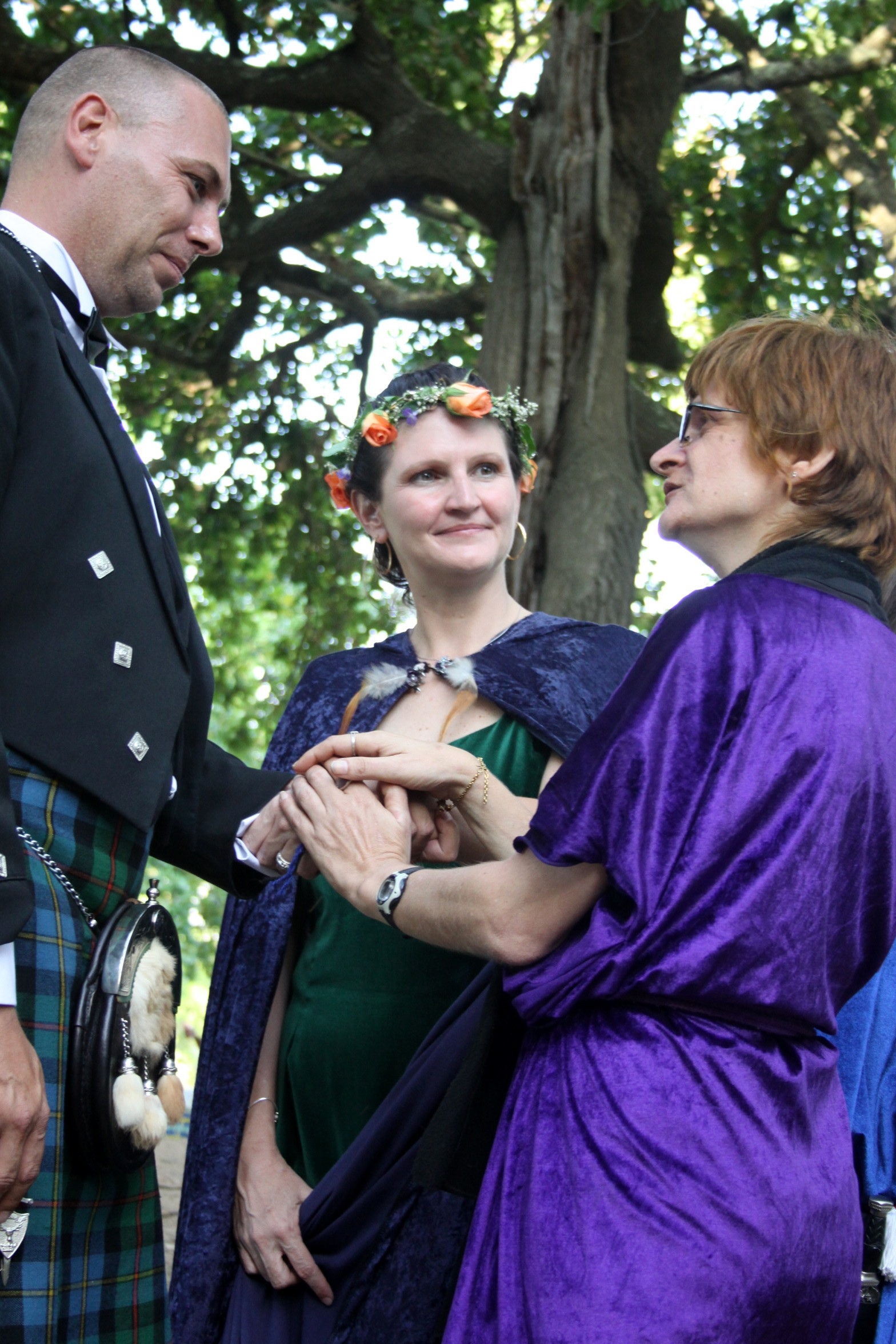
Handfasting Somerset West 2010

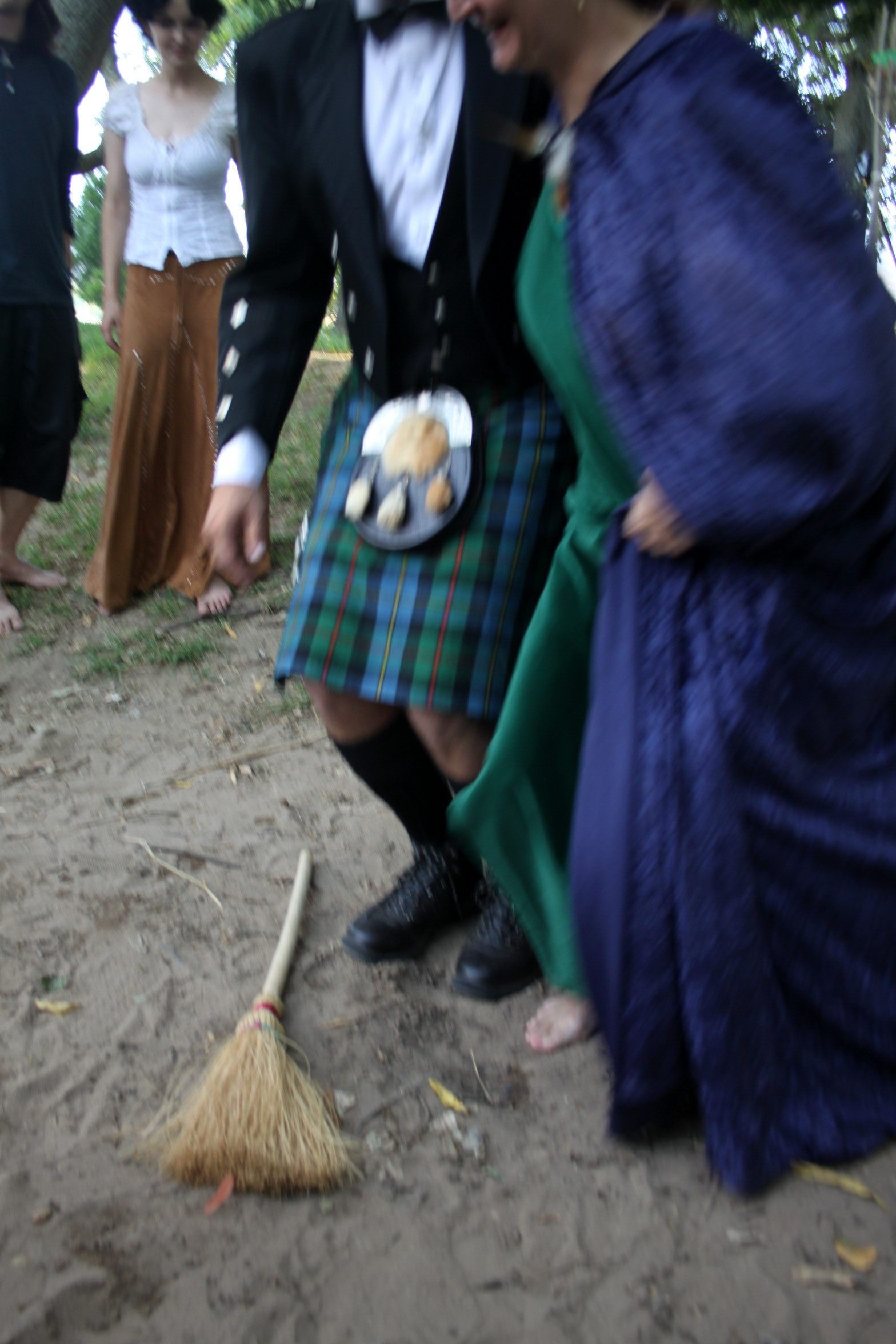
Jumping the broom Somerset West 2010

Neopaganism in South Africa is primarily represented by the traditions of Wicca, Neopagan witchcraft, Germanic neopaganism and Neo-Druidism. The movement is related to comparable trends in the United States and Western Europe and is mostly practiced by White South Africans of urban background; it is to be distinguished from folk healing and mythology in local Bantu culture.

While there are no official statistics, the movement has been described as "small but growing" as of 2004. Representatives of the movement have published claims of numbers of adherents ranging in the five digits as of 2008.

== History ==
South Africa's first democratic elections were held on 27 April 1994. The new Constitution provided for the right to freedom of religion, belief and opinion, paving the way for Paganism in South Africa. Early public activity included the first publication of Penton Pagan Magazine in December 1995, edited by Damon Leff, and the formation of the Pagan Federation of South Africa (PFSA) in June 1996, with Donna Vos elected as its first president. While the PFSA constitution took into account the principles of the UK-based Pagan Federation formed in 1971, it has never been affiliated with it, nor with the Pagan Federation International (PFI), which has been represented in South Africa since 2007.

== Beliefs and practices ==
South African Pagans actively participate in a diverse variety of groups or function primarily as solitary practitioners.

Pagan traditions practised in South Africa include Wicca, Neopagan witchcraft, Heathenry and Druidry. Wicca and contemporary Witchcraft are the predominant traditions practised and the majority of South African Pagans identify themselves as Wiccans or Witches in a contemporary sense.

While beliefs and practices vary, Donna Vos broadly defined Paganism as follows in an interview:

Paganism is simply a nature-based religious-spiritual system of beliefs and practices which recognises and acknowledges nature as a manifestation of divinity. Paganism is for those for whom diversity is a cause for celebration and not division.

— Alexandra Levin quoting Donna Vos, Out of this World: The Alternative South African Spiritual Experience (2003)

Professor Philip Harrison of Wits University's School of Architecture and Planning included an overview of Paganism in a series of specialised travel books:

Wallace (2006) outlined common beliefs and practices uniting South African Pagans:

Notwithstanding the fragmentation within the community, there exists a cognitive, although differentiated, understanding of certain features that unite South African Pagan individuals and groups. The most applicable of these features are,
– That Pagans recognize that the sacred is manifest in Nature and in the material world.
– That divinity is expressed in both masculine and feminine forms.
– A belief in the efficacy of magic as a means of connecting with the sacred for change and transformation.
– The celebration of the eight seasonal festivals and an emphasis on the lunar calendar.

— Dale Wallace, The Construction and Articulation of a Pagan Identity in South Africa (2006)

=== Terms of identification ===
South African Pagans experience prejudice and discrimination due to the use of misleading terms of identification and the narrow interpretation of certain terms by other members of society.

The capitalised terms of self-identification Pagan, Heathen, Witch and Witchcraft have been reappropriated by Neopagans worldwide, however historical negative stereotypes persist in the mainstream media and society in general. The colonial terms witch and witchcraft also have strong negative connotations in a traditional African context, relating to concepts such as evil and harmful magic, and are not terms generally used by practitioners of traditional African religion to identify themselves. Accusations of witchcraft can lead to violent witch-hunts and are therefore considered a criminal offence in South Africa under the Witchcraft Suppression Act of 1957.

Pagans do not generally believe in the concept of the Devil or identify themselves as Satanists.

The term occult, meaning hidden or secret, may be applied to Western esotericism practised by Pagans among others. The terms occult, occultism and occultist generally only have negative connotations in a Christian fundamentalist context.

== Festivals and holidays ==
South African Pagans celebrate the cycles and seasons of Nature throughout the year according to the Wheel of the Year based on Southern Hemisphere seasonal dates where applicable. The major seasonal festivals of the year known as sabbats are the winter solstice (in June), the first spring festival (1 August), the spring equinox (in September), the first summer festival (31 October), the summer solstice (in December), the first harvest festival (1 February), the autumnal equinox (in March) and the final harvest festival (30 April). Seasonal holidays do not coincide with the corresponding Christian holidays which originated in the Northern Hemisphere and absorbed the European pagan holidays based on Northern Hemisphere seasonal dates. The winter solstice is celebrated in June whereas Christmas is celebrated midsummer in December. The spring equinox is celebrated in September whereas Easter is celebrated in March/April. The final harvest festival is celebrated on 30 April whereas Halloween is celebrated on 31 October.

Since 2004 South African Pagans have also celebrated Pagan Freedom Day on Freedom Day, a public holiday celebrated on 27 April to commemorate South Africa's first democratic elections and the end of apartheid in 1994.

== Demographics ==
The majority of South African Pagans have European ancestry and live in urban areas.

There are no official statistics about South African Pagans. Historical Census statistics for religious denominations do not include an explicit count of Pagans and the Census 2011 form did not include any questions about religion due to low priority.

In 2003 then president of the Pagan Federation of South Africa Norman Geldenhuys stated there were approximately 50,000 Pagans in South Africa.

In 2008 Donna Vos stated there were an estimated 10,000 to 50,000 Pagans in South Africa.

== Legal status ==
The Civil Union Act, which came into effect on 30 November 2006, legalised same-sex marriage and also allowed for the legal designation of religious marriage officers without any religious restriction in accordance with the Constitution. Previously, religious marriage officers could only be legally designated as such "for the purpose of solemnizing marriages according to Christian, Jewish or Mohammedan rites or the rites of any Indian religion" in accordance with the Marriage Act. A Pagan wedding ceremony, also referred to as a handfasting, performed by someone other than a legally designated marriage officer could be legalised in a second civil ceremony although this option was restricted to opposite-sex couples prior to the implementation of the Civil Union Act.

In accordance with section 5 of the Civil Union Act, a Pagan organisation may apply to the Department of Home Affairs for designation as a religious organisation and when designated as such must formally nominate suitable candidates from within their organisation to be designated by the Department of Home Affairs as religious marriage officers for the purpose of solemnising marriages according to the rites of that religious organisation.

A Pagan organisation may also apply to the South African Revenue Service for registration as a tax-exempt public-benefit organisation (PBO) conducting public-benefit activities involving "religion, belief or philosophy".

The Witchcraft Suppression Act of 1957 based on colonial witchcraft legislation criminalises claiming a knowledge of witchcraft, conducting specified practices associated with witchcraft including the use of charms and divination, and accusing others of practising witchcraft. In 2007 the South African Law Reform Commission received submissions from the South African Pagan Rights Alliance and the Traditional Healers Organization requesting the investigation of the constitutionality of the act and on 23 March 2010 the Minister of Justice and Constitutional Development approved a South African Law Reform Commission project to review witchcraft legislation.

One of the SALRC's other new projects, the review of witchcraft legislation, will support the constitutional guarantee to freedom of religion, but will also serve to protect vulnerable groups. It is mostly women advanced in age that are persecuted as witches by communities holding traditional beliefs. These innocent victims are vulnerable to a double degree: as women and as older persons.

— South African Law Reform Commission Thirty Eighth Annual Report 2010/2011

=== Registered organisations ===
Pagan organisations which have been designated as religious organisations by the Department of Home Affairs in accordance with section 5 of the Civil Union Act include the South African Pagan Rights Alliance (SAPRA), the South African Pagan Council (SAPC), the Correllian Nativist Tradition South Africa (CNTSA) and the Circle of the African Moon (CAM).

The South African Pagan Council (SAPC) was also registered as a tax-exempt Public Benefit Organization (PBO) by the South African Revenue Service in 2008.

== Advocacy ==
Prior to the passing of the Civil Union Act in 2006, the Pagan Federation of South Africa (PFSA) formed in 1996, the South African Pagan Rights Alliance (SAPRA) formed by Damon Leff in 2004 and the Circle of the African Moon (CAM) formed by Donna Vos in 2001 lobbied for the reform of marriage legislation to bring it into line with the Constitution.

The South African Pagan Rights Alliance (SAPRA) is a faith-based human rights organisation which promotes the guaranteed liberties and freedoms enshrined for all South African Pagans in the Bill of Rights of the South African Constitution and assists South African Pagans whose constitutionally guaranteed rights and freedoms have been infringed due to unfair discrimination to obtain appropriate redress. Membership of SAPRA is restricted to South African citizens who identify as Pagans. SAPRA is an affiliated member of the South African Pagan Council (SAPC) formed in 2006 and represents the SAPC in matters relating to the defence and protection of the rights of South African Pagans.

In 2007 SAPRA and SAPC were represented by Lawyers for Human Rights, an independent human rights organisation, in their request to the South African Law Reform Commission for the review of witchcraft legislation on constitutional grounds.

Touchstone Advocacy is a SAPRA initiative launched in March 2008 advocating an end to witch-hunts globally, especially during the 30 days from 29 March to 27 April each year. The victims of these witch-hunts are generally vulnerable members of society who do not identify themselves as Witches or Pagans.

== See also ==
- Freedom of religion in South Africa
- Mpumalanga Witchcraft Suppression Bill
- Investigation of occult-related crimes by SAPS
