= Tagati =

Type of wizard who attempts to harm in secret, in South African English

In South African English, a tagati is a wizard, witch, or a spiteful person who operates in secret to harm others or who uses poisons and familiar spirits to carry out harmful deeds. The term is first recorded in 1836; it derives from the Zulu word umthakathi, being someone who mixes medicine. The word umthakathi (plural abathakathi) itself comes from two Zulu words thaka (mix) and muthi (medicine).

The term has gradually come to be used to refer only to negative, harmful uses of medicines derived from plants, animals and minerals.

== See also ==
- Sangoma
- Inyanga
