= List of schools in the London Borough of Newham =

This is a list of schools in the London Borough of Newham, England.

== State-funded schools ==
=== Primary schools ===
- Altmore Infant School
- Avenue Primary School
- Bobby Moore Academy
- Brampton Primary School
- Britannia Village Primary School
- Calverton Primary School
- Carpenters Primary School
- Central Park Primary School
- Chobham Academy
- Cleves Primary School
- Colegrave Primary School
- Curwen Primary School
- Dersingham Primary School
- Drew Primary School
- Earlham Primary School
- Ellen Wilkinson Primary School
- Elmhurst Primary School
- Essex Primary School
- Gainsborough Primary School
- Gallions Primary School
- Godwin Junior School
- Grange Primary School
- Hallsville Primary School
- Hartley Primary School
- Kaizen Primary School
- Keir Hardie Primary School
- Kensington Primary School
- Lathom Junior School
- Langdon Academy
- Manor Primary School
- Maryland Primary School
- Monega Primary School
- Nelson Primary School
- New City Primary School
- North Beckton Primary School
- Odessa Infant School
- Park Primary School
- Plaistow Primary School
- Portway Primary School
- Ranelagh Primary School
- Ravenscroft Primary School
- Roman Road Primary School
- Rosetta Primary School
- Royal Wharf Primary School
- School 21
- St Antony's RC Primary School
- St Edward's RC Primary School
- St Francis' RC Primary School
- St Helen's RC Primary School
- St James' CE Junior School
- St Joachim's RC Primary School
- St Luke's CE Primary School
- St Michael's RC Primary School
- St Stephen's Primary School
- St Winefride's RC Primary School
- Salisbury Primary School
- Sandringham Primary School
- School 360
- Scott Wilkie Primary School
- Selwyn Primary School
- Shaftesbury Primary School
- Sheringham Primary School
- Sir John Heron Primary School
- Southern Road Primary School
- Star Primary School
- Tollgate Primary School
- Upton Cross Primary School
- Vicarage Primary School
- West Ham CE Primary School
- William Davies Primary School
- Winsor Primary School
- Woodgrange Infant School

=== Secondary schools ===
- Bobby Moore Academy
- Brampton Manor Academy
- Chobham Academy
- Cumberland School
- Eastlea Community School
- Forest Gate Community School
- Harris Science Academy East London
- Kingsford Community School
- Langdon Academy
- Lister Community School
- Little Ilford School
- Oasis Academy Silvertown
- Plashet School
- Rokeby School
- Royal Docks Academy
- St Angela's Ursuline School
- St Bonaventure's RC School
- Sarah Bonnell School
- School 21
- Stratford School

=== Special and alternative schools ===
- Connaught Special School
- Education Links
- Eko Pathways
- John F Kennedy School
- New Directions
- Tunmarsh School

=== Further education ===
- London Academy of Excellence
- London Design and Engineering UTC
- Newham College of Further Education
- Newham Collegiate Sixth Form Centre
- Newham Sixth Form College

== Independent schools ==
=== Primary and preparatory schools ===
- Grangewood Independent School
- Jamiah Madaniyah Primary School
- UK Community College
- Zakariya Primary School

=== Senior and all-through school ===
- Azhar Academy Girls' School
- Hafs Academy
- Learningsure College
- Promised Land Academy
- Quwwat Ul Islam Girls' School

=== Special and alternative schools ===
- East London Independent School
