= Stratford City =

Coordinates: 51.545935°N 0.009248°W

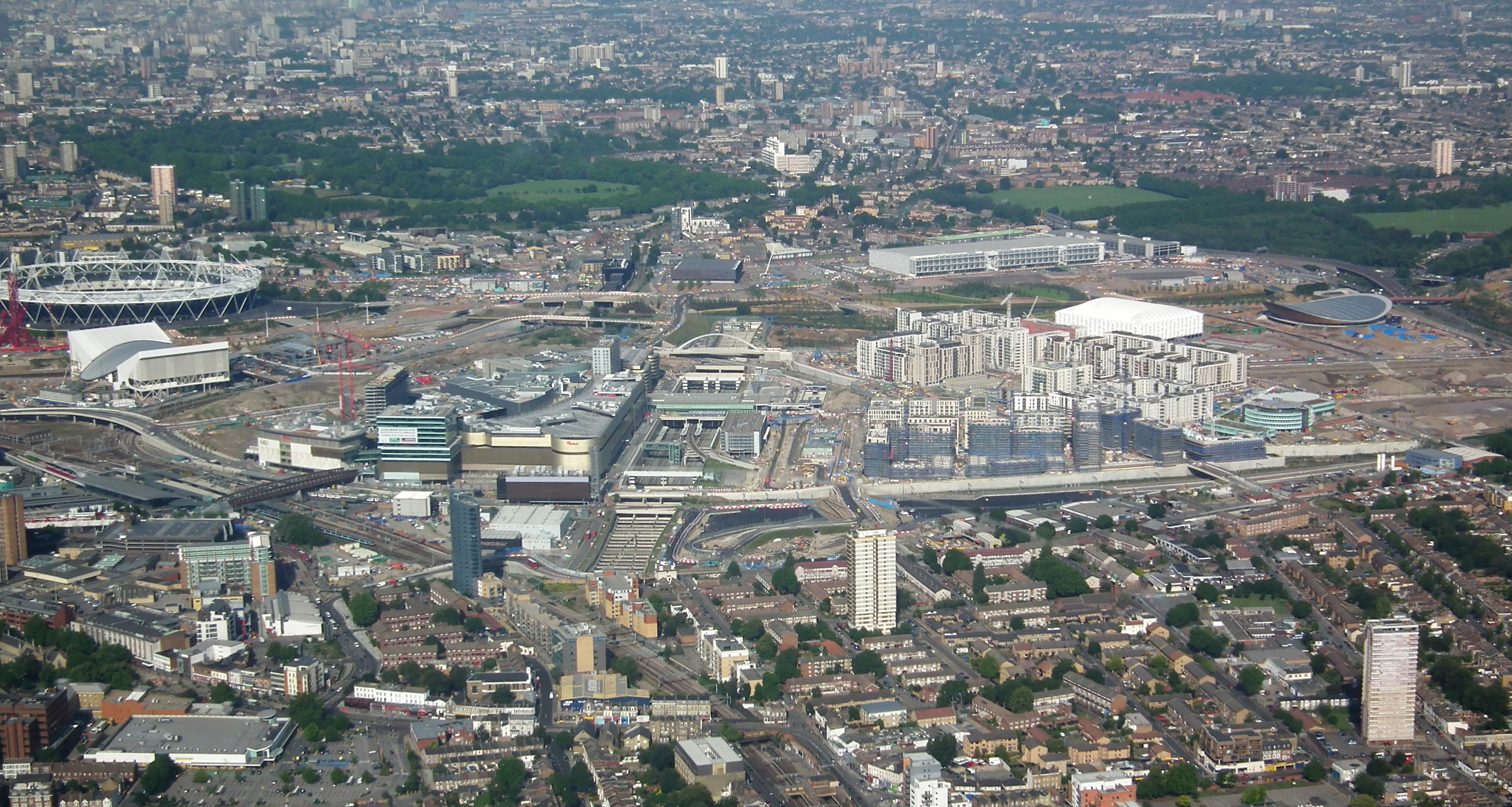
- Aerial view of Stratford City in June 2011

- Location within Greater London
- OS grid reference: TQ385845
  - Charing Cross: 6 mi (9.7 km) WSW
- London borough: Newham
- Ceremonial county: Greater London
- Region: London
- Country: England
- Sovereign state: United Kingdom
- Post town: LONDON
- Postcode district: E20
- Dialling code: 020
- Police: Metropolitan
- Fire: London
- Ambulance: London
- UK Parliament: Stratford and Bow
- London Assembly: City and East

Stratford City is a mixed-use development project in Stratford, London, England, to the north of Stratford town centre. The main developers are the Westfield Group and Lendlease.

Stratford City is the name given to the urban community centred on the Queen Elizabeth Olympic Park. Based on Stratford Regional and Stratford International railway stations, it includes Stratford Cross, a joint venture between Lendlease and London and Continental Railways (LCR) to create a £2 billion commercial and residential development, the Westfield shopping centre, Chobham Academy, and the East Village, previously the athletes' village constructed by Lendlease for the London 2012 Olympic and Paralympic Games.

Within Stratford City there is provision for 2,900,000-square-foot (270,000 m^{2}) of retail and leisure space, 1,300,000-square-foot (120,000 m^{2}) of hotel space, 6,600,000-square-foot (610,000 m^{2}) of commercial district space, 16,400 new homes, 180,000-square-foot (17,000 m^{2}) of community facilities, and two energy centres capable of providing 75% of the sites' energy needs. Royal Mail has allocated the postcode E20 to Stratford City and the Queen Elizabeth Olympic Park.

== Planning ==
The whole Queen Elizabeth II Olympic Park site was proposed to be secured under a compulsory purchase order (CPO) by the London Development Agency. In late 2005, a row broke out between then Mayor of London Ken Livingstone and Newham Council/Westfield over the use of the legal instrument. The site for the Olympic Village was to be located next to the £4 billion development of Stratford City, but access difficulties meant that the Olympic Park CPO extended onto the site for Stratford City. In November 2005, an agreement was made whereby the CPO over the Westfield site was removed, subject to agreed access provisions to the Olympic Village.

The Olympic Village, home of the athletes during the 2012 Summer Games and was built as part of Lend Lease, would be redeveloped at the new East Village urban development as part of the legacy project.

== Construction ==
Work started in early 2007, and the entire project was completed in 2012. Work was carried out in phases, with Phase 1 completed in 2011. Phase 1 includes 1.9 million ft^{2} (150,000 m^{2}) of retail and leisure space (see Westfield Stratford City), a 267-room Premier Inn hotel, 1.1m ft^{2} of office space, and 4,850 new homes. The office space comprises a cluster of four tall office buildings: Stratford Place, at 130,000 ft^{2}; The Square, at 200,000 ft^{2}; First Avenue, at over 560,000 ft^{2}; and Station Square, at 95,000 ft^{2}.

== Transport ==
The site is adjacent to both the existing Stratford Regional station and the new Stratford International station. Stratford Regional station is served by London Overground, Docklands Light Railway, London Underground Central and Jubilee lines, National Rail services, and the Elizabeth line. Stratford International station is served by Southeastern domestic services on High Speed 1 and Docklands Light Railway services to London City Airport, Beckton and Woolwich Arsenal. Currently, no international services call at Stratford International. A pedestrian bridge connects the development to the existing Stratford town centre.
