= Tolu Bally =

Nigerian fashion designer

- Born: 2 October 1990 (age 36)
- Education: Newham College University of East London
- Occupation: fashion designer
- Known for: 2207bytbally
- Children: 1

Tolulope Bally (born 2 October 1990) professionally known as Tolu Bally is a Nigerian executive, businesswoman and fashion entrepreneur. She is the founder and creative director of 2207bytbally, a Nigerian fashion brand specialized in female couture.

== Biography ==
Tolulope was born on 2 October 1988 to the family of Mr & Mrs. Bally as the last child of 13. She is of Nupe and Yoruba origin from Ondo State, Nigeria. She attended Newham College, England before proceeding to the University of East London, England where she graduated with a bachelor's degree in Psychosocial Studies.

== Career ==
Bally moved to London, United Kingdom to further her education. While in London, she sold clothes from her car booth and soon discovered her love for fashion. With time, she moved back to Nigeria to fully pursue her fashion ambitions. Upon arrival in Nigeria, she opened her own fashion store in Lagos but eventually closed it due to inflation.

On 1 November 2016, she officially started her fashion career. She named her fashion label "2207bytbally", a brand that focuses on women's couture. Her couture brand label was named after her son's birthdate 22 July.

== Personal life ==
Bally gave birth to her son, King Oba Nathan on 22 July 2014.

== Awards and honours ==
In 2020, she won the ELOY Awards for Innovative Fashion Brand of the year. That same year, she was named the Fashion Icon of the year by La Mode mlagazine. In 2022, she won the Net Honours award for Most Popular Designer of the year. She also won the Icon Touch Awards for Entrepreneur of the year, 2022.

== Filmography ==
=== Music videos ===
Year	Title	Performer(s)
2021	"Paloma"	Mr. P, Singah
