= Westfield Stratford City =

Coordinates: 51.545935°N 0.009248°W

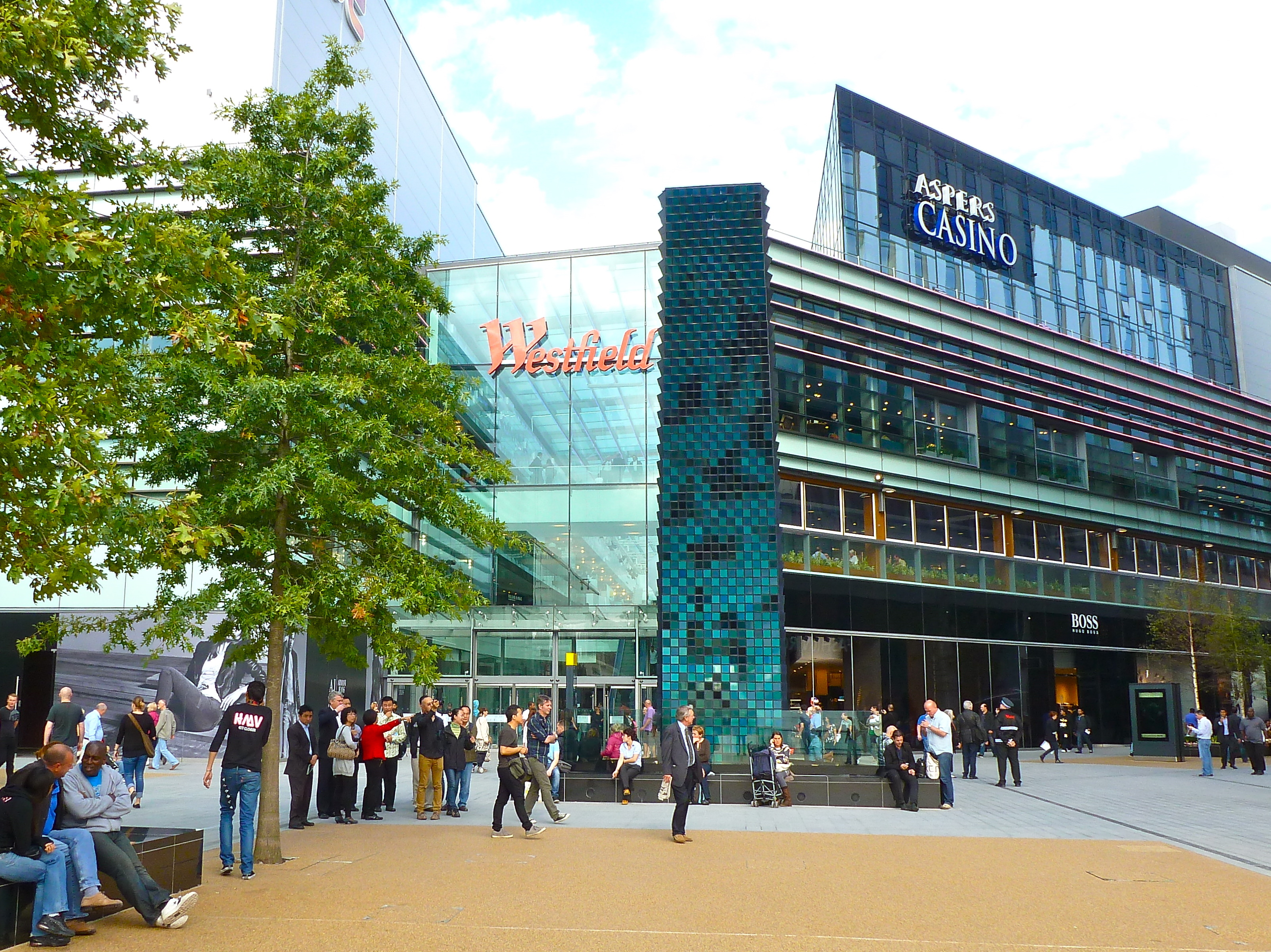
- Location: Stratford, London, England, United Kingdom
- Opened: 13 September 2011; 15 years ago
- Manager: Unibail-Rodamco-Westfield
- Owner: Dory co. (50%); ABP Pension Fund (25%); CPP Investment Board (25%)
- Num. of stores: 350
- Num. of anchor tenants: 3 (Marks & Spencer, John Lewis & Waitrose)
- Floor area: 175,000 square metres (1,880,000 sq ft)
- Floors: 3 (some shops have extra floors)
- Parking: 5,000
- Public transit: Stratford; Stratford International
- Website: westfield.com/stratfordcity

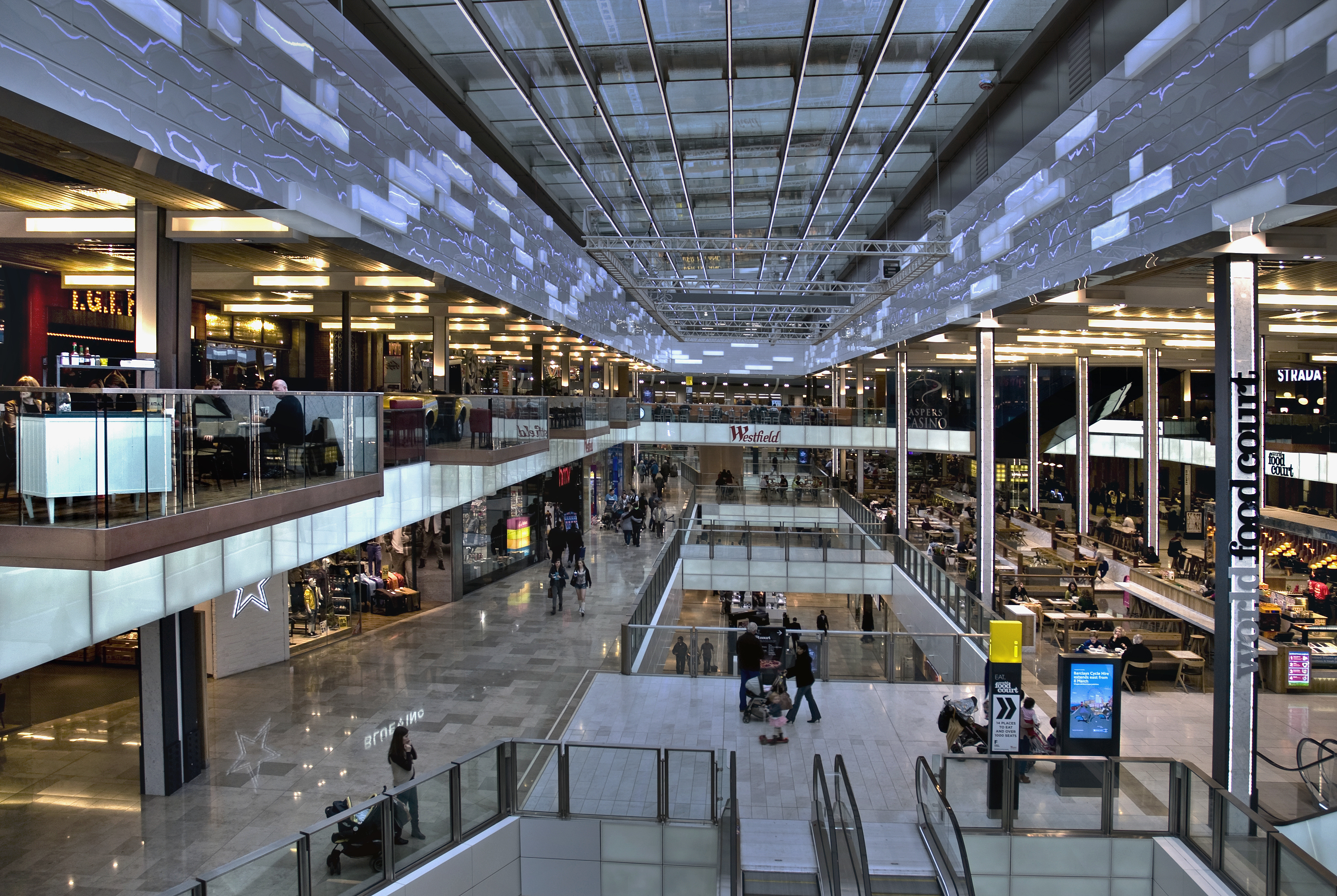
Interior of Westfield Stratford City, viewed from the 2nd floor

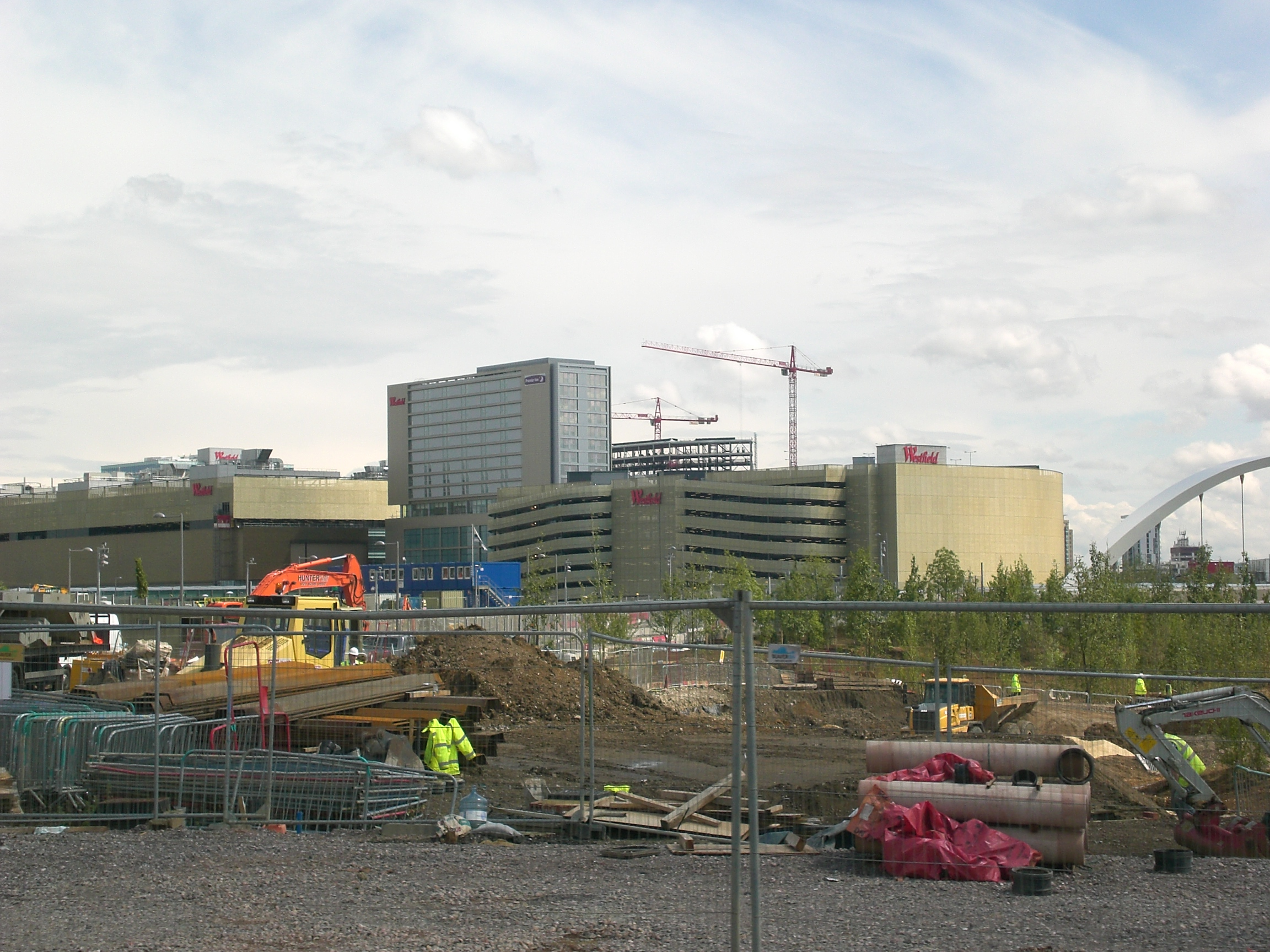
Construction in June 2011 at ground level

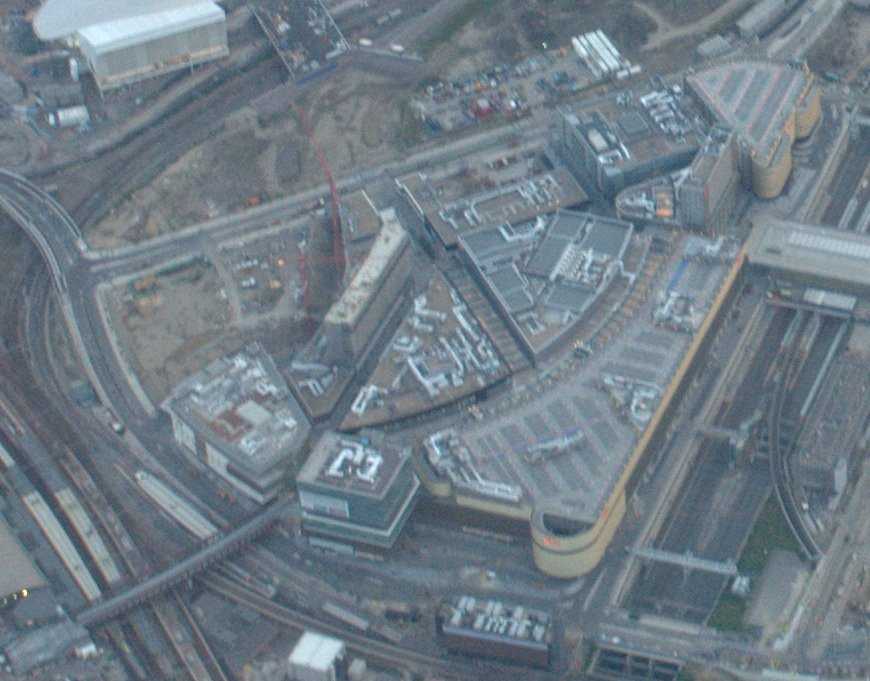
Aerial view of June 2011 construction

Westfield Stratford City is a shopping centre in Stratford, East London, which opened on 13 September 2011. With a total retail floor area of 1,910,000 square feet (177,000 m^{2}), it is the largest urban shopping centre in the UK by land area and the 4th-largest shopping centre in the UK by retail space, behind Westfield London (White City), the MetroCentre, and the Trafford Centre.

Originally fully owned by the Westfield Group, in November 2010 ABP Pension Fund and CPP Investment Board each purchased a 25% shareholding, with Westfield retaining 50%. Westfield's holding is now owned by Unibail-Rodamco-Westfield following Unibail-Rodamco's acquisition of Westfield Corporation in 2018.

Westfield Stratford City is adjacent to the London Olympic Park, Stratford Cross, East Village, Stratford station and Stratford International station. The shopping centre is part of a large multi-purpose development project called Stratford City. It was promoted as contributing significantly to the local economy, with the creation of up to 10,000 permanent jobs including 2,001 going to local people. However, there are counter-reports of significant harm to other local businesses due to the preponderance of chain stores.

The site was formerly occupied by Stratford Works and Locomotive Depot.

== Retail area ==
The shopping centre is anchored by a 240,000 sq ft (22,000 m^{2}) John Lewis department store, a 32,000 sq ft (3,000 m^{2}) Waitrose supermarket, a 136,000 sq ft (12,600 m^{2}) Marks & Spencer department store, a 24-hour casino (Aspers) and a 20 screen all-digital Vue cinema. The shopping centre also has a 267-room Premier Inn hotel, a Holiday Inn with 350 rooms and Staybridge Suites. The shopping centre has approximately 280 stores and 70 restaurants.

== Transport ==
To the south of the site lies Stratford station which is served by London Underground's Central and Jubilee lines, Greater Anglia, Elizabeth line, London Overground, Docklands Light Railway, and a number of c2c services. To the north lies Stratford International station, which is served by Southeastern High Speed and Docklands Light Railway services.

Stratford bus station and Stratford City bus station are served by numerous London Buses routes and National Express and Terravision long-distance services.

According to Westfield, while the site supports a 5,000 space car park, 80% of the shoppers arrive at the centre on public transport.

== In popular culture ==
In 13 September 2011, Nicole Scherzinger marked the opening of Westfield Stratford City with a performance.

In January 2012, The X Factor singer Olly Murs filmed a music video for his single "Oh My Goodness" at Westfield Stratford City.

== Incidents ==
On 1 March 2025, footage circulated on social media showing a teenager throwing a 15 kg seat from a balcony 50 feet above the ground at Westfield Stratford City. The incident, filmed by another teenager, narrowly missed shoppers below. In September 2025, the boy who threw the seat was sentenced to an eight-month detention and training order after admitting criminal damage and recklessly causing a public nuisance.

On 26 December 2025, Boxing Day, around 100 pro-Palestinian protesters gathered at Westfield Stratford City, disrupting shoppers during one of the busiest shopping days of the year. Footage shared on social media showed demonstrators draping a large Palestinian flag over the centre's railings before chanting through megaphones, while Metropolitan Police officers and shopping centre security helped disperse the protesters.

== See also ==
- Westfield London
