= School 21 =

Oasis School 21

Location
- Pitchford Street, Stratford, E15 4RZ; 51.5383°N 0.0019°E

Information
- School type: All-through comprehensive free school
- Religious affiliation: Non-denominational
- Established: 1 September 2012
- Local authority: Newham London Borough Council
- Trust: Big Education Trust
- Specialist: English language
- Department for Education URN: 138196 Tables
- Ofsted: Reports
- Head teacher: Moray Dickson
- Gender: Mixed-gender
- Age: 4 to 18
- Enrollment: 1,236 (2023)
- Capacity: 1,200
- Website: school21.org.uk

Oasis School 21 is a mixed-gender all-through school and sixth form with free school status in Stratford in the London Borough of Newham, England. The school is a non-selective school for pupils between the ages of 4 and 18 and a specialist school for the English language. It was founded in 2012 by Peter Hyman, a former special adviser to Prime Minister Tony Blair.

== Background ==
Oasis School 21 was co-founded by Ed Fidoe, an educational consultant and ex-theatrical producer, Oli de Botton, a teacher and ex-consultant, and Peter Hyman, an ex-speechwriter and special adviser to Prime Minister Tony Blair and the former deputy head teacher of Greenford High School in Southall. In 2011, they applied to the government to set up a free school in Newham called Newham School 21 (Note: The name of the school as originally proposed was Newham School 21. "Newham" had been dropped from the name by January 2012, which was after it had been approved for opening.) in September 2012. It would be a non-selective and non-denominational mixed-gender all-through school taking students between the ages of 4 and 18 with a maximum capacity of 1,200 students. It would also be a specialist school for the English language. By January 2012, the school had been approved by the government to open in Stratford, Newham in September 2012.

Oasis School 21 opened on 1 September 2012 in a temporary building at Rokeby Street, Stratford before moving to its current site at Pitchford Street, Stratford in September 2013. It is a mixed-gender all-through school and sixth form with free school status; it is the first free school in Newham to provide a secondary school education. The school is non-selective and is not affiliated with any religious faith. It has been part of the Big Education Trust (Note: Stylised in all capitals (BIG EDUCATION TRUST)) (known as the School 21 Trust until 2018) since 1 September 2012. The trust has two other schools, School 360 and Surrey Square Primary School, which are both primary schools with free school status.

== Curriculum ==
Oasis School 21 is a free school. Free schools are exempt from the National Curriculum for England, though they must still teach a "broad and balanced" curriculum that includes Relationship and Sex Education, religious education, and the subjects of English, maths, and science. Oasis School 21 is a specialist school for the English language. It is named after its curriculum, which co-founder Peter Hyman has said "prepares students for the 21st century". The school's ethos and curriculum is built around developing six attributes in its students for success in the 21st century. They are eloquence, expertise, grit, spark, craftmanship and professionalism. The school tries to develop these attributes by focusing on coaching and oracy. Coaching, with regular school assemblies, is used to teach subject content to students. It is also used to teach students how to become eloquent speakers and to teach them professionalism. Oracy is central to the curriculum, and the school has developed a framework for the subject with the University of Cambridge. The school intends for oracy to be at an equal level with literacy. Students are encouraged to speak in and outside of lessons, and students aged 8 and above deliver speeches to an audience in the style of TED Talks. By Year 7, all students perform a five-minute speech without notes to an audience of parents, teachers and other students at the end of the school year.

The curriculum is also based on the idea that a new approach toward pedagogy and the standardised curriculum is needed to prepare the youth for adulthood. Peter Hyman has argued that an engaged education has to include the engagement of the head (an "academic education"), the heart (a "character education") and the hand (a "can-do education"). Education at Oasis School 21 is split between activities for the head, the heart and the hand. Activities for the head are meant to encourage academic success, activities for the heart are meant to encourage the development of well-being and the individual, and activities for the hand are meant to encourage problem solving and brainstorming.

The school does not follow a usual schedule of periods where a single teacher teaches classes of 30 students, but instead combines lectures, classes, one-on-one coaching sessions and seminars, and there are also free periods for students in the secondary school phase. Groups of students can vary from 12 students at the seminars to 50 students at the lectures. The school also frequently uses the Harkness method of teaching. Class sizes are capped at 25 students so that students can spend more time with their tutors while year groups are capped at 75 students. Students sit in circles at all times when seated, and classes have to make a public exhibition every term; the second policy was taken from the High Tech High charter schools in California, United States. Exhibitions at the school have replaced parent's evenings. In these exhibitions, students can show people their school work, discuss their education, and take questions about the school's curriculum.

In England, students take standard assessment tests (SATs) at the end of primary school and General Certificate of Secondary Education (GCSE) exams at the end of secondary school. The first students at Oasis School 21 sat their GCSE exams in 2017. The first SATs results for School 21 were published in 2018. Alongside GCSE qualifications in maths, science, and English, which are compulsory, students can choose which GCSE qualifications they wish to study. In the 2021/2022 academic year, students at School 21 took GCSEs in art and design, biology, chemistry, computer studies, drama and theatre studies, English language, English literature, geography, history, mathematics, music, physical education, physics, Polish, Double Award Science, and Spanish. Students also took technical awards in hospitality, general music studies, and speech and drama.
