= King Edward VII, Stratford =

Pub in Stratford, London

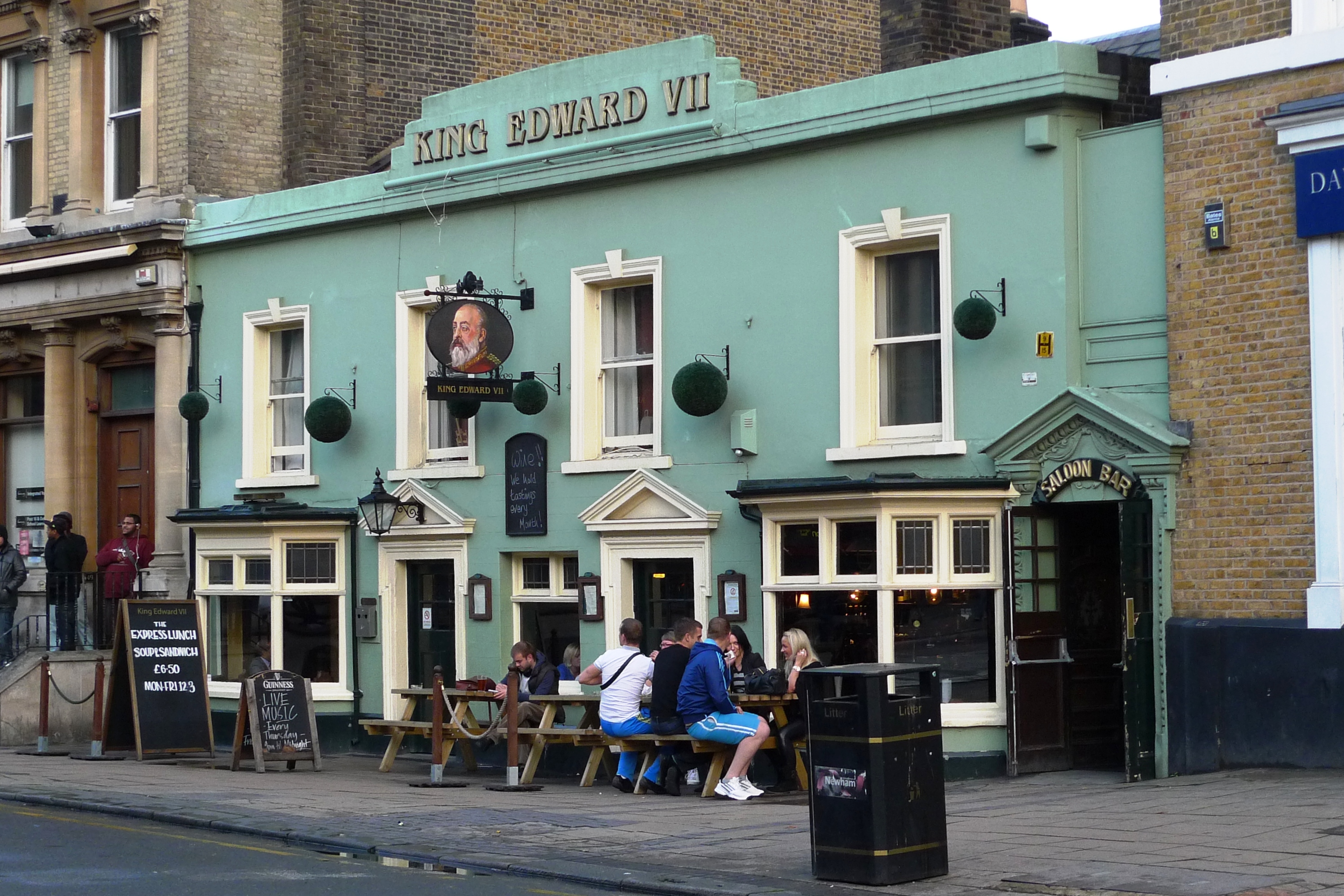
- King Edward VII, Stratford

- Location within London Borough of Newham Location within Greater London

General information
- Location: 47 Broadway, Stratford, London, England
- Coordinates: 51°32′28″N 0°00′10″E

Design and construction
- Designations

Listed Building – Grade II
- Official name: King Edward VII Public House
- Designated: 8 June 1978
- Reference no.: 1190785

The King Edward VII is a Grade II listed former public house at 47 Broadway, Stratford, London. It was on CAMRA's list of historic pub interiors. The pub closed in late 2025. The pub reopened after major renovation in September 2026.

It was built in the early 18th century opposite St John's Church and has original pedimented doors and early 19th-century bay windows. It was originally called "The King of Prussia", either in honour of Frederick the Great or else after King Frederick William IV, who visited the area in 1842 to meet Elizabeth Fry, the prison reformer. However, the name was changed at the start of World War I in 1914 for patriotic reasons.
