= Stratford, London =

Town in London, England

Coordinates: 51.5423°N 0.00256°W

Stratford
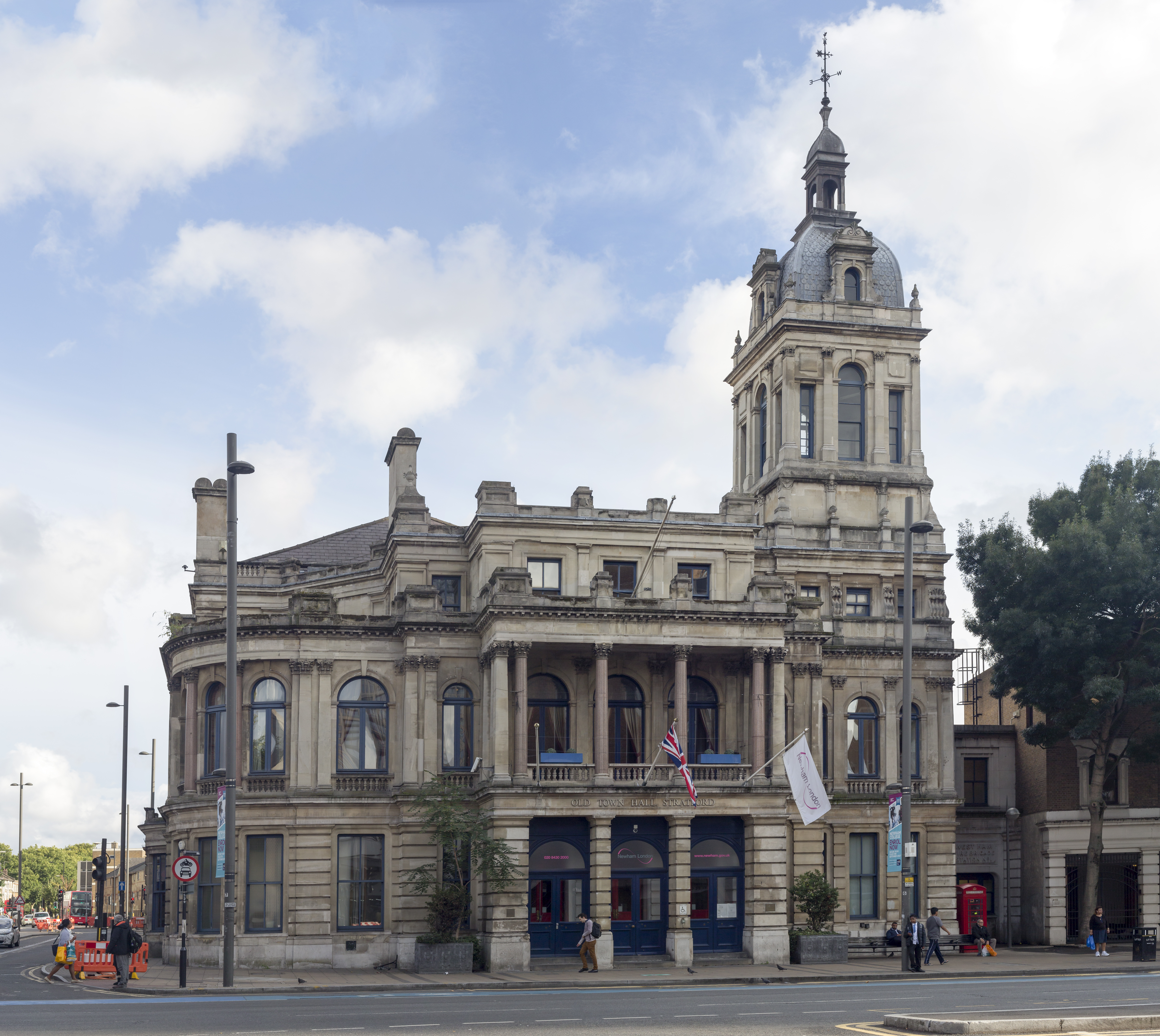
- Stratford Town Hall, Stratford

- Location within Greater London
- Population: 36,666 (2019 estimate, Stratford and New Town ward)
- OS grid reference: TQ385845
  - Charing Cross: 6 mi (9.7 km) WSW
- London borough: Newham
- Ceremonial county: Greater London
- Region: London
- Country: England
- Sovereign state: United Kingdom
- Post town: LONDON
- Postcode district: E15, E20
- Dialling code: 020
- Police: Metropolitan
- Fire: London
- Ambulance: London
- UK Parliament: Stratford and Bow
- London Assembly: City and East

Stratford is a town and district of East London, England, in the London Borough of Newham. Part of the Lower Lea Valley, it is six miles (ten kilometres) northeast of Charing Cross, and includes Maryland and East Village.

Historically, part of the ancient parish of West Ham in the hundred of Becontree in Essex, Stratford later became part of the County Borough of West Ham and the location of its Town Hall. Following reform of local government in London in 1965 it became part of the borough of Newham in the newly formed Greater London.

Stratford grew rapidly in the 19th century after the railway came to the area in 1839, forming part of the conurbation of London, similar to much of south-west Essex. The late 20th century was a period of severe economic decline in the area, eventually reversed by ongoing regeneration associated with the 2012 Summer Olympics, for which Stratford's Queen Elizabeth Olympic Park, part of the large, multi-purpose Stratford City development, was the principal venue. The Westfield Stratford City shopping centre, one of the largest urban shopping centres in Europe, opened in 2011. Stratford is east London's primary retail, cultural and leisure centre, and has also become the second most significant business location in east London after Canary Wharf.

== History ==
Stratford's early significance was due to a Roman road (later known as the Great Essex Road) running from Aldgate in the City, across the River Lea, to Romford, Chelmsford and Colchester. At that time the various branches of the river were tidal and without channels, while the marshes surrounding them had yet to be drained. The Lea Valley formed a natural boundary between Essex on the eastern bank and Middlesex on the west, and was a formidable obstacle to overland trade and travel.

=== Original ford and place name origin ===
The name is first recorded in 1067 as Strætforda and means 'ford on a Roman road'. It is formed from Old English 'stræt' (in modern English 'street') and 'ford'. The former river crossing lay at an uncertain location north of Stratford High Street.

The district of Old Ford in northern Bow – west of the Lea – is named after the former crossing, while Bow itself was also initially named Stratford, after the same ford, and a variety of suffixes were used to distinguish the two distinct settlements, including Stratford-le-Bow.

The settlement to the east of the Lea was also known as Estratford (recorded in 1291), referring to the location east of the other Stratford, Statford Hamme (recorded in 1312) alluding to the location within the parish of West Ham, Abbei Stratford, referring to the presence of Stratford Langthorne Abbey, and Stretford Langthorne (recorded in 1366) after a distinctive thorn tree (possibly a pollarded Hawthorn) which stood in the area. The thorn tree itself, was mentioned much earlier, in a charter of the Manor of Ham, in 958 AD. The tree is thought to have stood in the vicinity of the modern Channel Sea rail junction, around 200 metres north-north-west of the London Aquatics Centre.

=== Bow Bridge ===
In 1110 Matilda, wife of Henry I, ordered a distinctively bow-shaped (arched) bridge to be built over the River Lea, together with a causeway across the marshes along the line now occupied by Stratford High Street. Reports state she (or her retinue) encountered problems crossing the river to get to Barking Abbey.

The western Stratford then become suffixed by "-atte-Bow" (at the Bow), eventually became known simply as Bow, while over time the eastern Stratford lost its "Langthorne" suffix.

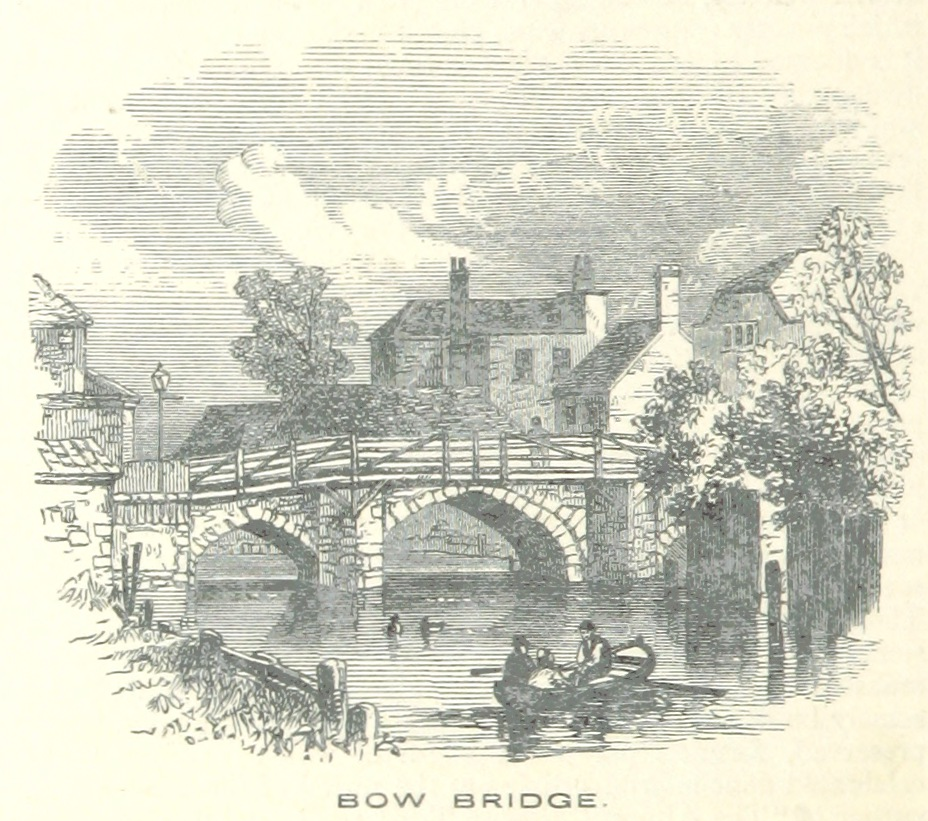
Bow Bridge depicted in 1851

The bridge was repaired and upgraded many times over the centuries until eventually demolished and replaced in the 19th century.

=== Stratford Langthorne Abbey ===
In 1135 the Cistercian Order founded Stratford Langthorne Abbey, also known as West Ham Abbey. This became one of the largest and most wealthy monasteries in England, owning 1,500 acres (610 hectares) in the immediate area and 20 manors throughout Essex.

The Abbey lay between the Channelsea River and Marsh Lane (Manor Road). Nothing visible remains on the site, as after its dissolution by Henry VIII in 1538, local landowners took away much of the stone for their own buildings and the land was subsequently urbanised.

A stone window and a carving featuring skulls – thought to have been over the door to the charnel house – remain in All Saints Church, West Ham (dating from about 1180). The Great Gate of the abbey survived in Baker's Row until 1825.

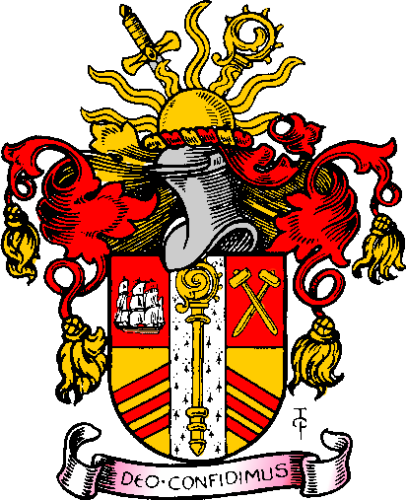
Arms of the County Borough of West Ham

The doorway to the Old Court House, in Tramway Avenue (Stratford), displays the Abbey's coat of arms. The chevrons from this device, originally from the arms of the Mountfitchet family, together with an abbot's crozier were incorporated into the arms of the former County Borough of West Ham in 1887. The new London Borough of Newham adopted the same arms in 1965.

=== Industrialisation ===
The industrialisation of Stratford started slowly and accelerated rapidly in the early Victorian era.

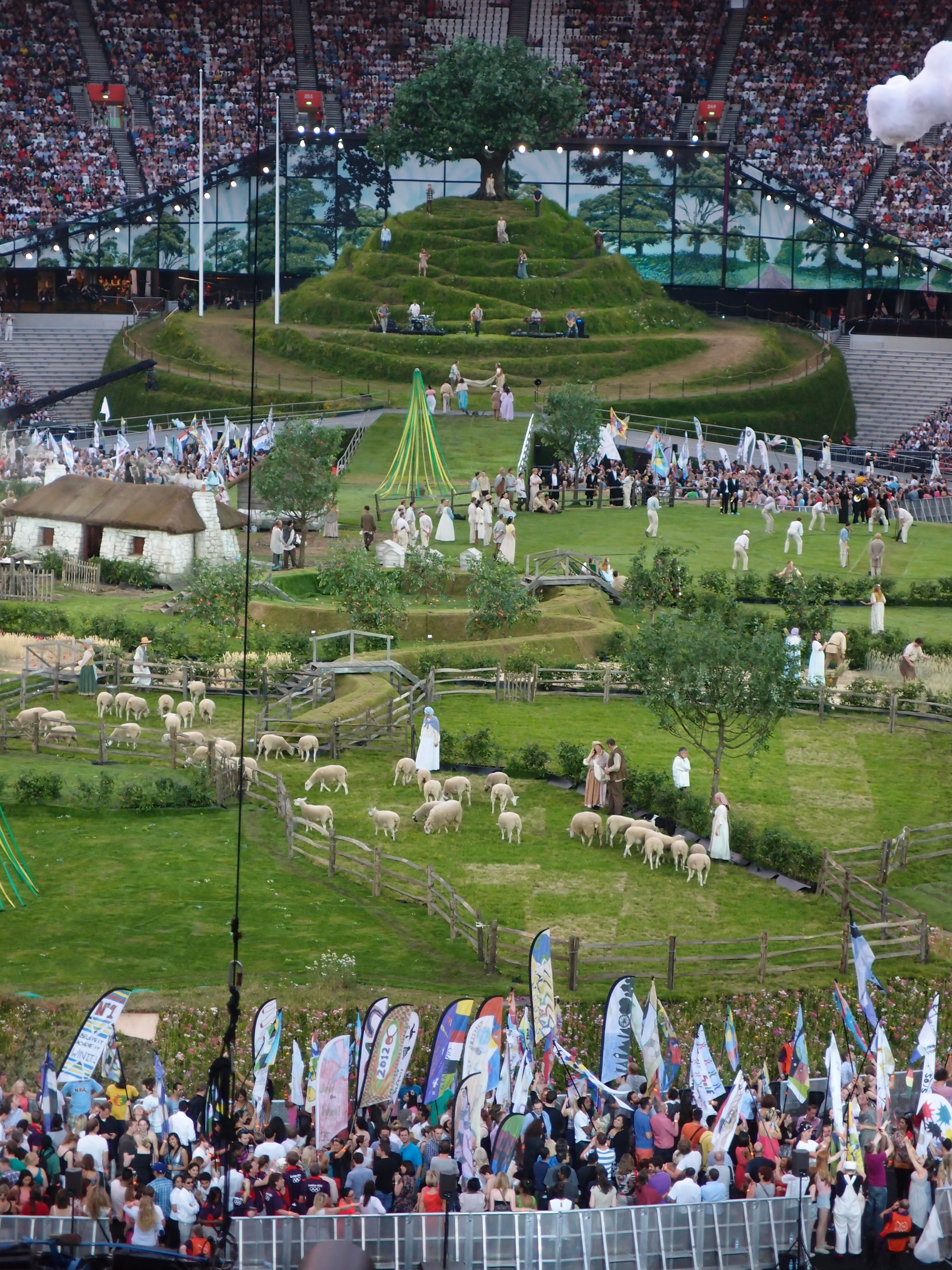
London 2012 Opening Ceremony – Stratford's historically agrarian economy

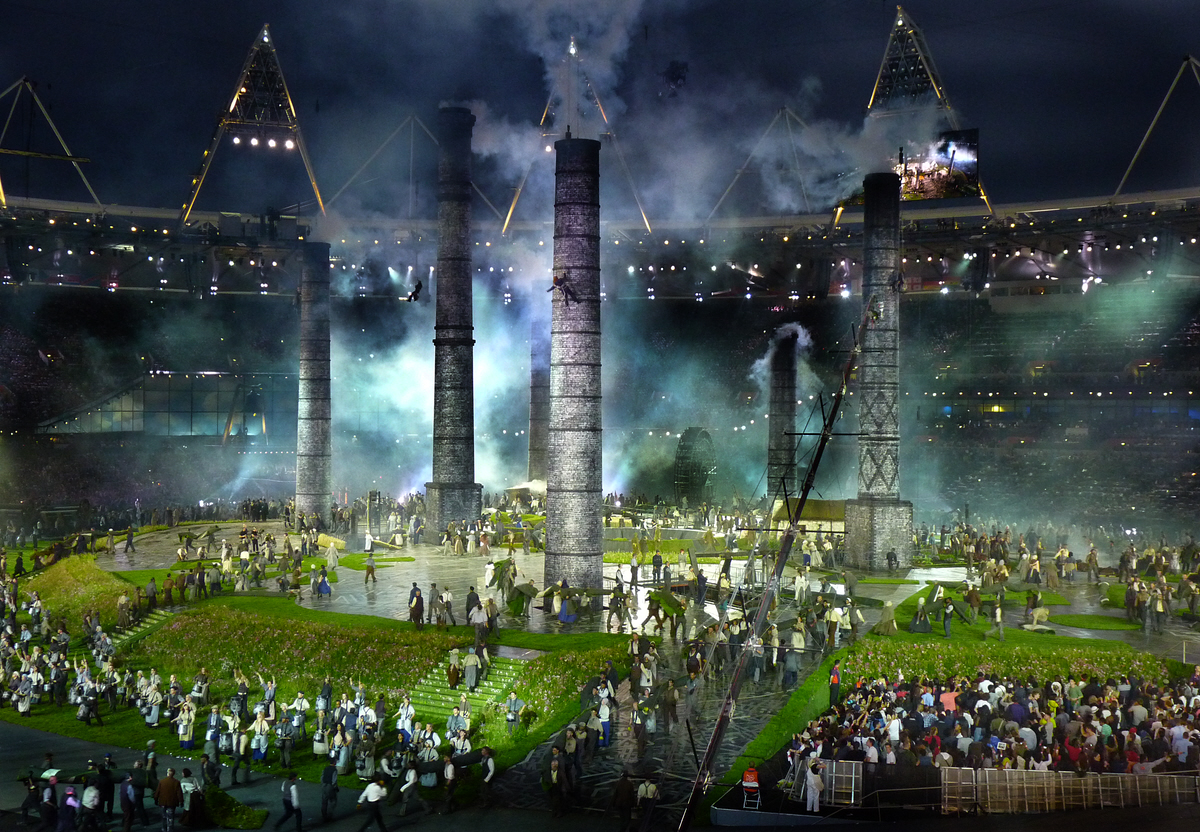
London 2012 Opening Ceremony – Industrial Revolution

The Stratford and national experience of the Industrial Revolution inspired scenes in the 2012 Olympic Opening Ceremony covering the traumatic transition from a 'Green and Pleasant Land' to the 'Pandemonium' of the revolution and the huge social and economic changes it brought. The level of industrialisation experienced by the parish and borough of West Ham led to it becoming known as the Factory centre of the south of England. Stratford was the base the greatest concentration of manufacturing activity within West Ham.

==== Pre-industrial economy ====
Stratford was originally an agricultural community, whose proximity to London provided a ready market for its produce. By the 18th century, the area around Stratford was noted for potato growing, a business that continued into the mid-1800s. Stratford also became a desirable country retreat for wealthy merchants and financiers, within an easy ride of the City. When Daniel Defoe visited Stratford in 1722, he reported it had "...increased in buildings to a strange degree, within the compass of about 20 or 30 years past at the most". He continues that "...this increase is, generally speaking, of hansom large houses... being chiefly for the habitations of the richest citizens, such as either are able to keep two houses, one in the country, and one in the city; or for such citizens as being rich, and having left off trade, live altogether in these neighbouring villages, for the pleasure and health of the latter part of their days".

==== Early developments ====
An early industrial undertaking at Stratford was the Bow porcelain factory, which despite the name, was on the Essex side of the River Lea. Using a process that was patented in 1744, Edward Heylin and Thomas Frye operated a factory near Bow Bridge called "New Canton" to produce some of the first soft-paste porcelain to be made in the country. The site of the factory was to the north of Stratford High Street near the modern Bow Flyover; it was the subject of archaeological excavations in 1921 and 1969.

==== Victorian acceleration ====
The Victorian era saw growth hugely accelerated by three major factors: the Metropolitan Buildings Act 1844, the arrival of the railway and the creation of the nearby Royal Docks.

Rapid growth followed the Metropolitan Buildings Act 1844, which restricted dangerous and noxious industries from operating in the metropolitan area, the eastern boundary of which was the River Lea. Consequently, many of these activities were relocated to the banks of the river, and West Ham became one of Victorian Britain's major manufacturing centres for pharmaceuticals, chemicals, and processed foods. This rapid growth earned it the name "London over the border". The growth of the town was summarised by The Times in 1886:

"Factory after factory was erected on the marshy wastes of Stratford and Plaistow, and it only required the construction at Canning Town of the Victoria and Albert Docks to make the once desolate parish of West Ham a manufacturing and commercial centre of the first importance and to bring upon it a teeming and an industrious population."

By the early 19th century, Stratford was an important transport hub, with omnibuses and coaches running into London four times every hour and coaches from East Anglia passing through hourly. The route into London was plied by Walter Hancock's steam coaches for a period during the 1830s. A small dock and a number of wharves were operating on the River Lea at Stratford by the 1820s, serving the needs of local industries. The opening of the Victoria Dock (later Royal Victoria Dock) nearby on the Thames in 1855, and the subsequent construction of the Royal Group of Docks (at one time the largest area of impounded water in the world), increased Stratford's importance as a transport and manufacturing centre. Rising population levels led to two major new Anglican churches in the area, St John's Church in 1834 and Christ Church in 1851.

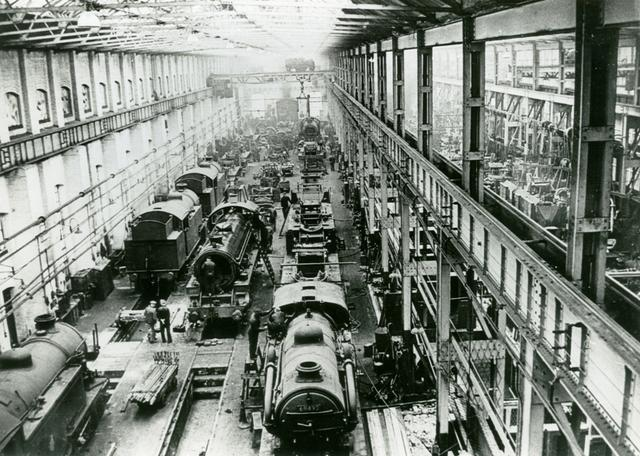
Engine repair shop of the Stratford Railway Works, 1921

Stratford station was opened on 20 June 1839 by the Eastern Counties Railway (ECR). The Northern and Eastern Railway opened a section of its authorised line from Broxbourne to join the ECR at Stratford on 15 September 1840. A railway works and depot for engines and rolling stock was established by Great Eastern in 1847 to the north of Stratford. At its peak, the works employed over 2,500, many of whom had homes, along with other railway workers, in the town that developed nearby. It was originally called Hudson Town, after George Hudson, the "Railway King", but after his involvement in bribery and fraud was revealed in 1849, the settlement quickly became better known as Stratford New Town, which by 1862 had a population of 20,000. During the lifetime of the Stratford works, 1,682 locomotives, 5,500 passenger coaches and 33,000 goods wagons were built. The last part of the works closed in March 1991.

=== 20th century ===
Stratford, like many areas of London, particularly in the East End, suffered significant de-industrialisation in the 20th century. This was compounded by the closing of the London Docks in the 1960s. Around this time, the Stratford Shopping Centre was built, beginning efforts to guide the area through the process of transformation from a working-class industrial and transport hub to a retail and leisure destination for the contemporary age. These efforts continued with the Olympic bid for Stratford, and the ongoing urban regeneration work going on there.

== Administration and scope ==
=== Geography ===
Stratford began as a hamlet in the northwest part of the ancient parish of West Ham, as the area urbanised it expanded, increased in population and merged with neighbouring districts.

Except as a ward, Stratford has never been a unit of administration and so, like many London districts, lacks formally defined boundaries. As described however, Stratford occupies the north-west part of West Ham and so takes the northwest boundaries of that area; boundaries which have subsequently become the northwest boundary of the modern London Borough of Newham.

In this way the River Lea and the complex network of the Bow Back Rivers mark the western limits of the area, which also extends north as far as the boundary of the London Borough of Waltham Forest.

Most of Stratford is in the E15 postal area, however the Royal Mail has given the new E20 postcode to the Olympic Park and Stratford City developments; this was previously only used by the BBC TV soap EastEnders for its fictional East London setting of Walford. The name "Walford" is a portmanteau of the names of nearby Walthamstow and Stratford itself.

=== Administrative history ===
Stratford was one of three ancient wards in the large ancient parish of West Ham, in the Becontree hundred of Essex. It came within the Metropolitan Police District in 1840.

Stratford ward of West Ham Civil Parish in 1867

Despite forming part of the built up area of London the parish remained outside the statutory metropolitan area established in 1855 and the County of London established in 1889. Instead, administrative reform was undertaken in the area in much the same way as a large provincial town. A local board was formed in 1856 under the Public Health Act 1848 and subsequently the parish was incorporated as a municipal borough in 1886. In 1889 the borough was large enough in terms of population to become a county borough and was outside the area of responsibility of Essex County Council. Stratford formed the centre of administration of the county borough and was the location of the town hall.

Following reform of local government in London in 1965, West Ham was reunited with East Ham (Ham is believed to have formed a single unit until the late 12th century) and small areas of neighbouring districts, to form the London Borough of Newham, part of the new Greater London.

=== Representation ===
Until 2024, Stratford was in the constituency of West Ham, represented in the House of Commons since 2005 by Lyn Brown of the Labour Party. Since 2024, following the 2023 review of Westminster constituencies, it has been in the constituency of Stratford and Bow, represented by Uma Kumaran.

Stratford is part of the Stratford ward for elections to Newham London Borough Council. Stratford is part of the area of the Mayor of Newham, a directly elected mayor. The modern borough had an electoral ward named "Stratford and New Town" from 2002 to 2022.

== Parks ==
=== Queen Elizabeth Olympic Park ===
Most of the 560-acre Queen Elizabeth Olympic Park is located within Stratford, with other parts of the park in the London Borough of Tower Hamlets, the London Borough of Hackney and the London Borough of Waltham Forest. The park was prepared as the main venue of the 2012 Summer Olympics and permanently opened to the public in 2014.

As part of the games and its legacy, the park included a number of sporting venues as well as extensive open spaces. Since the games many of the open parts of the park have been built on, replaced by cultural and commercial premises, as well as new housing.

=== Stratford Park ===
Stratford Park on West Ham Lane was laid out, in stages, by the County Borough of West Ham between 1899 and 1912. It was originally called West Ham Recreation Ground and is still known to many as West Ham Rec. The name was changed in 1999 to avoid confusion with nearby West Ham Park.

In 1892–93, before the land was acquired by the local council, the open plot opposite West Ham Police Station, was let to Castle Swifts F.C. for use as their home ground. This was the works team of the Castle Shipping Line which had a repair yard at Leamouth in Blackwall. The Castle Swifts named the ground Dunottar Park in honour of the company's ship RMS Dunottar Castle. The club was only based in Stratford for its first year, moving to Temple Meadows in East Ham after a dispute with the landlord. The club would merge with Thames Ironworks F.C., the forerunner of West Ham United F.C., in 1895.

== Landmarks ==
=== Gurney memorial drinking fountain ===
Directly to the south of the churchyard stands a 12.80-metre tall granite obelisk, which was erected in 1861 as a memorial to the Quaker philanthropist and abolitionist, Samuel Gurney (1766 to 1856). The plinth carries two brass drinking fountain heads on opposite sides, with the inscription: IN REMEMBRANCE OF SAMUEL GURNEY / WHO DIED 5 June 1856 / ERECTED BY HIS FELLOW PARISHIONERS AND FRIENDS / 1861 / "When the ear heard him then it blessed him" (a paraphrase from the Book of Job, Chapter 29 verse 11).

=== Old Dispensary ===
The oldest building in Stratford is the Old Dispensary on Romford Road, built in the early 1800s and which formed part of Queen Mary's Hospital for the East End.

=== Old Town Hall ===
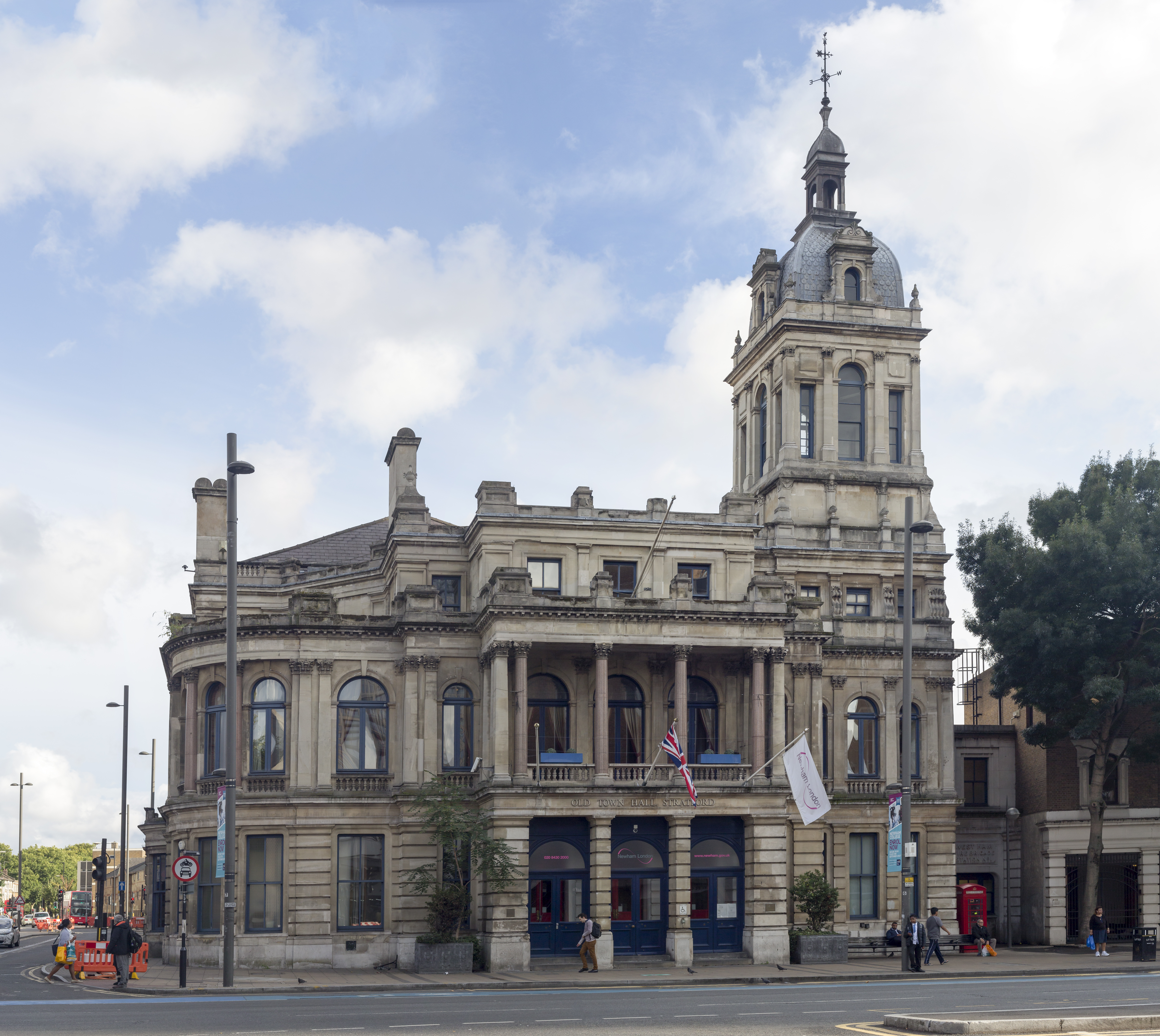
The Old Town Hall in Stratford Broadway

Designed by Lewis Angell and John Giles in the Italianate style with a 100-foot (30-metre) tall domed tower, Stratford Town Hall opened in 1869 as the public offices for the West Ham Local board of health. It later became the town hall for the county borough and was enlarged in 1881 to accommodate a courthouse and cells. On 26 June 1982, the main part of the building was badly damaged by fire; after a painstaking reconstruction of the original features and refurbishment as a conference centre, it was reopened by the Queen in July 1986. It is a Grade II listed building. The balcony of the Old Town Hall has provided the climax of victory celebrations for West Ham United FC, winning major trophies such as the FA Cup in 1980 and the UEFA Europa Conference League in 2023.

=== King Edward VII public house ===
Opposite St John's Church stands an early 19th-century pub, the King Edward VII, with original pedimented doors and early 19th-century bay windows; it is a Grade II listed building. It was originally called "The King of Prussia", either in honour of Frederick the Great or else after King Frederick William IV who visited the area in 1842 to meet Elizabeth Fry, the prison reformer. In 1914, the first year of World War One, the pub was renamed in honour of the preceding British king, Edward VII who had died in 1910. The old name was problematic as 'The King of Prussia' was one of the titles of the German Emperor, Kaiser Wilhelm II. More than a hundred years later, the King Edward VII pub is still locally nicknamed 'The Prussian'.

=== Robert the tank engine ===
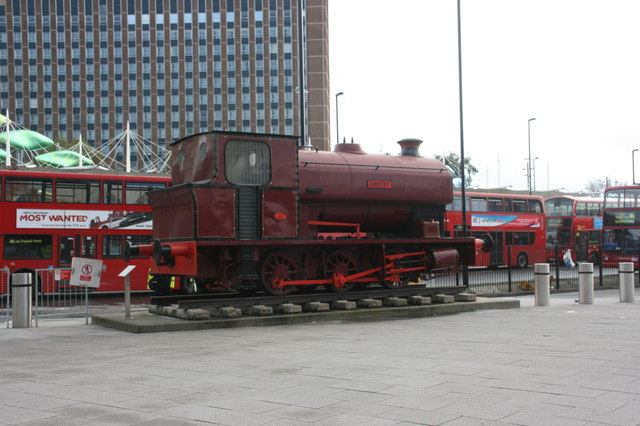
Robert, on the forecourt of Stratford station

A 38 tonne 0-6-0 saddle-tank steam locomotive named Robert is displayed in Meridian Square, the forecourt of Stratford Station. It was built in 1933 by the Avonside Engine Company of Bristol for use at the Lamport Ironstone mines railway near Brixworth, Northamptonshire. It was previously an exhibit at the North Woolwich Old Station Museum, but moved to Stratford in 1999. In 2008, it was moved on to the East Anglia Railway Museum at Chappel and Wakes Colne railway station near Colchester; there it was cleaned and repainted at the expense of the Olympic Delivery Authority and returned to Stratford in 2011.

=== ArcelorMittal orbit ===
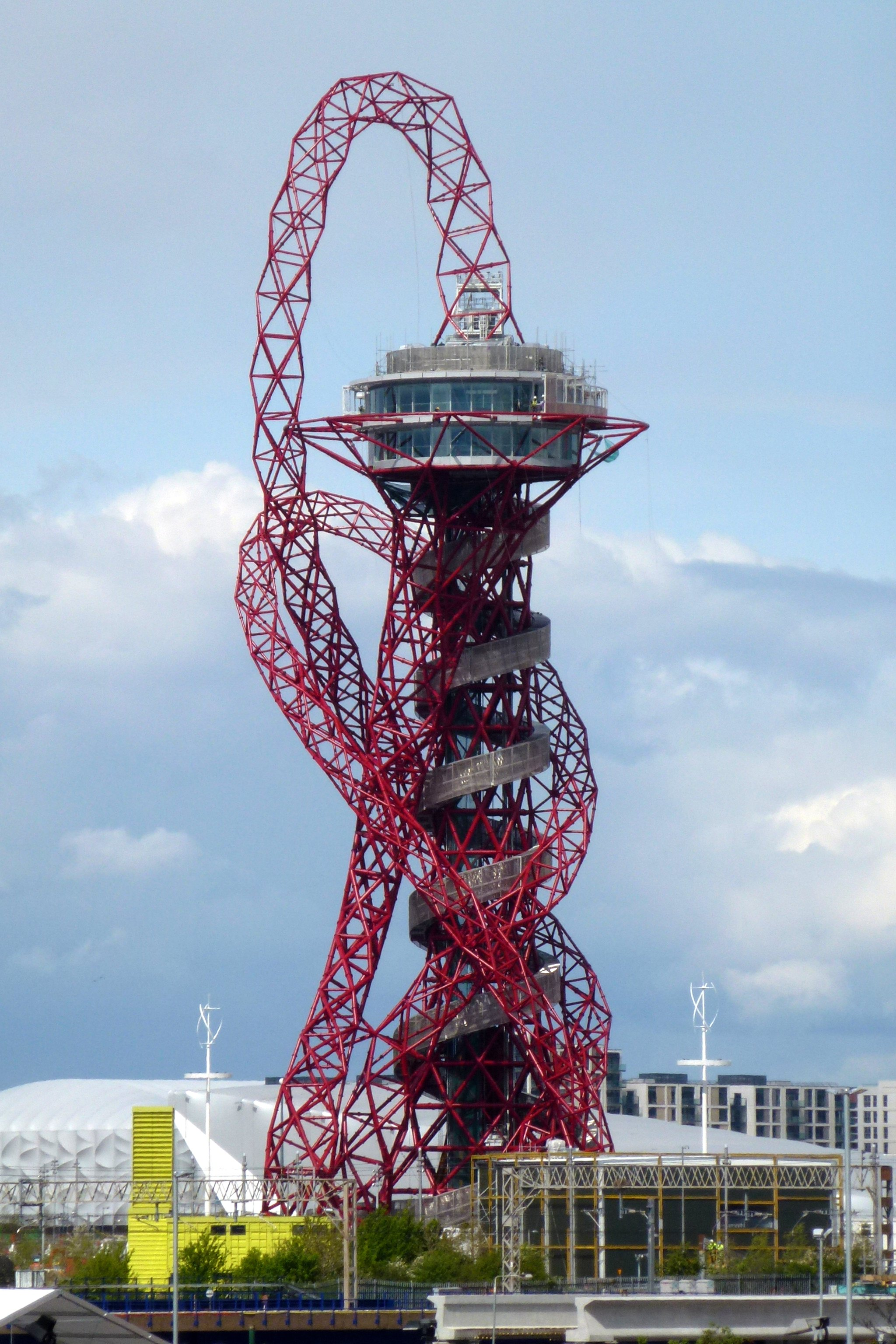
The ArcelorMittal Orbit observation tower in the Queen Elizabeth Olympic Park

A 114-metre-tall (374 ft) sculpture and observation tower in the Queen Elizabeth Olympic Park. It is Britain's largest piece of public art and is intended to be a permanent legacy of the 2012 Summer Olympics. It closed after the end of the Games, but was reopened to the public in April 2014.

=== Abbey Mills Pumping Stations ===
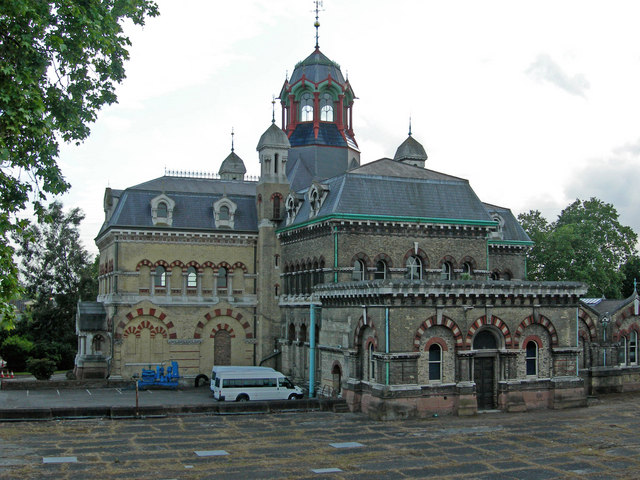
The Old Abbey Mills Pumping Station in Abbey Lane

Built in 1868, as part of the new London sewerage system by Sir Joseph Bazalgette, the building originally housed steam pumps and is a notable example of Italian style Gothic Revival architecture. It is opened to the public on an occasional basis, when the "flamboyant interior of enriched cast ironwork" can be seen. It was used to portray a lunatic asylum in the 2005 film Batman Begins and is a Grade II* listed building.

== Churches ==
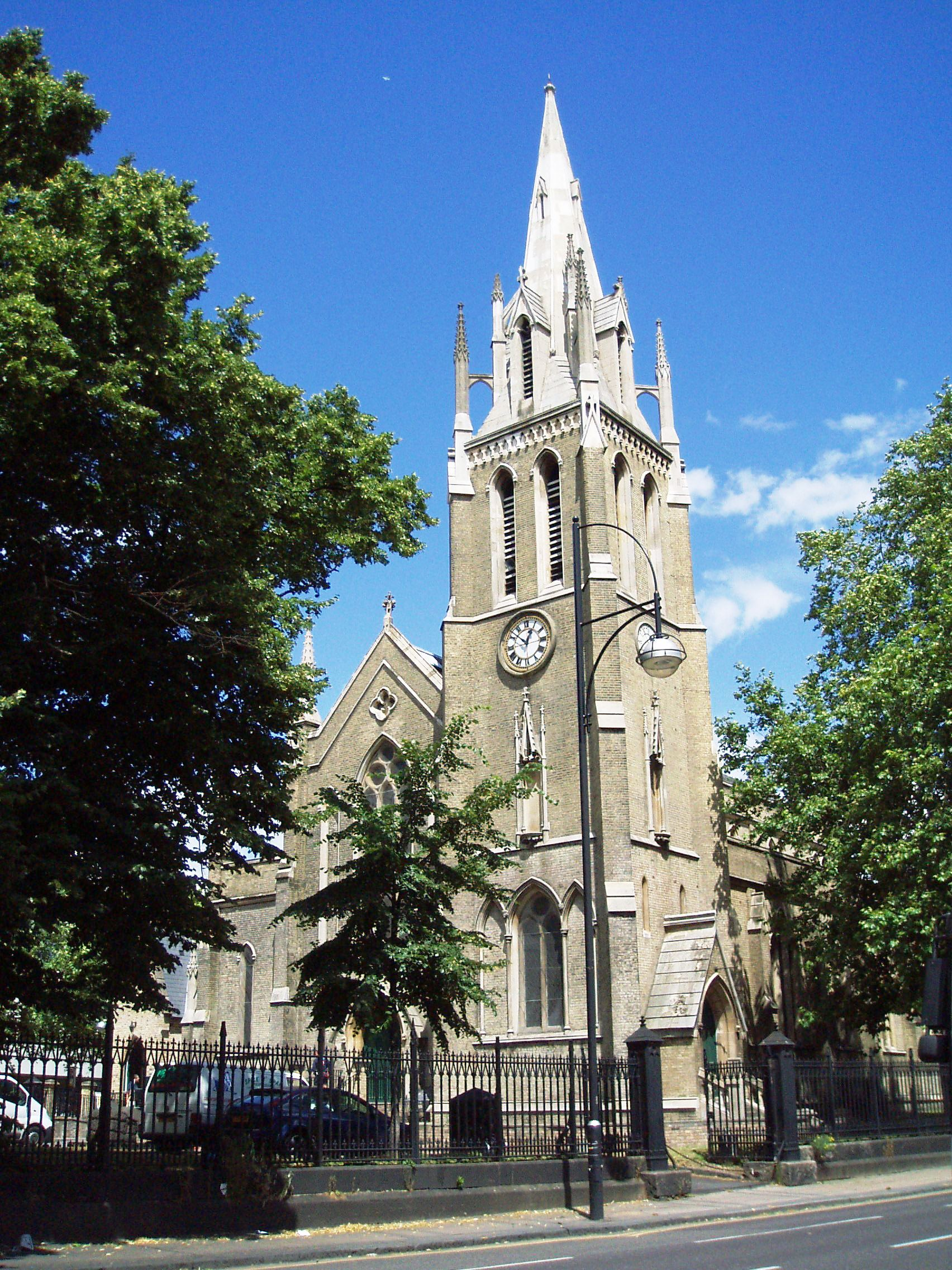
St John's Church in Stratford Broadway

The Church of England parish church of Stratford is the 1830s church called St John's on Stratford Broadway, a major thoroughfare, and The Grove and is part of Diocese of Chelmsford, itself part of the Province of Canterbury. It is a Grade II listed building. In its churchyard is a memorial to the Stratford Martyrs, who were burned at the stake in 1556 (possibly at Stratford, but more likely at Bow) during the reign of Queen Mary. The memorial itself is octagonal with terracotta plaques on each face, surmounted by a twelve sided spire. It was unveiled in 1878.

St Francis of Assisi Church, Stratford is the Roman Catholic church in Stratford. It was built in 1868 and is served by Franciscan Friars.

== Demography ==
=== Ethnicity ===
As of the 2011 census, White British is the largest ethnic group in the Stratford and New Town ward, at 21% of the population, followed by Other White at 19% and Black African at 13%; other ethnic groups comprised the remaining 47%.

=== Religion ===
The two main faiths of the people are Christianity and Islam, with 8,106 Christians and 3,643 Muslims.

== Economy ==
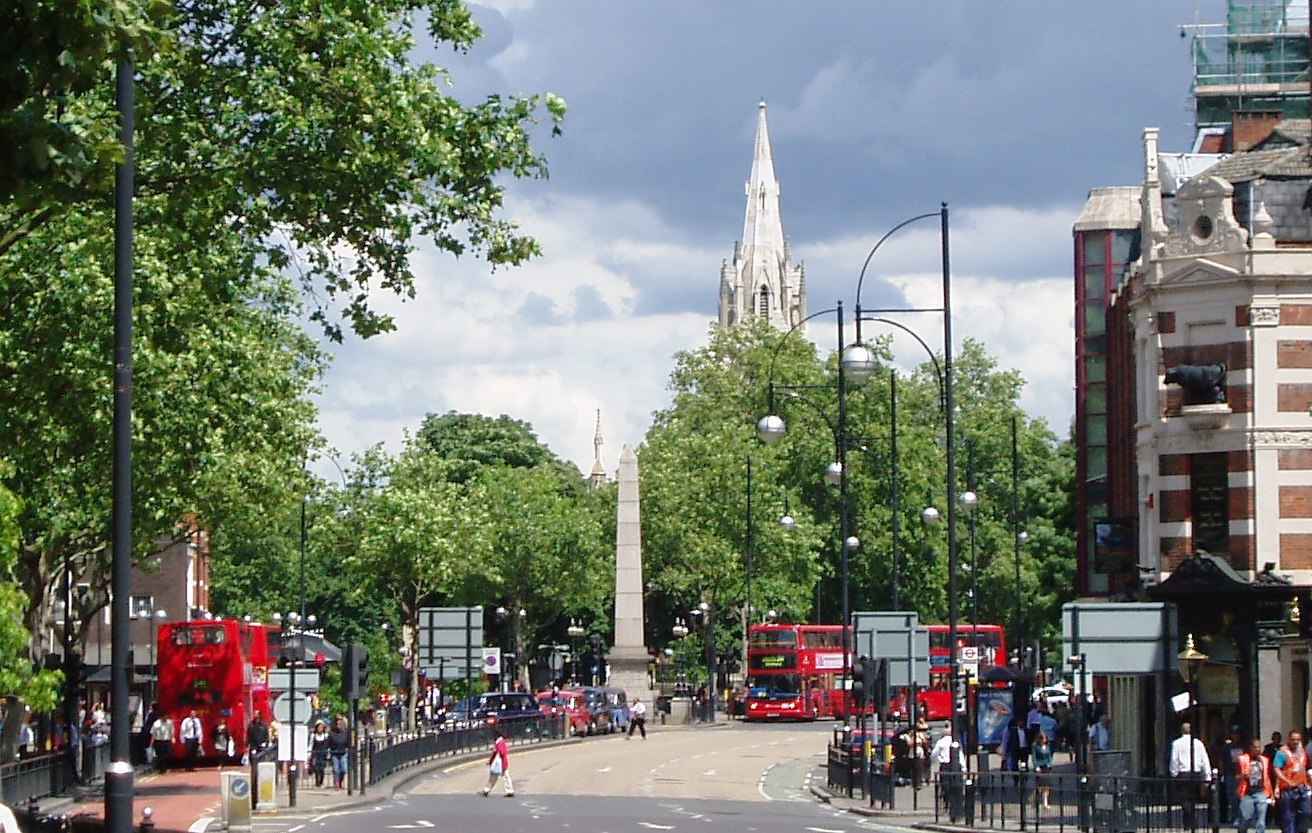
Stratford town centre with Stratford Broadway, the Gurney Memorial and the spire of St John's Church

Stratford's shopping centres, the Stratford Centre and the recently opened (2011) Westfield Stratford City, are on either side of Stratford station. Westfield Stratford City, home to 350 stores, is one of the largest shopping centres in Europe. The older centre has a range of accessibly priced stores, its indoor and outdoor market stalls, and the 'inshops' network of small retail outlets. The centre occupies much of the 'island site' created in the 1960s by the surrounding gyratory traffic system.

=== Regeneration ===
Stratford has been a focus of regeneration for some years as the local economy has grown, and is the location of a number of major projects.

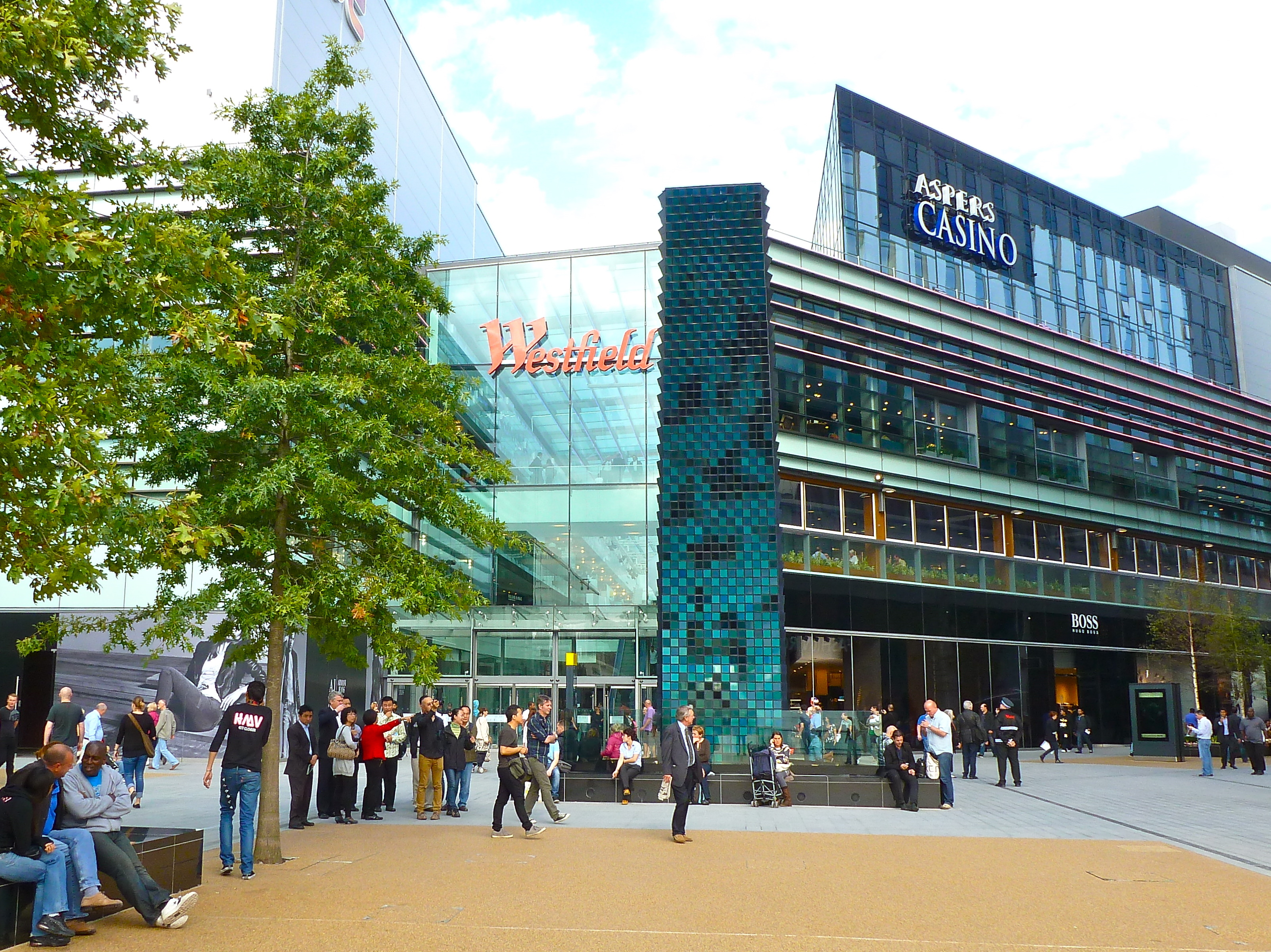
Westfield Stratford City, opened in September 2011

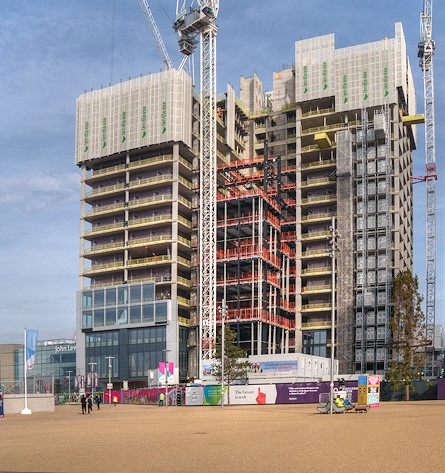
During construction of Stratford Cross

Developments:

- Westfield Stratford City is a multibillion-pound scheme to regenerate the 73-hectare brownfield railway lands to the north of the existing town centre. The vast shopping centre reported to be bigger in size than Bluewater was opened in September 2011. It has anchor stores for John Lewis, Waitrose and Marks and Spencer, in addition to other household names like Apple and Primark. The centre boasts a range of restaurant outlets, a cinema and casino, making it a leisure destination in itself, as well as its shopping facilities. Nearby will be a new purpose-built community of 5,000 homes, offices, schools, public spaces, municipal and other facilities destined to become a major metropolitan centre for East London, all to coincide with the opening of the Olympics in July 2012.
- The 2012 Olympic and Paralympic Games had their main base at the Olympic Park, which contained a significant number of venues including the Olympic Stadium, Aquatics Centre, and London Velopark. What was the athletes' Olympic Village is to be restructured as the new East Village development, providing 3,500 homes, half affordable and half private. The post-Olympics legacy plans include the largest new urban park in Europe for over a century, and the new Chobham Academy.
- Improving Stratford station with new platforms, walkways and entrances
- Rebuilding of Pudding Mill Lane DLR station as part of the Crossrail project
- 150 High Street, Stratford, a 41-storey 133 m (436 ft) high residential tower
- A 26-acre development called Sugar House Island at Mill Meads is expected to see 2,500 jobs brought to the area, along with 1,200 homes (over 40% three bed or more), a new school, 350-bed hotel and new amenities for local people. This is a relatively low-rise scheme, with Dane's Yard, its first phase, regenerating a Conservation Area to form a new hub for creative businesses, by European developer Vastint.
- Redevelopment of Morgan House and the southern end of the Stratford Centre into a new office, hotel, and 42- and 21-storey residential towers.

Olympic Park developments:

- Construction of East Wick & Sweetwater neighbourhoods will see up to 1,500 homes built
- Olympicopolis, a plan in the Olympic Park to see the Victoria & Albert Museum and University College London to have facilities by 2018.
- Stratford Cross; will see 13 office and 2 residential buildings as well as a hotel.

== Entertainment ==
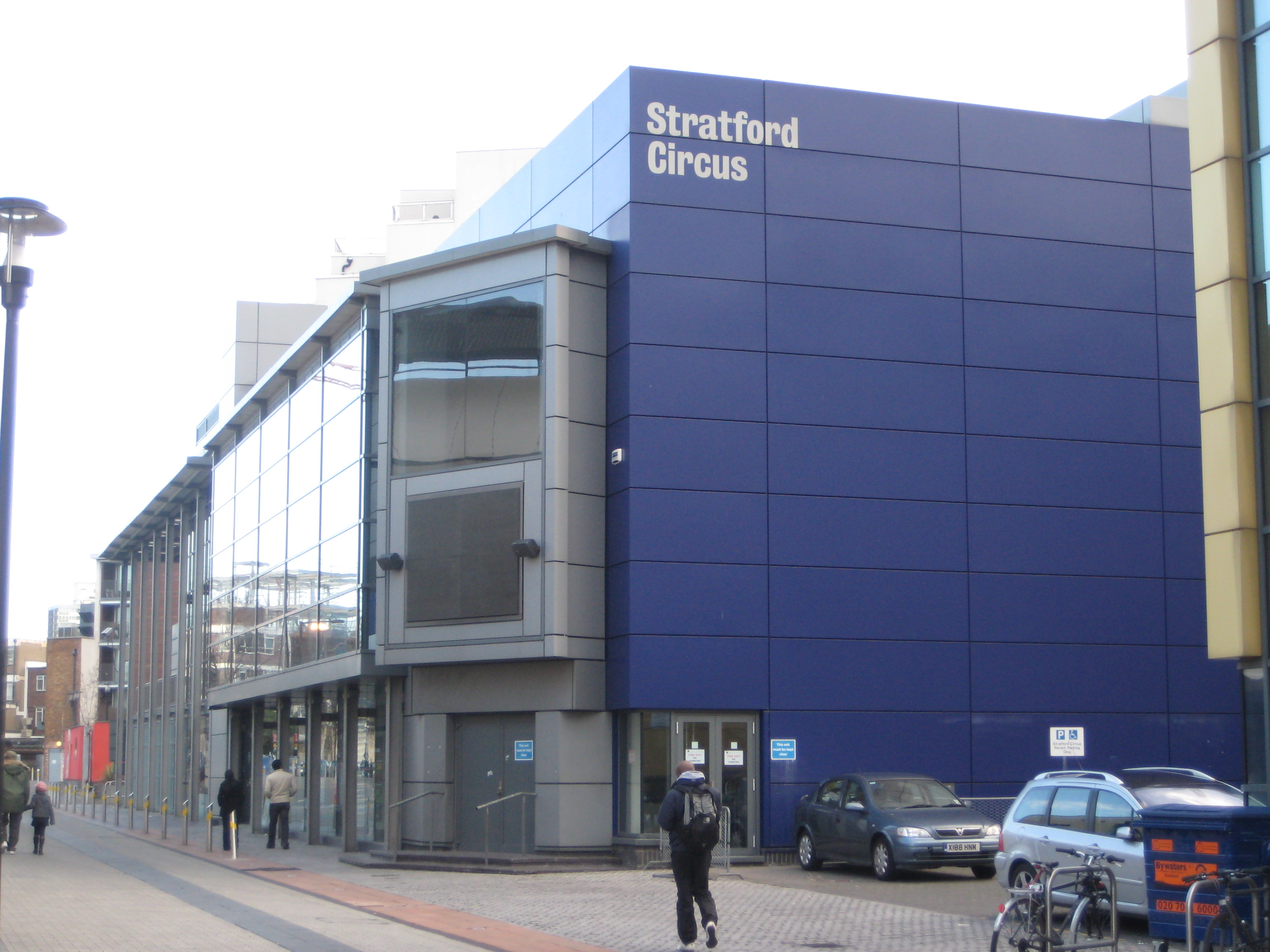
Stratford Circus on Great Eastern Street

Stratford's Cultural Quarter, adjacent to the shopping centre, is home to several arts venues, bars and cafes. The Theatre Royal Stratford East was designed by architect James George Buckle, who was commissioned by the actor-manager Charles Dillon in 1884. 'Stratford East' however is not a location; the 'East' is used to differentiate between Stratford (east London) and Stratford-upon-Avon. Stratford Circus is a contemporary performing arts venue that was designed by Levitt Bernstein architects and built with funding from the National Lottery which opened in 2001.

The Discover Children's Story Centre is a partner in the Cultural Quarter which is a purpose-built Story World and Story Garden are creative play spaces, it works with schools, libraries and the local community.

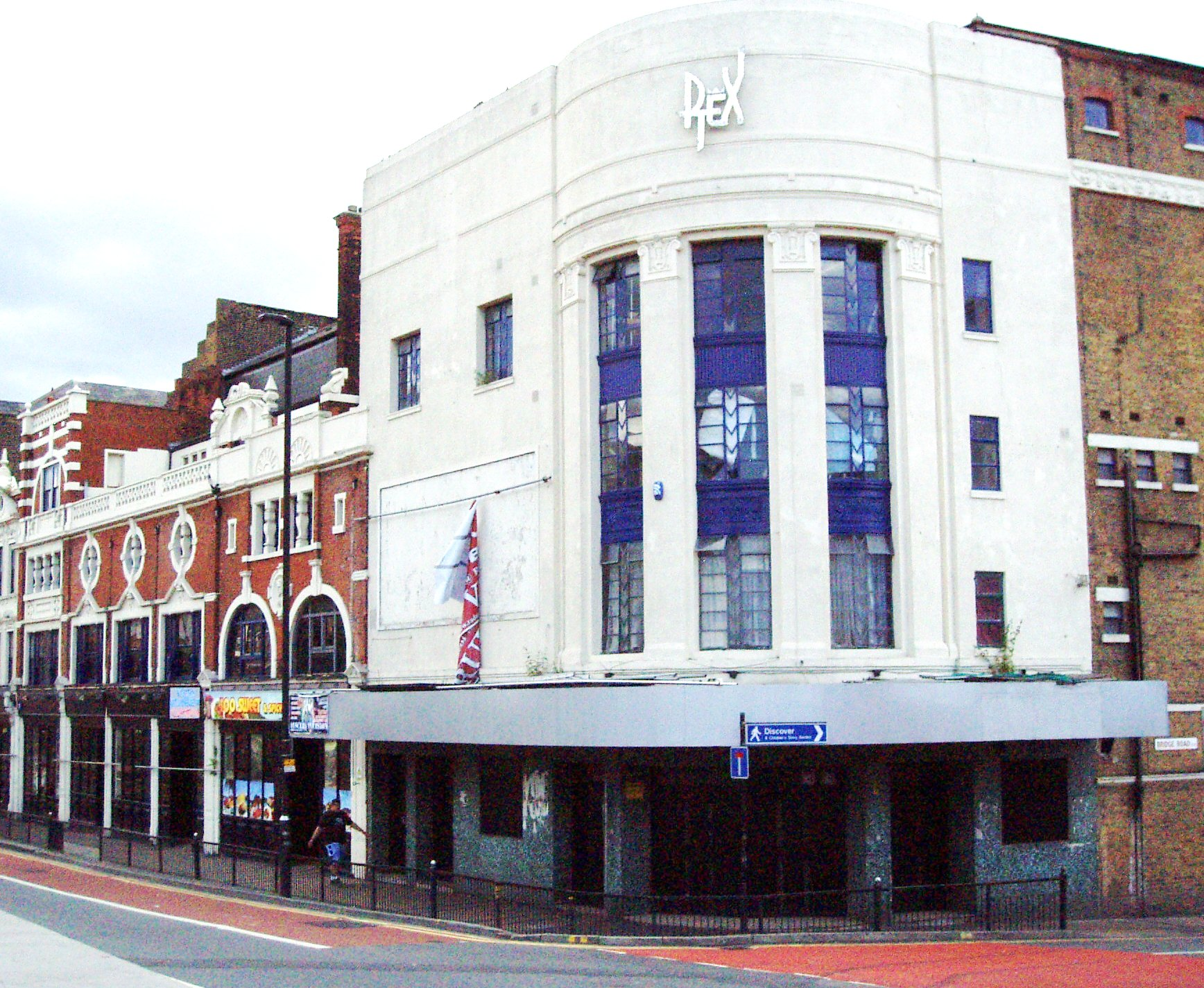
Stratford Rex in 2008

Stratford Rex on the Broadway was built in 1896 as a theatre, but underwent conversion to a cinema in 1933. After 1975, the Rex was empty for large periods, until being renovated in 1997 as a music venue. It hosted club nights including One Nation and Garage Nation, grime and reggae acts such as Roll Deep and Gregory Isaacs, and live music including Foo Fighters and The Prodigy. After a brief closure, it re-opened as a nightclub and then as a childrens entertainment and games zone, until becoming disused again in 2017 and threatened with demolition. In May 2025, Newham Council agreed the renovation of the building with a view to leasing it to the Columbo Group. In February 2026, it was announced that the Rex would have £15 million investment to re-open as a music venue in 2027.

== Sport ==
Stratford is home to the Queen Elizabeth Olympic Park, a sporting complex built for the 2012 Summer Olympics and the Paralympics; it is named after Elizabeth II to commemorate her Diamond Jubilee.

The first annual Invictus Games were held between 10 and 14 September 2014 in the park; events were held at many of the venues used during the 2012 Olympics, including the Copper Box and the Lee Valley Athletics Centre which had 300 competitors from 13 countries which have fought alongside the United Kingdom in recent military campaigns participated.

The EFL Championship football club West Ham United F.C. is based in Stratford Queen Elizabeth Olympics Park. From 1904 until 2016, the club's home ground was Boleyn Ground in Upton Park. In 2016, West Ham moved to a new multi-purpose ground, the London Stadium, which is also home to UK Athletics (known as British Athletics) who ground share with West Ham. The stadium has hosted a few 2015 Rugby World Cup and English rugby union matches, and also both the 2017 IAAF World Championships and the 2017 World Para Athletics Championships.

The London Aquatics Centre is also in the park; it has an indoor facility with two 50-metre (160-foot) swimming pools and a 25-metre (82-foot) diving pool.

== Education ==
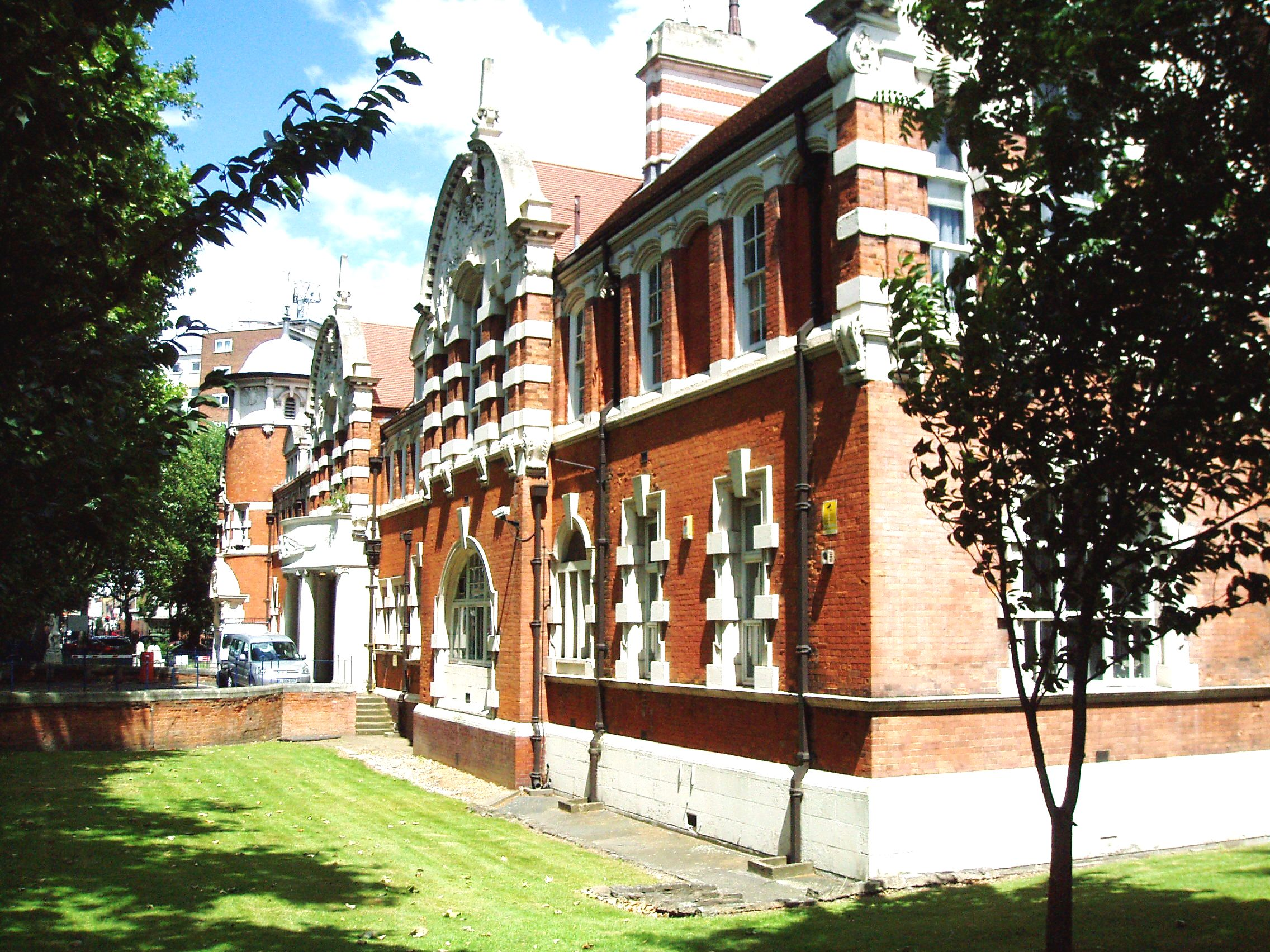
University of East London Stratford Campus

The University of East London (UEL) has a major campus in Stratford, whose main building, University House, is a historic listed building dating from the 19th century. The adjacent Passmore Edwards Building is also one of the area's most historic and beautiful buildings, with colourful frescoes and domed roof. In addition, Birkbeck College, part of the University of London, has launched courses in the area, initially using space provided by UEL, with a view to constructing its own campus in Stratford. In 2023, two universities opened new campuses on the Olympic park, with the London College of Fashion, part of University of the Arts London, relocating to Stratford, and University College London opening its new UCL East campus.

Newham College of Further Education is a further education college that has a campus in Stratford which opened in 1993 with Stratford as it secondary educational teaching site. In April 2016 the college announced a strategic alliance with University of East London.

The Chobham Academy is an academy in the Stratford neighbourhood of East Village and is run by the Harris Federation which opened in September 2013. It is classed as an education campus and comprises a nursery, primary and secondary school, sixth form and adult learning facility.

Sarah Bonnell School is one of the oldest girls schools in England and currently a girls only secondary school. It had moved to its present site in Deanery Road from Forest Gate. It took over the buildings that had previously been called Deanery High School for Girls and Stratford Green Secondary School.

The Carpenters Primary School is a state school in the Carpenters Estate, the livery company of the City of London Worshipful Company of Carpenters has close links with the school who make regular grants. The school is built on a site next to the original Carpenters' Institute.

Other schools in Stratford include Colegrave, John F Kennedy and also St Francis and Maryland in the locality of Maryland.

== Transport ==
=== Railway ===
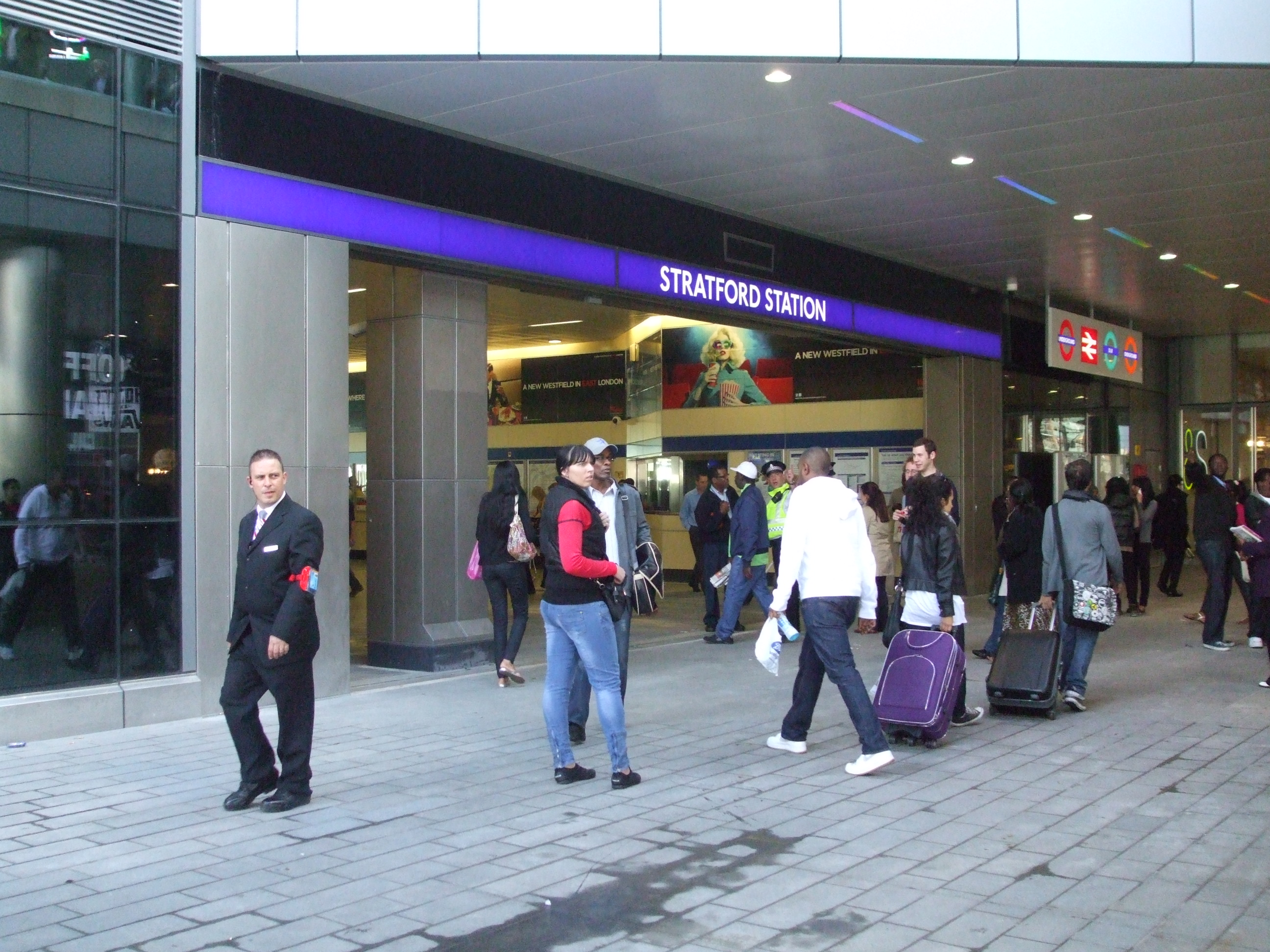
Stratford station's new northern entrance

==== National Rail ====
Stratford is a major National Rail interchange on the Great Eastern Main Line, North London Line, Elizabeth line and Lea Valley Lines. According to 2017–18 figures, 40.08 million passengers entered or exited the station, making it the UK's 7th busiest station. The station is managed by Elizabeth Line.

The station is served by several train operating companies:

- Greater Anglia provides services to destinations in East Anglia, including Southend Victoria, Colchester Town, Harwich, Ipswich and Norwich. The Lea Valley Lines take a route towards Tottenham Hale and Bishop's Stortford.
- Elizabeth line run services between Shenfield, Romford, Liverpool Street, Bond Street, Paddington, and Heathrow Terminal 4/Heathrow Terminal 5.
- London Overground services follow the North London Line towards Highbury & Islington, travelling through Gospel Oak and Willesden Junction towards Richmond or Clapham Junction.

Stratford International, sited to the north-west, is on the High Speed 1 line from St Pancras to Kent. It is served by Southeastern's domestic high speed services. The international and national rail stations are linked by a branch of the Docklands Light Railway, opened in August 2011.

Maryland railway station is located in the eastern part of Stratford town centre. It is a stop on the Elizabeth Line.

==== London Underground ====
Stratford is served by two London Underground lines:

- The Central line runs east-west through the centre of London; it links Stratford with Epping, Liverpool Street, Oxford Circus and Ealing Broadway.
- The Jubilee line was extended to Stratford in 1999. It provides services to Stanmore, Wembley Park, Bond Street and Canary Wharf.

==== Docklands Light Railway ====
The Docklands Light Railway (DLR) was extended to Stratford in 1987 and to Stratford International in 2011. Services link Stratford to Poplar, Canary Wharf, Lewisham, London City Airport, the Excel Centre, Beckton and Woolwich Arsenal.

Pudding Mill Lane is located to the south of the Olympic Park (though it closed during the Olympics for safety reasons due to its size) and west of Stratford town centre; it normally provides transport to the local factories. It was re-sited south as part of the Crossrail project.

Stratford High Street is sited to the south of Stratford Regional, situated on the site of the former Stratford Market railway station.

=== Buses and coaches ===
Stratford bus station is adjacent to Stratford Regional and the Stratford Centre, served by London Buses.

London Buses travel to destinations in the West and East End, northeast and south London, served by London Bus routes 69, 86, 104, 158, 238, 241, 257, 262, 276, 308, 425, 473, D8 and by the 25 and N8 to Central London.

A newer bus station, Stratford City bus station, opened in 2011 as part of the Westfield Stratford City regeneration project to the north of Stratford Regional. London Bus routes 97, 241, 308, 339, 388, 108 and N205 call here. National Express run coaches from Stratford City bus station to Stansted Airport and destinations in East Anglia.

=== Road ===
Stratford is connected to the National Road Network by several major routes.

The A12 passes through Stratford between Bow and Leyton, carrying eastbound traffic from London towards the North Circular, the M25, the M11 and East Anglia. The A11 (Bow Road) meets the A12 at the Bow Interchange to Stratford's south-west. The A11 carries traffic between the City and Stratford, whilst the A12 to the south carries traffic to the A13 and Canary Wharf. Transport for London (TfL) are responsible for the A11 and A12 roads.

Stratford High Street is numbered the A118, which runs from Bow Interchange to Ilford and Romford. The A112 is a north–south route through Stratford, which ultimately terminates near Chingford in the north (via Leyton and Walthamstow) and London City Airport in the south.

All roads in Stratford are part of London's Low Emission Zone.

==== Air quality ====
Newham Council partake in roadside pollution monitoring. In a 2018 report, Leytonstone Road in Stratford recorded the highest percentage of Nitrogen Dioxide (NO_{2}) in roadside air of all monitoring sites in Newham, with an annual mean of 60%. Temple Mills Lane in Stratford recorded an annual mean of 40%. It is thought that Nitrogen Dioxide is linked to respiratory conditions, can decrease lung function and increase response to allergens.

=== Cycling ===
Stratford is linked to London's cycle network, with cycling infrastructure provided by both Transport for London (TfL) and Newham Council.

The eastern terminus of Cycle Superhighway 2 (CS2) is on Stratford High Street. CS2 follows Stratford High Street southwest on segregated cycle track towards Bow Interchange. Signal controls at Bow Interchange give priority to cyclists, who can also use cycle lanes to cross the junction. CS2 then follows Bow Road (the A11) to Aldgate on cycle track. CS2 was the first fully segregated Cycle Superhighway to open in London.

Quietway 6 passes through the north of Stratford between Victoria Park and Wanstead, running non-stop to Barkingside in the northeast. Quietway 22 runs from Victoria Park, over Stratford High Street (CS2), towards Plaistow and Beckton. Quietways are signposted routes on quieter roads.

National Cycle Route 1 (NCN1) skirts around Stratford on its northwestern edge, running along the Hertford Union Canal and Lee Navigation towpaths. NCN1 is a long cycle route between Dover, Kent, and the Shetland Islands, running in north London non-stop between the Greenwich Foot Tunnel and Waltham Abbey. Cycling is permitted on the Hertford Union Canal and Lee Navigation towpaths around Stratford, which are shared-use paths maintained by the Canal and River Trust.

The Santander Cycles sharing scheme operates in Stratford.

Between 2010 and 2014, the A118 (Stratford High Street) saw 153 pedal cycle casualties, constituting a 31% share of cycle casualties in Newham. By 2016, however, there were only 79 serious cyclist injuries across the whole borough, with no deaths. The borough council has launched a "cycling strategy" to improve cycling provisions between 2018 and 2025.

== Media ==
The Newham Recorder is the local newspaper.

The pirate station Deja Vu FM, known for its role in the UK Garage and Grime scenes, broadcast from Waterden Road in the 1990s.

== In popular culture ==
Stratford has been used as a shooting location for numerous films, notably Sparrows Can't Sing (1963) and Bronco Bullfrog (1970), Batman Begins (2005) and Attack the Block (2011). The promotional film for the Beatles' "Penny Lane" single was filmed in and around the southern part of Angel Lane, demolished in the late 1960s to build the Stratford Centre.

The Cart and Horses public house is associated with the heavy metal band Iron Maiden.

== People from Stratford ==
See Category:People from Stratford, London

== See also ==
- Stratford City
- Stratford Martyrs
- Maryland, London
- List of people from Newham
- List of schools in Newham
- MSG Sphere London
