= 12 Endeavour Square =

Commercial building within Stratford Cross, London

- Location within Greater London
- Former names: S5
- Alternative names: 1 Westfield Avenue

General information
- Status: Completed
- Type: Office
- Location: 12 Endeavour Square; 1 Westfield Avenue, Stratford Cross, England
- Coordinates: 51°32′31.873″N 0°0′33.977″W
- Current tenants: Financial Conduct Authority; UNICEF
- Construction started: May 2015
- Completed: April 2018
- Owner: DWS Group

Technical details
- Floor count: 20
- Floor area: 515,000 sq ft (47,800 m^{2})
- Lifts/elevators: 8

Design and construction
- Architecture firm: Rogers Stirk Harbour + Partners
- Developer: Lendlease; London & Continental Railways
- Main contractor: Lendlease

Website
- www.twelveesq.com

12 Endeavour Square, also known as 1 Westfield Avenue, is a commercial building within Stratford Cross, occupied by the Financial Conduct Authority and UNICEF. It was completed in 2018, its developers were Lendlease and London & Continental Railways, and its architect was Rogers Stirk Harbour + Partners.
