= Stabbing of Stephen Timms =

Attempted assassination of British politician

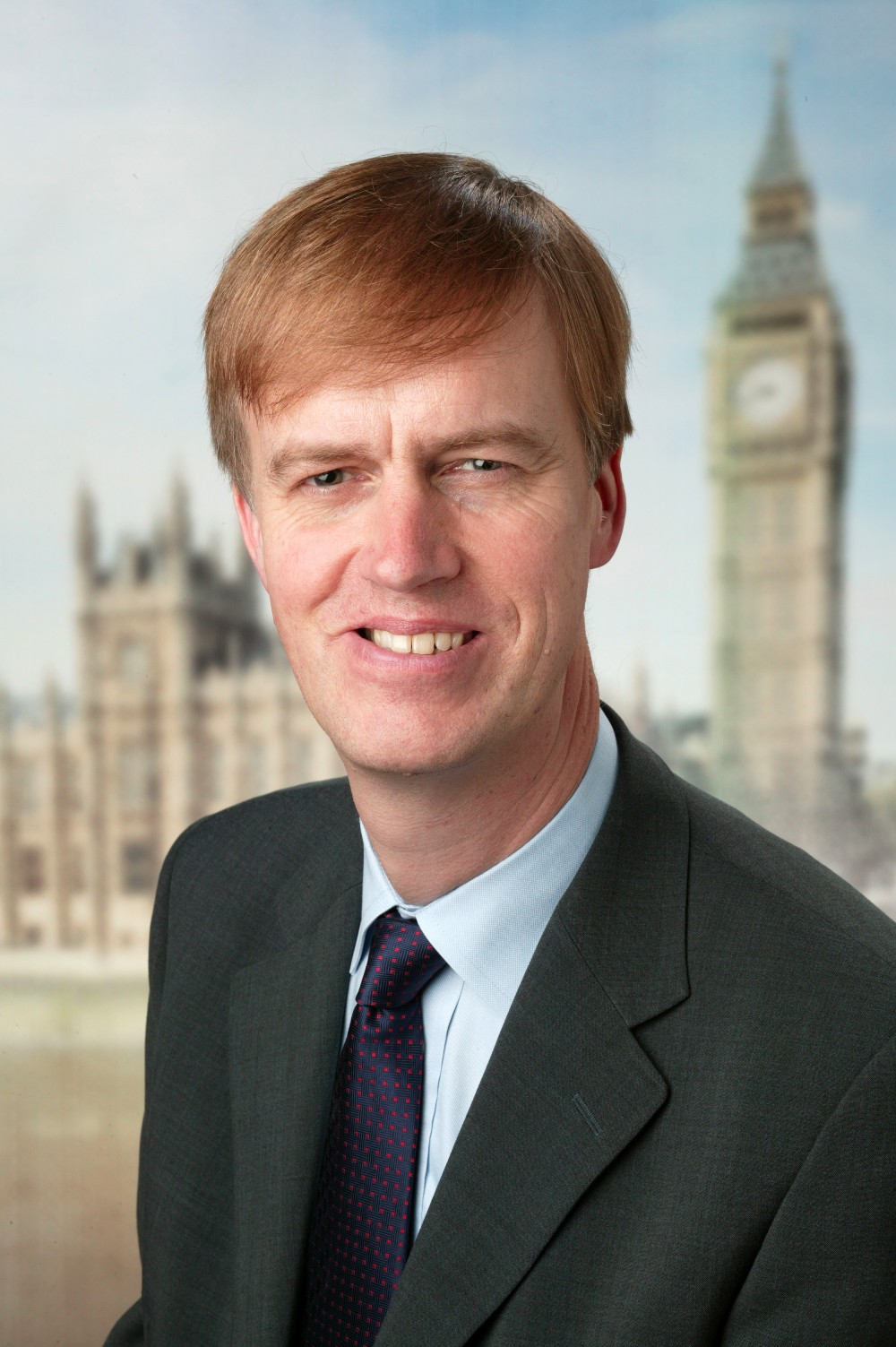
- Stephen Timms
- Date: 14 May 2010
- Location: Beckton Globe Library, Beckton, East London, England
- Motive: Islamic extremism
- Injuries: Stephen Timms
- Convicted: Roshonara Choudhry

On 14 May 2010, Stephen Timms, the Labour MP for East Ham, was stabbed whilst holding a constituency surgery by Roshonara Choudhry, a 21-year-old British student and an Islamic extremist, in an attempt to kill him. She was found guilty of attempted murder and jailed for life with a minimum term of 15 years. Choudhry was the first Al-Qaeda sympathiser to attempt an assassination in Britain.

Choudhry stated that she had been influenced by online sermons of Anwar al-Awlaki, the leader of Al-Qaeda in the Arabian Peninsula. Following her trial, such material was removed from YouTube.

== Background ==
Choudhry was born to a Bangladeshi family in Newham, East London, and lived in East Ham. She was the eldest child and attended Plashet School in East Ham, later studying for her A-levels at Newham Sixth Form College. She had been in the final year of a degree in English and communications at King's College London, but had dropped out shortly before the attempt on Timms' life. In a police interview, she stated that she had left because she considered the university to be anti-Islamic, since they had given an award to the Israeli politician and statesman Shimon Peres, in addition to running counter-radicalisation programmes.

Choudhry was inspired to attack Timms by the online lectures of Anwar al-Awlaki.

== Attack ==
On 14 May 2010, Timms was approached by Choudhry, during his constituency surgery at the Beckton Globe Library in Kingsford Way, Beckton, East London. She acted as though she were going to shake his hand, and then stabbed him twice in his abdomen with a 6-inch kitchen knife, before she was disarmed.

She made "very full admissions" to the police, saying that she had been influenced by dozens of hours of sermons that she had watched of Anwar al-Awlaki, a leader of al-Qaeda in the Arabian Peninsula. She said her attack was to punish Timms for voting for the Iraq War, and as revenge for the Iraqi people.

Timms suffered "potentially life-threatening" wounds: lacerations to the left lobe of his liver, and a perforation to his stomach. A senior police officer said he "was extremely fortunate not to have been killed". He underwent emergency surgery at the Royal London Hospital, from which he was discharged on 19 May.

== Trial ==
Choudhry chose not to attend her trial for attempted murder at the Old Bailey, saying she did not recognise the court's jurisdiction. The prosecutor ruled out any suggestion that she suffered from a mental illness. On 2 November, Choudhry was found guilty of Timms' attempted murder. She was subsequently given a life sentence, with a recommendation that she serve a minimum jail term of 15 years. After the sentence was announced in court, a group of men in the public gallery began shouting "Allahu akbar" and "British go to hell." A small demonstration took place outside the court.

== Aftermath ==
After the court case, Timms said he was not bitter, but that forgiveness was not possible until his attacker showed remorse. He was seeking the banning of incendiary material on popular internet sites "to protect other vulnerable young people from going down the same road."

The Revolution Muslim website described Choudhry as a heroine for stabbing Timms, posted a prayer to destroy the "enemies of Islam", naming Timms, and responded to her conviction for attacking Timms by publishing a list of MPs who had voted in favour of the Iraq War, as Timms had, giving advice on how to find details of their constituency surgeries.

Choudhry is incarcerated at HM Prison Bronzefield in Ashford, Surrey. As a Category A prisoner, Choudhry must be strip-searched before and after being visited. For religious reasons, she opposes this, and instead chooses to remain in solitary confinement.
