= Forest Gate Community School =

Coordinates: 51.5500°N 0.0229°E

Location
- Forest Lane; Forest Gate, London, E7 9BB; England

Information
- Type: Academy
- Motto: Fly, Grow, Connect, Strive
- Local authority: Newham
- Trust: Community Schools Trust
- Department for Education URN: 143274 Tables
- Ofsted: Reports
- Head of School: Thahmina Begum
- Gender: Coeducational
- Age: 11 to 16
- Enrolment: 1191
- Website: www.forestgatecst.org

Forest Gate Community School is a coeducational secondary school in Forest Gate, located in the London Borough of Newham, rated Outstanding by Ofsted in February 2020 for the second time. It was first rated Outstanding in 2016. The school was extended from eight forms of entry to ten – rising to a total of 1,350 pupils – starting with the Year 7 admission in September 2019 to meet demand.

The school was ranked in the top 50 in the country for progress in GCSE results in 2016, 2017, 2018, 2019 and 2020. The school was ranked 33rd in the country for progress scores for disadvantaged students in 2019. The school has the best progress 8 for Newham for secondary students for 2018 and 2019. In 2020, the school was named School of the Year by World Class Schools.

== History ==
The school was built by architects Colquhoun and Miller in 1965 to replace Whitehall Place School Senior Mixed School. It was opened in February 1966 by The Right Honourable Sir F. Elwyn Jones, who was the Labour MP for West Ham South at the time.

It was originally called Forest Gate County Secondary School.

Previously a community school administered by Newham London Borough Council, in October 2016 Forest Gate Community School converted to academy status. The school is now sponsored by the Community Schools Trust, the CEO of which is former headteacher Simon Elliott.

The first headteacher following conversion to academy status was Charlotte Whelan. As of 2024 the headteacher is Thahmina Begum.

== Awards and nominations ==
- The TES English Department of the Year, 2020 – WON
- World Class Schools status, 2017 – ACCREDITATION
- The Chartered Institute of Assessors, 2017 – ACCREDITATION
- The Evening Standard outstanding achievement in challenging circumstances award, 2017 – WON
- The TES secondary school of the year, 2017 – NOMINATED
- The National Association for Able Children in Education (NACE) Challenge Award, 2016 – ACCREDITATION
- World Class Schools Quality Mark School of the Year, 2020 – WON

== Remodelling ==
The school had a £15m remodelling in 2011, as part of the London Borough of Newham's Building Schools for the Future Programme. This included the introduction of a new four court sports hall, an open plan breakout space and a new passenger lift and staircase.

The school also has an on-site fitness suite/gym, including separate facilities for muscular and cardio workouts. It is open to the public outside of school hours.

Coinciding with its expansion to ten forms of entry, the school underwent further redevelopment to be completed for the beginning of the 2020–21 academic year. This included a new 3G pitch, amenities deck, dining hall, classrooms, and a multi-use games area.

== Scholarship Programme ==
Since September 2013, the school has run a scholarship programme, called the Prestigious Colleges programme, helping pupils get into private schools. In 2021, four students got scholarships – including two to City of London School. In 2022, students won scholarships to Eton College and Westminster School.

== Structure and Admissions ==
The school has an open admissions policy. It is the founder member of the Community Schools Trust, which includes Waterside Academy and Cumberland School.
