= Newham Sixth Form College =

Location
- Prince Regent Lane; Plaistow, Greater London, E13 8SG; England; 51.5223°N 0.0304°E

Information
- Type: Sixth form college
- Established: 1992
- Local authority: Newham
- Department for Education URN: 130452 Tables
- Ofsted: Reports
- Principal: Jamie Purser
- Gender: Mixed
- Age: 16+
- Enrolment: 2,500 (2018)
- Website: http://www.newvic.ac.uk

Newham Sixth Form College (NewVIc) is a sixth form college located in the Outer London borough of Newham. Situated on a single site in Plaistow, the college was established in 1992 to provide for students in Newham and neighbouring boroughs who opt to stay in education beyond GCSE O-levels. It is designed for students ages 16 to 19 and its curriculum includes A-levels as well as specialist pathway, levels 2 and 3 vocational, foundation level and ESOL programmes. The college at one time had an enrolment of about 2,500 students.

In 2024 the college merged with Newham College of Further Education.

== History ==
A school was first opened on the site as the municipal Plaistow Secondary School in 1926. In 1945 this became Plaistow Grammar School (later known as Plaistow County Grammar School) which in 1972 merged with Faraday Secondary Modern School to become Cumberland Comprehensive School.

After Cumberland moved and the borough of Newham adopted a sixth form re-organised education system, the Newham Sixth Form College was established and opened its doors to students in September 1992. Student numbers grew rapidly, increasing from 750 in the first year to over 2,000 in the 2002/3 academic year and more than 2,500 in 2009/10.

The college was led from 1991 to 2008 by Sid Hughes, who won a Lifetime Achievement Award in the Teaching Awards of 2005 and was awarded an honorary degree by University of East London upon his retiring from NewVIc. Eddie Playfair served as principal from 2008 to end of Spring 2018. Mandeep Gill began as principal in 2018.

In October 2024 the college merged with Newham College of Further Education to provide post-16 and adult education to more than 12,000 students in Newham. NewVIc had deteriorated and become the only sixth form college in the country to hold Ofsted's lowest possible rating, while the college principal had been on leave for a year and the chairman had stepped down. Jamie Purser, Newham College's deputy principal and NewVIc's acting principal, took charge of the new college from 1 January 2025.

== Curriculum ==
The college offers a range of A-levels, an Honours programme, specialist pathways, level 2 and 3 vocational programmes, as well as foundation, entry level and ESOL programmes.

== Statistics ==
At one time, NewVIc sent more disadvantaged students to university than any other sixth-form provider in England. In 2012, the college was ranked by the Sutton Trust as being in the top 5% of high performing sixth forms in England, in progressing students from disadvantaged backgrounds to university.

== Facilities ==
The college invested £6m in a new building on Prince Regent Lane, which includes a new reception, theatre and cafe.

== Achievements ==
NewVIc’s Sports Academy is one of four London colleges that have been accredited with Sports Leadership status by national charity, Sports Leaders UK. The college was awarded £70,000 by Sport England FE Activation Fund for increasing capacity over three years, including a specific focus on disability provision and leadership. This has resulted in significant success for a number of sports including cricket.

In 2019, the college received its best ever results which saw more students achieving A* - B grades in A Levels and more than 50% of BTEC students achieving Triple Distinction* in Level 3 Extended Diplomas. It was also graded overall as ‘Good’ by Ofsted and recognised as ‘Outstanding’ for its provision of Personal Development, Welfare and Behaviour in January 2019.

== List of Principals ==
1991–2008 Sid Hughes
2008–2018 Eddie Playfair
2018–2024 Mandeep Gill

== Notable alumni ==
- Roshonara Choudhry - Islamist convicted of the attempted murder of MP Stephen Timms in 2010.
