= Stratford Cross =

Business development in Stratford, London

Coordinates: 51.54329°N 0.01343°W

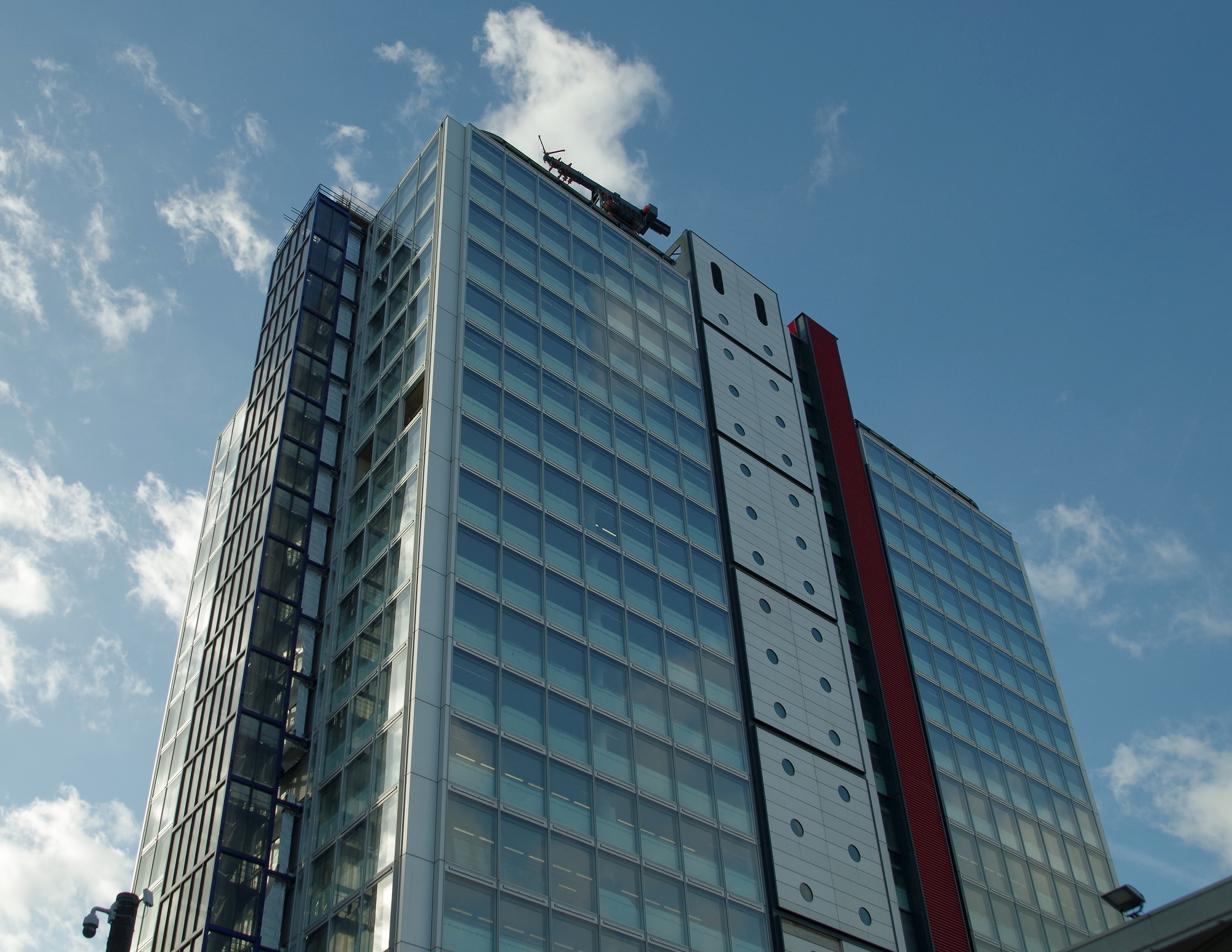
- Transport for London offices at 5 Endeavour Square

- Location within Greater London
- OS grid reference: TQ378845
  - Charing Cross: 5.6 mi (9.0 km) WSW
- London borough: Newham
- Ceremonial county: Greater London
- Region: London
- Country: England
- Sovereign state: United Kingdom
- Post town: LONDON
- Postcode district: E20
- Dialling code: 020
- Police: Metropolitan
- Fire: London
- Ambulance: London
- UK Parliament: Stratford and Bow
- London Assembly: City and East

Stratford Cross (formerly known as the International Quarter) is a new mixed-use neighbourhood currently under construction in the London Borough of Newham.

It is a business development project built by Lendlease and commercial developer London and Continental Railways (LCR) in a subdivision of Stratford, London, England. It is located between the site of the Westfield Stratford City shopping centre and the Queen Elizabeth Olympic Park. The postcode district is E20. Endeavour Square is located in Stratford Cross.

== Construction ==
Construction began in 2014 and is ongoing as of May 2024, with an estimated cost of £2.1 billion currently.

The code names, designated by the plots being occupied for the most significant buildings were "S5" and "S6", now primarily occupied by the Financial Conduct Authority (FCA) and Transport for London (TfL) respectively.

Planning permission was granted for International Quarter London North, as it was then known, in 2017 and the first buildings were designated code names "N22" and "N21". following the publishing of the design development report.

In late 2023, the area was renamed from International Quarter to Stratford Cross.

== Segmentation ==
Stratford Cross spans two core areas, South and North.

=== South ===
IQL South was the first to be developed and is partially occupied, with parts still under construction. It is located between Westfield Stratford City and Queen Elizabeth Olympic Park. The Turing Building, a 350,000 sq ft office building announced Everyman Cinemas as the anchor leisure tenant on the ground floor of the building.

=== North ===
IQL North was the second core area to be developed. It received planning permission in 2017 and received building code names "N22" and "N21" by the architects, Rogers Stirk Harbour + Partners (RSHP). The site is located between Penny Brookes Street and International Way, north of Westfield Stratford City.

== Tenants ==
=== Current commercial office tenants ===
Current tenants include:

- The Financial Conduct Authority currently occupies number 12 Endeavour Square.
- Transport for London currently occupies number 5 Endeavour Square.
- UNICEF
- Cancer Research UK
- The British Council

Whilst UNICEF are located inside Endeavour Square, their primary entrance is through 1 Westfield Avenue, occupying the top five floors of the FCA building at number 12 Endeavour Square. Some key tenants have connected shared infrastructure with the extended Westfield Stratford City campus, including badge access, fire and safety systems.

=== Retail units ===
There are a number of retail units occupied by Pret a Manger, Tonkotsu and an independent cafe, whilst the others remain unoccupied or are in the process of being fitted out.

=== Future commercial office tenants ===
As of November 2018, bespoke building construction is underway for future tenants, including:

- HMRC expected in late 2020, at number 14 Westfield Avenue.
