= Cumberland School =

Cumberland Community School

Location
- Oban Close; Newham; London, E13 8SJ; England; 51.52079°N 0.03289°E

Information
- Type: Academy
- Local authority: Newham
- Trust: Community Schools Trust
- Department for Education URN: 145113 Tables
- Ofsted: Reports
- Associate headteacher: Ekhlas Rahman
- Gender: Coeducational
- Age: 11 to 16
- Enrolment: 1415
- Website: www.cumberlandcst.org

Cumberland Community School is a coeducational secondary school located in the London Borough of Newham, England. There are 300 pupils in each year. It is on Oban Close off Prince Regent Lane close to its junction with Newham Way and has substantial land, sharing facilities with neighbouring Newham Leisure Centre. It is built on the site of the former Woodside Community School.

== History ==
The school was first formed in 1972 from the merger of Plaistow County Grammar School and Faraday Secondary Modern School; the school that was then occupying the building that had originally housed Denmark Street Board School.

The school's premises have changed a number of times. It was originally a split-site school with the lower school on Denmark Street E13, bordered by Cumberland Road E13 to the west and Holborn Road E13 to the north, (now demolished though some of the border walls still exist), and the upper school (that had been Plaistow County Grammar) on Prince Regent Lane E13, on the site of the current Newham Sixth Form College, known as NewVic. It moved to what had been the site of Trinity Boys' School on Barking Road, Canning Town E16, which is also now demolished and rebuilt as Rokeby from nearby Stratford.

The school went through a weak period, with only 10% of pupils obtaining five or more grade A* to grade C passes in the GCSE examinations of 1996, improving to 23% in 2000.

Cumberland School was designated as a Sports College in 2003. As host of the Cumberland School Sport Partnership (SSP), students are given the opportunity to develop their sporting talents in addition to enhancing their academic achievement. The School was awarded with The Football Association Charter Standard in 2005, and the school was offered as a training venue for the 2012 Summer Olympics.

Cumberland School was rebuilt in 2003 as part of the UK Government's Building Schools for the Future programme. The new building, with a sports hall, netball courts, two football fields and a triple jump area, was opened by Dame Kelly Holmes in 2006.

In 2007, the school achieved its highest results for GCSE Physical Education, with over 200 students achieving a pass. The specialist Sports College results for PE and Sport peaked in 2007 prior to the introduction of the BTEC First Diploma in Sport. In that year there was a growth in numbers of students that completed the British Sport Trust Level 1 Award in Sports Leadership.

In 2012, five students were the UK winners of The Big Science Challenge, an international competition run by the British Council and Rolls-Royce. The students produced a system for capturing water from a variety of sources including baths, sinks and showers, incorporating UV light for purification and hydroelectric fans for power generation.

in May 2018 Cumberland school converted to academy status. The school is now sponsored by the Community Schools Trust (CST). In 2019, the school began trialling a four-and-a-half day week, emulating another CST school Forest Gate Community School. School would start at 8.35 and finish at 3.30 except Fridays when school would end at 12.15.

== Headteachers ==
- 1972-???? J Angus McDonald
- 1994-2009 Jane Noble
- 2009–2013 John Bradshaw
- 2013-2014 Janet Moore
- 2014-2019 Gillian Dineen
- 2019–2022 Omar Deria
- 2022–present Ekhlas Rahman (Associate headteacher)
