= Newham College of Further Education =

Further education college in East Ham, London, England

Coordinates: 51.5319°N 0.0547°E

Location
- High Street South; East Ham, London, E6 6ER; England

Information
- Type: Further education (FE) college
- Motto: Great Courses for Great Careers
- Established: 1985
- Local authority: London Borough of Newham
- Department for Education URN: 130451 Tables
- Ofsted: Reports
- Chair of the Corporation: Paul Jackson
- Principal & CEO: Jamie Purser
- Staff: 500-1000
- Gender: Mixed
- Age: 14+
- Enrolment: 23,000 (2018)
- Website: http://www.newham.ac.uk

Newham College is a large general further education college in the London Borough of Newham, England, established in 1985. The college's main site is in East Ham, with a further site in Stratford and six further local neighbourhood learning centres; the college also runs the Fashion and Textile Museum in Central London. As of 2018 there are over 23,000 enrolled students at the college. At one point it was one of the largest colleges of further education in England.

In October 2024 the college merged with Newham Sixth Form College.

== History ==
Newham College (originally named Newham Community College until the 1990s) was established in 1985 through a merger between East Ham College of Technology and West Ham Further Education College.

In April 2016 the college announced a strategic alliance with University of East London.

In September 2019 the college was refused registration by the Office for Students as the college has failed to demonstrate that it delivers "successful outcomes for all of its higher education students".

Since 2006, the college has owned and managed the Fashion and Textile Museum, delivering a wide range of educational and training programmes as well as a full programme of exhibitions, including retrospectives from Zandra Rhodes, Kaffe Fassett and Orla Kiely.

In 2018–19, Newham College was the best performing college in London, with overall achievement rates of 90.9%

The college was awarded the Mayor's Construction Academy Quality Mark in 2018 and is now part of the Mayor's Construction Academy, a network of 21 training providers that have gained official recognition for providing the sector with suitably skilled workers.

In October 2024 the college merged with Newham Sixth Form College to provide post-16 and adult education to more than 12,000 students in Newham. Jamie Purser, Newham College's deputy principal and NewVIc's acting principal, took charge of Newham College from 1 January 2025.

== Faculties ==
The college's main teaching sites are located in East London, at East Ham and Stratford. The college also has an additional five community education sites in the Gainsborough Learning Centre, Beckton Globe Centre, Little Ilford Centre, Forest Gate Learning Zone and the North Woolwich Learning Zone.

== Notable alumni ==
West and East Ham colleges have had a number of notable alumni. Designer Lee Alexander McQueen took an A Level in art at West Ham Technical College before securing a Savile Row apprenticeship. Newspaper cartoonists Gerald Scarfe and Ralph Steadman both went to East Ham Technical College.

== Notable staff ==
Journalist Graham Usher taught at the college in the 1980s before moving to the Middle East.
