= London Borough of Newham =

Borough of Inner London, England

Coordinates: 51°31′N 0°02′E

- London borough
- Coat of arms Council logo
- Motto: Progress with the People
- Newham shown within Greater London
- Sovereign state: United Kingdom
- Constituent country: England
- Region: Inner London
- Ceremonial county: Greater London
- Created: 1 April 1965
- Admin HQ: East Ham

Government
  - Type: London borough council
  - Body: Newham London Borough Council
  - Mayor: Forhad Hussain
  - London Assembly: Unmesh Desai (L) AM for City and East
  - MPs: James Asser (L); Uma Kumaran (L); Stephen Timms (L)

Area
  - Total: 13.98 sq mi (36.22 km^{2})
  - Rank: 268th (of 296)

Population (2025)
  - Total: 376,542
  - Rank: 24th (of 296)
  - Density: 26,930/sq mi (10,400/km^{2})
- Time zone: UTC (GMT)
  - Summer (DST): UTC+1 (BST)
- Postcodes: E, IG
- Area code: 020
- ISO 3166 code: GB-NWM
- ONS code: 00BB
- GSS code: E09000025
- Police: Metropolitan Police
- Website: www.newham.gov.uk

The London Borough of Newham (/ˈnjuːəm/) is a London borough created in 1965 by the London Government Act 1963. It covers an area previously administered by the Essex county boroughs of West Ham and East Ham, authorities that were both abolished by the same act. The name Newham reflects its creation and combines the compass points of the old borough names. It is 5 miles (8 km) east of the City of London and north of the River Thames (the Woolwich Ferry, Woolwich foot tunnel and Silvertown tunnel provide crossings to the south). Newham is bounded by the River Lea to its west and the North Circular Road to its east.

Situated in the Inner London part of East London, Newham has a population of 387,576, which is the third highest of the London boroughs. It is the 25th most populous district in England. The local authority is Newham London Borough Council.

Newham was one of the six host boroughs for the 2012 Summer Olympics, for which most of the Olympic Park, including the London Stadium, was developed. It is also the site of the London City Airport. Major districts include East Ham, West Ham, Stratford, Plaistow, Forest Gate, Manor Park, Beckton and Canning Town.

== History ==
The borough was formed on 1 April 1965 under the London Government Act 1963, as a borough of the newly formed Greater London. It broadly covered the areas of the county borough of East Ham and the county borough of West Ham that were abolished by the same act. These in turn were successors to the ancient civil and ecclesiastical parishes of East Ham and West Ham. Green Street and Boundary Road mark the former boundary between the two.

North Woolwich also became part of the borough (previously part of the Metropolitan Borough of Woolwich, the majority of which lay south of the River Thames), as did a small area around Gallions Reach west of the River Roding which had previously been part of the Municipal Borough of Barking. East Ham, West Ham and Barking had all historically been part of the county of Essex, whilst Woolwich had been part of Kent prior to becoming part of the County of London in 1889. Newham was devised for the borough as an entirely new name.

=== Manor of Ham ===
The area of the modern borough was at one time occupied by a manor (an estate or landholding with certain legal responsibilities) called 'Ham'. The name comes from Old English hamm and means 'a dry area of land between rivers or marshland', referring to the location of the settlement within boundaries formed by the rivers Lea, Thames and Roding and their marshes.

The first known written use of the term, as 'Hamme', is in an Anglo-Saxon charter of 958, in which King Edgar granted the area to Ealdorman Athelstan. The territory was undivided at that time. A subsequent charter of 1037 describes a transfer of land which has been identified with East Ham, indicating that the division of the territory occurred between 958 and 1037.

The Domesday Book shows landholdings divided further, and by the end of the 12th century these manors were being served, singly or in groups of manors, by the familiar ancient parishes of West Ham, East Ham and Little Ilford (now also known as Manor Park), with some areas by the Roding a part of Barking, and the area now known as North Woolwich attached to Woolwich. The earliest recorded use of the name West Ham, Westhamma, comes in 1186, and East Ham, Estham, is recorded in 1204.

The boundary between West and East Ham was drawn from the now lost Hamfrith Waste and Hamfrith Wood in the north (then the southernmost parts of Epping Forest which extended as far south as the Romford Road at that time), along Green Street down to the small, also lost, natural harbour known as Ham Creek. Ham Creek was filled-in in the nineteenth century, but the small residual head of the creek still formed the boundary between the two areas into the late 20th century, when what remained was also filled in.

The formation of the modern borough in 1965 saw the merger of West and East Ham, together with North Woolwich and Barking west of the River Roding. Little Ilford had become part of East Ham as part of earlier local government reorganisations.

=== Medieval period ===
The prosperity of the area increased due to the construction of Bow Bridge, the only bridge over the Lea, and the creation of Stratford Langthorne Abbey.

== Governance ==
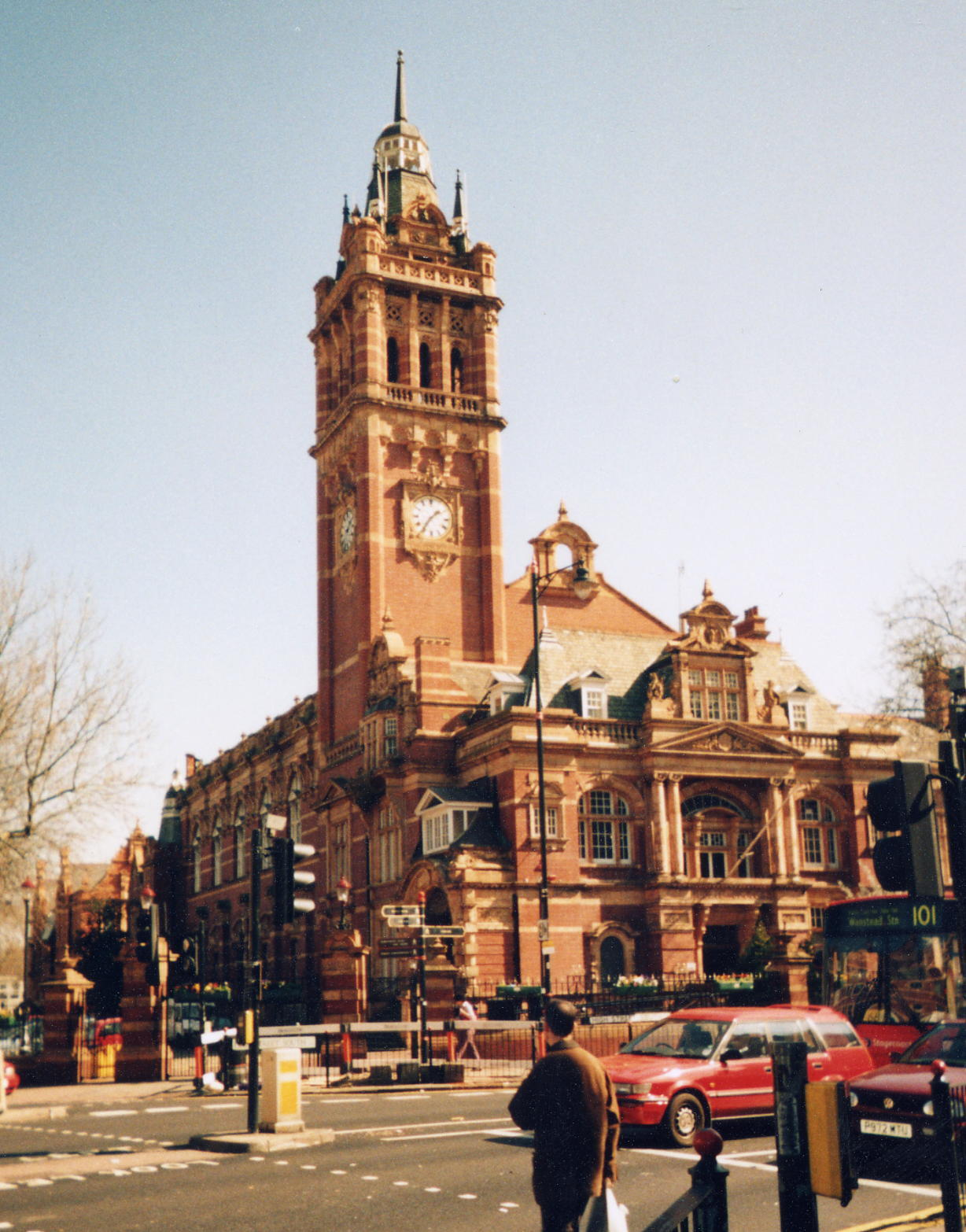
Newham Town Hall in East Ham (E6)

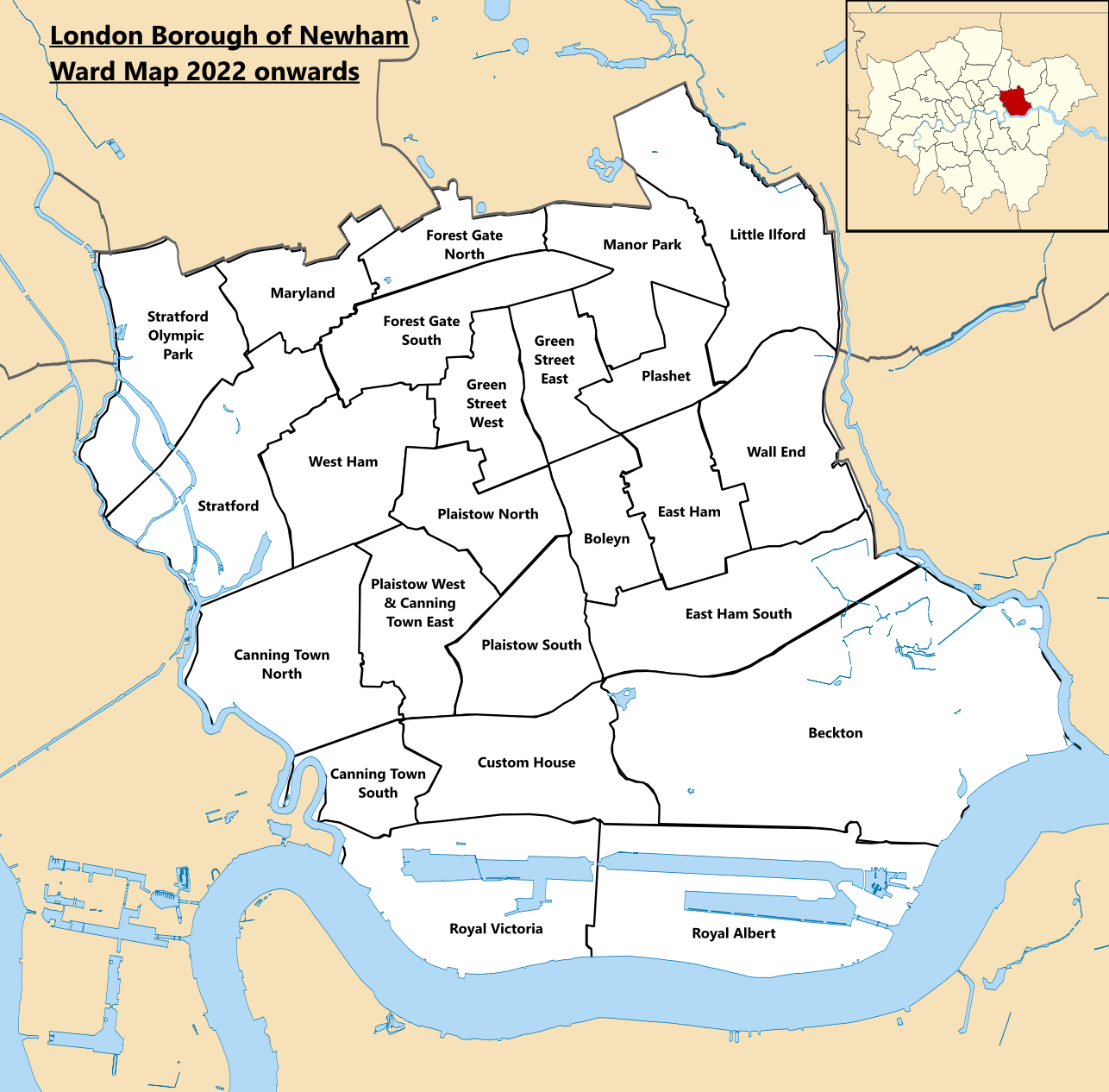
A map of the electoral wards of Newham Council from 2022 onwards

The local authority is Newham Council, which meets at Newham Town Hall in East Ham and has its main offices at 1000 Dockside Road, overlooking the Royal Albert Dock. Since 2002 the council has been led by a directly elected Mayor of Newham.

=== Greater London representation ===
Since 2000, for elections to the London Assembly, the borough forms part of the City and East constituency.

== Demography ==
Population pyramid of Newham in 2021

=== Population figures ===
Population
Year	Pop.	±%
1801	8,875	—
1811	11,166	+25.8%
1821	13,005	+16.5%
1831	15,553	+19.6%
1841	17,758	+14.2%
1851	24,875	+40.1%
1861	69,355	+178.8%
1871	113,835	+64.1%
1881	158,314	+39.1%
1891	259,155	+63.7%
1901	338,506	+30.6%
1911	442,158	+30.6%
1921	448,081	+1.3%
1931	454,096	+1.3%
1941	377,508	−16.9%
1951	313,837	−16.9%
1961	271,858	−13.4%
1971	235,496	−13.4%
1981	209,131	−11.2%
1991	221,146	+5.7%
2001	243,737	+10.2%
2011	307,984	+26.4%
2021	351,030	+14.0%
2024 estimate	374,523	+6.7%
Source: A Vision of Britain through time, citing Census population 2024 estimate

Newham has, after Barnet and Croydon, the third highest population of the London boroughs, with a population numbering 382,984 as of 2021. Despite growing since the 1980s, it is still drastically lower than its pre-war peak. In the period between 1951 and 1981, Newham's population shrunk by 28.87% owing to factors such as the war bombings and the increasingly high unemployment. The redevelopment of the Docklands as well as development related to the 2012 Olympics have contributed to reversing its declining trend.

=== Ethnicities ===
Population pyramid of Newham by ethnicity in 2021

Ethnic makeup of Newham in single year age groups in 2021

UK born and foreign born population pyramid in Newham in 2021. Males and females representing the UK born population while foreign males and females representing the foreign born population.

Newham has the youngest overall population and one of the lowest White British populations in the country according to the 2011 UK Census. At 32%, the borough has the second-highest percentage of Muslims in the UK, after the neighbouring London Borough of Tower Hamlets. A 2017 report from Trust for London and the New Policy Institute found that 36% of local employees in Newham are in low paid work; the highest percentage of any London borough. Newham also has a 37% poverty rate, which is the second-highest rate in London. Average income in Newham is £52,342 per year, compared with the London average of £60,319, which is approximately 13.2% lower than the London average.

Newham is very ethnically diverse. When using Simpson's Diversity Index on 10 aggregated ethnic groups, the 2001 UK Census identified Newham as the most ethnically diverse district in England and Wales, with 9 wards in the top 15. However, when using the 16 ethnic categories in the Census so that White Irish and White Other ethnic minorities are also included in the analysis, Newham becomes the second-most ethnically diverse borough with six out of the top 15 wards, behind Brent with 7 out of the top 15 wards.

Newham has the lowest percentage of both total White and White British residents of all of London's boroughs. The joint-lowest wards with White British population are Green Street East and Green Street West, each having 4.8% – the third-lowest behind Southall Broadway and Southall Green in Ealing. East Ham North follows closely, at 4.9%.

As of the 2021 UK census, people of "Bangladeshi" ethnicity are the largest single group in the borough at 15.9%. "White British" are the second largest group at 14.8%, with "White Other" third largest at 14.6%, "African" fourth largest at 11.6%, "Indian" next largest at 11% and then "Pakistani" at 8.9%. Newham has had a large Asian community for many decades; more than half of Newham's Upton and Kensington wards were of ethnic minority origin in 1981. The nationality to increase the most in number since 1991 is the Bangladeshi community. Newham has the largest total population of Asian origin in London; it is notably a borough with high populations of all three largest British Asian nationalities, having the 5th highest Indian population in London and the 2nd highest each for both Pakistani and Bangladeshi.

Newham has 1,340 residents who were born in Ukraine, the highest population of Ukrainians in the UK.

Ethnic Group	1971 estimations		1981 estimations		1991 census		2001 census		2011 census		2021 census	
Ethnic Group	Number	%	Number	%	Number	%	Number	%	Number	%	Number	%
White: Total	–	89.1%	141,043	69%	126,708	57.3%	96,130	39.42%	89,216	28.97%	107,947	30.8%
White: British	–	–	–	–	–	–	82,390	33.78%	51,516	16.73%	51,819	14.8%
White: Irish	–	–	–	–	–	–	3,231	1.32%	2,172	0.71%	2,039	0.6%
White: Gypsy or Irish Traveller	–	–	–	–	–	–	–	–	462	0.15%	353	0.1%
White: Roma	–	–	–	–	–	–	–	–	–	–	2,342	0.7%
White: Other	–	–	–	–	–	–	10,509	4.31%	35,066	11.39%	51,394	14.6%
Asian or Asian British: Total	–	–	38,203	18.7%	59,257	26.8%	81,651	33.48%	133,895	43.47%	148,187	42.3%
Asian or Asian British: Indian	–	–	22,259		29,105		29,597	12.14%	42,484	13.79%	38,642	11.0%
Asian or Asian British: Pakistani	–	–	9,214		13,162		20,644	8.46%	30,307	9.84%	31,216	8.9%
Asian or Asian British: Bangladeshi	–	–	3,019		8,550		21,458	8.80%	37,262	12.10%	55,677	15.9%
Asian or Asian British: Chinese	–	–	1,109		1,803		2,349	0.96%	3,930	1.28%	6,213	1.8%
Asian or Asian British: Other Asian	–	–	2,602		6,637		7,603	3.12%	19,912	6.47%	16,439	4.7%
Black or Black British: Total	–	–	23,046	11.3%	32,214	14.6%	52,653	21.59%	60,256	19.56%	61,302	17.4%
Black or Black British: African	–	–	6,686		12,639		31,982	13.11%	37,811	12.28%	40,874	11.6%
Black or Black British: Caribbean	–	–	13,528		16,015		17,931	7.35%	15,050	4.89%	13,586	3.9%
Black or Black British: Other Black	–	–	2,832		3,560		2,740	1.12%	7,395	2.40%	6,842	1.9%
Mixed or British Mixed: Total	–	–	–	–	–	–	8,248	3.38%	13,945	4.53%	16,419	4.6%
Mixed: White and Black Caribbean	–	–	–	–	–	–	2,986	1.22%	3,957	1.28%	4,253	1.2%
Mixed: White and Black African	–	–	–	–	–	–	1,657	0.68%	3,319	1.08%	3,317	0.9%
Mixed: White and Asian	–	–	–	–	–	–	1,652	0.68%	2,677	0.87%	3,324	0.9%
Mixed: Other Mixed	–	–	–	–	–	–	1,953	0.80%	3,992	1.30%	5,525	1.6%
Other: Total	–	–	2,108		3,121		5,209	2.14%	10,672	3.47%	17,175	4.9%
Other: Arab	–	–	–	–	–	–	–	–	3,523	1.14%	3,534	1.0%
Other: Any other ethnic group	–	–	–	–	–	–	5,209	2.14%	7,149	2.32%	13,641	3.9%
Ethnic minority: Total	–	10.9%	63,397	31%	94,592	42.7%	147,761	60.58%	218,768	71.03%	246,617	69.2%
Total	–	100%	204,440	100%	221,300	100%	243,891	100%	307,984	100%	351,030	100%

=== Health ===
In 2018, Newham had the lowest life expectancy and the highest rate of heart disease of all London boroughs together with the London Borough of Tower Hamlets.

In 2019, the BBC reported that Newham had the highest rate of tuberculosis in the UK at 107 per 100000 population, which was higher than Rwanda (69) and Iraq (45) according to WHO figures from 2013. More than 80% of TB cases in London occur in people born abroad. The UK average was 13.

=== Religion ===
Religious makeup of Newham by single year age groups in 2021

Religion in Newham as of 2021
1. Christianity (35.3%)
2. Islam (34.8%)
3. Irreligion (14.5%)
4. Hindu (6.10%)
5. Sikh (1.60%)
6. Buddhist (0.60%)
7. Jewish (0.10%)
8. Other (7.00%)

The following table shows the religious identity of residents residing in Newham according to the 2001, 2011 and the 2021 censuses.

Religion	2001		2011		2021	
Religion	Number	%	Number	%	Number	%
Christian	114,247	46.8	123,119	40.0	123,746	35.3
Muslim	59,293	24.3	98,456	32.0	122,146	34.8
Jewish	481	0.2	342	0.1	448	0.1
Hindu	16,901	6.9	26,962	8.8	21,405	6.1
Sikh	6,897	2.8	6,421	2.1	5,638	1.6
Buddhism	1,592	0.7	2,446	0.8	2,160	0.6
Other religion	664	0.3	1,090	0.4	1,765	0.5
No religion	21,978	9.0	29,373	9.5	50,795	14.5
Religion not stated	21,838	9.0	19,775	6.4	22,933	6.5
Total	243,891	100.00%	307,894	100.00%	351,100	100.0%

=== Transgender identity ===
The 2021 census showed that 1.5% of adults in Newham identified as transgender, derived from the Census question, "Is the gender you identify with the same as your sex registered at birth?". This gave Newham the highest proportion of transgender adults in England and Wales, with the Borough of Brent coming second (at 1.3%). The overall proportion in England and Wales was 0.5% with Brighton, an area well known for its LGBT communities, 1%. However, Prof Michael Biggs of Oxford University showed there was a correlation between the proportion of transgender people in these areas and the proportion for whom English was not their first language (35% in Newham and 34% in Brent, compared to 9% nationally), suggesting the question was not fully understood by some. Prof Biggs described the figures as "irredeemably flawed". In September 2024, Mary Gregory, a deputy director at the ONS said some people may have misunderstood the question, saying there was "potential bias" in how the question was answered "by those who responded that they had lower levels of English proficiency, some of whom may have mistakenly given an answer suggesting they were trans". As a result, the ONS downgraded the data from "accredited official statistics" to "official statistics in development" to reflect the possible flaws.

=== Immigration ===
This list includes top-15 sources of immigration to Borough of Newham for 2021 census:

#	Country	Number
1	Bangladesh	26,860
2	India	21,818
3	Romania	17,455
4	Pakistan	13,826
5	Italy	7,026
6	Lithuania	6,439
7	Nigeria	5,813
8	Bulgaria	4,800
9	Poland	4,288
10	Ghana	4,085
11	Philippines	4,033
12	Moldova	3,985
13	Sri Lanka	3,837
14	Somalia	3,755
15	Portugal	2,774

== Education ==
A 2017 report by Trust for London and the New Policy Institute finds that the GCSE attainment gap between advantaged and disadvantaged pupils in Newham is the 4th best out of 32 London boroughs.

=== Schools and colleges ===
The Borough is the education authority for the district providing education in a mix of Foundation, community and voluntary aided schools. The borough also owns and operates Debden House, a residential adult education college in Loughton, Essex, and is home to the Rosetta Art Centre, a dedicated visual art organisation which delivers courses at its base in Stratford and produces participatory art projects, programmes and initiatives. The Essex Primary School in Sheridan Road with over 900 pupils is one of the biggest primary schools in London.

=== Universities ===
The University of East London has two campuses in Newham:

- the Stratford Campus, at Stratford
- the Docklands Campus, next to the regenerated Royal Albert Dock

Birkbeck Stratford is a collaboration between Birkbeck, University of London and UEL to increase participation in adult learning. This is based on the UEL/Birkbeck shared campus, USS (University Square Stratford), in the centre of Stratford.

The University of East London had formed a partnership with the United States Olympic Committee which resulted in the United States Olympic Team using University of East London campuses as training bases during the London 2012 Olympic and Paralympic Games.

In September 2021, London College of Fashion had relocated to the Queen Elizabeth Olympic Park at Stratford, London. It is a constituent college of the University of the Arts London, a public art university in London, England.

UCL East is a campus of University College London located at the Queen Elizabeth Olympic Park in Stratford, London. Operations at the campus began with the opening of One Pool Street in 2022 and the campus was formally opened with the opening of the Marshgate building in 2023. The 2017 masterplan for the campus calls for the construction of another four buildings in the 2030s.

The Stratford Waterfront now accommodates facilities for Sadler's Wells and the Victoria & Albert Museum, as well as the new UAL campus for the London College of Fashion and a new university campus for University College London.

== Places of interest ==
=== Community ===
- The Hub, a community resource centre built by the local community, in Star Lane, E16, featuring up to the minute "green" features
- Grassroots, another innovative green resource centre built by the community. Grassroots is in Memorial Recreation Ground, E15
- Rosetta Art Centre, situated in walking distance to Grassroots, also in E15

=== Libraries ===
Newham has ten libraries (Beckton, Canning Town, Custom House, East Ham, Green Street, Manor Park, North Woolwich, Plaistow, Stratford and Forest Gate).

=== Museums ===
- North Woolwich Old Station Museum. Closed in 2008.
- Three Mills, a mill complex on the east bank of the River Lea. A trading site for nearly a thousand years, the House Mill was built in 1776 and was (and remains) the country's largest tide mill. It has been restored and contains much of its original machinery including four large waterwheels, millstones and grain chutes.

=== Markets ===
There are a number of local markets in the Borough, including Queen's Market, which the council was controversially seeking to redevelop. The proposal was successfully opposed by Friends of Queen's Market.

=== Parks and open spaces ===
80 hectares within the borough are designated as part of the Metropolitan Green Belt.

=== Performance ===
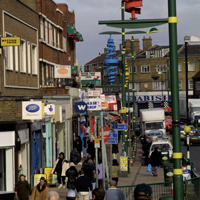
Green Street where the population is predominantly South Asian

- Stratford Circus Arts Centre, a community arts venue which presents theatre, dance, music, circus and comedy from around the world for communities in Newham and East London. The organisation works with schools and local groups in Newham to provide classes, workshops and outreach opportunities. Stratford Circus Arts Centre partners with Newham Council for Every Child a Theatre Goer which invites every year 6 child to a performance at the venue
- Theatre Royal Stratford East
- St Mark's Church, Silvertown The church was designed by Samuel Saunders Teulon. It was built between 1861 and 1862 after a cholera epidemic swept the district and local clergy appealed through the columns of The Times for funds to provide an architectural, as well as spiritual, beacon for the area. It is now the home of the Brick Lane Music Hall.

=== Shopping and exhibitions ===
- Queen's Market – an historic street market
- ICC London – ExCeL – International Conference Centre
- Gallions Reach Shopping Park
- Beckton Triangle Retail Park
- Beckton Retail Park
- Gateway Retail Park
- East Shopping Centre – Europe's first purpose-built boutique Asian shopping centre
- Green Street – a shopping street mostly catering for the Asian community
- Stratford Centre
- Westfield Shopping Centre, Stratford

=== Sport ===
- Newham was one of the six host boroughs for the 2012 Summer Olympics
- West Ham United F.C. plays its home matches at the London Stadium (formerly the Olympic Stadium) in Stratford
- The Newham and Essex Beagles Athletics Club has its headquarters at the London Marathon Community Track in Queen Elizabeth Olympic Park adjacent to the London Stadium.
- Clapton F.C., a non-league football club, plays at the Terence McMillan Stadium in Plaistow
- Clapton Community F.C., a fan-owned non-league football team in Forest Gate, playing at The Old Spotted Dog Ground
- Athletic Newham F.C., a non-league football club, plays at the Terence McMillan Stadium in Plaistow
- London APSA F.C., a non-league football club, plays at the Flanders Playing Fields in Napier Road, East Ham
- London Regatta Centre, a charitable organisation promoting water sports such as rowing and dragon boats, is in Beckton

=== Newspapers ===
The local newspaper is the Newham Recorder.

== Districts ==
See List of districts in the London Borough of Newham for the full list, including neighbourhoods or localities which form part of the areas listed below.

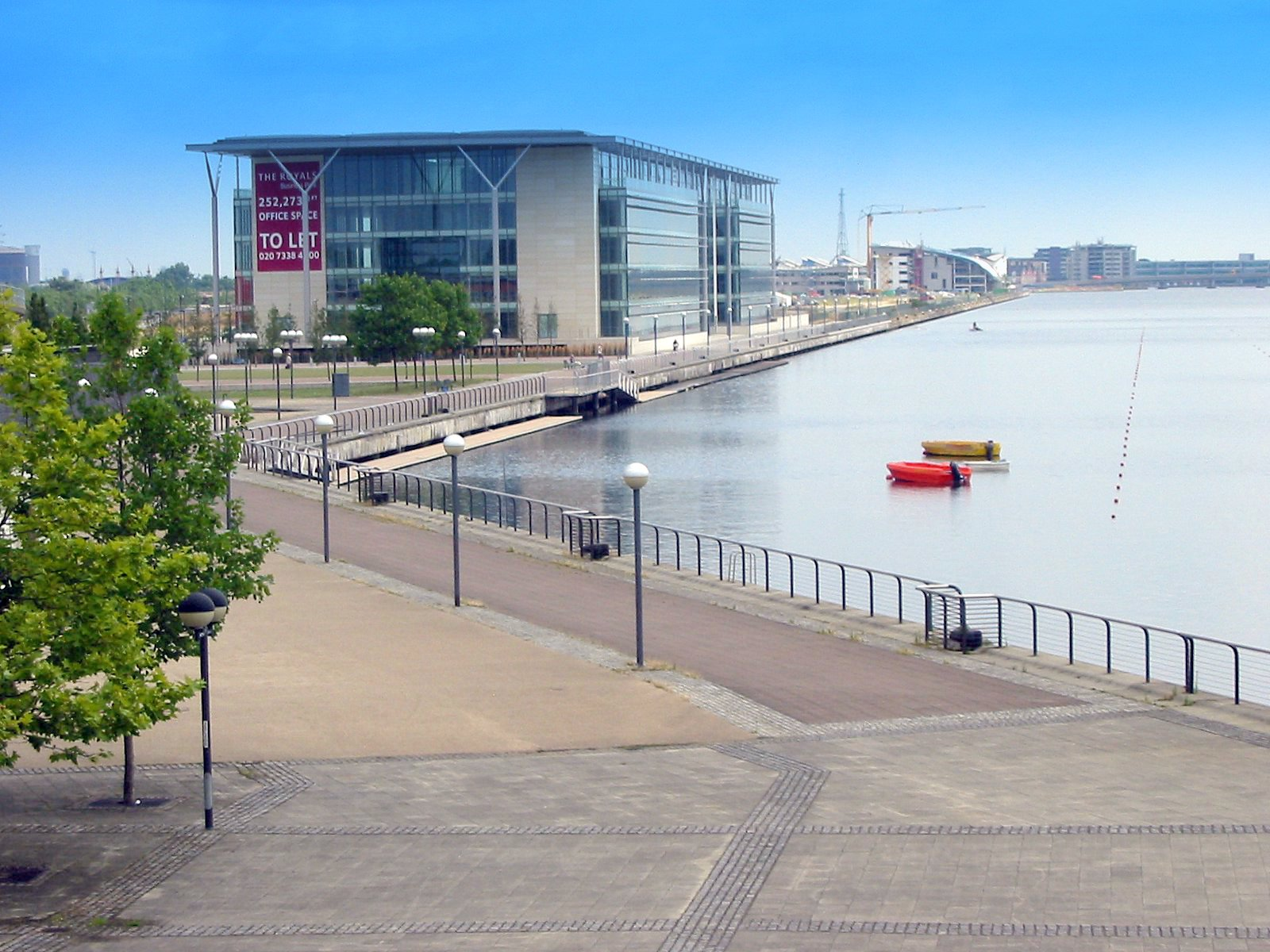
Building 1000 – Newham Council Headquarters

- Beckton
- Canning Town
- Custom House
- East Ham
- Forest Gate
- Little Ilford
- Manor Park
- North Woolwich
- Plaistow
- Royal Docks
- Silvertown
- Stratford
- Upton Park
- West Ham

== Parishes ==
The borough is covered by the following ecclesiastical parishes of the Church of England:

- Parish of the Divine Compassion, Plaistow and North Canning Town
  - St Martin's Church, Plaistow
  - St Mary's Church, Plaistow
  - St Philip and St James Church, Plaistow
  - St Matthias' Church, Canning Town
- St Luke's Church, Canning Town
- Church of the Ascension, Victoria Docks
- St John's Church, North Woolwich
- St Mark's Church, Beckton
- Parish of East Ham, Holy Trinity
  - St Bartholomew's Church, East Ham
  - St Mary Magdalene's Church, East Ham
  - St Alban's Church, Upton Park
  - St Edmund's Church, Forest Gate
- St George's and St Ethelbert's Church, East Ham
- St Paul's Church, East Ham
- Little Ilford
  - St Mary's Church, Little Ilford
  - St Michael's Church, Romford Road
- St Barnabas, Little Ilford
- Emmanuel Forest Gate, with St Peter's, Upton Cross
- St Mark's Church, Forest Gate
- St Saviour and St James, Forest Gate
- St Margaret with St Columba, Leytonstone
- St Paul and St James, Stratford
- St John with Christchurch, Stratford
- All Saints Church, West Ham

== Transport ==
Since the 1980s, public transport in Newham has undergone many upgrades and improvements are still continuing to this day.

The Docklands Light Railway (DLR) first opened in 1987, and was extended from Tower Hamlets through to Beckton in 1994. The network has undergone many extensions since, including to serve London City Airport, as well as Stratford International station in 2011 after its High Speed 1 link opened in late 2009. The Jubilee Line Extension was completed in 1999, including new or improved stations at Canning Town, West Ham and Stratford. The DLR network compensates for Newham's lack of tube stations, of which there are only six, in comparison with other London boroughs. The Crossrail scheme – opening as the Elizabeth line in 2022 – also delivered improved rail connections to several stations as it heads through the borough on an east west axis. Of the 28 stations in Newham, only 4 stations lack step free access – thanks to the recent age of many of the stations in the borough.

As a result of all the recent developments, the borough contains one of only two airports located within the Greater London boundary and currently the only railway station outside of central London that is served by high speed rail.

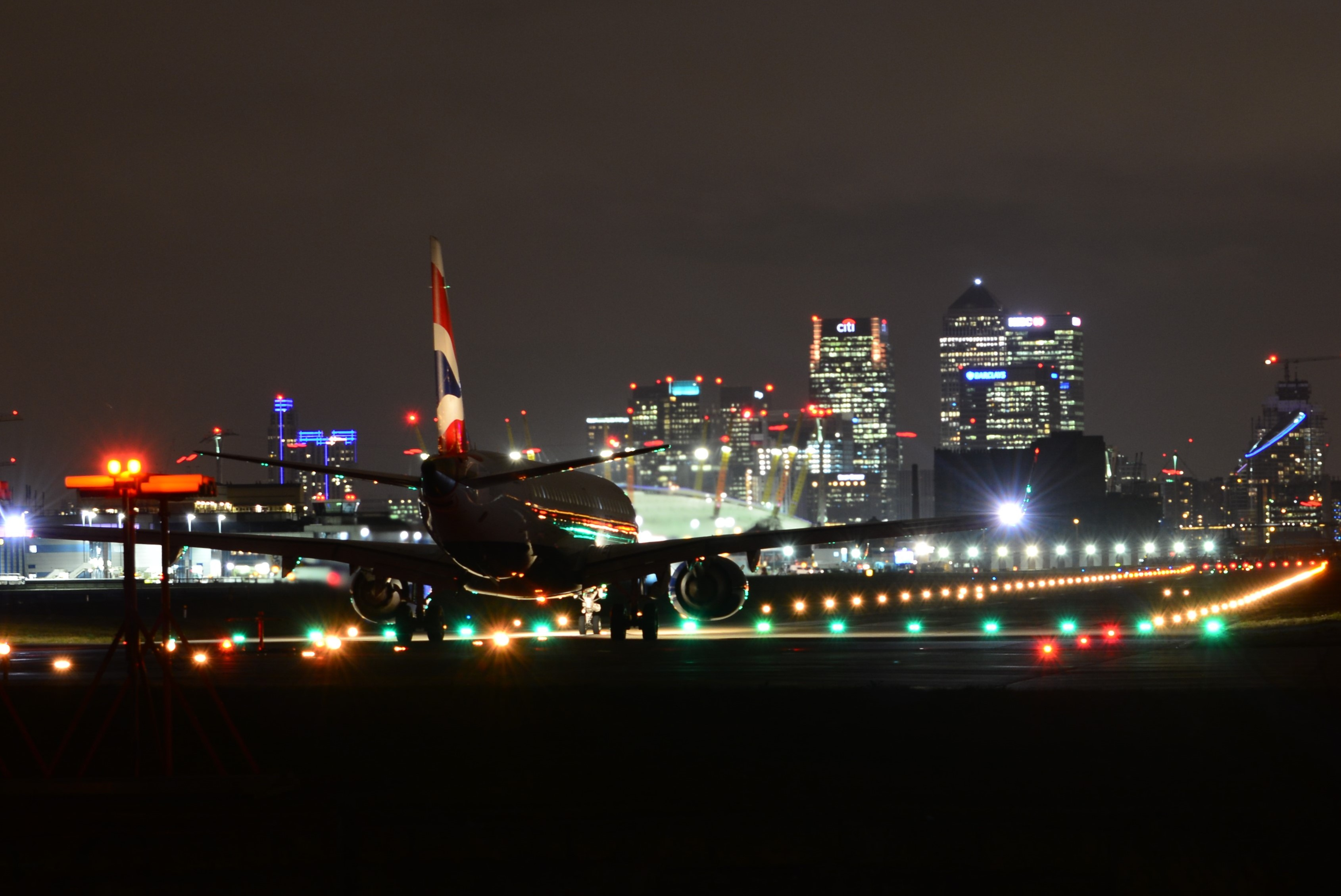
London City Airport is in Newham.

=== List of stations ===
- Abbey Road DLR station
- Beckton DLR station
- Beckton Park DLR station
- Cyprus DLR station
- Canning Town station – Jubilee line and DLR
- Custom House station - Elizabeth line and DLR
- East Ham tube station – District and Hammersmith & City lines
- Forest Gate railway station – Elizabeth line
- Gallions Reach DLR station
- King George V DLR station
- London City Airport DLR station
- Manor Park railway station – Elizabeth line
- Maryland railway station – Elizabeth line
- Plaistow tube station – District and Hammersmith & City lines
- Pontoon Dock DLR station
- Prince Regent DLR station
- Pudding Mill Lane DLR station
- Royal Albert DLR station
- Royal Victoria DLR station
- Star Lane DLR station
- Stratford station – Greater Anglia, c2c, Elizabeth line, Jubilee and Central lines, London Overground and DLR
- Stratford High Street DLR station
- Stratford International station – Southeastern, DLR
- Upton Park tube station – District and Hammersmith & City lines
- Wanstead Park railway station – London Overground
- West Ham station – c2c, Jubilee, District and Hammersmith & City lines, and DLR
- West Silvertown DLR station
- Woodgrange Park railway station – London Overground

=== Travel to work ===
In March 2011, the main forms of transport that residents used to travel to work were: underground, metro, light rail, tram, 23.0% of all residents aged 16–74; driving a car or van, 7.6%; bus, minibus or coach, 7.6%; train, 7.2%; on foot, 4.1%; work mainly at or from home, 1.4%; bicycle, 1.0%.

=== River services ===
- Woolwich Ferry
- Royal Wharf

=== Cable car ===
- London Cable Car

=== International services ===
- Dutchflyer rail-sea service via Stratford station to the Netherlands
- London City Airport
- Stratford International station (No Eurostar trains stop)
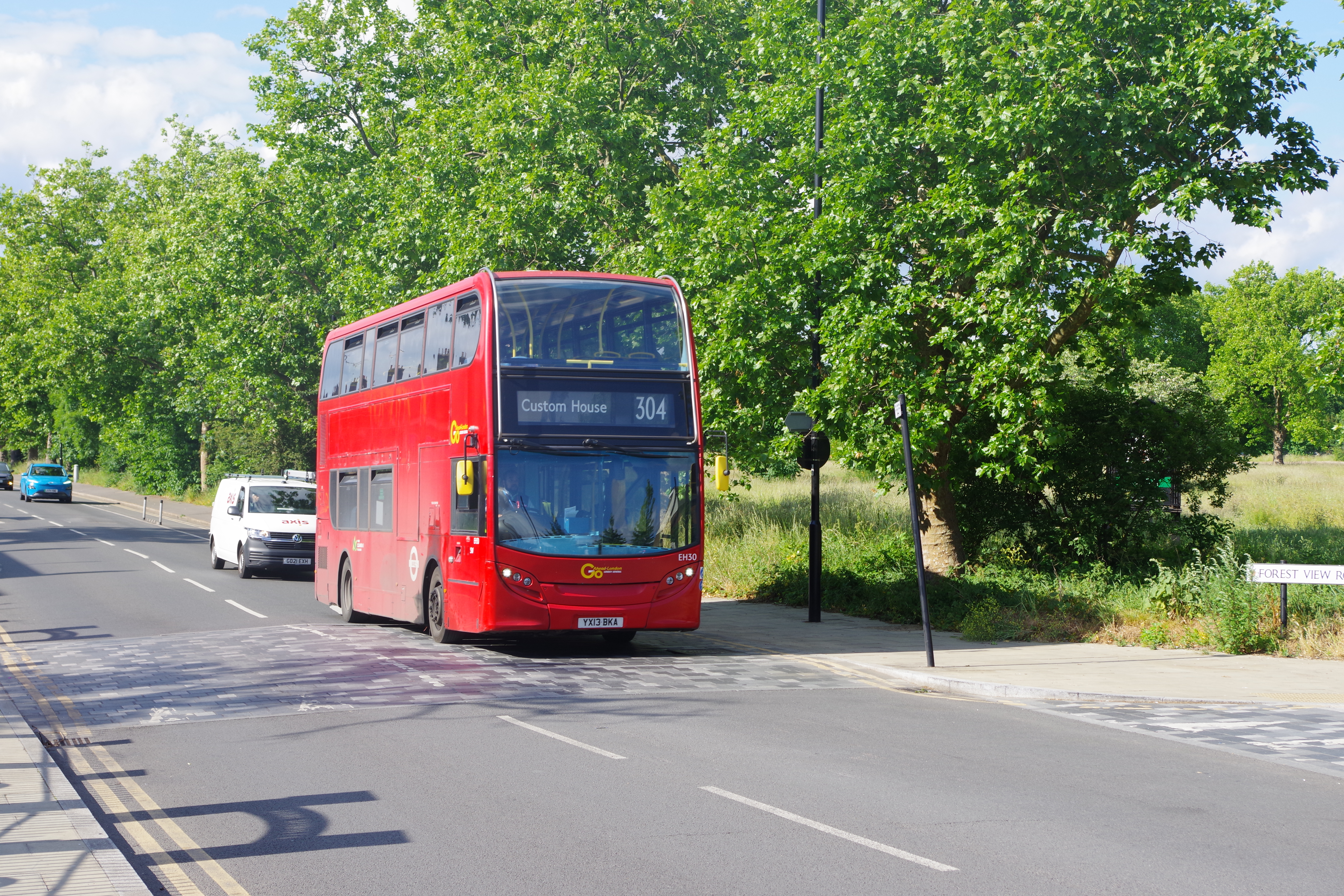
  Bus route 304 in Manor Park, Newham (June 2022)

=== Bus routes ===
Over 30 London Buses bus routes serve the London Borough of Newham, with main interchanges at Stratford, Stratford City and Beckton bus stations, with large bus interchanges also available at East Ham and Upton Park.

== Town twinning ==
Newham is twinned with:

- Kaiserslautern, Germany

== Coat of arms ==
The borough adopted West Ham's coat of arms, but with a motto adapted from that of East Ham.

The arms include the following elements:

- The crosier signified the Cistercian Stratford Langthorne Abbey.
- The sword and the red and yellow chevronells are taken from the arms of William de Montfitchet, a major local landowner and founder of the abbey.
- The crossed hammers represent the Thames Ironworks and Shipbuilding Company, once a major local employer.
- The ship in full sail represents the maritime trades and the area's links to the sea.
- The arms also include a sun rising in the east.

The borough's motto, "Progress with the People" is an English translation of East Ham's Latin "Progressio cum Populo".

== Freedom of the Borough ==
The following people and military units have received the Freedom of the Borough of Newham.

=== Individuals ===
- Sir Jack Petchey: 27 May 2010.
- Mark Noble: 15 December 2016.

=== Military units ===
- G Company 7th Battalion The Rifles: 23 June 2012.

== See also ==
- List of districts in the London Borough of Newham
- List of schools in Newham
- Newham parks and open spaces
- Newham Sixth Form College
- Newham College of Further Education
- Stratford Circus
- Stratford, London
- Stratford City
- Thames Gateway
- Rising East
