= St Michael's Church, Rutland Road =

Church in Greater London, England

Coordinates: 51.5403°N 0.0397°E

St Michael's Church, Rutland Road is a church in East Ham, east London, originally built for the Church of England. It was established as a mission church of St Stephen's Church, East Ham in 1895, with services held in Saxby Villas, Red Post Lane (now Katherine Road) until the completion of a temporary iron church in 1898. In 1912 a permanent church was built. This housed the congregation of St Stephen's after that church was damaged by bombing in 1940 and after that parish was dissolved in 1953 St Michael's was instead attached to St Edmund's Church. It closed as an Anglican church in 1971 and now houses a Romanian Orthodox church.
