= St John the Baptist's Church, East Ham =

Coordinates: 51.533491°N 0.053579°E

St John the Baptist's Church, East Ham, was a Church of England church dedicated to St John the Baptist in East Ham, east London. It was built in 1866 as a chapel of ease to St Mary Magdalene's Church, then still the main parish church for the area. In 1902 it was converted into a church hall for the new church of St Bartholomew's and in 1925 it was demolished.
