= St Stephen's Church, East Ham =

Former church in East Ham, London

Coordinates: 51.537925°N 0.034121°E

St Stephen's Church, East Ham, was a church on Green Street in East Ham, east London. Its nave and aisles were completed in 1887 and its chancel, north chapel, south chancel aisle, vestries and choir in 1894. It founded three mission churches - St Alban's Church, St Michael's Church, Rutland Road and St Cuthbert's Church, Florence Road.

It was renovated in 1938 but severely damaged two years later in the London Blitz - St Cuthbert's was also destroyed during the war. The congregation moved to St Michael's but post-war the decision was taken not to rebuild St Stephen's and St Cuthbert's and the former was demolished in 1954 and the parish merged into that of St Edmund's.
