= St Paul's Church, East Ham =

Church in Greater London, England

Coordinates: 51°32′21.512″N 0°3′46.76″E

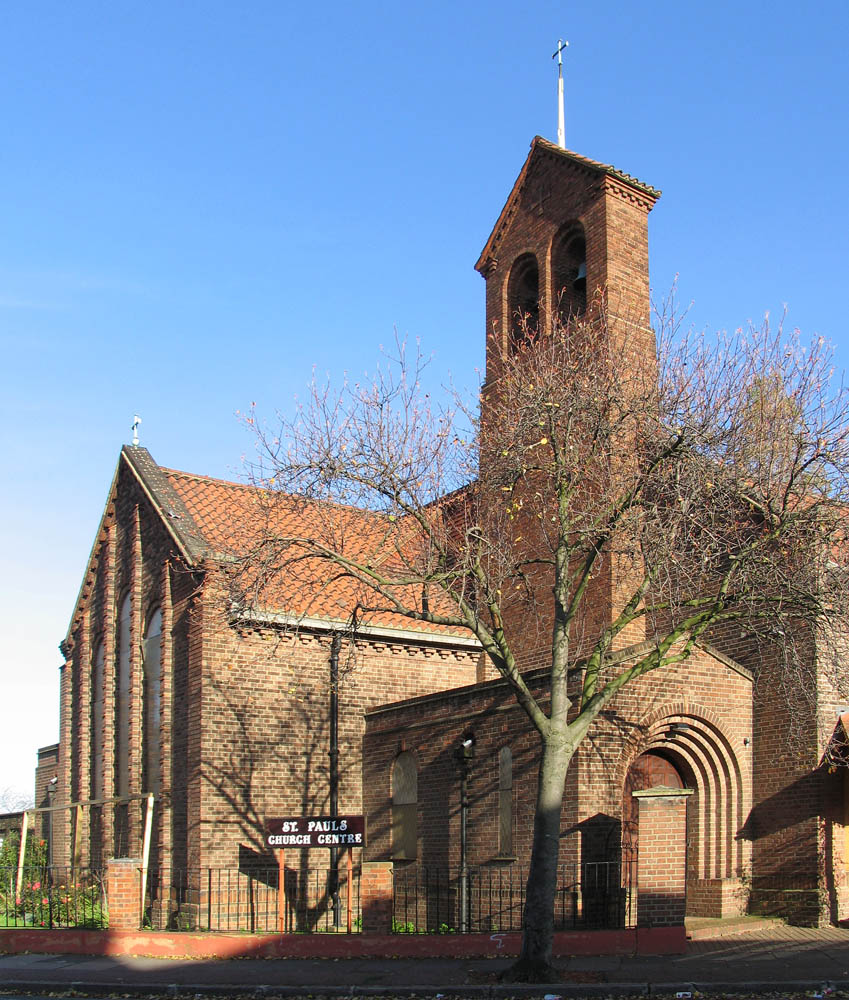
St Paul's Church.

St Paul's Church, East Ham or St Paul's Church, Burges Road is a Church of England parish church in East Ham, Newham, east London.

The church originated as a mission church of St Mary Magdalene's. Ynyr Burges (died 1792), Paymaster of the East India Company, had built up an estate in the area late in the 18th century, which his great-grandnephew Colonel Ynyr Burges began to develop as building land from about 1887 onwards. As part of this development, he gave land for the mission to build a temporary Mission Room (the present church hall), which opened on 24 May 1908. Three years later a Building Fund was established for the construction of a permanent church and in 1914 a small iron church hall was set up alongside the church.

The mission church was given a parish of its own in 1924 and on 11 April that year Kendrick W Sibley was made its first vicar. £2437 19 shillings and 10 pence had been raised by January 1931 and the diocese agreed that construction could begin on the permanent church, using Hammond and Miles of Ilford and re-using the temporary church's processional cross and stone font. The bells were recycled from a dismantled church at Wendle Lofts.

In 1932 the parish's advowson was vested in the bishop of Chelmsford and on 30 September 1933 the new permanent church was consecrated, with the original church becoming a church hall.
