= All Saints Church, East Ham =

Church in East Ham, London

Coordinates: 51.54911°N 0.04217°E

All Saints Church, East Ham is a Church of England church in East Ham, east London. It was set up around 1880 in an iron mission church (within the parish of Emmanuel Church) to meet the development of the Woodgrange Estate. This was replaced by a parish of its own with a permanent church in the Early English style on Romford Road in 1886.
