= St Michael and All Angels Church, Beckton Road =

Former church in East Ham, London

Coordinates: 51.515647°N 0.060587°E

St Michael and All Angels Church, Beckton Road, was a Church of England church in East Ham, east London. It opened as a mission of St Mary Magdalene's Church, East Ham in 1883 and immediately rebuilt after burning down three years later. A permanent church was built on a new site around 1906, funded by the Gas Light and Coke Company. A new mission district was formed for it about 1922, but the church was not rebuilt after bombing in 1941 during the London Blitz and ultimately the district was dissolved in 1952, to be merged back into St Mary's parish. St Michael's had also founded two mission churches of its own, St Mark's, Ferndale Street (c.1890) and St Andrew's, Roman Road (1934) - these both closed in 1952 when the district was dissolved.
