= Stratford Martyrs =

Group of Protestants burned at the stake in 1556 in England

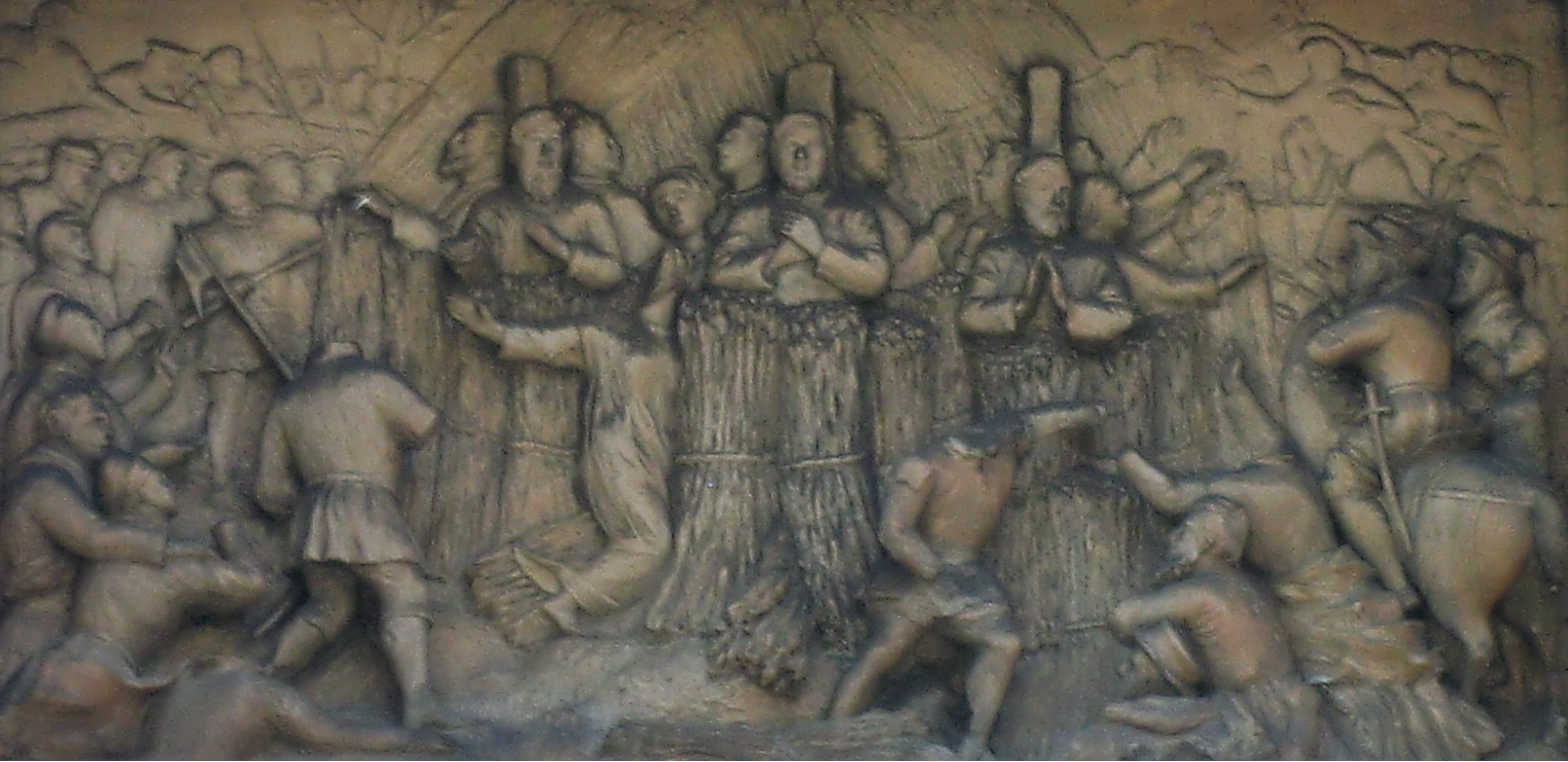
Frieze on the memorial to the Stratford Martyrs

The Stratford Martyrs were eleven men and two women who were burned at the stake together for their Protestant beliefs, either at Stratford-le-Bow, Middlesex or Stratford, Essex, both near London, on 27 June 1556 during the Marian persecutions.

== The martyrs ==
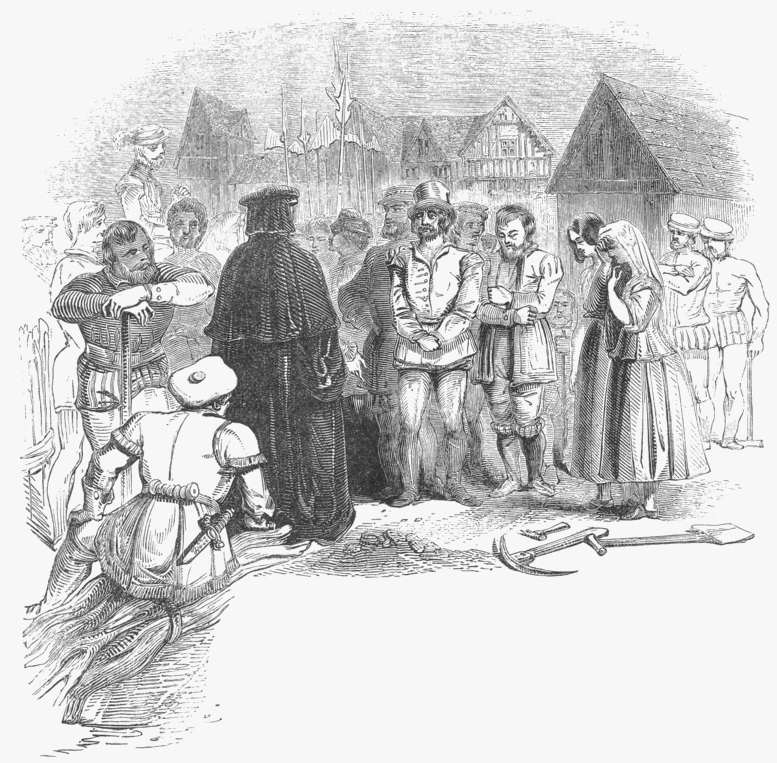
"The Thirteen Martyrs of Stratford-le-Bow" from a 19th-century engraving

A detailed description of the event is in John Foxe's book, The Acts and Monuments. Foxe lists those executed: Henry Adlington, a sawyer of Grinstead, Laurence Pernam, a smith of Hoddesdon, Henry Wye, a brewer of Stanford-le-Hope, William Halliwel, a smith of Waltham Holy Cross, Thomas Bowyer, a weaver of Great Dunmow, George Searles, a tailor of White Notley, Edmund Hurst, a labourer of Colchester, Lyon Cawch, a Flemish merchant of the City of London, Ralph Jackson, a servant of Chipping Ongar, John Derifall, a labourer of Rettendon, John Routh, a labourer of Wix, Elizabeth Pepper of Colchester who was pregnant, and Agnes George of West Bergholt. A further three men, Thomas Freeman, William Stannard, and William Adams, were given a dispensation by Cardinal Pole, the Archbishop of Canterbury, because they had recanted although Foxe is dubious about that. The 16 accused had been brought to Newgate in London from various parts of Essex and Hertfordshire. Beginning on 6 June 1556, at an ecclesiastical tribunal under the direction of Thomas Darbyshire, the chancellor of Edmund Bonner the Bishop of London, they were charged with nine counts of heresy, to which they all either assented or remained silent. All of them were condemned to death and later published a letter detailing their beliefs in rebuttal of a sermon that had been preached against them by John Feckenham, the Dean of St Paul's. On 27 June 1556, the remaining 13 were brought from London to Stratford, where the party was divided into two and held "in several chambers". Here, the sheriff unsuccessfully attempted to persuade each group to recant, by telling them falsely that the other group had already done so.

== Execution ==
The executions were said to have been attended by a crowd of 20,000. The exact place of the execution is unknown; the most likely site is thought to have been Fair Field in Bow (then known as Stratford-le-Bow), north of the present day Bow Church DLR station. An alternative suggested location is Stratford Green, much of which is now occupied by the University of East London Stratford Campus. This theory seems to date only from the erection of a monument to the martyrs in the nearby churchyard of the Parish Church of St John the Evangelist in 1879. According to Foxe, "eleven men were tied to three stakes, and the two women loose in the midst without any stake; and so they were all burnt in one fire".

== Martyrs' Memorial ==
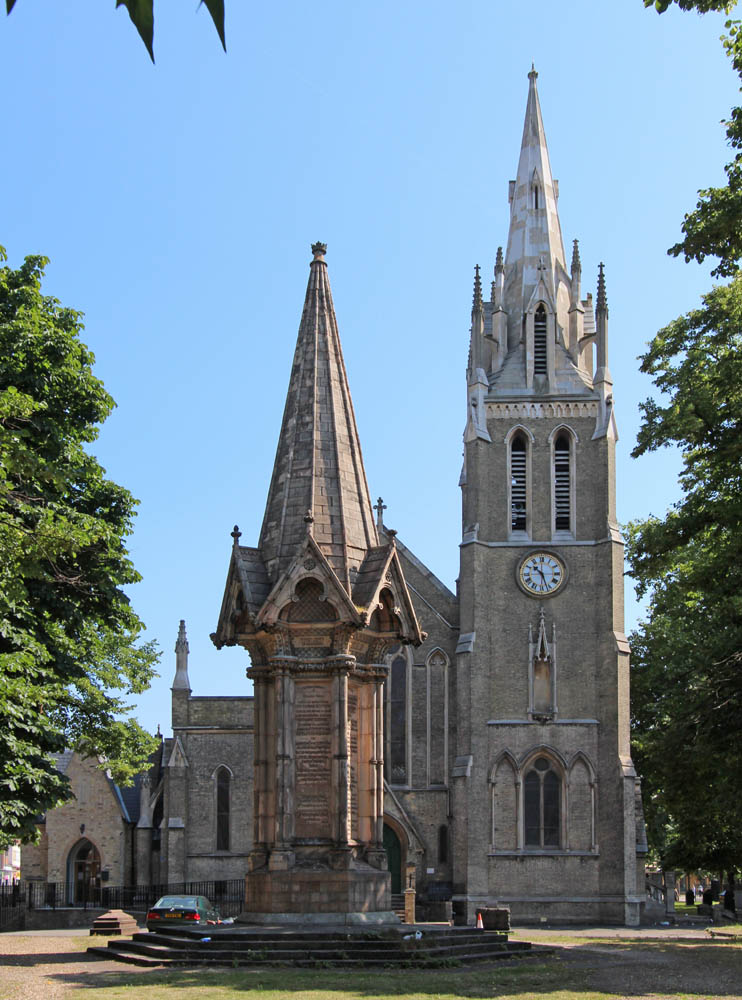
The Martyrs' Memorial in Stratford (with St John the Baptist Church in the background)

In 1879 a large monument was erected in St John's churchyard in Stratford Broadway, to commemorate the 13 and others who were executed or tortured in Stratford during the persecutions. The memorial is Grade II listed on the National Heritage List for England.

== See also ==
- List of Protestant martyrs of the English Reformation
