= St Thomas's Church, West Ham =

Church in London, England

Coordinates: 51.534596°N 0.004142°E

St Thomas's Church, West Ham, was a church in West Ham, East London. It originated around 1878 on Rokeby Street as a mission of All Saints Church, West Ham, initially in an iron building and then from 1889 in a brick one, which was assigned a parish from All Saints' in 1891. It was damaged by bombing, closed and finally demolished in 1957, though the parish existed until 1961, when it was merged back into that of All Saints.
