= Bill Kaine =

English footballer

Personal information
- Full name: William Edward John Charles Kaine
- Date of birth: 27 June 1900
- Place of birth: East Ham, England
- Date of death: 3 November 1968 (aged 68)
- Place of death: Beckenham, Kent
- Position: Goalkeeper

Senior career*
| Years | Team | Apps | (Gls) |
| – | Sterling Athletic | ? | |
| 1924 | West Ham United | 7 | |
| 1925 | Tottenham Hotspur | 11 | |
| 1926 | Luton Town | 0 | |
| 1927 | Bradford City | 0 | |
- * Club domestic league appearances and goals

William Edward John Charles Kaine (27 June 1900 – 3 November 1968) was an English professional footballer who played for Sterling Athletic, West Ham United, Tottenham Hotspur, Luton Town, and Bradford City.

== Football career ==
The goalkeeper joined West Ham United in 1924 and made seven appearances before signing for Tottenham Hotspur. He featured in 12 matches in all competitions for the Lilywhites. After leaving White Hart Lane, Kaine went on to play for Luton Town and Bradford City.

Kaine died in Beckenham in Kent on 3 November 1968.
