= List of people from the London Borough of Newham =

The following is a list of people who were born in the London Borough of Newham, or have dwelt within the borders of the modern borough, including Stratford, (in alphabetical order):

== Notable people associated with Newham ==
- Sha Yaa Bin Abraham-Joseph, better known as 21 Savage, rapper
- Ade Adepitan, British television presenter and wheelchair basketball player
- Chuba Akpom, footballer
- Chuks Aneke, footballer
- Tony Banks, Baron Stratford, Labour Party politician
- Yxng Bane, rapper and singer
- Jim Barrett, footballer
- Kieran Agard, footbatter
- Wally Bellett, footballer
- Honor Blackman, actress
- Reece Burke, footballer
- Clive Burr, musician
- Sol Campbell, ex-footballer and manager
- Charlie Colkett, footballer
- Vera Day, actress and glamour model
- Jermain Defoe, footballer
- Richard Digance, folk singer
- Kristian Digby, television presenter
- Danny Dyer, actor
- Stan Earle, footballer
- Idris Elba, actor
- Medy Elito, footballer
- Perry Fenwick, actor
- Bryan Forbes, actor, screenwriter, film producer
- Lancey Foux, rapper and singer
- Kojo Funds, rapper and singer
- Ernie Gregory, footballer
- Peter Grotier, footballer
- Walter Hancock, inventor
- Gerard Manley Hopkins, poet
- Michael Hector, football
- Luke Howard, meteorologist
- Chris Hughton, ex-footballer and manager
- Henry Hughton, ex-footballer with Crystal Palace and Leyton Orient
- J Hus, rapper
- Tony Jarrett, Olympic gold-medal sprint and hurdling athlete
- Matt Johnson, singer and songwriter
- Anna Kingsford, theosophist and author
- Kano, rapper and actor
- Ghetts, rapper
- Ezri Konsa, footballer
- Nina Frances Layard, archaeologist and poet
- Joan Littlewood, director of the Theatre Workshop at the Theatre Royal
- Dame Vera Lynn, singer
- Steve Marriott, musician and lead singer of The Small Faces and Humble Pie
- Stephen Mulhern, television presenter, entertainer, and former magician
- Anna Neagle, actress
- Dawn Neesom, journalist
- Malachi Napa, footballer
- Mark Noble, footballer and captain of West Ham United
- Christine Ohuruogu, Olympic gold-medal winning sprinter
- Godfrey Poku, footballer
- Dominic Poleon, footballer
- Tony Rivers, singer
- Steve John Shepherd, actor
- Gwyneth Strong, actor
- Tinchy Stryder, rapper
- Crazy Titch, rapper
- Tony Way, actor
- David Webb, footballer
- Bert Weedon, guitarist
- Vanessa White, singer with The Saturdays
- Rob Whiteman, public servant, CEO of CIPFA
- Benjamin Zephaniah, dub poet
- Arnold Schwarzenegger, Trained as a weightlifter in Forest Gate.

Note that William Shakespeare did not come from Stratford, Newham, but from Stratford-upon-Avon, which is known simply as "Stratford" to many people.
