= Emmanuel Church, Forest Gate =

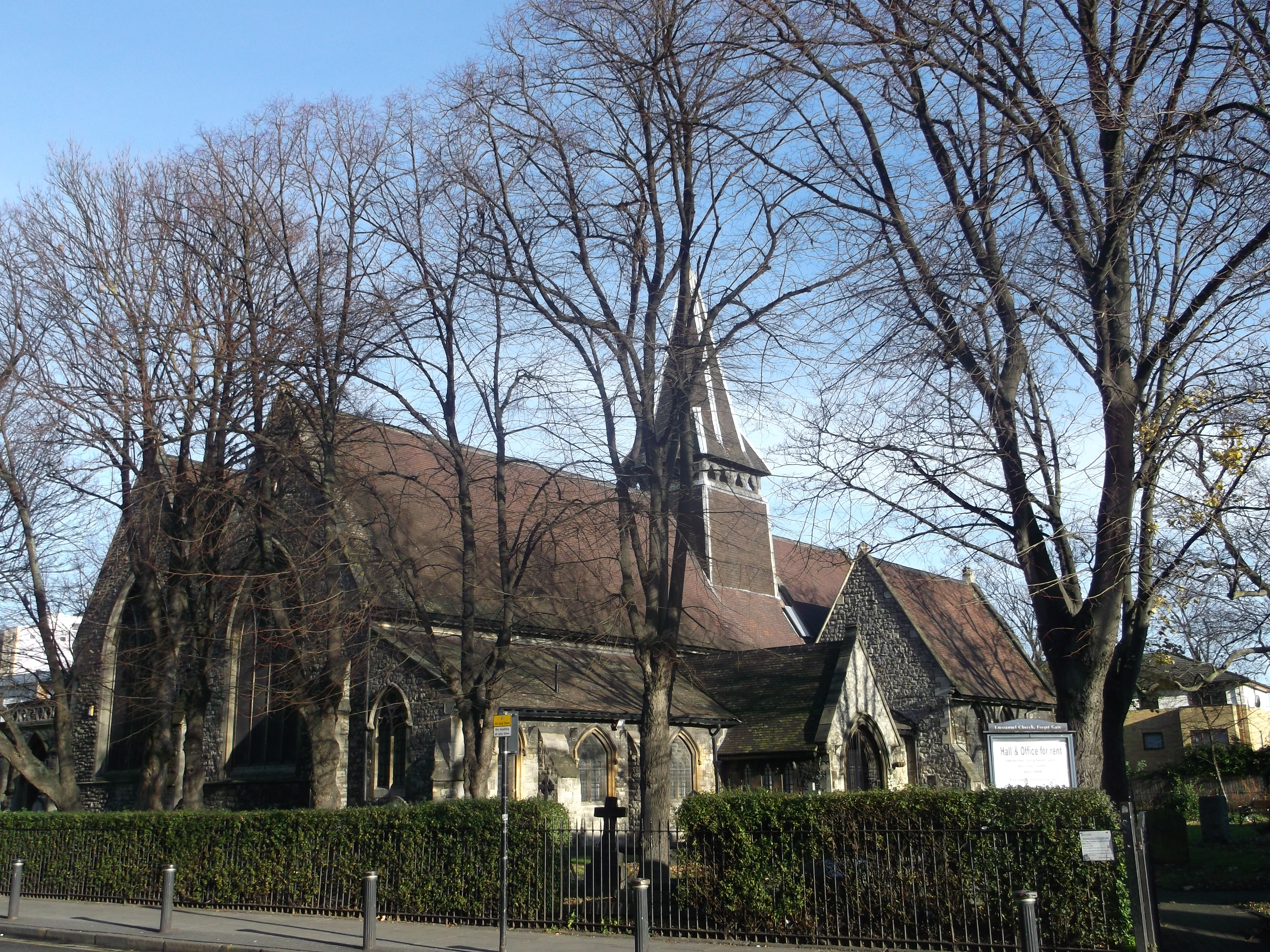
- Emmanuel Church, Forest Gate.
- Emmanuel Church, Forest Gate
- 51°32′46.338″N 0°1′34.724″E
- OS grid reference: TQ 40608 84985
- Location: Forest Gate, Newham, London
- Country: England
- Denomination: Church of England
- Website: Emmanuel Church, Forest Gate

History
- Dedication: 1852

Administration
- Archdiocese: Canterbury
- Diocese: Chelmsford
- Archdeaconry: West Ham
- Deanery: Newham
- Parish: Emmanuel with St Peter's, Upton Cross

Emmanuel Church, Forest Gate is a Church of England church in Forest Gate, east London. It was built in the Decorated Gothic variant of the neo-Gothic style in 1852 to designs by George Gilbert Scott and a new parish formed for it from parts of All Saints Church, West Ham and St Mary Magdalene's Church, East Ham. A north aisle was added in 1890. Bomb damage from the London Blitz was repaired. It was Grade II listed in 1984.

The church also set up the mission churches of St Saviour's Church, Forest Gate in 1880 and St Mark's Church, Forest Gate (which gained a permanent building between 1893 and 1898 and a parish of its own (using parts of the parishes of Emmanuel and All Saints) in 1894. In 1881 part of its parish was joined with parts of those of All Saints Church, West Ham and St John's Church, Stratford to form a parish for St James' Church, Forest Gate.

In 2023 a controversial clearing of headstones and monuments was undertaken by smashing them up and removing the debris, with financial support from the Newham Council. They did not ask for public comment on the decision but deferred to the Church authorities. The vicar was quoted as saying it was" 'a place littered with old graves' and they made the church look abandoned.
