= St Matthew's Church, West Ham =

Church in West Ham, London

Coordinates: 51.5432°N 0.0146°E

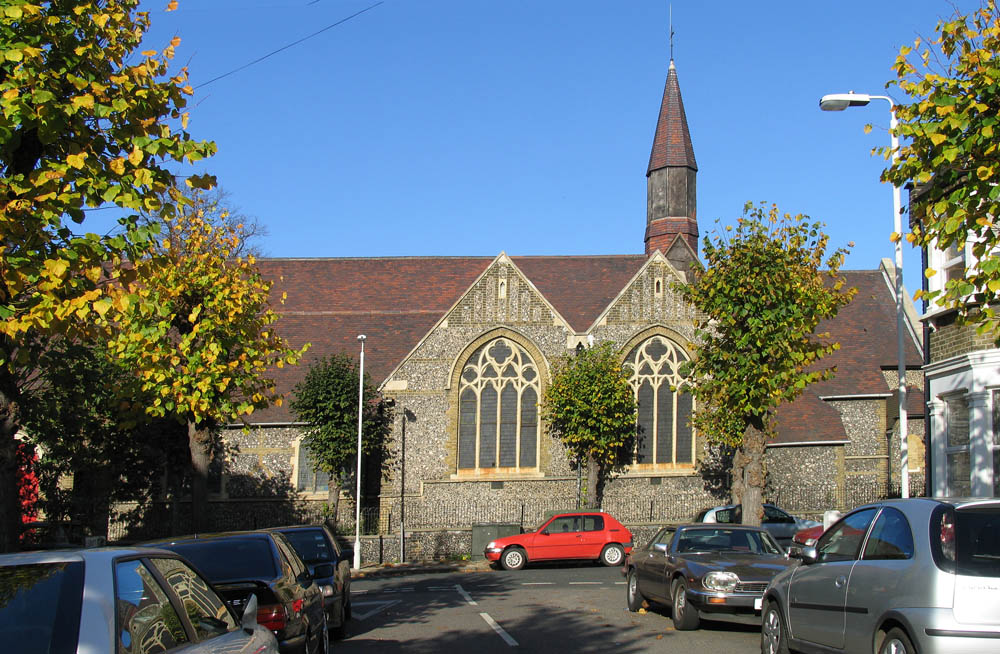
St Matthew's Church

St Matthew's Church is a Church of England church on Dyson Road in West Ham, east London. It originated in 1891 as a mission of All Saints Church, West Ham, designed to serve the area between West Ham Park and Romford Road. A permanent building was put up in 1896 and a separate parish formed the following year. It opened a mission of its own around 1900 in Vicarage Lane, which was destroyed by the London Blitz.
