= St Barnabas' Church, Manor Park =

Coordinates: 51°32′37″N 0°03′19″E

St Barnabas Church
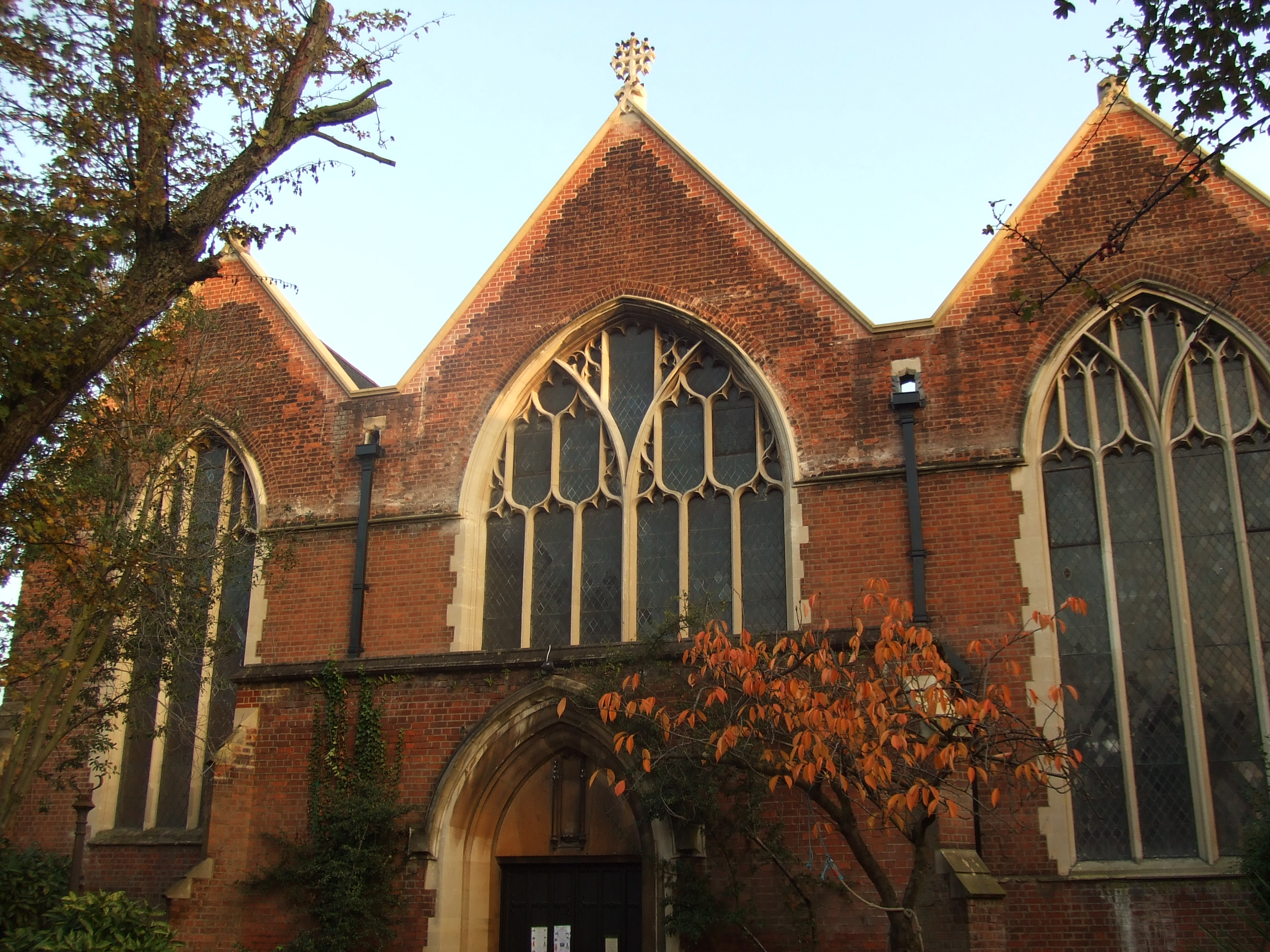
- St Barnabas Church
- Location: London
- Country: England
- Denomination: Anglican

History
- Status: Church
- Dedication: Saint Barnabas
- Dedicated: 1909
- Consecrated: 1900
- Events: Major renovation works, completed 2018

Architecture
- Functional status: Active
- Heritage designation: Grade II listed building
- Architect: Ninian Comper
- Architectural type: Gothic Revival

Specifications
- Materials: 'London red' brick

Administration
- Diocese: Chelmsford
- Archdeaconry: West Ham
- Deanery: Newham
- Parish: Little Ilford

St Barnabas is an Anglican parish church in Manor Park, London, built in the Gothic Revival style. It was designed by Ninian Comper in partnership with William Bucknall and built to serve the new residential neighbourhood of Manor Park. It is Grade II listed.

Building began in 1900 and was completed in 1909. The church is built from red brick with stone copings and window tracery. It has a triple-gabled west front, and arched buttresses along the north side. The interior has late-gothic style windows and measured arches in the nave. It includes two 'Comper angel' candle sconces, distinctive door handles and locks, a carved stone font, 17th century pulpit, and 16th century bell. The stained glass window was added by Comper in 1954 and features his signature strawberry motif.

A process of structural restoration was completed in 2016. This was funded by various bodies including the Heritage Lottery Fund and English Heritage (now Historic England). Prior to this, it was on the Heritage at Risk Register.

During the 1970s initial planning meetings for Crisis at Christmas were held in a room in the vicarage, and the church was used as a night shelter.

Today, St Barnabas is located in one of the most multi-ethnic and culturally diverse parishes in the United Kingdom. The church is used for traditional services and social events, and by community groups reflecting the diversity of the area.
