= William Davies (palaeontologist) =

British palaeontologist (1814–1891)

William Davies, FGS (13 July 1814 – 13 February 1891) was a British palaeontologist.

== Life ==
Davies was born on 13 July 1814 at Holywell, Flintshire. His father was Thomas Davies and his mother was Elizabeth Turner. He studied botany and in 1843 began work at the Geology Department of the British Museum, first also in the field of mineralogy, later specialising in vertebrate palaeontology. On 1 April 1846 he joined the Survey as a Fossil Collector. Davies assisted Sir Antonio Brady in his work on collecting Pleistocene mammal fossils, and Brady acknowledged his debt to Davies in Catalogue of Pleistocene Mammalia from Ilford, Essex (1874). Excavating a large mammoth skull, Davies used the innovation of surrounding the fossil, in the field, with plaster of Paris, reinforced by iron bars. In 1874 he salvaged the Dacentrurus holotype. Davies was awarded the inaugural Murchison Medal from the Geological Society of London in 1873, and was made a fellow (FGS) in 1877. In 1875, he was made an Assistant, responsible for the entire fossil collection of the museum, and in 1880 was promoted Assistant First Class. In 1880, Davies supervised the transfer of the museum's collections to new buildings in the Natural History Museum.

Davies was very active in the collecting and mounting of fish fossils. He trained the fish expert Arthur Smith Woodward. Davies during his life published fifteen scientific papers. The dinosaur Thecospondylus daviesi was named after him.

Davies retired in 1887, and died at his home at Labdens, Colliers End, Hertford, on 13 February 1891. Even after his retirement he remained active in the field and proofread many palaeontological publications. It was said of William Davies that: "his extensive knowledge was ever at the service of others, for he was one of those men who cared more for the advancement of science than of himself."

== Family ==
Davises married twice, and had two children (a son and daughter) by his first wife. His son, Thomas Davies (1837–1892), became a mineralogist, editor of the Mineralogical Magazine, and like his father worked at the British Museum.
