= All Saints Church, West Ham =

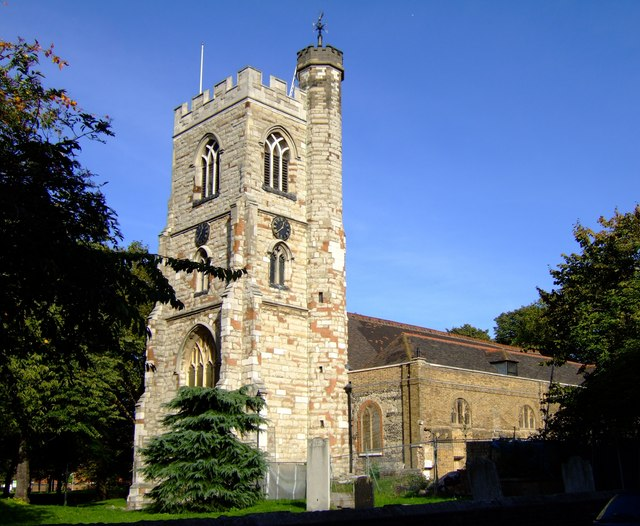
- All Saints Church, West Ham
- 51°32′11″N 0°0′31″E
- OS grid reference: TQ 39412 83862
- Location: West Ham, Newham, London
- Country: England
- Denomination: Church of England
- Website: www.westhamchurch.org.uk

History
- Founded: 12th century

Administration
- Archdiocese: Canterbury
- Diocese: Chelmsford
- Archdeaconry: West Ham

Clergy
- Vicar(s): Al Gordon, Steve Opie

All Saints Church is a parish church in West Ham, an area in east London. It has been a Grade I listed building since 1984.

== History ==
=== Medieval and Tudor ===
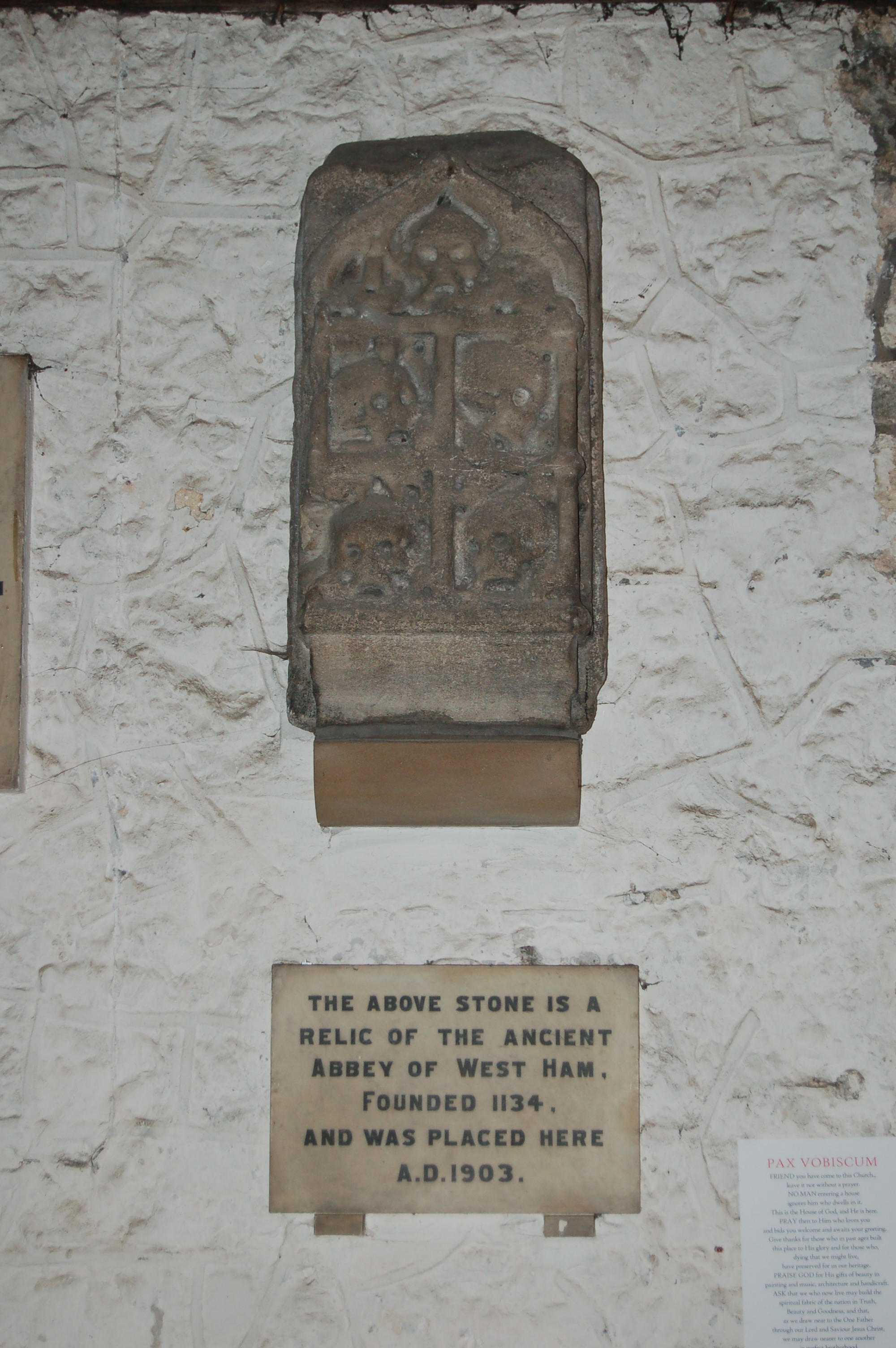
There are few traces of Stratford Langthorne Abbey. Shown is the keystone from the charnel house door, now in All Saints.

In the medieval era the church's parish included all of West Ham, with the one exception of the 24 acres within Stratford Langthorne Abbey's precincts, which formed a separate parish of St Mary and All Saints until the abbey was dissolved, that parish's church was destroyed and the parish itself merged into All Saints.

There has been a building on the site since at least the late 12th century - the three blocked clerestory windows on either side of the present building's nave date to that time. One of the founding endowments for the Abbey was land that had belonged to "Ranulph the priest", implying the existence of a parish church. The first concrete reference is a charter of 1181-82 by Henry II of England which confirmed the church of West Ham to the abbey. Gilbert Foliot, bishop of London also assigned a vicar to the parish church around the same time. The building contains a relief and possibly the remains of a font from the Abbey.

The nave was largely rebuilt halfway through the 13th century, adding five-bay arcades on the north and south sides. Its crossing was demolished around 1400 to add two bays to the nave's east end - the chancel arch was rebuilt and the west tower added at the same time. The abbey acquired the parish by 1334 and held onto it until the crown took it over after the Dissolution. A north chapel was added in mid 15th century, closely followed by a south chapel. Many of the windows in the north aisle seem to date to the late 15th century, implying another rebuilding in that area at that time, whilst wall paintings found in the nave during 19th century restorations probably also date to the 15th century. Around 1547 the churchwardens sold some of the church's communion plate and a property in Stratford to fund a rebuilding of the north chapel in brick, without the parish' permission - this included a turret for a stairwell into a rood screen on its north side. The Protestant Thomas Rose was made its vicar in 1552.

=== 18th and 19th centuries ===
One of the present building's three fonts was added in 1707. In 1710 a west gallery was added, with an organ installed in it 21 years later. South and north galleries were added in 1727 and 1735 respectively. In 1763 the west gallery was rebuilt and in 1788-90 the pulpit altered. A long south porch had also been added by 1799, which survived until sometime in the 19th century. The south aisle, the south chapel and the chancel's east wall were all refaced with yellow stock brick in 1800-1803 and Thomas Holbrook provided a set of the royal arms for the church's east end in 1804.

The parish's population was growing and all three galleries were expanded again in 1821–1824 to cope with the increased congregations. Even so, an 1827 account stated that only 12% of the parish's population could be seated. Chapels of ease began to be added to the parish, such as St Mary's Church, Plaistow in 1830 and St John's Church, Stratford in 1834 - these both later became parishes in their own right in 1844, taking parts of what had been All Saints parish, whilst the new parish church of Christ Church, Stratford also took part of All Saints parish on its foundation in 1852. Another part of All Saints parish was split off to join part of Emmanuel parish as a new parish for St Mark's Church, Forest Gate in 1894.

George Dyson and George Gilbert Scott rebuilt All Saints in 1847–1849, replacing the box pews with modern pews that allowed for more free sittings and probably altering the old nave dormers into their present configuration. Scott was called in again in 1865–1869, removing the west gallery, inserting new windows and designing a new reredos. A second larger font was added to the nave's west end in 1869. Further restorations and alterations followed in 1879-1880 and 1892, removing the north and south galleries. All Saints also founded the mission churches of St Thomas's around 1878 (which took part of All Saints parish in 1891 and was merged back into All Saints' parish in 1961) and St Matthew's Church, West Ham in 1891. Part of All Saints parish was joined with parts of those of St John's Church, Stratford and Emmanuel Church, Forest Gate to form a new parish for St James' Church, Forest Gate.

=== Today ===
Two curiosities are worth noting in the present church: the baptismal font, dated 1707, which bears the name of three churchwardens instead of the usual two (the ancient parish was once divided into three wards and the custom continues); and the other is the clock in the tower, made in 1857 to Lord Grimthorpe's design, and the prototype of Big Ben.
