= St Bartholomew's Church, East Ham =

Church in East Ham, London

Coordinates: 51°31′57.066″N 0°3′8.271″E

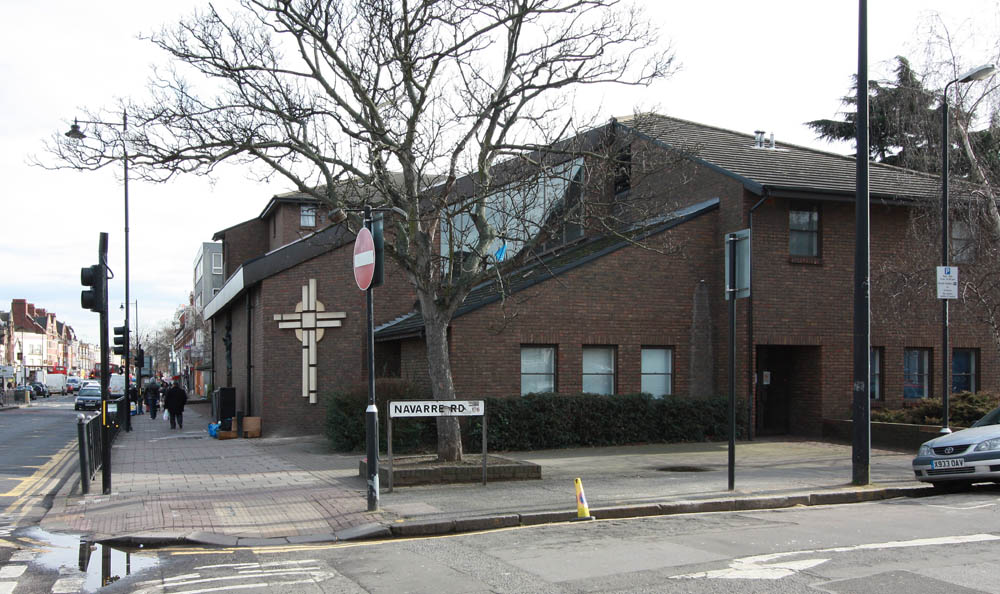
St Bartholomew, Barking Road, East Ham

St Bartholomew's Church, East Ham is a Church of England church on Barking Road in East Ham, east London dedicated to Bartholomew the Apostle.

It was built in 1902 to replace St John the Baptist's Church, which became its parish hall. Designed by Micklethwaite & Somers Clarke, it had a south aisle added in 1910. It was gutted by bombing in 1941 and a wooden hut was erected for worship within its shell, becoming known as 'St. Bartholomew-in-the-ruins', until it burned down in 1947. Services moved to the vestry then in 1948 to St John's Institute. The old church's south aisle was restored in 1949, followed by the rest of the church in 1953. It now forms part of the East Ham Team Parish (also known as the Parish of the Holy Trinity) alongside St Edmund's, St Mary Magdalene's and St Alban's.
