= Christ Church, Stratford =

Coordinates: 51.534970°N 0.005574°W

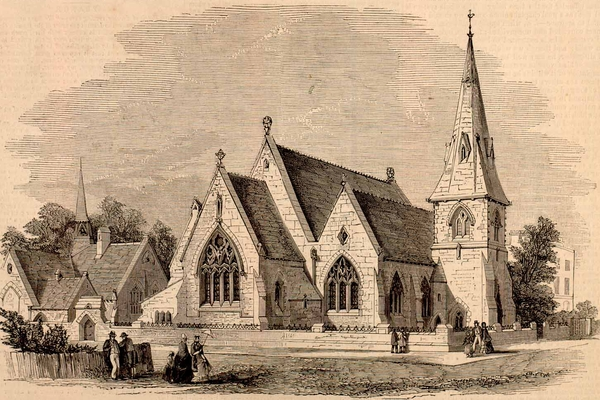
Christ Church, Stratford

Christ Church, Stratford was a Church of England church on the corner of Union Street and High Street in Stratford, London. It was built in 1852 to serve the Stratford Marsh area and consecrated on 15 May that year. On 10 November 1852 it was assigned a separate parish, taken from that of All Saints Church, West Ham. The costs of construction and purchasing the site were partly met by Thomas Curtis. In 1882 it opened a mission on Ward Road, for which the church of St Aidan was built – it was begun in 1895, suffered bomb damage in the London Blitz and was closed in 1944. Christ Church celebrated its centenary in 1952 but was merged into the parish of St John's Church, Stratford in 1961 – the church site was bought by the local council and the building finally demolished in 1975, though the site remained undeveloped until works for the 2012 Olympics.
