= Antonio Brady =

English naturalist (1811–1881)

Sir Antonio Brady (10 November 1811 – 12 December 1881) was an English naturalist, social reformer and British Admiralty official.

Brady was born at Deptford on 10 November 1811, being the eldest son of Anthony Brady of the Deptford victualling yard, then storekeeper at the Royal William victualling yard, Plymouth, by his marriage, on 20 December 1810, with Marianne, daughter of Francis Perigal and Mary Ogier.

He was educated at Colfe's School, Lewisham, and then entered the Civil Service as a junior clerk in the Victoria victualling yard, Deptford, on 29 November 1828, and, having served there and at Plymouth and Portsmouth, was, through the recommendation of Sir James Graham, promoted to headquarters at Somerset House as a second-class clerk in the accountant-general's office on 26 June 1844. He was gradually promoted until in 1864 he became registrar of contracts, and having subsequently assisted very materially in reorganising the office, he was made the first superintendent of the admiralty new contract department on 13 April 1869, when an improved salary of £1,000 a year was allotted to him. He held this appointment until 31 March 1870, when he retired on a special pension. He was knighted by The Queen at Windsor on 23 June 1870.

After his retirement Sir Antonio devoted himself to social, educational, and religious reform. Having taken a great interest in the preservation of Epping Forest for the people, he was appointed a judge in the verderer's court for the forest of Epping. He was associated with church work of all kinds. He published in 1869 The Church's Works and its Hindrances, with suggestions for Church Reform. The establishment of the Plaistow and Victoria Dock Mission, the East London Museum at Bethnal Green, and the West Ham and Stratford Dispensary was in a great measure due to him.

Cast of the mammoth skull found by Brady in Ilford

Brady was a member of the Ray, the Palæontographical, and Geological Societies. As far back as 1844, his attention was attracted to the deposits of brickearth in valley of the Roding at Ilford, within a mile of his residence. Encouraged by Professor Owen, he began collecting a number of mammalian remains in the brickearths of the Thames Valley, including tiger, wolf, bear, elephant, rhinoceros, horse, elk, stag, bison, ox, and hippopotamus skeletons. His collection of Pleistocene mammalia is now in the Natural History Museum. Most notable in the collection is the Ilford mammoth skull, which is the most complete mammoth skull ever found in Britain. The skull is on display in the Hintze Hall of the Natural History Museum. A resin cast of the skull is on display in Redbridge Central Library in Ilford. In his Catalogue of Pleistocene Mammalia from Ilford, Essex, 1874, printed for private circulation only, Brady acknowledges his indebtedness to Mr. William Davies, F.G.S., his instructor in the art of preserving fossil bones.

He died suddenly at his residence, Maryland Point, Forest Lane, Stratford, on 12 December 1881. He was buried in the churchyard of St John's, Stratford, on 16 December. His marriage with Maria, eldest daughter of George Kilner of Ipswich, took place on 18 May 1837, and by her, who survived him, he left a son, the Rev. Nicholas Brady, rector of Wennington, Essex, and two daughters.
