= St James' Church, Forest Gate =

Former church in Forest Gate, London

Coordinates: 51.548219°N 0.015093°E

St James' Church, Forest Gate was a church in Forest Gate, east London. Its origins lay in an iron building constructed around 1870 to serve a conventional district. A parish was formed for it in 1881 from those of Emmanuel Church, All Saints and St John's and its permanent church completed the following year, with an organ moved from St Matthew's Church, Friday Street. The church was demolished in 1964 and for two years its congregation worshiped in the Durning Hall Community Centre's chapel until the parish was merged with that of St John's. A new church was built for the St James' congregation at northern end of St James Road in 1968. The congregation finally moved to St Paul's Church, Stratford in 2014, though the area that had formerly been St James' parish was instead transferred from St John's to St Saviour's the same year.
