= St Alban's Church, Upton Park =

Church in Upton Park, London, England

Coordinates: 51°32′0.034″N 0°2′40.578″E

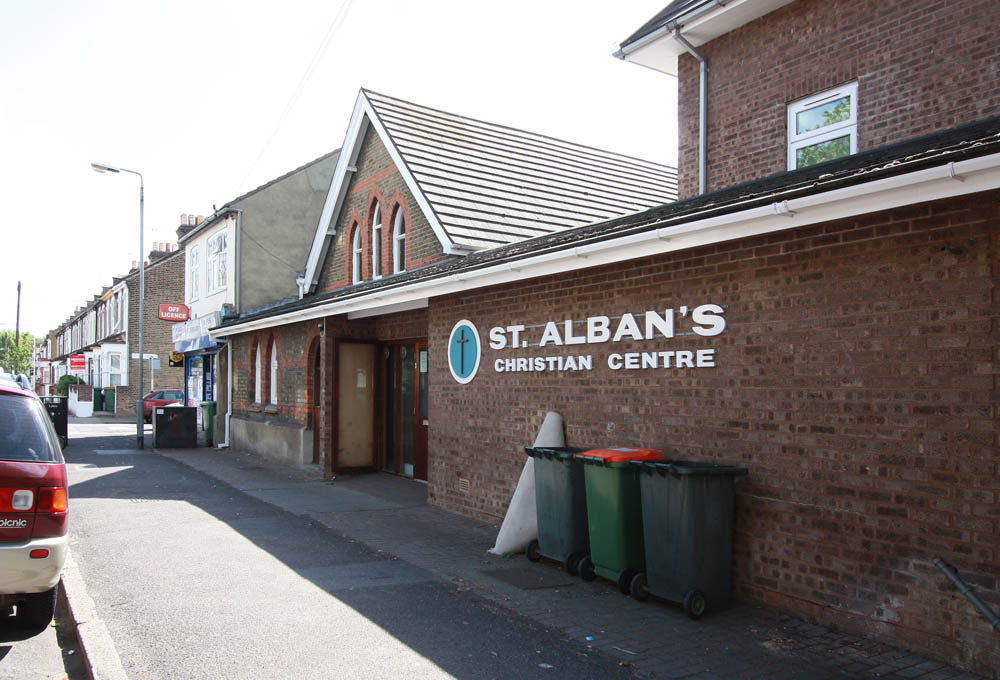
St Alban's Christian Centre, Wakefield Street

St Alban's Church, Upton Park is a Church of England church in the Upton Park area of East Ham in east London, England, dedicated to Saint Alban. It was founded by St Stephen's Church as a mission church on Boleyn Road in the Upton Park area around 1889, replaced by a small brick church on Wakefield Street in 1897. It was given a parish of its own in 1903, in which year the nave and aisle of a new permanent church on the opposite side of the same street were completed. Vestries, a Lady Chapel and chancel were added in 1934. Damaged by the London Blitz in 1940, it was repaired in 1949 and now forms part of the East Ham Team Parish (also known as the Parish of the Holy Trinity) alongside St Mary Magdalene's Church, St Bartholomew's Church and St Edmund's Church.
