= St John's Church, Stratford =

Church in Stratford, London, England

Coordinates: 51°32′31″N 0°00′11″E

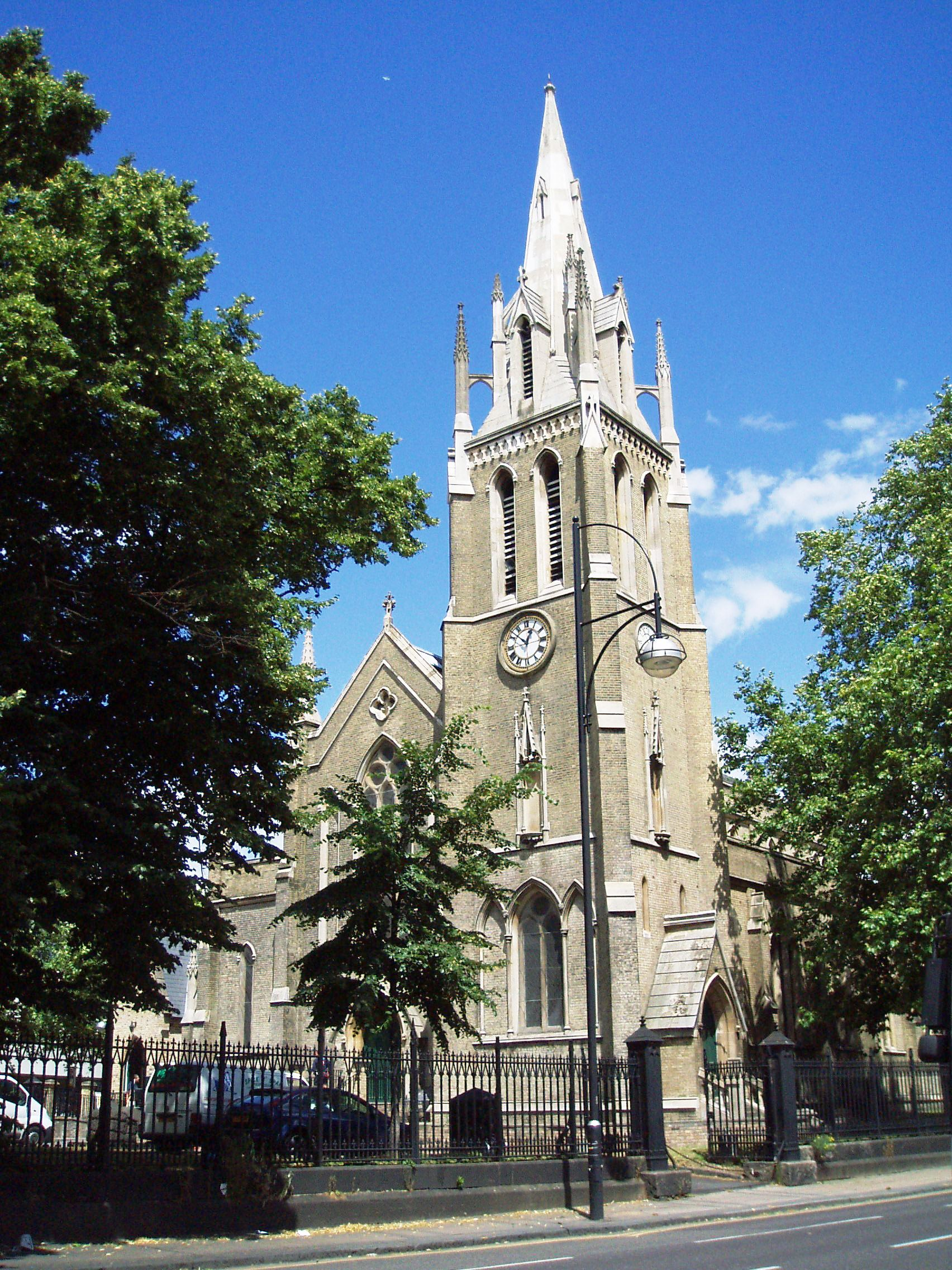
St John's Church in Stratford Broadway

St John's Church or the Church of Saint John the Evangelist is the parish church in Stratford, London, standing on Stratford Broadway, the main thoroughfare.

The site was previously home to a "Forest Prison" that incarcerated those who committed offences against the Royal Forest of Waltham, which is now known as Epping Forest. The gaol was built around 1620 and the building remained until 1827.

The church was built between 1832 and 1834 by Edward Blore in the Early English style using grey brick. The most notable feature is a three-stage tower, surmounted by a spire which is supported with flying buttresses. It is a Grade II Listed building. It was built as a chapel of ease to save worshippers the journey to the ancient parish church of All Saints West Ham; St John's Stratford became a separate ecclesiastical parish in 1844. The poet Gerard Manley Hopkins was baptised in the church as an infant in August 1844.

Part of St John's parish was split off in 1865 to provide a parish for St Paul's Church, Stratford, previously a mission church. In 1881 another part of St John's parish was also joined to parts of the parishes of All Saints and Emmanuel Church to form a new parish for the church of St James' Church, Forest Gate. The naturalist and social reformer Antonio Brady is buried in the churchyard in 1881; an extension to the chancel of the church was constructed in his memory in 1884. A memorial to the Stratford Martyrs was added to the churchyard in 1879. In World War II, the church crypt served as an air raid shelter for local people, despite bomb damage to the building itself. In 1961 St John's took over the parish of the deconsecrated Christ Church, Stratford. A new extension was added in 1998.

Between 1988 and 1994, the church was the "home" of the influential post-rock group Bark Psychosis, who rehearsed in the crypt. This would also serve as a recording space for the band, where they first recorded the single Scum (1992), followed by their debut album Hex (1994).
