= St Saviour's Church, Forest Gate =

Church in Forest Gate, London

Coordinates: 51°33′6.909″N 0°1′15.528″E

St Saviour's Church is a Church of England church in Forest Gate, east London. It was opened by Emmanuel Church, Forest Gate as a mission hall in 1880, with a separate parish (split off from that of Emmanuel) and a permanent church following three years later. Its first vicar was Henderson Burnside, one of the first Anglican missionaries in Japan. It opened a mission at "365 Railway Arches" in 1903. Its parish is now known as 'St Saviour's and St James's, Forest Gate' after the area formerly forming the parish of St James' Church, Forest Gate was transferred to it in 2014 - the congregation from St James', however, transferred to St Paul's Church, Stratford, also in 2014.
