= St Paul's Church, Stratford =

Church in Stratford, London, England

Coordinates: 51°32′50.937″N 0°0′3.147″E

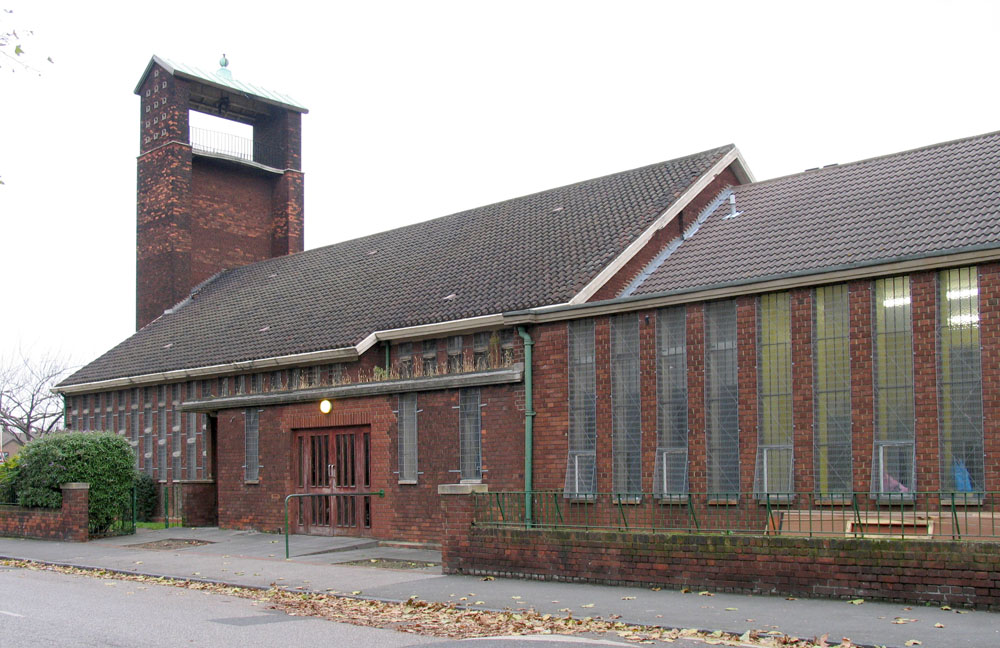
St Paul's Church

St Paul's Church, Stratford is a Church of England church in Stratford, London. It had its origins in a Sunday School opened in Stratford New Town by a City Missionary around 1850, for which a building was constructed on Queen Street by Samuel Gurney in 1853, within the parish of St John's Church, Stratford. St John's vicar William Holloway was ambivalent about the mission and so friction arose when the vicar of All Saints, A J Ram, bought a site for the mission to build a church, initially an iron hall in 1859 and a permanent church in 1864, both dedicated to St Paul. The latter was built with assistance from Thomas Fowell Buxton and Raymond Pelly. The permanent church was then assigned a separate parish in 1865, split from that of St John's. The church was destroyed by a V-weapon in 1945, but was replaced by a new building, consecrated in 1953.

St Paul's parish opened a mission church of St Mark to provide services for factory girls, opening in 1877, building a permanent building in 1891, suffering bomb damage and finally being sold to the Methodist Church after 1945. Its parish is now known as 'St Paul and St James, Stratford', after the congregation of St James' Church, Forest Gate moved from St John's to St Paul's in 2014 (the former parish area of St James' instead moved to St Saviour's, also in 2014.
