= St Edmund's Church, Forest Gate =

Church in Forest Gate, London

Coordinates: 51°32′39.954″N 0°2′13.049″E

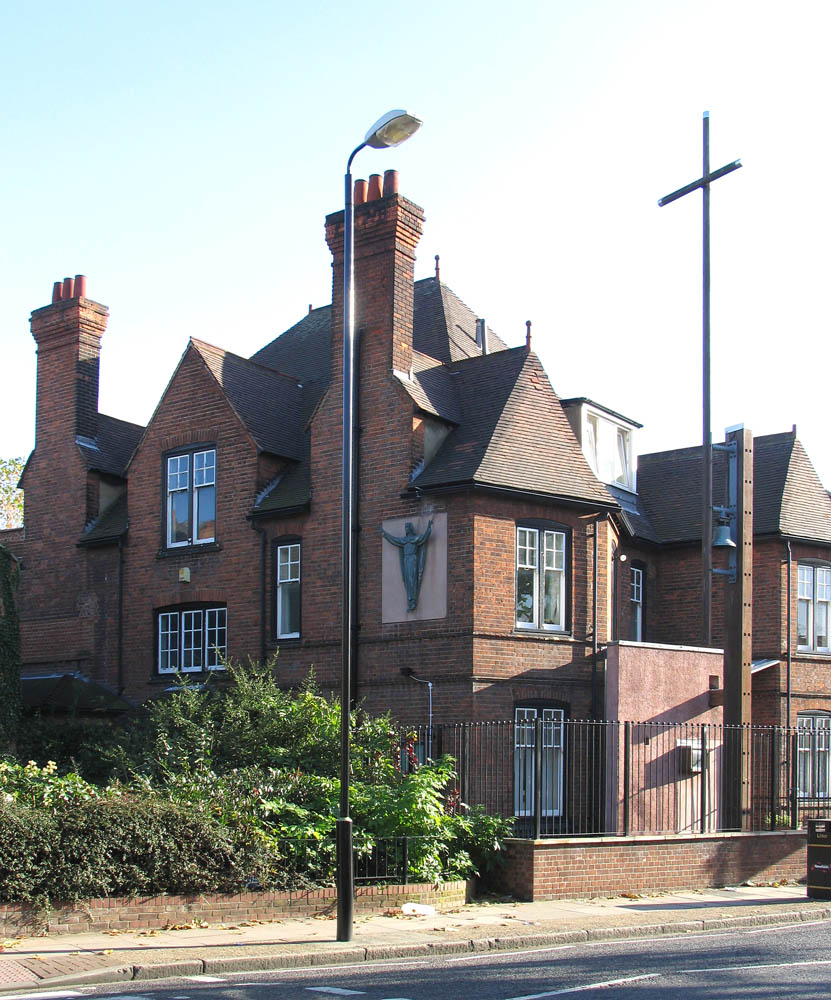
St Edmunds, Katherine Road, London E7 - geograph.org.uk - 1742221.jpg

St Edmund's Church, Forest Gate or the Church of St Edmund, King and Martyr, Forest Gate is an Anglo-Catholic church in the Forest Gate area of Newham, east London. It is dedicated to Edmund the Martyr. It originated in 1895 as the Red Post Lane mission district of All Saints parish. It became a parish of its own in 1901, with a permanent church completed in 1932. It now forms part of the East Ham Team Parish (also known as the Parish of the Holy Trinity) alongside St Mary Magdalene's Church, St Bartholomew's Church and St Alban's Church.
