= St Mark's Church, Forest Gate =

St Mark's Church
- St Mark's Church
- 51°33′10.295″N 0°1′58.15″E
- OS grid reference: TQ 41032 85732
- Location: Lorne Road, Forest Gate, Greater London, E7 0LJ
- Country: England
- Denomination: Church of England
- Churchmanship: Evangelical

History
- Status: Active

Architecture
- Functional status: Parish church
- Years built: 1893–1898

Administration
- Diocese: Diocese of Chelmsford
- Archdeaconry: Archdeaconry of West Ham
- Deanery: Newham
- Parish: St. Mark, Forest Gate

Clergy
- Vicar: The Revd Ben King

St Mark's Church is a Church of England parish church in Forest Gate, east London.

== History ==
It is sited on Lorne Road and originated as a mission church of Emmanuel Church. It was meant to serve the area between Wanstead Flats and the Romford Road and initially held services in a rented cowshed, until a site was acquired in 1888 for a permanent church, built in three stages between 1893 and 1898. This church was given a separate parish in 1894 by splitting off areas from Emmanuel and All Saints.

=== Present day ===
St Mark's stands in the evangelical tradition of the Church of England.
