= St Mary Magdalene's Church, East Ham =

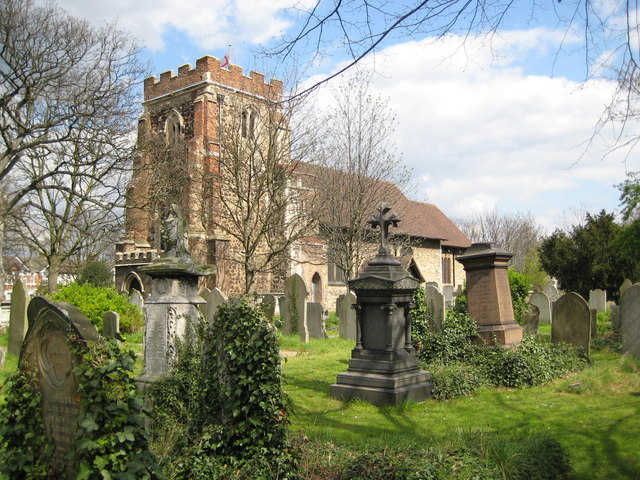
- St Mary Magdalene's; Church, East Ham
- 51°31′20.0964″N 0°3′31.6188″E
- OS grid reference: TQ 42929 82378
- Country: England
- Denomination: Church of England
- Website: easthamparish.org.uk

History
- Founded: 12th century

Administration
- Parish: East Ham

St Mary Magdalene's Church, East Ham is a parish church in East Ham, east London, dedicated to St Mary Magdalene. Its nave, chancel and apse date to the first half of the 12th century and the tower probably to the early 13th century but partly rebuilt in the 16th century - it is claimed to be the oldest parish church still in weekly use in Greater London and is listed at Grade I.

A recess containing a piscina was cut into the nave's south wall beside the chancel for a nave altar in the 13th century, faint traces of wall paintings from that century also survive on the apse. The roofs were altered in the early 17th century and in 1639 Sir Richard Heigham gave the present white marble font. A 17th century memorial to an Edmond Nevill also survived - he is said to have lived locally at Green Street House and he laid claim to the attainted title of Earl of Westmoreland - and to his daughter, Lady Katherine Nevill. Other monuments to Giles Breame and William Heigham survive, whilst William Stukeley is said to have selected the church's churchyard in his lifetime - he is buried there without a monument.

Though box pews and a triple decker pulpit were added (only to be replaced in the 1890s), the 18th century otherwise saw few alterations. A west gallery for children was added in 1820 and the south porch converted into a vestry ten years later, replaced by a yellow-brick west porch opening into the tower. In 1883 it opened the mission church that became St Michael and All Angels Church, Beckton Road. In 1896 the west gallery was removed and further restorations completed. In 1908 the south porch stopped being a vestry after a new level was created in the tower for a vestry. A complete restoration in 1931 removed the apse and chancel ceilings, opened out the rood-loft stair and stripped the external plaster from the tower.

The London Blitz destroyed the chancel roof and the whole church's stained glass in 1941, along with other damage, but repairs were immediate and a permanent restoration of the nave was complete by the war's end, followed by a more comprehensive restorations in 1950 and 1965–1966. It now forms part of the East Ham Team Parish (also known as the Parish of the Holy Trinity) alongside St Edmund's, St Bartholomew's and St Alban's.
