= East Ham =

Suburban district of London, England

Coordinates: 51.5323°N 0.0554°E

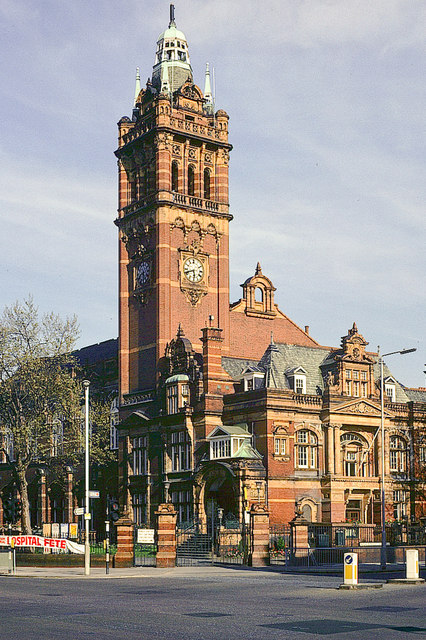
- East Ham Town Hall, on the Barking Road

- Location within Greater London
- Population: 76,186 (2011 Census)
- OS grid reference: TQ425835
  - Charing Cross: 8 mi (12.9 km) W
- London borough: Newham
- Ceremonial county: Greater London
- Region: London
- Country: England
- Sovereign state: United Kingdom
- Post town: LONDON
- Postcode district: E6
- Dialling code: 020
- Police: Metropolitan
- Fire: London
- Ambulance: London
- UK Parliament: East Ham
- London Assembly: City and East

East Ham is a district of the London Borough of Newham, England, 8 miles (12.8 km) east of Charing Cross. Within the boundaries of the historic county of Essex, East Ham is identified in the London Plan as a Major Centre. The population is 76,186.

== History ==
=== Toponymy ===
The first known written use of the term, as 'Hamme', is in an Anglo-Saxon charter of 958, in which King Edgar granted the Manor of Ham, which was undivided at that time, to Ealdorman Athelstan. A subsequent charter on 1037 describes a transfer of land, which has been identified with East Ham, indicating that the first division of the territory occurred between 958 and 1037.

The place name derives from Old English 'hamm' and means 'a dry area of land between rivers or marshland', referring to the location of the settlement within boundaries formed by the rivers Lea, Thames and Roding and their marshes. North Woolwich seems likely to have been removed from Ham in the aftermath of the Norman Conquest.

The earliest recorded use of the name East Ham, as distinct from Ham or West Ham, is in 1204 as EstHam. The names East and West Ham were applied to ancient parishes in place by the end of the 12th century.

=== Administration and representation ===
East Ham was originally part of the hundred of Becontree, part of the historic county of Essex. East Ham Local Government District was created in 1878, when the ancient parish of East Ham adopted the Local Government Act 1858 and formed a local board of nine members to govern the area. In 1886 the local government district was extended to include the civil parish of Little Ilford (also known as Manor Park), and the board was increased to 12 in number. The Local Government Act 1894 reconstituted the area as East Ham Urban District, with an elected urban district council of 15 members replacing the board. In 1900, Little Ilford civil parish was abolished and its area absorbed into an enlarged East Ham civil parish.

The East Ham Urban District of Essex was incorporated as a Municipal Borough on 10 August 1903. As a result of popular pressure, East Ham sought and obtained county borough status on 1 April 1915. In 1965, under the London Government Act 1963, it was abolished and merged with the County Borough of West Ham to form the London Borough of Newham.

The principal offices of Newham Council were at the junction of Barking Road and High Street South in the former East Ham Town Hall, a Grade II listed Edwardian structure designed by A. H. Campbell, H. Cheers and J. Smith, which included a landmark clock tower. Built between 1901 and 1903, Passmore Edwards opened the Town Hall on 5 February 1903. Most council departments moved to Newham Dockside (Building 1000, Dockside Road E16) in 2010.

East Ham is also the name of a parliamentary House of Commons constituency East Ham, which covers East Ham and neighbouring areas. The current Member of Parliament (MP) is Stephen Timms.

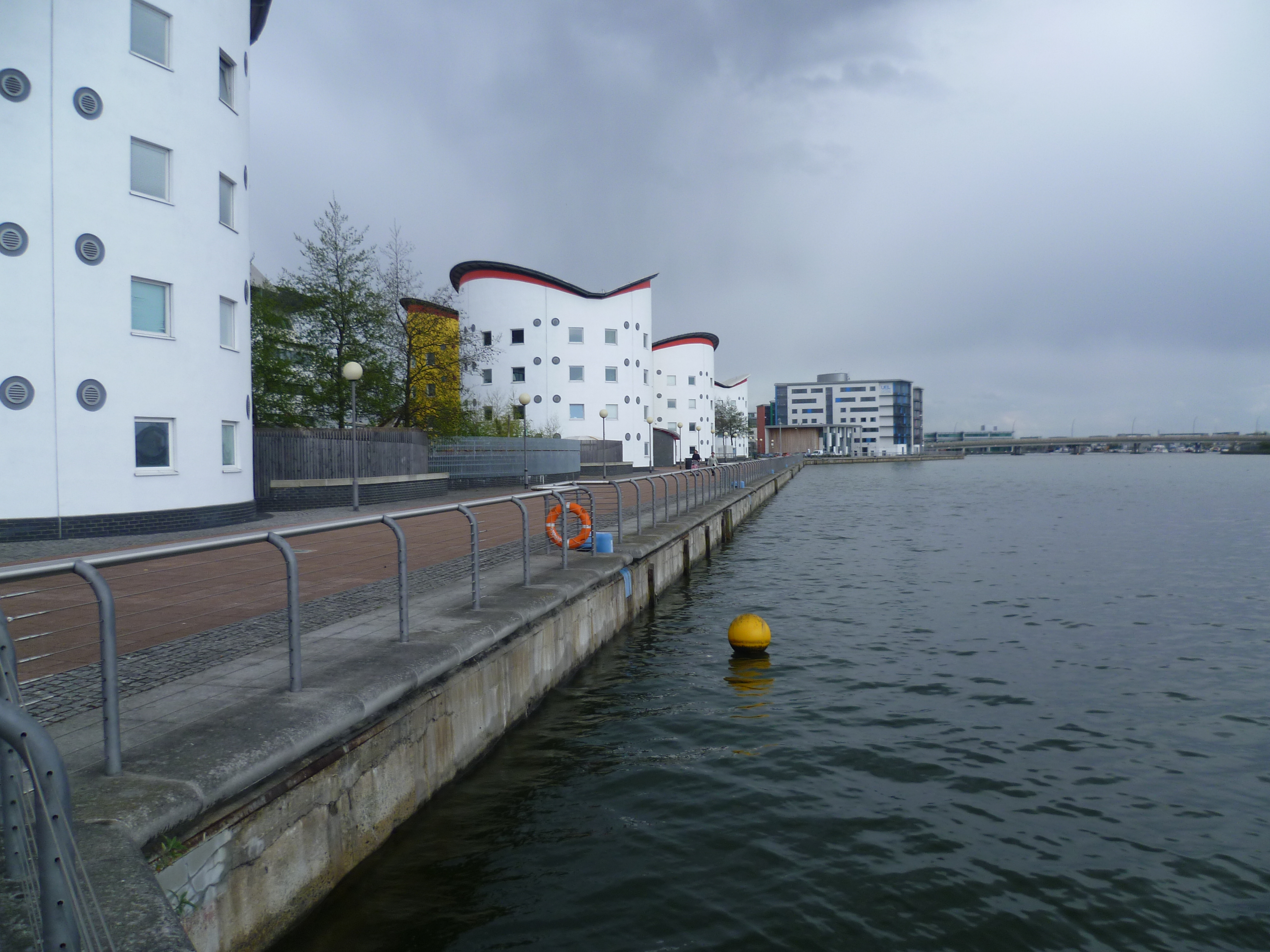
University of East London student accommodation beside the Royal Albert Dock

=== Early history ===
Boleyn Castle on Green Street was built in the 16th century and survived until the 1950s.

=== Economic development ===
In 1859 East Ham railway station opened and, although in 1863 the area was still being described as a scattered village, the availability of transport resulted in increasing urbanisation, especially from 1890 onwards. The electric services of the District Railway first served East Ham in 1908.

=== WWI – East Ham Pals ===
In 1915, the Mayor and Borough of East Ham raised a Pals battalion of local men. The unit became the 32nd (East Ham) battalion of the Royal Fusiliers (City of London Regiment). The battalion was assigned to the 124th Brigade, part of the 41st Division and served on the Western and Italian fronts. A full strength infantry battalion of the timed totalled around 1,036 men, and the East Ham Pals are recorded as losing 444 by the time the battalion was disbanded in March 1918. The disbandment occurred as the British Army was so short of manpower that it could no longer maintain as many units, the surviving members of the East Ham battalion were re-assigned to other units to bring them up to strength.

== Governance ==
East Ham is part of the East Ham constituency for elections to the House of Commons of the United Kingdom.

East Ham is part of the East Ham and East Ham South wards for elections to Newham London Borough Council.

== Geography ==
Housing in East Ham consists principally of Victorian and Edwardian terraced town houses, often in tree-lined avenues.

There are many green spaces in the otherwise bustling and urbanised area of East Ham. The graveyard of the Norman St Mary's church, is maintained as a nature reserve, the largest of its kind in Greater London. Central Park (Central Park Road) and Plashet Park (Plashet Grove) are the two largest parks in East Ham, and both combine open space with playgrounds and cafés. There are also smaller play areas and parks, including Priory Park (Grangewood Street) and Flanders Field, where England football captain Bobby Moore played as a child during the late 1940s and early 1950s. Flanders Fields is currently the home ground of Flanders FC and other is used by Bonny Downs Community Association (BDCA) and other community groups.

Much of the area is part of the E6 postal district, though post codes are not intended to define districts.

=== Demography ===
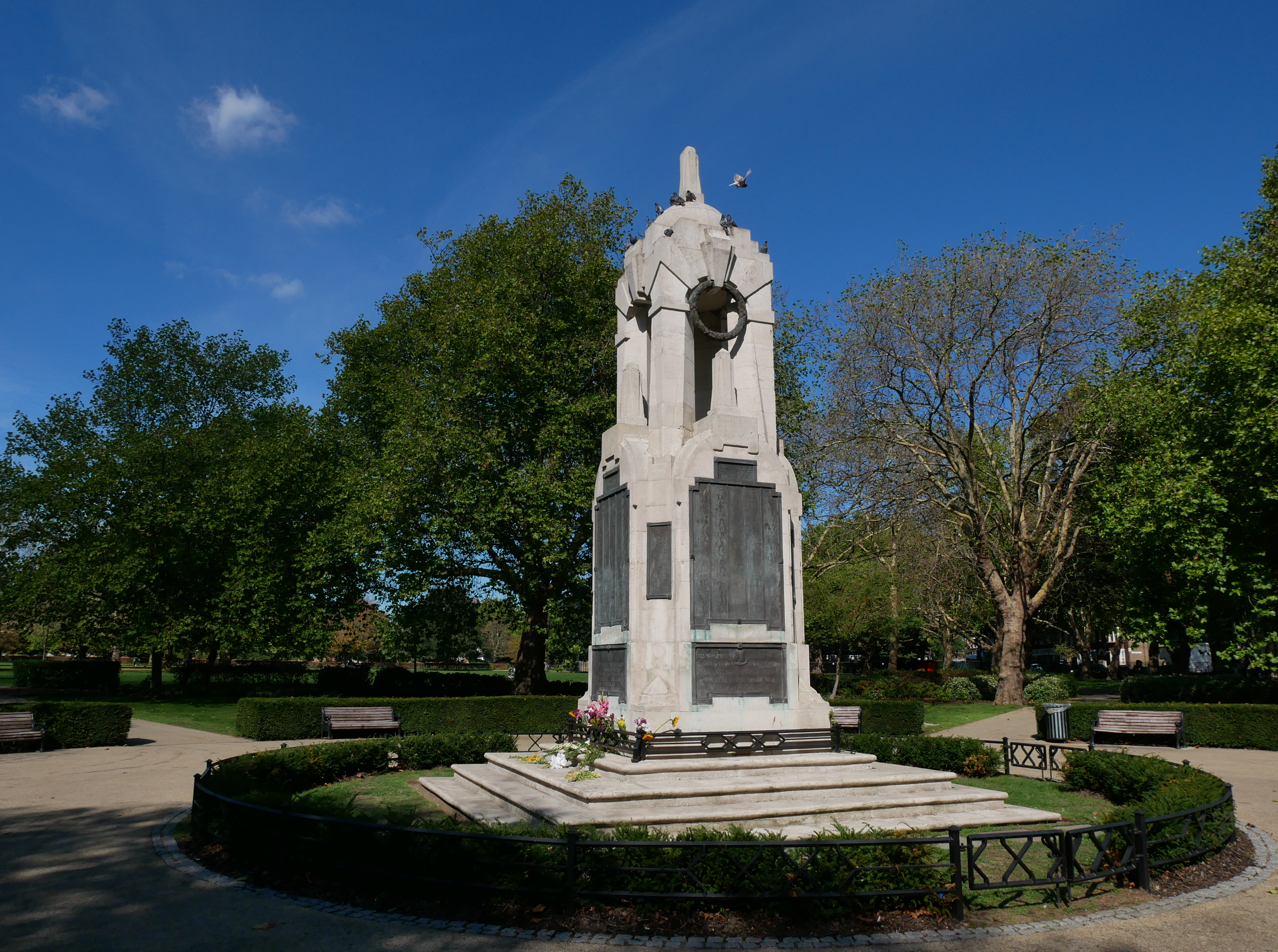
The war memorial in East Ham, now a Grade II listed structure

East Ham is a multicultural area, with many Caribbean, South Asian, African and eastern European residents. As of 2010, East Ham has the fourth-highest level of unemployment in the UK, with 16.5% of all residents registered unemployed. Around 7 in 10 children living in East Ham are from low income families, making it one of the worst areas in the country for child poverty.

In the 2011 UK Census, 90.8% of East Ham North ward was of BAME (Black, Asian and minority ethnic) background, and 89.9% of Green Street East was BAME. These are the 3rd and 4th highest figures in all of Greater London, only behind Southall Broadway and Southall Green. The figure for East Ham Central was 81.9%.

The Wall End ward (eastern parts of East Ham) had a crime rate of 46.6% in 2014-15, far below the average for both Newham and Greater London.

=== Religion ===
There are numerous places of worship for many different religions, ranging from St. Michael's Church to Kensington Avenue Temple. The Parish Church of St Mary Magdalene dates to the first half of the 12th century and is claimed to be the oldest parish church still in use in Greater London. It contains a memorial to an Edmond Nevill, who laid claim to the attainted title of Earl of Westmoreland in the 17th century. There are two Hindu temples in the area; one dedicated to Mahalakshmi and the other to Murugan. The latter temple was recently rebuilt with a larger prayer hall and traditional temple tower as is typical of Tamil temples in South Asia. Due to a very large Muslim community, East Ham also has many mosques. Some of the mosques include Islamic Dawah Centre, Masjid Tauheed, Jamia Mosque, Masjid Bilal and Madina Masjid.

=== Transport ===
Transport connections are provided at East Ham Underground station. East Ham station is served by the District and Hammersmith & City lines. To the north of East Ham is Manor Park and Little Ilford, to the east over the North Circular Road is Barking, to the west is Upton Park and to the south over the A13 is Beckton.

== Sport ==
Prior to West Ham United's relocation to the London Stadium in 2016, they were based at the Boleyn Ground, just inside East Ham's Green Street border with West Ham. East Ham United merged into Barking & East Ham United in 2001, with the merged club dissolved in 2006.

== Local community ==
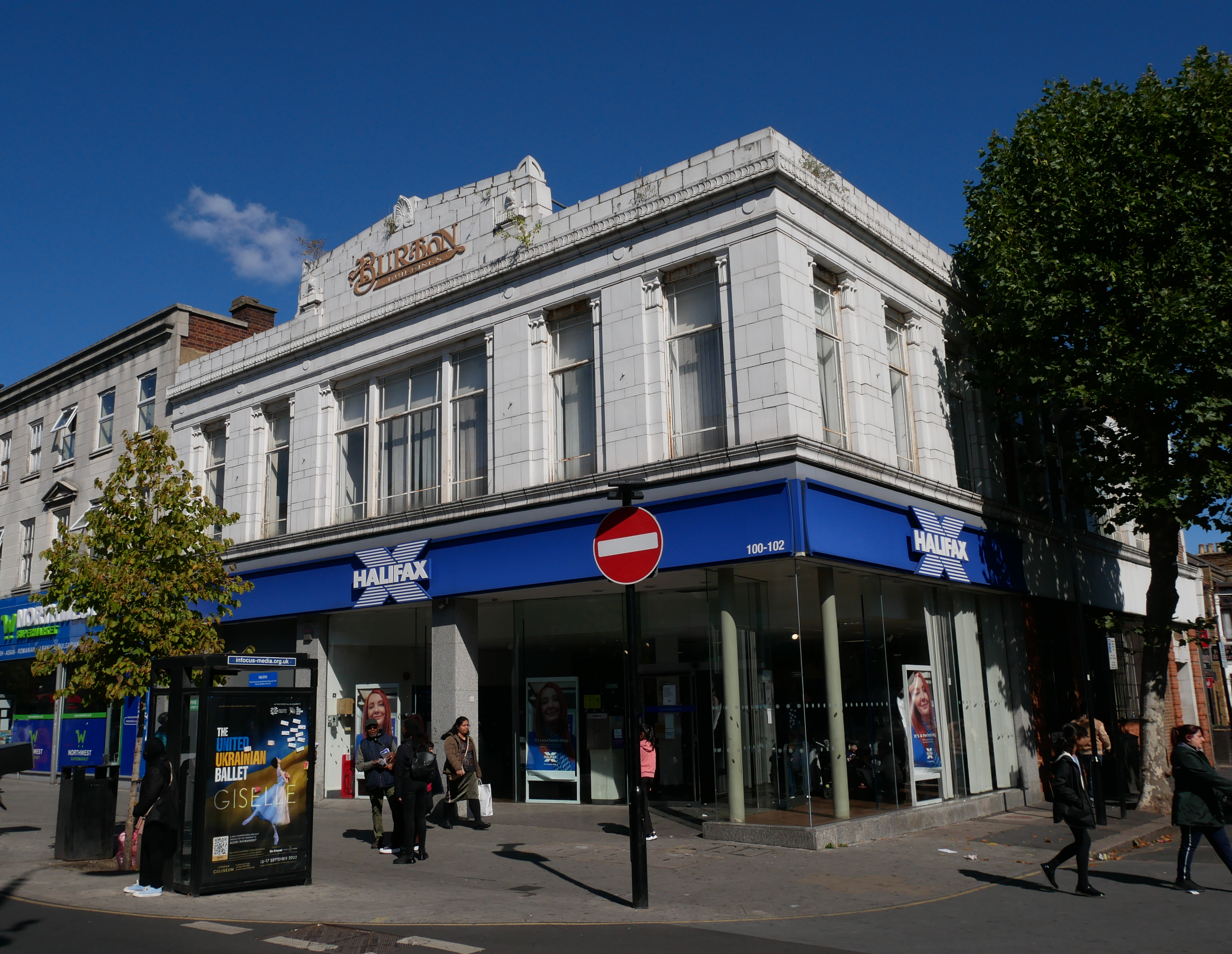
The purpose-built Burton store in the High Street at East Ham

=== ParkLives ===
Newham Council run a number of subsidised or free support programs for locals such as the ParkLives scheme. Run by Coca-Cola in association with Active Newham, free activities are hosted in Newham's parks, including yoga, tennis, rounders and other social sports.

=== East Edge Sisters WI ===
East Ham has its own Women's Institute group, formed in 2016. The group meets every second Tuesday of the month. A modern WI, they host activities and talks as well as running a pop up cafe at local events such as; The Newham Show and local art exhibitions.

=== Bike from Boleyn ===
Bike from Boleyn was set up by the Boleyn community in 2016. They host a bi-annual bike ride from Upton Park to West Ham's new stadium in the Olympic Park to promote and preserve the historic, community and economic links between Boleyn and West Ham United as well as the local area and community networks. This also highlights the Greenway, London as an important Newham asset linking the East and West of the borough, and encourages cycling in the borough.

=== The Greatfield Residents Association ===
The Greatfield Residents Association is a local residents association based in East Ham South (This area used to be an electoral ward known as 'Greatfields', which is where the name is from). Their objective is to promote the local area and create 'a sense of togetherness'. The group meets regularly and publishes a biannual newsletter, as well as being involved in local events and working with the council to encourage improvements to the area. In 2016 they also set up a quarterly craft and food market, funded by the Evening Standard Dispossessed Fund, to showcase local talent and diversity.

=== Bonny Downs Community Association ===
Bonny Downs Community Association (BDCA) is an East Ham charity founded in 1998. BDCA runs two community hubs in East Ham – The Well Community Centre and Flanders Playing Field, where Bobby Moore was discovered by West Ham United Scouts. BDCA provides a range of activities for older people, youth, children and families.

=== Local newspapers ===
The Newham Recorder is a local printed and online newspaper.

=== Local blogs ===
There are some local area blogs, run by enthusiastic residents, including EastBlam (a local events blog and review site) which was featured in the Evening Standard as a 'blog to watch'.

== Notable people ==
- Jimmy Bullard – Former professional footballer.
- Terrance Dicks – Prolific Doctor Who writer and children's author
- Idris Elba – English actor, musician, voice actor, and DJ.
- Elizabeth Fry – English prison reformer, social reformer and Christian philanthropist who lived at Plashet House.
- Noele Gordon – English actress, presenter and TV executive.
- Bill Kaine – professional footballer.
- Kano – English rapper and actor.
- Dame Vera Lynn – singer, songwriter, and actress whose musical recordings and performances were highly popular during the Second World War.
- Fred Massey – English footballer.
- Kiell Smith-Bynoe – English actor and presenter.

== See also ==
- List of people from Newham
- List of schools in Newham
