= London and Home Counties Traffic Advisory Committee =

The London and Home Counties Traffic Advisory Committee was established in 1924 to advise the Minister of Transport on issues concerning traffic and transport in the London Traffic Area. It was abolished in 1965.

The purpose of the committee, as stated in the London Traffic Act 1924 was "giving advice and assistance in manner provided by this Act to the Minister of Transport... in connection with the exercise and performance of his powers and duties in relation to traffic within the... London Traffic Area...".

== Establishment, 1924 ==
The committee was created, along with the Traffic Area, by the London Traffic Act 1924. The membership was appointed by both national and local government as follows:

- 1 by the Secretary of State for Home Affairs
- 2 by the London County Council
- 1 by the Corporation of the City of London
- 2 (jointly) by the councils of the metropolitan boroughs of the County of London
- 1 (jointly) by the county councils of Buckinghamshire, Essex, Hertfordshire, Middlesex
- 1 (jointly) by the county councils of Kent and Surrey
- 1 (jointly) by the corporations of the county boroughs of Croydon, East Ham, West Ham
- 1 representative of the Metropolitan Police, appointed by the Secretary of State for Home Affairs
- 1 representative of the City of London Police appointed by the City Corporation
- 1 appointed by the Minister of Transport

The members of the committee were to appoint a chairman themselves.

== Reconstitution, 1933 ==
The committee was reconstituted by the London Passenger Transport Act 1933, and membership increased to forty members:

- 1 by the Secretary of State for Home Affairs
- 1 by the Minister for Transport
- 6 by the London County Council:
- 1 by the Corporation of the City of London
- 1 by the Council of the City of Westminster
- 6 by the councils of the remaining metropolitan boroughs
- 2 by the Middlesex County Council
- 2 by the Essex County Council
- 1 by the Kent County Council
- 1 by the Surrey County Council
- 1 (jointly) by the Buckinghamshire and Hertfordshire County Councils
- 1 by the Council of the County Borough of Croydon
- 1 by the Council of the County Borough of East Ham
- 1 by the Council of the County Borough of West Ham
- 1 the Secretary of State for Home Affairs to represent the Metropolitan Police
- 1 the Secretary of State for Home Affairs to represent county and borough police forces in the London Traffic Area
- 1 by the Corporation of the City of London to represent the City Police
- 2 by the London Passenger Transport Board
- 2 by the amalgamated railway companies
- 5 by the Minister of Labour "after consultation with such bodies representative of those interests as he may think fit to represent the interests of labour engaged in the transport industry within the London Traffic Area"
- 1 by the Minister for Transport, "after consultation with such bodies representative of those interests as he may think fit, to represent the interests of persons (other than the Board and the amalgamated railway companies) providing or using mechanically-propelled road vehicles within the London Traffic Area"
- 1 the Minister for Transport, "after consultation with such bodies representative of those interests as he may think fit, to represent the interests of persons (other than the Board and the amalgamated railway companies) providing or using horse-drawn road vehicles within the London Traffic Area"
- 1 the Minister for Transport, "after consultation with such bodies representative of those interests as he may think fit, to represent the interests of the taxi-cab industry within the London Traffic Area"

== Reconstitution, 1960 ==
The committee was reconstituted a second time by the Road Traffic Act 1960, to better represent the variety of road-users:

- 1 by the Secretary of State for Home Affairs
- 1 by the Minister for Transport
- 6 by the London County Council:
- 1 by the Corporation of the City of London:
- 1 by the Council of the City of Westminster:
- 6 by the councils of the remaining metropolitan boroughs:
- 2 by the Middlesex County Council:
- 1 by Essex County Council:
- 1 by the Kent County Council:
- 1 by the Surrey County Council:
- 1 by the Buckinghamshire and Hertfordshire County Councils:
- 1 by the Council of the County Borough of Croydon:
- 1 by the Council of the County Borough of East Ham:
- 1 by the Council of the County Borough of West Ham:
- 1 by the Secretary of State to represent the metropolitan police:
- 1 by the Secretary of State to represent county and borough police forces in the London Traffic Area:
- 1 by the Corporation of the City of London to represent the City police:
- 4 by the British Transport Commission:
- 5 by the Minister of Labour, after consultation with such bodies representative of those interests as he may think fit, to represent the interests of labour engaged in the transport industry within the London Traffic Area:
- 2 by the Minister, after consultation with such bodies representative of those interests as he may think fit, to represent the interests of persons (other than such persons as are hereinafter mentioned and other than the British Transport Commission and any Executive) providing or using mechanically propelled road vehicles within the London Traffic Area.
- 1 by the Minister, after consultation with such bodies representative of those interests as he may think fit, to represent the interests of persons (other than the British Transport Commission and any Executive) who are holders of A or B licences (within the meaning of Part IV of this Act) carrying on business within the London Traffic Area:†
- 1 by the Minister, after consultation with such bodies representative of those interests as he may think fit, to represent the interests of persons who are holders of C licences (within the meaning of Part IV of this Act) carrying on business within the London Traffic Area:†
- 1 by the Minister, after consultation with such bodies representative of those interests as he may think fit, to represent the interests of persons (other than the British Transport Commission and any Executive) who are the holders of licences authorising them to operate public service vehicles within the London Traffic Area:
- 1 by the Minister, after consultation with such bodies representative of those interests as he may think fit, to represent the interests of persons (other than the British Transport Commission and any Executive) providing or using horse-drawn road vehicles within the London Traffic Area.
- 1 by the Minister, after consultation with such bodies representative of those interests as he may think fit, to represent the interests of the taxi-cab industry within the London Traffic Area.
- 1 by the Minister, after consultation with such bodies representative of those interests as he may think fit, to represent the interests of persons using bicycles and tricycles, not being motor vehicles, within the London Traffic Area.

† An A Licence entitled the holder to drive a motorcycle; a B Licence a motor car; and a C licence a heavy goods vehicle.

The Committee and Traffic Area were abolished in 1965 by the London Government Act 1963.
