= Barking Town Urban District Council Light Railways =

Tramway operator in England

Operation
- Locale: Barking
- Open: 1 December 1903
- Close: 16 February 1929
- Status: Closed

Infrastructure
- Track gauge: 1,435 mm (4 ft 8 1/2 in)
- Propulsion system: Electric

Statistics
- Route length: 2.83 miles (4.55 km)

Barking Town Urban District Council Light Railways operated a passenger tramway service in Barking between 1903 and 1929.

== History ==
Barking Town Urban District Council opened services on this tramway on 1 December 1903. With a total of 2.8 route miles, this was one of the shortest tramway operations in Britain.

The depot was located at TQ 4439 8198

== Fleet ==
- 1-3 Brush Electrical Engineering Company 1903
- 4-5 Brush Electrical Engineering Company 1903 (withdrawn in 1926)
- 6-7 Brush Electrical Engineering Company 1903
- 8 Brush Electrical Engineering Company 1911 (sold to Ilford Urban District Council Tramways in 1915)
- 9 Brush Electrical Engineering Company 1911 (sold to East Ham Corporation Tramways in 1915)
- 10 Brush Electrical Engineering Company 1912 (sold to Ilford Urban District Council Tramways in 1914)

== Closure ==
On 16 February 1929 the last services were replaced by buses.
