= Newham Town Hall =

Municipal building in London, England

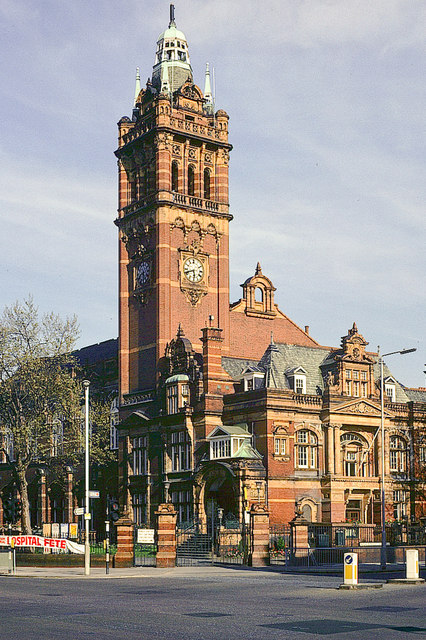
- Newham Town Hall

- Shown in Newham
- 51.5326°N 0.0554°E
- Location: Barking Road, East Ham

History
- Built: 1903; 123 years ago

Site notes
- Architect(s): Henry Cheers and Joseph Smith
- Architectural style: Renaissance style

Listed Building – Grade II*
- Designated: 31 January 1973; 53 years ago
- Reference no.: 1190712

Newham Town Hall, formerly East Ham Town Hall, is a municipal building in Barking Road, East Ham, London. The town hall, which is the headquarters of Newham London Borough Council, is a Grade II* listed building.

== History ==
In the early 20th century the East Ham Urban District Council held its meetings in the local school board offices in Wakefield Street. Following a rapid growth in the local population, civic leaders decided to procure purpose-built council offices: the site chosen for the new building was a plot of open land on the corner of Barking Road and High Street South.

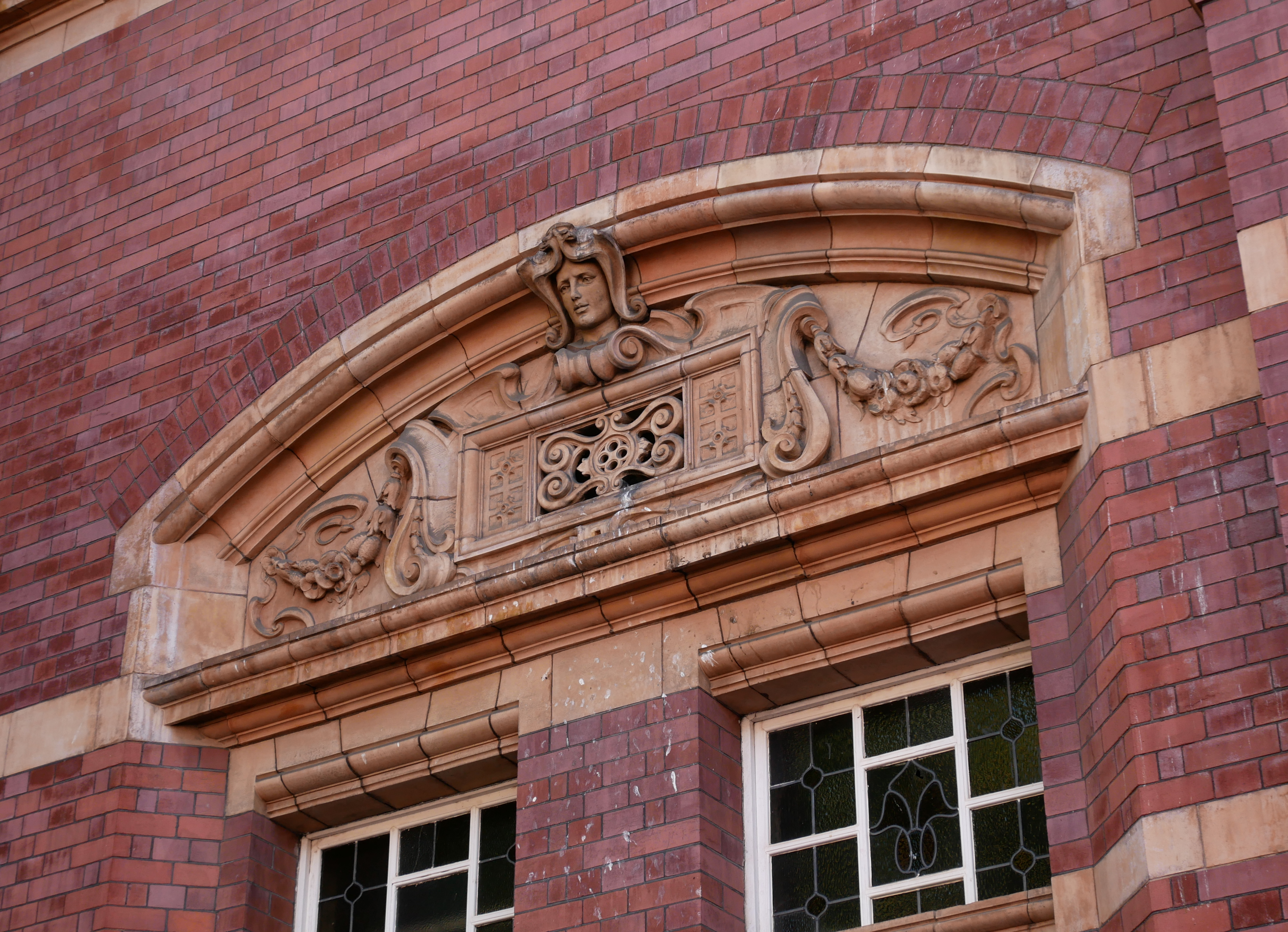
Detail on the north face of the town hall

The foundation stone for the new building was laid in 1901. It was designed by Henry Cheers and Joseph Smith in the Renaissance style, built by D.W. Barker and was officially opened by the philanthropist, John Passmore Edwards, on 5 February 1903. The design involved an asymmetrical main frontage with six bays facing onto Barking Road; the right hand section featured a 150 foot (46 m) high tower and a large archway to the extreme right inscribed with the words "Public Hall" above. The tower contained a clock by Smith & Sons of Derby, and an hour bell cast by John Taylor & Co of Loughborough, which weighed almost a ton (19cwt). A long extension to the south of the main building was completed in 1910 and a three-storey annex was built to the east on Barking Road in 1939. Internally, the principal rooms were the public hall, the council chamber and the mayor's parlour.

It was built to serve as the administrative headquarters of East Ham Urban District Council. The East Ham Urban District was given municipal borough status in 1904; and county borough status in 1915. The building continues to be the local seat of government after the formation of the London Borough of Newham in 1965, serving as its administrative headquarters.

An additional building in Stratford, which was designed by the borough architect, Ken Lund, and Norman White in the shape of a ziggurat, was completed in May 1976; it was to have been joined by another, larger ziggurat, but after reductions in funding and criticism of the design the original ziggurat was demolished in February 1998.

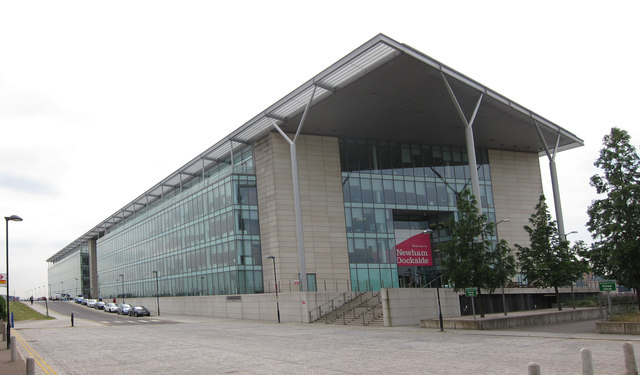
Offices at Newham Dockside

Most council officers and their departments were re-located to Newham Dockside (Building 1000 in Dockside Road) in 2010. The building had been designed by Aukett Swanke and developed by Development Securities, Standard Life Investments and the London Development Agency as part of a scheme to regenerate the Royal Albert Dock; it had been built by Bowmer + Kirkland at a cost of £70 million and had been completed in June 2004. After the developers had been unable to secure tenants, Newham Council acquired the building for £92 million and initiated a programme of fit-out works at a further cost of £19 million. However, formal meetings of the council continue to take place in the town hall.
