= County Borough of West Ham =

Historical local government district in the extreme south west of Essex

Coordinates: 51.5406°N 0.0017°E

West Ham
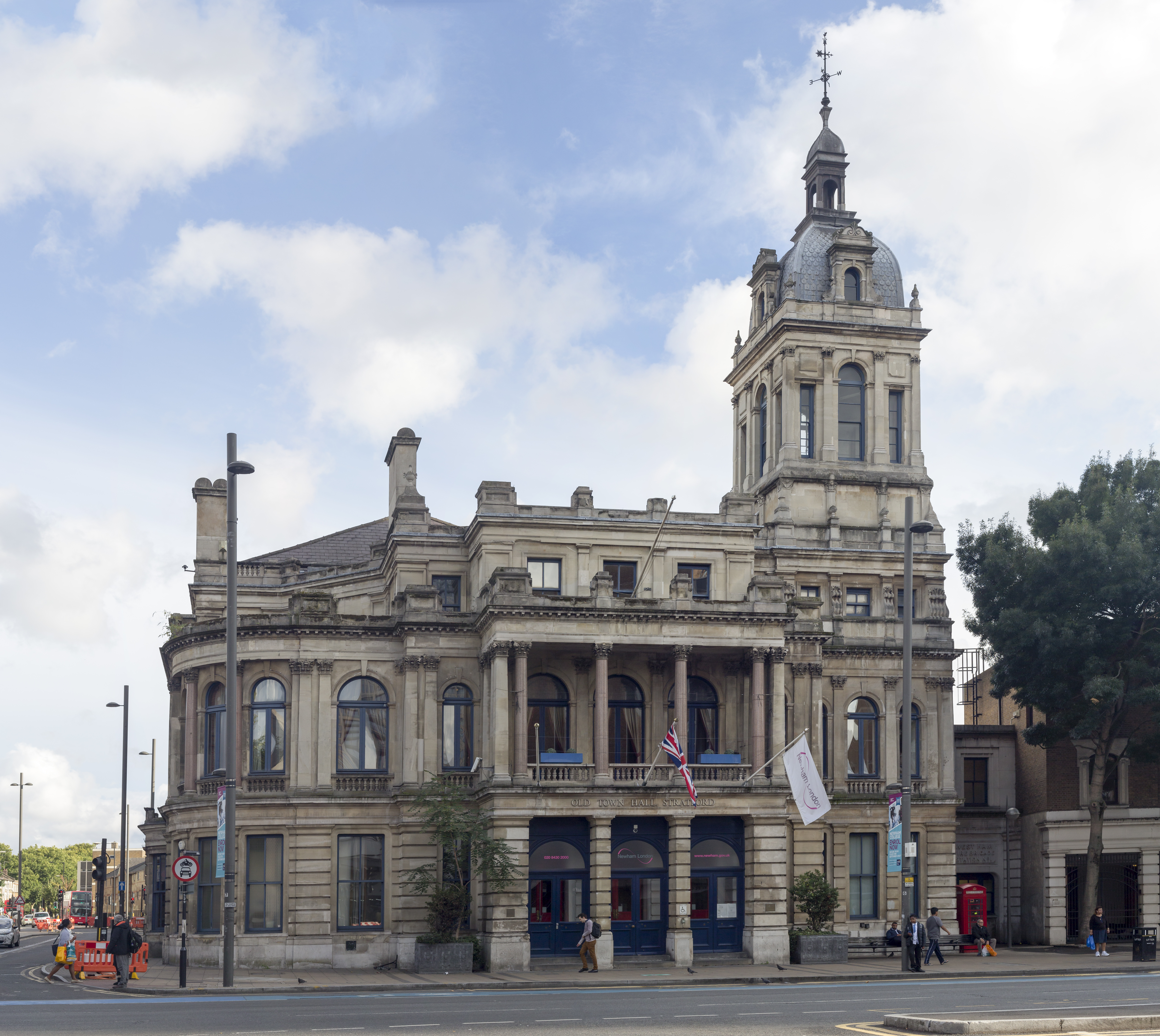
- Stratford Town Hall

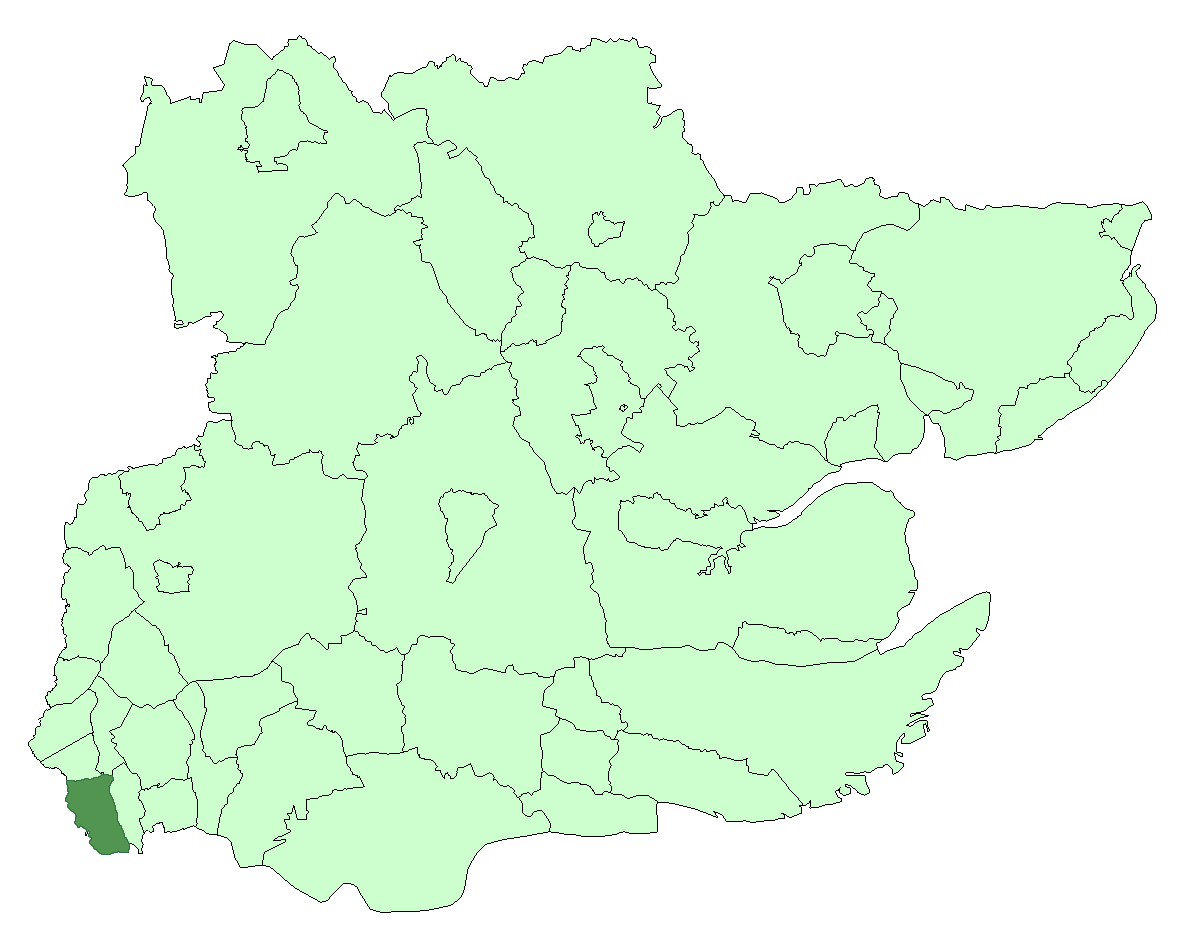
- West Ham within Essex in 1961
- Area
  - 1861: 4,667 acres (18.9 km^{2})
  - 1911: 4,683 acres (19.0 km^{2})
  - 1931/1961: 4,689 acres (19.0 km^{2})
- Population
  - 1861: 38,331
  - 1911: 289,030
  - 1931: 294,278
  - 1961: 157,367
- Density
  - 1861: 8/acre
  - 1911: 62/acre
  - 1931: 63/acre
  - 1961: 34/acre
- History
  - Origin: West Ham ancient parish
  - Created: 1856
  - Abolished: 1965
  - Succeeded by: London Borough of Newham
- Status: Civil parish (until 1965); Local board of health district (1856–1886); Municipal borough (1886–1889); County borough (1889–1965)
- Government: West Ham Local Board (1856–1886); West Ham Borough Council (1886–1965)
  - HQ: Town Hall, Broadway, Stratford (1869–1965)
  - Motto: Deo Confidimus (We trust in God)
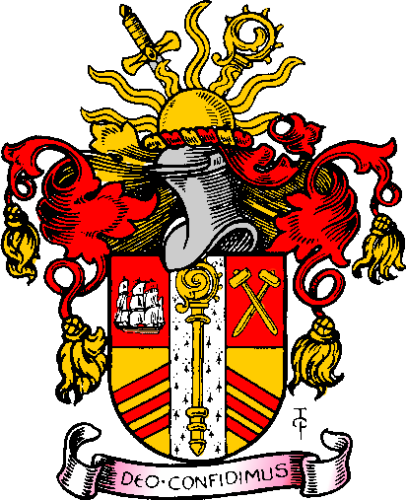
- Arms of the county borough corporation

West Ham was a local government district in the extreme south west of Essex from 1886 to 1965, forming part of the built-up metropolitan area, although outside the County of London. It was immediately north of the River Thames and east of the River Lea.

== Area and boundaries ==
The borough included Plaistow, West Ham, Stratford, Canning Town and Silvertown – all of the current-day London Borough of Newham west of Green Street. At the time of the 1901 census it was the ninth most populous town or district in England with a population of 267,308. The borough was part of the London postal district and the Metropolitan Police District.

From 1934 to 1965 it was surrounded by the County Borough of East Ham to the east, the municipal boroughs of Wanstead and Woodford and Leyton to the north, and the metropolitan boroughs of Poplar and Hackney to the west and Greenwich and Woolwich to the south.

== Predecessors ==
West Ham underwent rapid growth from 1844 following the Metropolitan Building Act. The Act restricted dangerous and noxious industries from operating in the metropolitan area, the eastern boundary of which was the River Lea. Consequently, many of these activities were relocated to the other side of the river and to West Ham, then a parish in Essex centred on All Saints Church, West Ham. As a result, West Ham became one of Victorian Britain's major manufacturing centres for pharmaceuticals, chemicals, and processed foods. This rapid growth earned it the name "London over the border". The growth of the town was summarised by The Times in 1886:

"Factory after factory was erected on the marshy wastes of Stratford and Plaistow, and it only required the construction at Canning Town of the Victoria and Albert Docks to make the once desolate parish of West Ham a manufacturing and commercial centre of the first importance and to bring upon it a teeming and an industrious population."

Many workers lived in slum conditions close to where they worked, leading to periodic outbreaks of contagious diseases and severe poverty. It had become apparent that local government in the parish of West Ham was not adequate to meet the needs of the area which was divided between the parish vestry, highway board and the Havering and Dagenham Commissioners of Sewers. Problems centred on provision of adequate paving, water supply, fire fighting and control of development. In 1853 a group of ratepayers initiated moves to improve local administration. This led to a public enquiry by Charles Dickens' brother Alfred, a medical officer, who published a report in 1855 severely critical of conditions in the slum areas.

Accordingly, the Public Health Act 1848 was applied to the parish, and a local board of health was formed in 1856. The board had 15 members: 12 elected and 3 nominated by the Commissioners of Sewers.

West Ham received representation as a parliamentary borough as part of the Redistribution of Seats Act 1885, with one MP each for the West Ham North and West Ham South divisions.

== Incorporation ==
A map showing the wards of West Ham Civil Parish as they appeared in 1867.

In November 1878 the inhabitants of the parish decided to petition the privy council for a charter, incorporating the town as a municipal borough. This was in reaction to proposals to enlarge the area governed by the Metropolitan Board of Works to include adjoining districts with a population of 50,000 or more: the primary aim of incorporation was to prevent the inclusion of West Ham in an enlarged London municipality. This initial application was unsuccessful. However, encouraged by the 1883 incorporation of Croydon, a second petition was submitted in May 1885. Following an inquiry in October 1885, a scheme for the creation of the borough and dissolution of the board of health was made in June and the charter was granted in July 1886. A corporation consisting of a mayor, 12 aldermen and 36 councillors replaced the board, with the first elections held on 1 November. The first mayor was John Meeson, head of a local lime burning and cement making firm, and a former chairman of West Ham Local Board. The first female mayor was Daisy Parsons in 1937.

== County borough ==
The Local Government Act 1888 created elected county councils to administer services throughout England and Wales. Where a municipal borough had a population of more than 50,000 at the 1881 Census it was created a county borough, with the powers and duties of both a borough and county council.

As West Ham had an 1881 population of 128,953 it duly became a county borough on 1 April 1889. The borough, while independent of Essex County Council for local government, remained part of the county for purposes such as the administration of justice and lieutenancy.

== Utilities ==
The borough acquired the horse-drawn tram services in its area in 1898, electrified them in 1904, and extended the network. There was also through running of the corporation trams and those of the London County Council system. West Ham Corporation Tramways operated 134 tram cars on 16.27 miles (26.2 km) of tracks when they became the responsibility of the London Passenger Transport Board in 1933. The borough ran its own fire brigade which was absorbed into the London Fire Brigade in 1965. The corporation's electricity generation and supply undertaking was nationalised in 1948, when it was transferred to the London Electricity Board.

Following the passing of the Local Government Act 1929 the Council took over responsibility for certain health services, such as the large Whipps Cross Hospital in neighbouring Leyton (now the Whipps Cross University Hospital) which they developed until it passed into the new National Health Service in 1946.

== Borough council ==
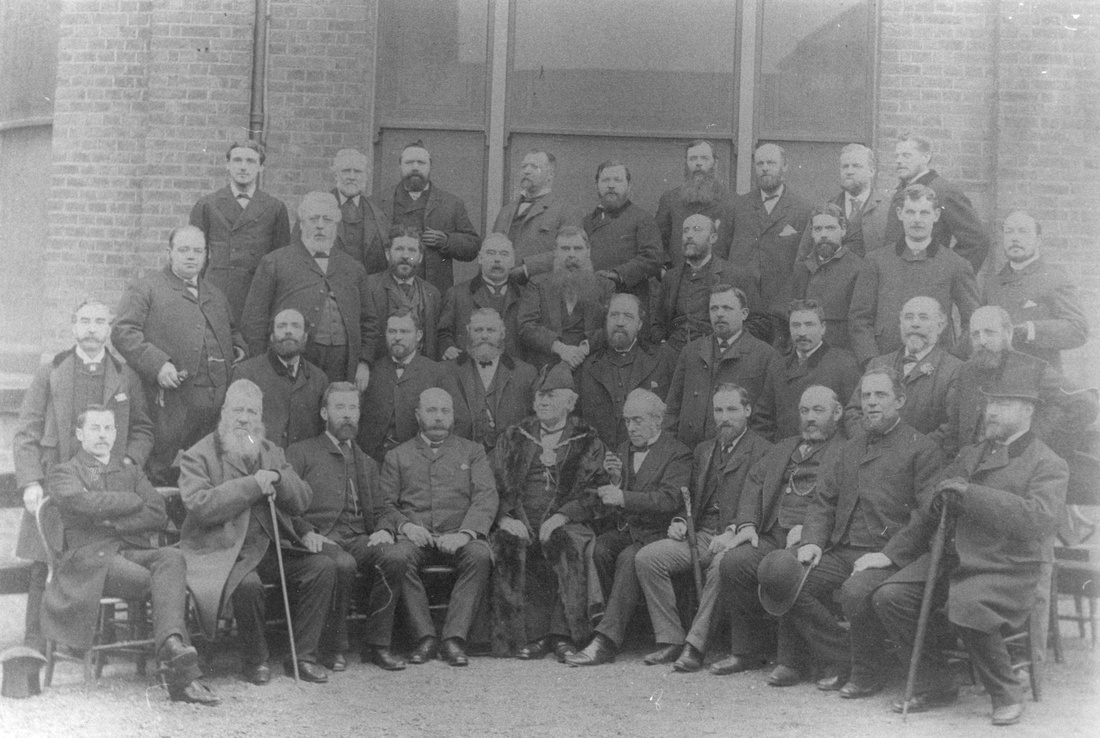
* Top row: Councillors W Crow, T Knight, T Anderson, A Govier, J H Pavitt, W Lewis, C Mansfield, H Wagstaff, J Cook * Second row:Councillors H Young, J Maw(?) E Fulcher, R Fielder, E Jex, S Vinicombe, E E Barnett, J H Bethell, F Hammersley * Third row: Councillors G H Courtney(?) W Hands, G W Kidd, R Wortlet, H Callaghan, R White, WH Medcalf, M Adamson, F Smith * Seated: Aldermen H Pillips, J Scully, W Deason(?) G Hay, J Meeson (Mayor) G Rivett, H Worland, C Stoner, H Barry(?), R L Curtis

=== Wards ===
Under the original charter the borough was divided into four wards: Canning Town, Forest Gate, Plaistow and Stratford. Each ward returned nine councillors, with three councillors elected in each ward for a three-year term on 1 November each year. In addition to the 36 directly elected councillors there were also 12 aldermen, who were elected by the council itself, giving the town council a total membership of 48.

In 1899 the wards were redrawn: the borough was divided into 12 wards, each returning 3 councillors. The number of councillors remained at 36. The 1899 wards were as follows: No.1 or New Town, No.2 or Forest Gate, No.3 or High Street, No.4 or Broadway, No.5 or Park, No.6 or Upton, No.7 or West Ham, No.8 or Plaistow, No.9 or Hudsons, No.10 or Canning Town, No.11 or Tidal Basin and No.12 or Custom House & Silvertown.

In 1922 the number of wards was increased to sixteen, each represented by three councillors and one alderman. The size of the council was thus increased to sixty-four members. The names of the wards, which continued in use until 1965, were: Beckton Road, Bemersyde, Broadway, Canning Town & Grange, Custom House & Silvertown, Forest Gate, High Street, Hudsons, Newtown, Ordnance, Park, Plaistow, Plashet Road, Tidal Basin, Upton and West Ham.

=== Politics ===
The borough was notable for having the first Labour controlled council in England. Following the London Dock Strike of 1889, a number of Socialists and Progressives were elected to the council, formally becoming the Labour Group in 1897. The Group gained a majority on the town council in 1898. In reaction to this, a Municipal Alliance was formed by the West Ham Ratepayers Association and Chamber of Commerce to oppose the Labour Party. In 1900 they gained parity with Labour on the council and in the following year they took control. The Municipal Alliance retained power until 1910 when a Labour-Progressive coalition replaced it. Two years later Municipal Alliance councillors regained a narrow majority, which they held at the 1913 election. Elections were suspended for the duration of the First World War, and at the 1919 elections Labour won an overall majority which it retained for the rest of the borough's existence. The Labour majority was to increase over the years, with a small group of Ratepayers Association councillors supported by the Conservative Party forming the opposition group. From 1947 the Conservatives contested elections in their own name, but after 1954 had no councillors elected. From 1954 to 1960 Labour held all the seats on the council, after which a number of Liberal Party councillors formed a minority group.

=== Coat of arms ===
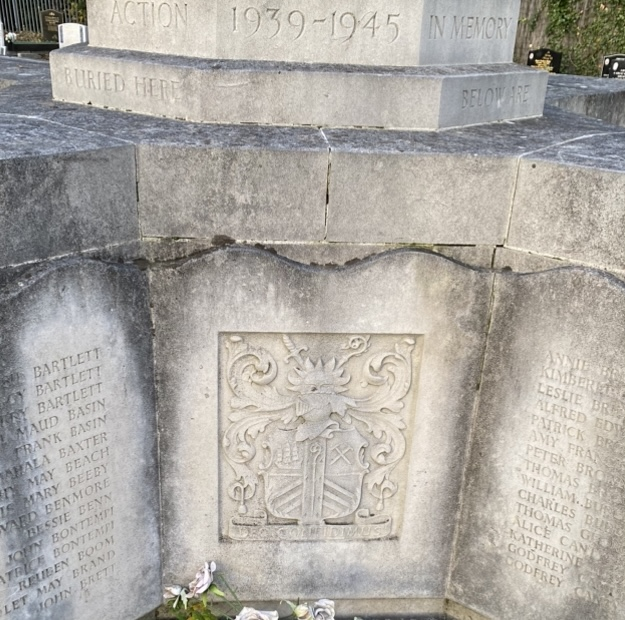
The coat of arms displayed on a war memorial at East London Cemetery

The coat of arms was granted by the College of Arms on 14 January 1887. The chevrons on the lower portion represent Stratford, taken from the device of Stratford Langthorne Abbey. At the top right, there are crossed hammers, representing the Thames Ironworks and Shipbuilding Company – the borough's main employer. The ship is representative of the Royal Docks, and the area's long association with the sea. The Latin motto "Deo Confidimus" at the base translates as "In God We Trust."

== Abolition and inclusion in Greater London ==
The omission of West Ham from the London-administered metropolitan area, which took in nearby places such as Greenwich and Woolwich, was first commented on in 1855 and West Ham Council later considered the case for inclusion in the County of London in 1895 and 1907. The reluctance to proceed with amalgamation was largely explained by lack of perceived support, fear of financial disadvantage caused by increased rates, the detrimental effect of London planning laws on industry, and the desire to retain the independent civic institutions and privileges attached to county borough status.

The Royal Commission on Local Government in Greater London reviewed the local government arrangements of the Greater London Conurbation and in 1965 the county borough, and the County Borough of East Ham, were abolished and their former area was amalgamated with small parts of Barking and Woolwich to form the London Borough of Newham in Greater London.
