= County Borough of East Ham =

Former local government area in the UK

Coordinates: 51.5326°N 0.0552°E

East Ham
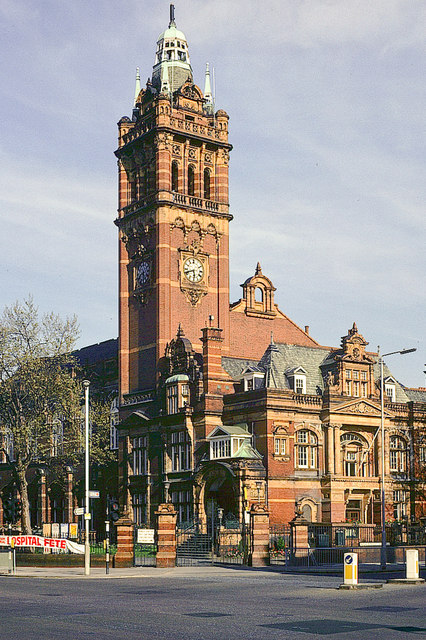
- East Ham Town Hall

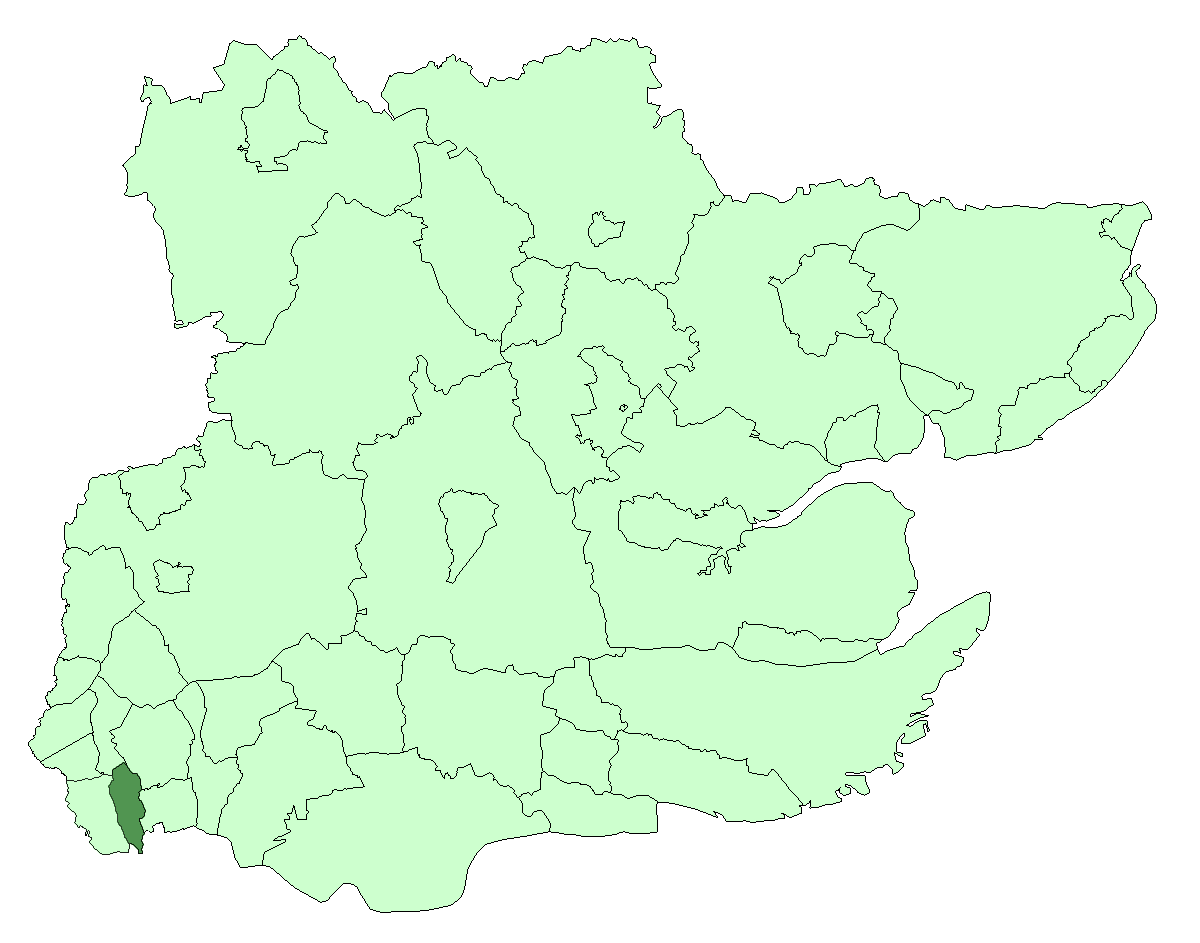
- East Ham within Essex in 1961
- Area
  - 1894: 3,324 acres (13.5 km^{2})
  - 1965: 3,324 acres (13.5 km^{2})
- Population
  - 1901: 96,008
  - 1961: 105,682
- History
  - Created: 1894
  - Abolished: 1965
  - Succeeded by: London Borough of Newham
- Status: Local government district (1878–1894); Urban district (1894–1904); Municipal borough (1904–1915); County borough (1915–1965)
- Government
  - HQ: East Ham
  - Motto: Progressio cum Populo (Progress with the people)
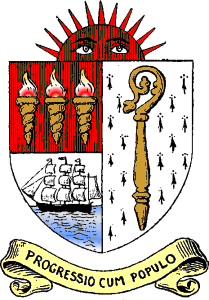
- Subdivisions
  - Type: Parishes
  - Units: East Ham (1878–1965); Little Ilford (1886–1900)

East Ham was a local government district in the far south west of Essex from 1878 to 1965. It extended from Wanstead Flats in the north to the River Thames in the south and from Green Street in the west to Barking Creek in the east. It was part of the London postal district and Metropolitan Police District.

== Local board and urban district ==
East Ham Local Government District was created in 1878, when the parish of East Ham adopted the Local Government Act 1858, and formed a local board of nine members to govern the area. In 1886 the local government district was extended to include the civil parish of Little Ilford, and the board was increased to 12 in number. The Local Government Act 1894 reconstituted the area as an urban district, with an elected urban district council of 15 members replacing the board. In 1900 Little Ilford parish was abolished and its area absorbed into an enlarged East Ham.

== Incorporation ==
On 27 August 1904 East Ham was granted a charter of incorporation constituting the town as a municipal borough. A new town council consisting of a mayor, six aldermen and eighteen councillors replaced the urban district council. The four wards of the urban district were replaced by six new wards (Beckton & North Woolwich, Central East, Central West, Manor Park, Plashet East, Plashet West), each returning three councillors and one aldermen.

== County borough ==
In 1915 the borough gained independence from county administration as a county borough, against the objections of Essex County Council. The size of the borough council was increased to ten alderman and thirty councillors in 1920, representing ten wards: Castle, Central, Greatfield, Kensington, Little Ilford, Manor Park, Plashet, South, Wall End and Woodgrange.

== Boundaries ==
East Ham boundaries in 1961

The borough included most of the current-day London Borough of Newham east of Green Street including Little Ilford, Manor Park, East Ham and Beckton. The borough was part of the London postal district and the Metropolitan Police District. It excluded North Woolwich, as historically this was part of the Metropolitan Borough of Woolwich, in the County of London.

== Services ==
The borough ran its own tram services until they became the responsibility of the London Passenger Transport Board in 1933. The borough ran its own fire brigade which was absorbed into the London Fire Brigade in 1965. East Ham's Town Hall now serves as Newham Town Hall.

== Coat of arms ==
The borough did not have an official coat of arms, but used a device designed by the surveyor to the urban district council in 1896. In a 1916 book on the arms of Essex boroughs the "pseudo-heraldic device" was dismissed as "a somewhat obvious imitation of the arms of West Ham". The official explanation of the device was that the crosier stood for Stratford Langthorne Abbey, established by William de Montfichet in the 12th century; the burning torches stood for the Beckton gasworks; the sailing ship for the docks and the rising sun for "the ascending of East Ham, which within a few years developed with such marvellous rapidity."

== Politics ==
In common with most boroughs, early elections were officially non-political and were often uncontested. In 1906 a Labour Representation Committee was formed in East Ham, and it affiliated with the national Labour Party in 1908. In response, and in imitation of the highly successful London Municipal Reform Party, the local Conservative and Liberal organisations formed an anti-Labour Municipal Alliance.

The Alliance, which also embraced independent and ratepayer candidates, secured a large majority at the municipal elections of 1907, with Labour forming the opposition on the council.

In 1928 the elections produced a hung council, with Labour and the Municipal Alliance each having 20 members. In the following year a single gain saw Labour take control, which they were to retain for the remainder of the borough's existence. The defeated opposition group stood as "Anti-Labour" from the next elections in 1929 and were retitled as the Civic Party in 1933.

When local elections were resumed after the Second World War, Labour faced official Conservative candidates for the first time. Conservatives formed a small opposition group, later supplanted by Independents. After the final municipal elections in 1963, Labour held 30 seats and Independents 10.

== Abolition ==
The county borough, along with the County Borough of West Ham, was abolished and became part of the London Borough of Newham in 1965 when Greater London was created. Although the County Borough was administratively independent from Essex, it did form part of the county, and so like the other Essex authorities incorporated into Greater London, the majority of its public records up to 1965 are held in the Essex County Record Office in Chelmsford. Discussions are continuing between county and London Borough archivists which may lead to the return of records to their originating districts.

== Demographics ==
Population of East Ham from 1801 to 1911

Year	1801	1851	1861	1881	1891	1901	1911
Population	<2000	<2000	2,858	10,706	32,713	96,018	133,487
Dwellings	n/a	n/a	497	1,930	5,818	17,937	25,694

== Gallery ==
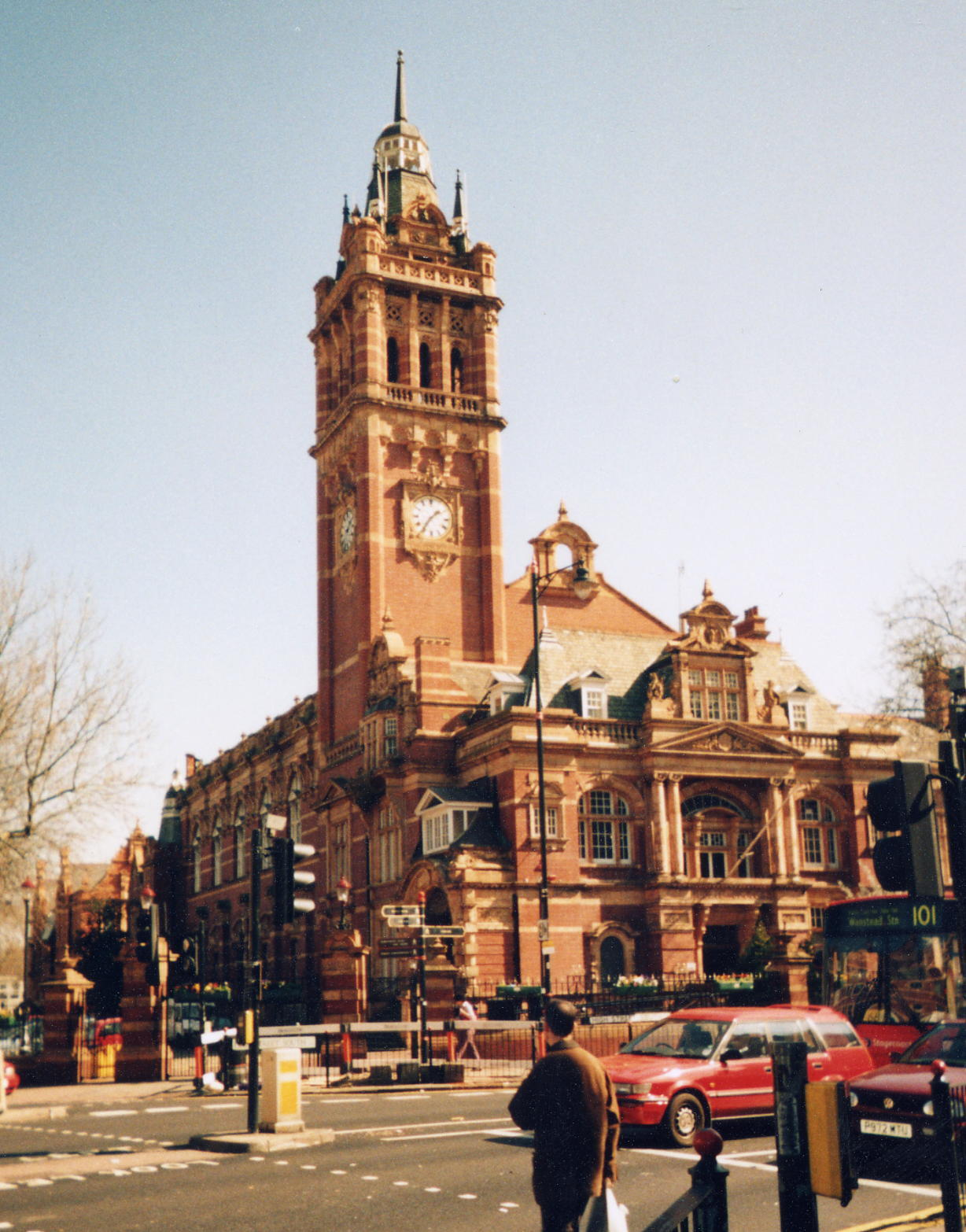
East Ham Town Hall

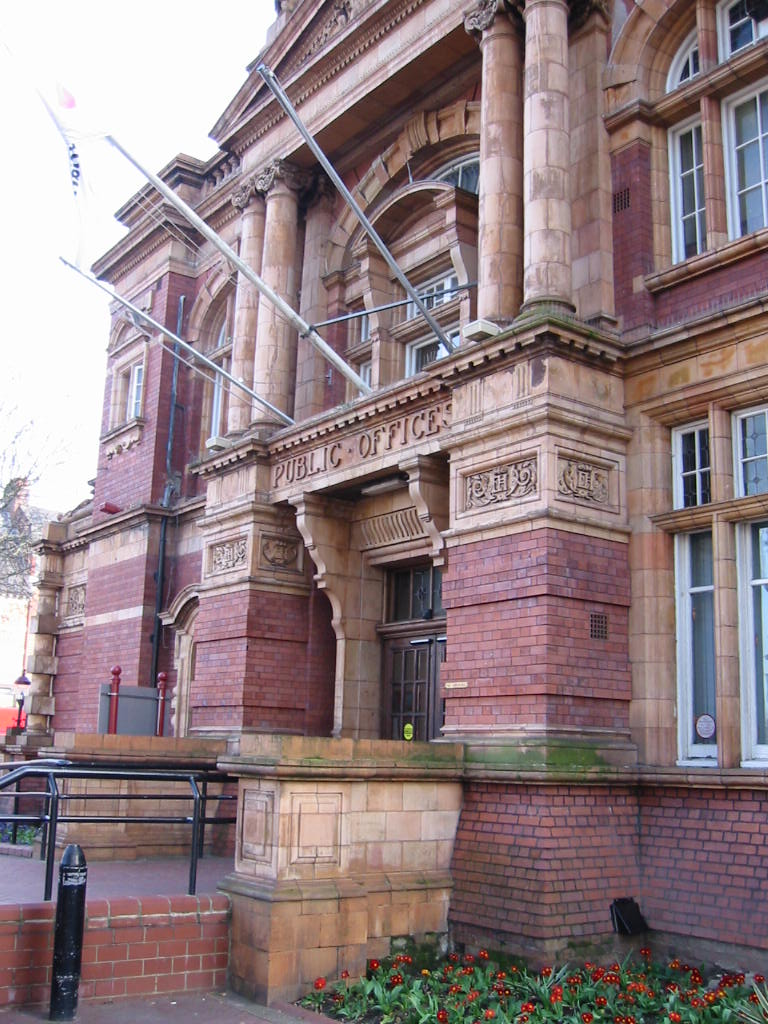
Entrance to town hall. Note the EH around the doorway for East Ham.
