= List of administrative counties and county boroughs of England by population in 1971 =

This is a list of administrative counties and county boroughs of England by population as at the 1971 census.

== Administrative counties ==
Administrative counties did not include the county boroughs, see below for their populations.

Rank	Administrative county	Population
1	Greater London	7,452,343
2	Lancashire	2,509,267
3	Yorkshire, West Riding	1,793,473
4	Kent	1,366,296
5	Essex	1,195,250
6	Cheshire	1,108,775
7	Surrey	1,002,892
8	Hampshire	999,056
9	Hertfordshire	924,641
10	Durham	814,396
11	Staffordshire	736,870
12	Nottinghamshire	675,770
13	Derbyshire	665,548
14	Warwickshire	625,229
15	Somerset	597,991
16	Buckinghamshire	587,556
17	Gloucestershire	559,821
18	Northumberland	504,207
19	Berkshire	503,921
20	Sussex, West	492,500
21	Leicestershire	487,893
22	Wiltshire	486,755
23	Worcestershire	456,230
24	Devon	453,969
25	Norfolk	445,302
26	Sussex, East	443,294
27	Cornwall	381,665
28	Lincolnshire, Parts of Lindsey	375,365
29	Dorset	361,925
30	Northamptonshire	341,981
31	Shropshire	337,104
32	Yorkshire, North Riding	329,423
33	Cambridgeshire and Isle of Ely	303,042
34	Bedfordshire	302,878
35	Oxfordshire	272,780
36	Suffolk, East	258,151
37	Yorkshire, East Riding	257,340
38	Cumberland	220,607
39	Huntingdon and Peterborough	202,622
40	Suffolk, West	164,732
41	Lincolnshire, Parts of Kesteven	158,279
42	Herefordshire	138,638
43	Isle of Wight	109,515
44	Lincolnshire, Parts of Holland	105,685
45	Westmorland	72,837
46	Rutland	27,471
TOTAL		32,611,285

== County boroughs ==
Rank	County borough	Associated county in census	Population
1	Birmingham	Warwickshire	1,014,669
2	Liverpool	Lancashire	610,114
3	Manchester	Lancashire	543,650
4	Sheffield	Yorkshire, West Riding	520,325
5	Leeds	Yorkshire, West Riding	496,010
6	Bristol	Gloucestershire	426,656
7	Teesside	Yorkshire, North Riding	396,233
8	Coventry	Warwickshire	335,239
9	Nottingham	Nottinghamshire	300,633
10	Bradford	Yorkshire, West Riding	294,175
11	Kingston upon Hull	Yorkshire, East Riding	285,969
12	Leicester	Leicestershire	284,210
13	Wolverhampton	Staffordshire	269,112
14	Stoke-on-Trent	Staffordshire	265,258
15	Plymouth	Devon	239,454
16	Newcastle upon Tyne	Northumberland	222,208
17	Derby	Derbyshire	219,582
18	Sunderland	Durham	217,075
19	Southampton	Hampshire	215,120
20	Portsmouth	Hampshire	197,429
21	Dudley	Staffordshire	185,581
22	Walsall	Staffordshire	184,734
23	West Bromwich	Staffordshire	166,592
24	Warley	Worcestershire	163,567
25	Southend-on-Sea	Essex	162,770
26	Luton	Bedfordshire	161,408
27	Brighton	East Sussex	161,352
28	Bolton	Lancashire	154,202
29	Bournemouth	Hampshire	153,871
30	Blackpool	Lancashire	151,857
31	Stockport	Cheshire	139,643
32	Birkenhead	Cheshire	137,850
33	Reading	Berkshire	132,939
34	Huddersfield	Yorkshire, West Riding	131,190
35	Salford	Lancashire	130,977
36	Northampton	Northamptonshire	126,644
37	Ipswich	East Suffolk	123,313
38	Norwich	Norfolk	122,083
39	Torbay	Devon	109,260
40	Oxford	Oxfordshire	108,804
41	Solihull	Warwickshire	107,093
42	Oldham	Lancashire	105,914
43	York	Yorkshire, West Riding	104,783
44	St Helens	Lancashire	104,340
45	Blackburn	Lancashire	101,817
46	South Shields	Durham	100,661
47	Preston	Lancashire	98,090
48	Wallasey	Cheshire	97,216
49	Hartlepool	Durham	97,094
50	Exeter	Devon	95,726
51	Grimsby	Lincolnshire	95,540
52	Gateshead	Durham	94,468
53	Rochdale	Lancashire	91,450
54	Halifax	Yorkshire, West Riding	91,273
55	Gloucester	Gloucestershire	90,233
56	Darlington	Durham	85,939
57	Rotherham	Yorkshire, West Riding	84,802
58	Bath	Somerset	84,674
59	Southport	Lancashire	84,571
60	Doncaster	Yorkshire, West Riding	82,668
61	Wigan	Lancashire	81,144
62	Burnley	Lancashire	76,512
63	Barnsley	Yorkshire, West Riding	75,397
64	Bootle	Lancashire	74,295
65	Lincoln	Lincolnshire, Parts of Kesteven	74,270
66	Worcester	Worcestershire	73,454
67	Hastings	East Sussex	72,410
68	Carlisle	Cumberland	71,580
69	Eastbourne	East Sussex	70,920
70	Tynemouth	Northumberland	69,339
71	Warrington	Lancashire	68,322
72	Bury	Lancashire	67,848
73	Barrow-in-Furness	Lancashire	64,035
74	Chester	Chester	62,913
75	Wakefield	Yorkshire, West Riding	59,591
76	Dewsbury	Yorkshire, West Riding	51,326
77	Great Yarmouth	Norfolk	50,236
78	Burton upon Trent	Staffordshire	50,201
79	Canterbury	Kent	33,175
TOTAL			13,407,078
