= Municipal Borough of Barking =

Former local government area in the UK

Barking Barking Town (1882–1931)
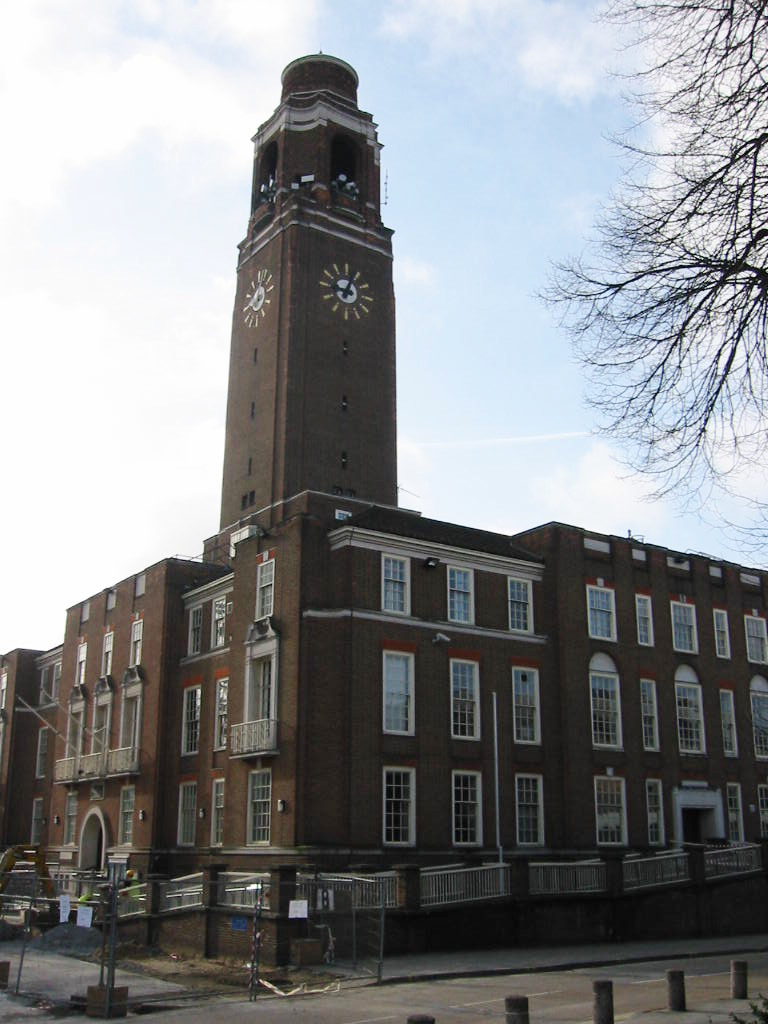
- Barking Town Hall (built 1958)

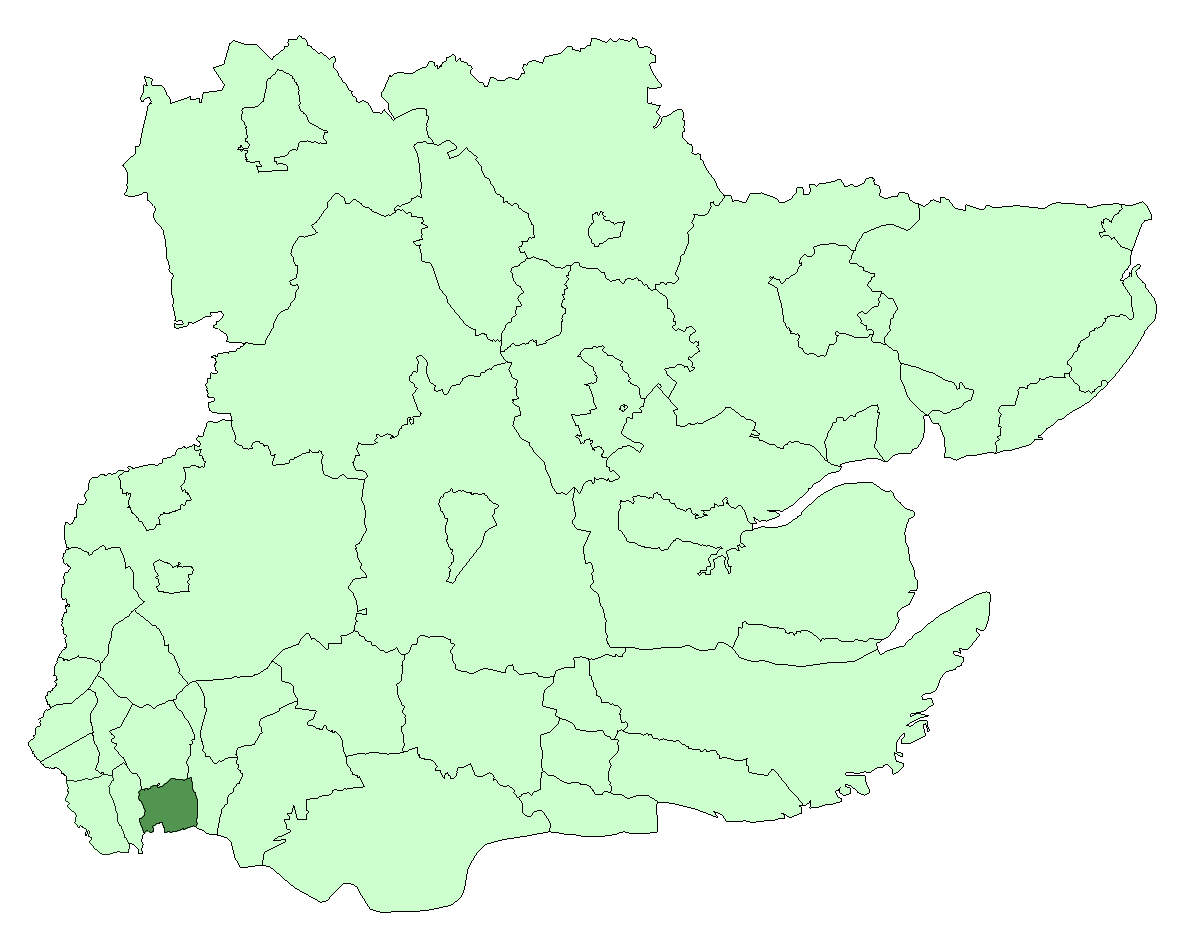
- Barking within Essex in 1961
- Area
  - 1911: 3,805 acres (15.4 km^{2})
  - 1931: 3,809 acres (15.4 km^{2})
  - 1961: 3,877 acres (15.7 km^{2})
  - Coordinates: 51.5358°N 0.0785°E
- Population
  - 1911: 31,294
  - 1931: 51,270
  - 1961: 72,293
- Density
  - 1911: 8.2/acre
  - 1931: 13.5/acre
  - 1961: 18.6/acre
- History
  - Origin: Barking ancient parish
  - Created: 1882
  - Abolished: 1965
  - Succeeded by: London Borough of Barking; London Borough of Newham
- Status: Local board district (1882–1894); Civil parish (1888–1965); Urban district (1894–1931); Municipal borough (1931–1965)
- Government: Barking Town Local Board (1882–1894); Barking Town Urban District Council (1894–1931); Barking Borough Council (1931–1965)
  - HQ: Barking Town Hall, Clockhouse Avenue
  - Motto: Dei gratia sumus quod sumus (By the grace of God we are what we are)
- Coat of arms of the borough council

Barking was a local government district, and later civil parish and borough, in southwest Essex, England from 1882 to 1965. It was known as Barking Town from 1882 to 1931. The district included the town of Barking, eastern Beckton and the southwestern part of the Becontree estate. The district experienced a steady increase in population during its existence. The area was suburban to London's conurbation region and was part of the Metropolitan Police District. It now forms the western part of the London Borough of Barking and Dagenham and the eastern extremity of the London Borough of Newham in Greater London.

== Background ==
The ancient parish of Barking covered an area of 12,307 acres (49.80 km^{2}) in the Becontree hundred. The parish was the largest in Essex in terms of area and was divided into the four wards of Town, Ripple, Great Ilford and Chadwell. The Town ward covered land immediately to the east and west of the River Roding and the Ripple ward stretched from Longbridge Road in the north to the River Thames in the south taking in Creekmouth and the western part of the modern estate of Becontree. Chadwell ward was immediately to the northeast including Goodmayes, part of Chadwell Heath and Little Heath. Great Ilford was to the northwest and included the modern areas of Barkingside, Clayhall, Gants Hill, Ilford, Redbridge and Seven Kings.

== Formation ==
A map showing the wards of Barking Civil Parish as they appeared in 1871.

A local board was formed for Town ward in 1882 and was extended to cover Ripple ward in 1885. In 1888 Barking parish was reduced in size, to match the area of the local board, as the Chadwell and Great Ilford wards formed a new parish of Ilford. In 1894 the area of the local board became the Barking Town urban district of Essex, as part of the Local Government Act 1894, and the Ilford parish became the Ilford Urban District.

== District and borough ==
The district gained the status of municipal borough in 1931 and was renamed Barking. The borough ran its own tram services, Barking Town Urban District Council Light Railways, until they became the responsibility of the London Passenger Transport Board in 1933. The borough bordered East Ham to the west, Ilford to the north and Dagenham to the east. In the south the borough bordered the River Thames, with the Metropolitan Borough of Woolwich in the County of London to the south. There was also a land boundary as the eastern part of the North Woolwich exclave was surrounded by Barking on three sides.

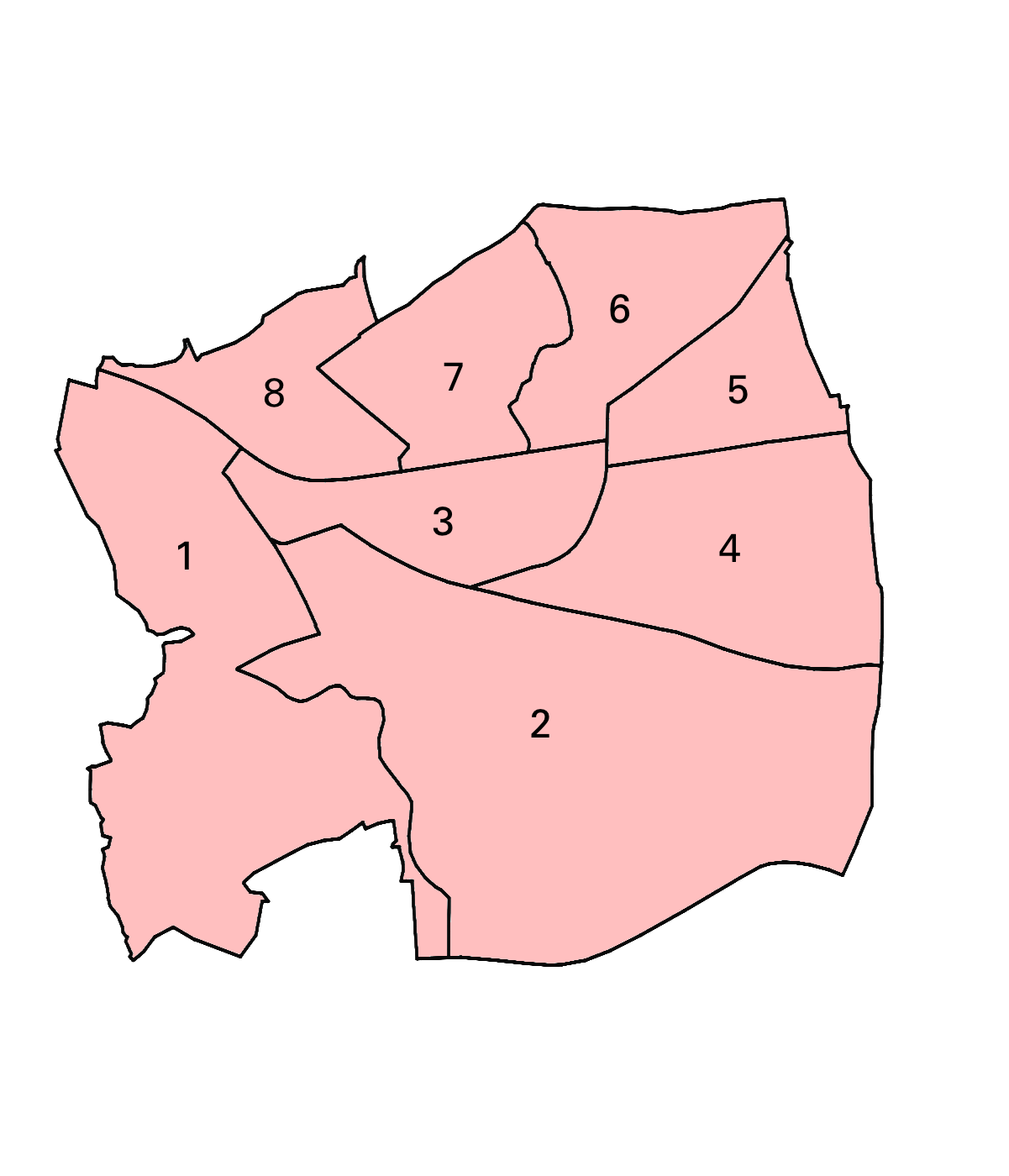
The electoral wards used in the Municipal Borough. 1. Abbey 2. Gascoigne 3. Eastbury 4. Cambell 5. Parsloes 6. Manor 7: Longbridge 8: Park

== Abolition ==
Since the building of the Becontree estate in the 1920s across the three districts of Ilford, Barking and Dagenham, there had been periodic discussion and review of the local government arrangements in the area. The districts were all considered to form part of the Greater London conurbation and in 1957 formed part of the review area of the Royal Commission on Local Government in Greater London. The 1960 report of the commission recommended the union of Barking and Dagenham as a single London borough. Following the review, in 1965 the London Government Act 1963 abolished the municipal boroughs of Barking and Dagenham, and transferred their former area from Essex to Greater London, to form the London Borough of Barking. The section of Barking west of the River Roding around Beckton became part of the London Borough of Newham.
