= London Traffic Act 1924 =

Act of the Parliament of the United Kingdom

London Traffic Act 1924 (Note: Section 17(1).)
- Act of Parliament
- Parliament of the United Kingdom
- Long title: An Act to make provision for the control and regulation of traffic in and near London, and for purposes connected therewith.
- Citation: 14 & 15 Geo. 5. c. 34
- Introduced by: Harry Gosling (Commons); Lord Parmoor, Lord President of the Council (Lords)
- Territorial extent: United Kingdom

Dates
- Royal assent: 7 August 1924
- Commencement: various
- Expired: 1 December 1928 (Note: Section 17(2).)
- Repealed: 1 September 1960
Other legislation
| Repealed by | Road Traffic Act 1960 |

Status: Repealed

Text of statute as originally enacted

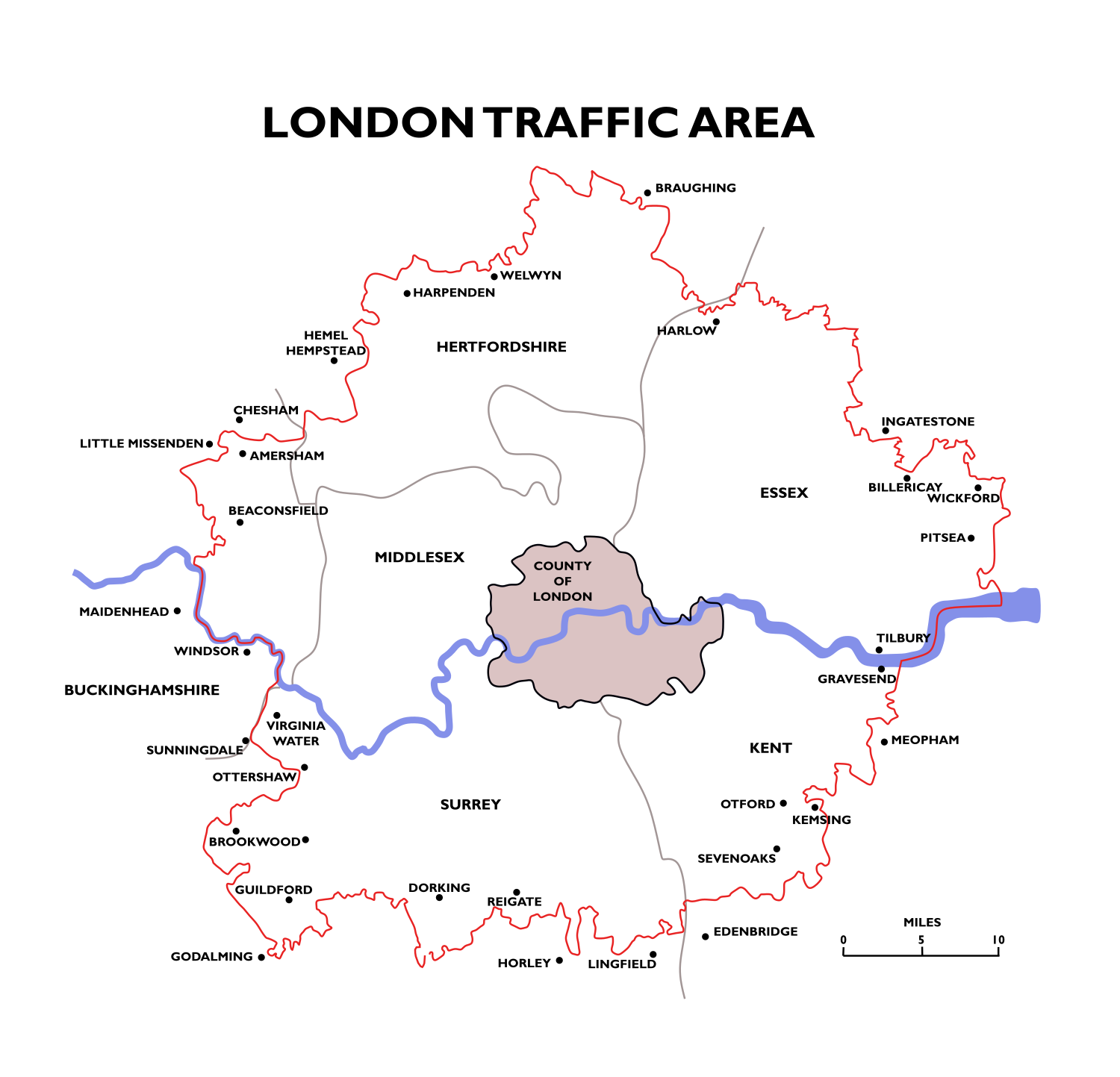
Map of the London Transport Area (red outline) covering the County of London, Middlesex and parts of Buckinghamshire, Essex, Hertfordshire, Kent and Surrey.

The London Traffic Act 1924 (14 & 15 Geo. 5. c. 34) was an act of the Parliament of the United Kingdom. The purpose of the act was stated to be the facilitating and improving the regulation of traffic in and near London.

== Background ==
The London Traffic Bill was drawn up in response to the emergence of small independent bus operators – labelled "pirates" – on the streets of London. The independents disrupted the monopoly of omnibus operation held by the Underground Group and British Electric Traction, who had since 1912 pooled their receipts in the capital. The three tramway companies in London, being jointly under the ownership of the two groups were also part of the "pool".

The first "pirate" operator, Arthur Partridge, began alternative service outside the monopoly with a Leyland Bus, dubbed the "Chocolate Express", on 5 August 1922. By 1924 an estimated 500 independent buses were competing with the pool companies. Most of the independent operations owned only one or two buses, and while many operated a reputable service, others served only the busiest routes at peak times, sometimes discharging passengers before the route's end in order to pursue more profitable traffic, or cutting in front of a competitor's bus.

The independents impacted heavily on the traffic of the tramways, and in June 1923 the three tram company operators proposed to cut the wages of tramway workers. The Transport and General Workers Union countered by making a claim for increased pay. On 21 March 1924, the tram workers went on strike, and they were joined by the crews of the large bus operators. Three days later, it was announced that workers on the underground railways were to join the stoppage on 28 March.

The minority Labour government, led by Ramsay MacDonald moved quickly with plans to place "the passenger traffic of the metropolitan area under some co-ordinating control", and the London Traffic Bill received its first reading on 25 March. On 28 March the strike was called off. The London Traffic Act 1924 received royal assent on 7 August.

== Provisions ==
=== Advisory Committee and Traffic Area ===
Among the provisions of the act was the establishment of the London and Home Counties Traffic Advisory Committee, who were to "give advice and assistance" to the Minister of Transport in the "exercise and performance of his powers and duties in relation to traffic" within the prescribed London Traffic Area, an area with a radius of about 25 miles from Charing Cross. The committee was constituted on 1 September 1924. Before making an order or regulation under the act the minister was to refer a draft to the committee for their "advice and report". The committee were also empowered to make inquiries, and issued a number of reports into such matters as cross-river transport, congestion and car-parking.

=== Restricted streets orders ===
Section 7 of the act gave the minister the power to make an order declaring any thoroughfare in the City of London or the Metropolitan Police District a "restricted street", in which no additional omnibuses other than those already operating there could "ply for hire". The first such order was made on 12 January 1925, but with retrospective effect to the beginning of the year, and listed most of the streets in central London. The effect of this was that once a street became restricted, the existing operators enjoyed a monopoly of supply. This was soon exploited by the London "pool" operators who bought out many of the small undertakings, with the number of independent buses reduced to an estimated 145 by 1927.

== Reception ==
The act was criticised for being protectionist, and ending competition in bus services in London. Herbert Morrison, Labour MP for South Hackney, and a future Minister of Transport, voted against the Bill on the grounds that it weakened the power of local government, in particular the London County Council.

== Subsequent developments ==
The Road Traffic Act 1930 (20 & 21 Geo. 5. c. 43) introduced licensing for bus services throughout the country, with the minister's role in the capital being replaced by the Commissioner of the Metropolitan Police acting as Traffic Commissioner for the Metropolitan Area. Three years later the various public transport operators in London passed to the London Passenger Transport Board which gained a monopoly on road passenger services in its "special area".

The Advisory Committee continued to exist, and was remodelled under the London Passenger Transport Act 1933 (23 & 24 Geo. 5. c. 14) to better represent the local authorities of the Traffic Area. Both the committee and the London Traffic Area were abolished in 1965 by the London Government Act 1963.
