= Ilford Urban District Council Tramways =

Tramway operator in England

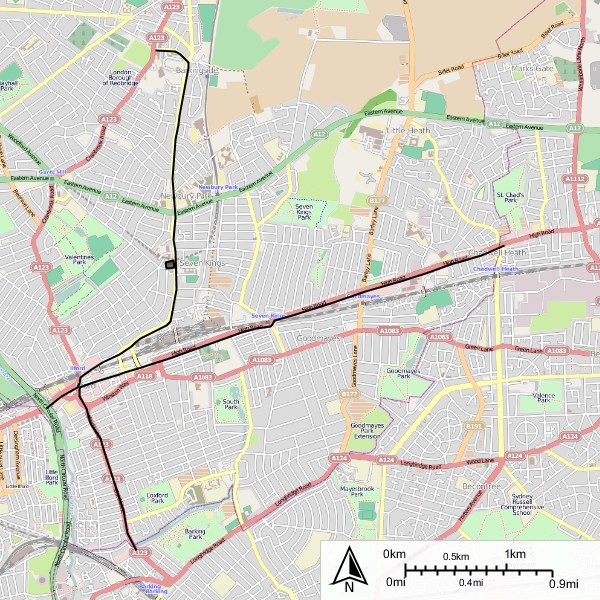
- Map of the routes of the Ilford Urban District Council Tramways

Operation
- Locale: Ilford
- Open: 14 March 1903
- Close: 1 July 1933
- Status: Closed

Infrastructure
- Track gauge: 1,435 mm (4 ft 8 1/2 in)
- Propulsion system: Electric

Statistics
- Route length: 6.66 miles (10.72 km)

Ilford Urban District Council Tramways operated a passenger tramway service in Ilford between 1903 and 1933.

== History ==
Ilford Urban District Council started services on 14 March 1903. On 12 April 1905 they took control of the Ilford Hill section of the East Ham Corporation Tramways. On 1 October 1905, they took control of the Barking Town Urban District Council Tramways line from Longbridge Road to Loxford Bridge. On 1 June 1914 they took over the Barking Town Urban District Council Tramways Broadway, Barking Station to Loxford Bridge line.

== Closure ==
The services were taken over by London Passenger Transport Board on 1 July 1933.
