= West Ham Corporation Tramways =

Tramway operator in England

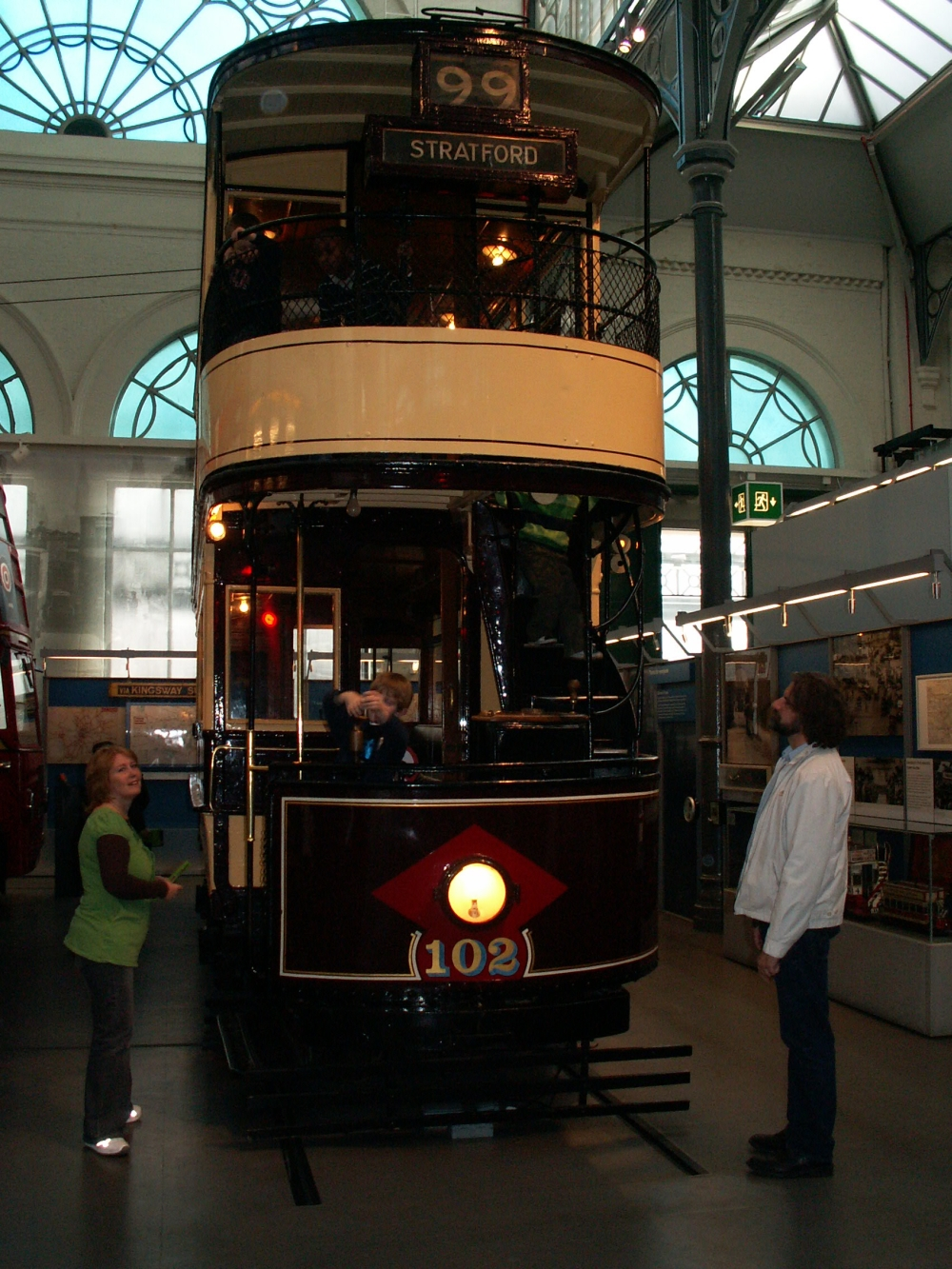
- West Ham Corporation Tramways tramcar 102 in the London Transport Museum

Operation
- Locale: West Ham, Essex
- Close: June 1937

Statistics
North Metropolitan Tramways era: before–1903
- Status: Closed
- Operator: North Metropolitan Tramways
- Track gauge: 1,435 mm (4 ft 8 1/2 in) standard gauge
- Propulsion system: Horse-drawn
West Ham Corporation Tramways era: 1903–1933
- Status: Closed
- Owner: West Ham Corporation
- Operator: West Ham Corporation
- Track gauge: 1,435 mm (4 ft 8 1/2 in) standard gauge
- Propulsion system: Electric
- Depots: West Ham Tram Depot, Greengate Street
- Route length: 16.8 miles (27.0 km)
London Transport era: 1933–1937
- System: London Transport
- Status: Converted to trolleybus operation
- Owner: London Passenger Transport Board
- Operator: London Passenger Transport Board
- Track gauge: 1,435 mm (4 ft 8 1/2 in) standard gauge
- Propulsion system: Electric
- Depots: West Ham Tram Depot (WH), Greengate Street

West Ham Corporation Tramways operated a tramway service in the County Borough of West Ham between 1901 and 1933.

== History ==
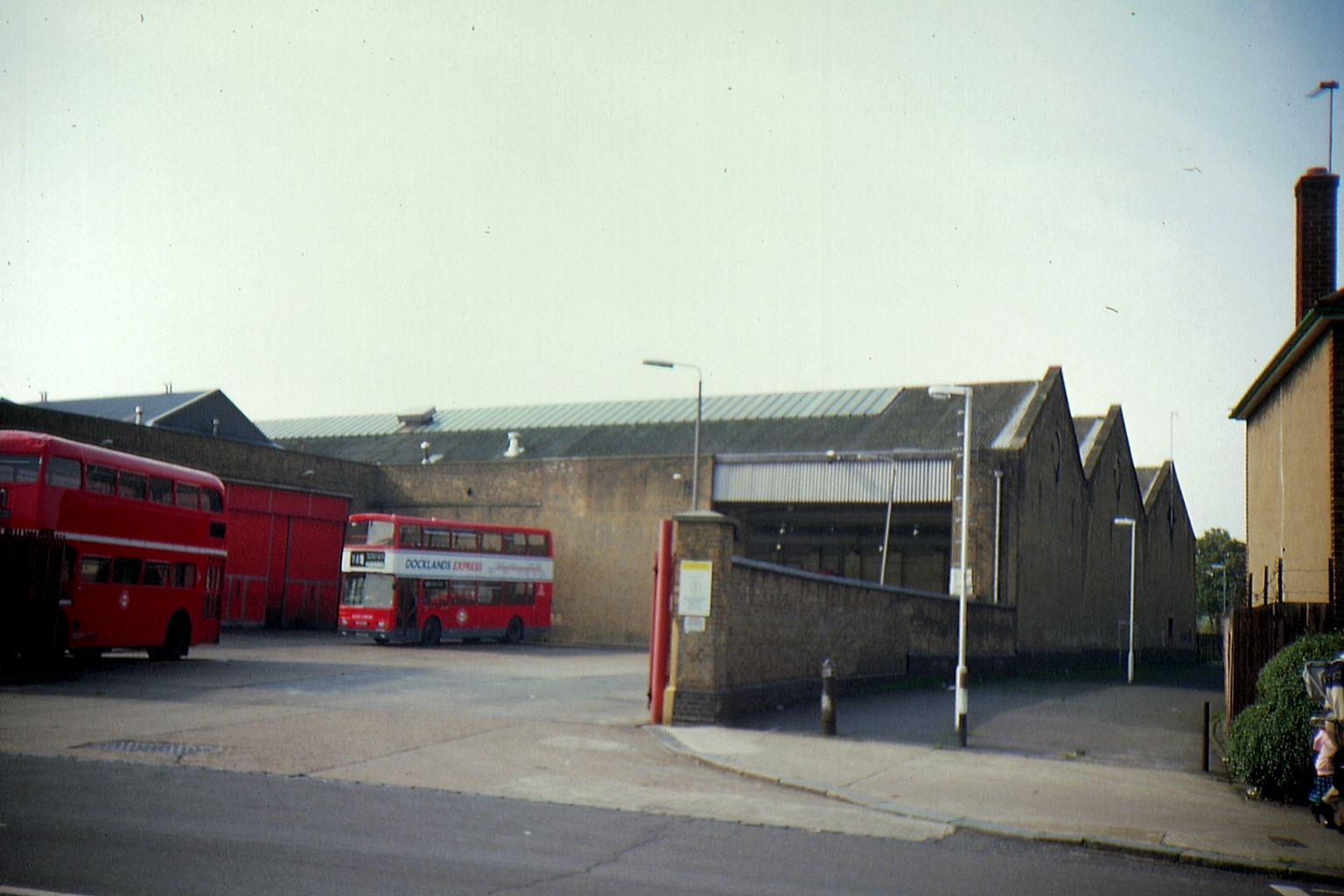
Situated in Greengate Street, West Ham, this tram depot opened in October 1906, then housed trolleybuses from June 1937 until April 1960. Motorbus operation commenced in November 1959 until October 1992 when the garage closed. It has since been demolished.

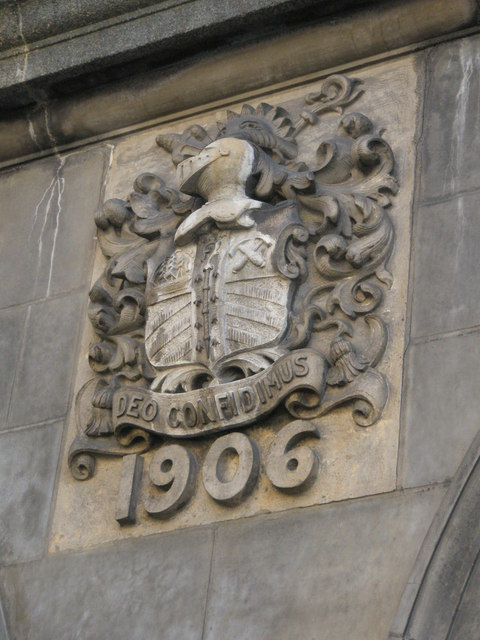
Date stone on the former Tramway offices

West Ham Corporation took over the North Metropolitan Tramways horse drawn services in stages starting on 1 July 1903. A programme of modernisation and electrification was undertaken, and the first electric services ran on 27 February 1904.

The company built up a fleet of 134 tramcars in a chocolate and cream livery.

The company experimented with trolley buses as early as 1912. At the annual conference of the Municipal Tramways Association from 25 to 27 September 1912, an Austrian Cédès-Stoll was the first trolleybus to carry passengers in London, along Greengate Street.

== Closure ==
The services were taken over by London Passenger Transport Board on 1 July 1933.
