= East Ham Corporation Tramways =

Passenger tramway service in East Ham

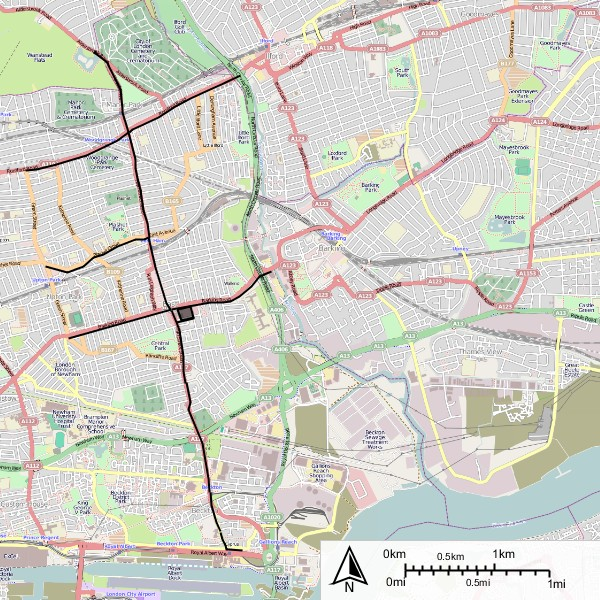
- Map of the routes of the East Ham Corporation Tramways

Operation
- Locale: East Ham
- Open: 22 June 1901
- Close: 1 July 1933
- Status: Closed

Infrastructure
- Track gauge: 1,435 mm (4 ft 8 1/2 in)
- Propulsion system: Electric
- Depots: Nelson Street, East Ham

Statistics
- Route length: 8.34 miles (13.42 km)

East Ham Corporation Tramways operated a passenger tramway service in East Ham between 1901 and 1933.

== History ==
East Ham was authorised to construct tramways by the East Ham Urban District Council Tramways Order 1900; it started services on 22 June 1901.

The depot and power station were located off Nelson Street, opposite the junction with Poulett Road, at TQ 4273 8349.

== Fleet ==
- 1–20 Dick, Kerr & Co. 1901
- 21–35 Dick, Kerr & Co. 1902
- 36–40 Dick, Kerr & Co. 1905
- 41–45 Dick, Kerr & Co. 1910
- 46 second hand car No 9 from Barking Town Urban District Council Light Railways
- 47–52 Brush Electrical Engineering Company 1921
- 37–40 Brush Electrical Engineering Company 1921 (replacing 37–40 of 1905)
- 51–60 Brush Electrical Engineering Company 1927 (51 and 52 replacing those of 1921)
- 61–70 Brush Electrical Engineering Company 1928

== Closure ==
The services were taken over by London Passenger Transport Board on 1 July 1933.
