= London Passenger Transport Board =

London transport authority, 1933–1948

- First logo, used for a very short time in 1933 before the Board introduced the brand London Transport
- Successor: London Transport Executive
- Formation: 1 July 1933
- Dissolved: 31 December 1947
- Type: Public body
- Legal status: Dissolved
- Headquarters: 55 Broadway, London
- Region served: Greater London and within 30 miles (48 km) of Charing Cross
- Main organ: London Transport

The London Passenger Transport Board was the organisation responsible for local public transport in London and its environs from 1933 to 1948. In common with all London transport authorities from 1933 to 2000, the public name and brand was London Transport.

== History ==
London Passenger Transport Act 1933 (Note: Section 109.)
- Act of Parliament
- Parliament of the United Kingdom
- Long title: An Act to provide for the establishment of a Passenger Transport Board for an area to be known as the London Passenger Transport Area, which shall comprise certain portions of the London Traffic Area and of the districts adjacent thereto, and for the transfer to that Board of various transport undertakings and interests; to make other provisions with respect to traffic in the said area; and for purposes connected with the matters aforesaid.
- Citation: 23 & 24 Geo. 5. c. 14
- Territorial extent: United Kingdom

Dates
- Royal assent: 13 April 1933
- Commencement: 13 April 1933 (Note: The Acts of Parliament (Commencement) Act 1793.)
Other legislation
Amended by	London Passenger Transport Act 1935; London Passenger Transport Act 1939; Transport Act 1947; Local Government Act 1948; Statute Law Revision Act 1950; Road Traffic Act 1956; Statute Law Revision Act 1959; Road Traffic Act 1960; Statute Law Revision Act 1960; Transport Act 1962; London Government Act 1963; Transport (London) Act 1969; Statute Law (Repeals) Act 1976; Transfer of Functions (Transport) Order 1981; London Transport Act 1982; London Regional Transport Act 1984; Gas Act 1986; Statute Law (Repeals) Act 1993; Transport for London (Consequential Provisions) Order 2003; Statute Law (Repeals) Act 2004

Status: Partially repealed

Text of statute as originally enacted

Revised text of statute as amended

Text of the London Passenger Transport Act 1933 as in force today (including any amendments) within the United Kingdom, from legislation.gov.uk.

The London Passenger Transport Board (LPTB) was established pursuant to the London Passenger Transport Act 1933 (23 & 24 Geo. 5. c. 14) enacted on 13 April 1933. The bill had been introduced by Herbert Morrison, who was Transport Minister in the Labour Government until 1931. Because the legislation was a hybrid bill it had been possible to allow it to "roll over" into the new parliament under the incoming National Government. The new government, although dominated by Conservatives, decided to continue with the bill, with no serious changes, despite its extensive transfer of private undertakings into the public sector. On 1 July 1933, the LPTB came into being, covering the "London Passenger Transport Area".

The LPTB's financial structure was not the same as that of outright nationalisation, which did not occur until the London Transport Executive was established on 1 January 1948. When the LPTB was formed in 1933, the companies taken over, notably the Underground Group and Thomas Tilling's London operations, were 'bought' partially with cash and partially by the issue of interest-bearing stock – London Transport stock – authorised by the enabling act, which meant that those former businesses continued to earn yields from their holdings.

== The board ==
Under the 1933 act, the chairman and six other members of the board were appointed by five (later six) appointing trustees. The trustees were:

- the chairman of the London County Council
- a representative of the London and Home Counties Traffic Advisory Committee
- the Chairman of the Committee of the London Clearing Banks
- the president of the Law Society of England and Wales
- the president of the Institute of Chartered Accountants in England and Wales

The act required that the board members should be 'persons who have had wide experience, and have shown capacity, in transport, industrial, commercial or financial matters or in the conduct of public affairs and, in the case of two members, shall be persons who have had not less than six years' experience in local government within the London Passenger Transport Area."

The first chairman and vice-chairman were Lord Ashfield and Frank Pick, who had held similar positions with the Underground Group. Members of the board had a term of office of between three and seven years, and were eligible for reappointment.

=== Members ===
- Lord Ashfield, 1933–1947
- Frank Pick, 1933–1940
- Sir John Gilbert (London County Council), 1933–1934
- Sir Edward Holland (Surrey County Council), 1933–1939
- Patrick Ashley Cooper, Governor of the Hudson's Bay Company, director of the Bank of England, 1933–47
- Sir Henry Maybury, civil engineer, chairman of the London and Home Counties Traffic Advisory Committee, 1933–1943
- John Cliff, secretary of the Transport and General Workers Union, 1933–1947
- Charles Latham, (London County Council) 1935–1947
- Colonel Forrester Clayton, 1939–1947
- Colonel Charles Geoffrey Vickers, 1941–47
- William B Neville, 1946–47
- Sir Gilfrid Craig, 1944–46
- Sir Edward Hardy, 1946–47
- Geoffrey Hayworth, 1942–47

Latham and Cliff became Chairman and Vice-Chairman of the successor London Transport Executive in 1947.

== London Passenger Transport Area ==
The London Passenger Transport Area (LPTA) had an approximate radius of 30 miles (48 km) from Charing Cross, extending beyond the boundaries of what later officially became Greater London, to Baldock in the North, Brentwood in the East, Horsham in the South and High Wycombe in the West. The LPTA had an area of 1,986 square miles (5,140 km^{2}). The LPTA overlapped with the London Traffic Area (LTA) defined by the London Traffic Act 1924 and the part of the LPTA that was within the LTA was defined as the "special area" within which the LPTB had a monopoly of local road public transport.

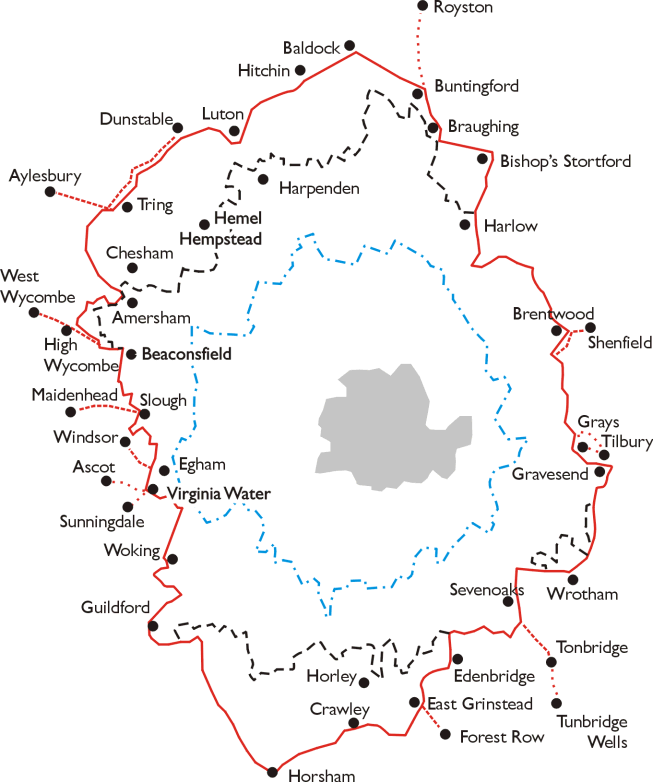
The London Passenger Transport Area (1933–1947) is outlined in red, with the LPTB "special area", in which it had a monopoly of local road public transport, shown by a broken black line. The boundary of the Metropolitan Police District at the time is shown as a blue broken line, and the County of London is shaded in grey. Roads over which the LPTB was allowed to run services outside its area are shown by broken red lines.

Within the special area services operated by the LPTB, it did not need road service licences, and no person or undertaking was allowed to provide a public road service without written permission from the LPTB. In the London Passenger Transport Area outside the special area, the LPTB was required to hold road service licences.

== Responsibilities ==
Under the Act the LPTB acquired the following concerns:

=== Railways ===
- Underground Electric Railways Company of London, which controlled:
  - London Electric Railway, the management company of:
    - Bakerloo line
    - Piccadilly line
    - Hampstead & Highgate line (now Northern line Charing Cross, Edgware and High Barnet branches)
  - City and South London Railway (now Northern line Bank and Morden branches)
  - Central London Railway
  - District Railway
- Metropolitan Railway, which controlled:
  - Great Northern & City Railway

=== Tramways and trolleybuses ===
- London County Council (167.17 miles or 269.03 kilometres of route, including tracks owned by the Borough of Leyton and the City of London, and 1,713 trams)
- Middlesex County Council (42.63 miles or 68.61 kilometres of route, leased to Metropolitan Electric Tramways)
- Hertfordshire County Council (21.5 miles or 34.6 kilometres of route, leased to Metropolitan Electric Tramways)
- City of London (0.25 miles or 0.40 kilometres of route, operated by London County Council)
- Barking Corporation (operated by Ilford Corporation, London County Council and East Ham Corporation since 1929) (1.8 miles or 2.9 kilometres of route)
- Bexley and Dartford urban district councils (joint undertaking since 1921) (10.29 miles or 16.56 kilometres of route and 33 trams)
- Croydon Corporation Tramways (9.28 miles or 14.93 kilometres of route and 55 trams)
- East Ham Corporation Tramways (8.34 miles or 13.42 kilometres of route and 56 trams)
- Erith Urban District Council Tramways (4 miles or 6.4 kilometres)
- Ilford Urban District Council Tramways (7.13 miles or 11.47 kilometres of route and 40 trams)
- Leyton Corporation Tramways (operated by London County Council since 1921) (9.0 miles or 14.5 kilometres of routes)
- Walthamstow Urban District Council Light Railways (8.93 miles or 14.37 kilometres of route and 62 trams)
- West Ham Corporation Tramways (16.27 miles or 26.18 kilometres of route and 134 trams)
- London United Tramways (29.05 miles or 46.75 kilometres of route, 150 trams and 61 trolleybuses)
- Metropolitan Electric Tramways (53.51 miles or 86.12 kilometres of route, of which 9.38 miles (15.10 km) were owned by the company, 46.23 miles (74.40 km) leased from Middlesex County Council and 21.5 miles or 34.6 kilometres from Hertfordshire County Council and 316 trams)
- South Metropolitan Electric Tramways (13.08 miles or 21.05 kilometres of route and 52 trams)

=== Buses and coaches ===
- London General Omnibus Company
  - Green Line Coaches
- Overground
- Tilling & British Automobile Traction

== Further history ==
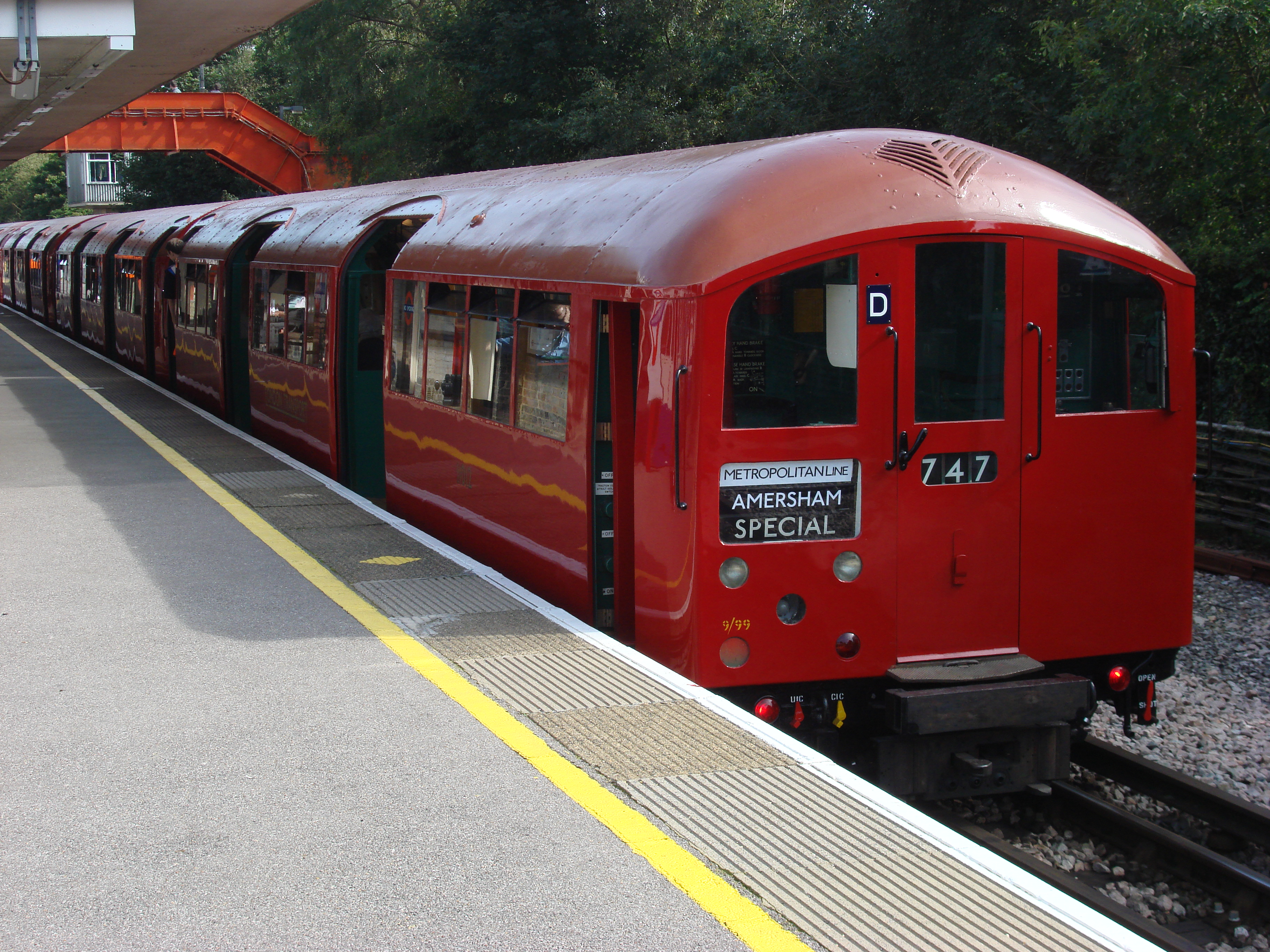
1938 tube stock

AEC Regent III RT

The LPTB was a quasi-public organisation akin to a modern quango with considerable autonomy granted to its senior executives. It enjoyed a more or less full monopoly of transport services within its area, with the exception of those provided by the Big Four railway companies such as the Southern Railway. Consequently, it was empowered to enter into co-ordination agreements with the mainline railway companies concerning their suburban services. It was, to a limited extent, accountable to users via The London and Home Counties Traffic Advisory Committee.

Ninety-two transport and ancillary undertakings, with a capital of approximately £120 million, came under the LPTB. Central buses, trolleybuses, underground trains and trams were painted in "Underground" and "London General" red, coaches and country buses in green, with coaches branded Green Line. Already in use on most of the tube system, "UNDERGROUND" branding was extended to all lines and stations. The name was said to have been coined by Albert Stanley, 1st Baron Ashfield in 1908, when he was general manager of the Underground Group.

The LPTB embarked on a £35 million capital investment programme that extended services and reconstructed many existing assets, mostly under the umbrella of the 1935–1940 New Works Programme. Although only about £21 million of the capital was spent before World War Two broke out, it allowed extensions to the Central, Bakerloo, Northern and Metropolitan lines; built new trains and maintenance depots, with extensive rebuilding of many central area stations (such as Aldgate East); and replacement of much of the tram network by what was to become one of the world's largest trolleybus systems. During this period, two icons of London Transport were first seen: 1938 tube stock trains and the RT-type bus. Although curtailed and delayed by the outbreak of World War Two, the programme nevertheless delivered some key elements of the present overground sections of the Underground system. However, the most profound change enacted by the board, through the new works, was the transition from tram to trolleybus operation alluded to earlier. In 1933, the LPTB had operated 327 route miles of tramways and 18 route miles of trolleybuses. By 1948, these totals were 102 and 255 miles respectively, mainly by eliminating trams in North London. The final disappearance of trams, in 1952, was regretted by some sections of the staff and the public, but in terms of impact on users, this was probably the most visible and dramatic change in the period. The last of the 653 trolleybuses which ran were replaced by buses by 1961.

The LPTB continued to develop its corporate identity, design and commercial advertising that had been put in place by the Underground Group. This included stations designed by Charles Holden; bus garages by architects such as Wallis, Gilbert & Partners; and even more humble structures such as bus stops and shelters. The posters and advertising issued by the LPTB were often of exemplary quality and are still much sought after.

The LPTB was replaced in 1948 by the London Transport Executive, under the Transport Act 1947 (10 & 11 Geo. 6. c. 49). It was effectively nationalised, being taken under the wing of the British Transport Commission, which also ran much of the nation's other bus companies, an amount of road haulage, as well as the nation's railways, but it still retained considerable autonomy. The LPTB continued to exist as a legal entity until wound up on 23 December 1949.

== Bibliography ==
- T C Barker and Michael Robbins, A History of London Transport, Volume two – the Twentieth Century to 1970, George Allen & Unwin, 1974

Preceded by Various other	London public transport authority 1933–1948	Succeeded by London Transport Executive
