= County borough =

Borough or city independent of county council control

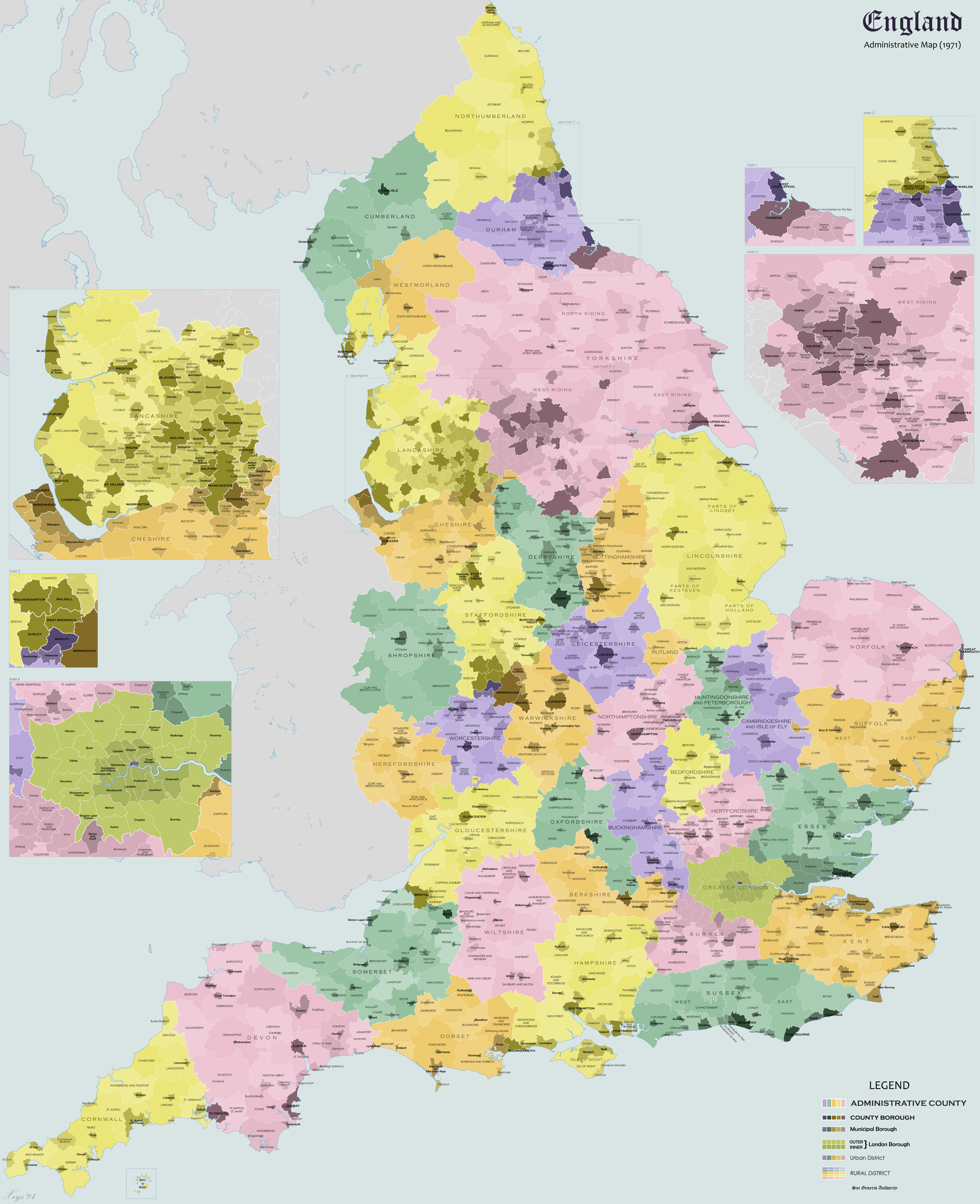
- Map of county boroughs in 1971 (named in boldface capitals), alongside administrative counties, municipal boroughs, urban districts, rural districts
- Category: Borough
- Location: England and Wales and Ireland
- Found in: Counties
- Created by: Local Government Act 1888; Local Government (Ireland) Act 1898; Local Government (Wales) Act 1994
- Created: England 1889; Wales 1889/1994; Ireland 1899
- Abolished by: Local Government (Boundaries) Act (Northern Ireland) 1971; Local Government Act 1972; Local Government Act 2001
- Abolished: Northern Ireland 1973 (local government); England and Wales 1974; Ireland 2002
- Number: 11 (as of 2008)
- Possible types: Lieutenancy area (2); Principal area (9)

County borough is a term introduced in 1889 in the United Kingdom of Great Britain and Ireland, to refer to a borough or a city independent of county council control, similar to the unitary authorities created since the 1990s. An equivalent term used in Scotland was a county of city. They were abolished by the Local Government Act 1972 in England and Wales, but continue in use for lieutenancy and shrievalty in Northern Ireland. In the Republic of Ireland they remain in existence but have been renamed cities under the provisions of the Local Government Act 2001. The Local Government (Wales) Act 1994 re-introduced the term for certain "principal areas" in Wales. Scotland did not have county boroughs but instead had counties of cities. These were abolished on 16 May 1975. All four Scottish cities of the time—Aberdeen, Dundee, Edinburgh, and Glasgow—were included in this category. There was an additional category of large burgh in the Scottish system (similar to a municipal borough in England and Wales), which were responsible for all services apart from police, education and fire.

== England and Wales ==
=== History ===
==== Initial creation ====
When county councils were first created in 1889, it was decided that to let them have authority over large towns or cities would be impractical, and so any large incorporated place would have the right to be a county borough, and thus independent from the administrative county it would otherwise come under. Some cities and towns were already independent counties corporate, and most were to become county boroughs. Originally ten county boroughs were proposed; Bristol, Hull, Newcastle upon Tyne and Nottingham, which were already counties, and Birmingham, Bradford, Leeds, Liverpool, Manchester, and Sheffield, which were not. The Local Government Act 1888 as eventually passed required a population of over 50,000 except in the case of existing counties corporate. This resulted in 61 county boroughs in England and two in Wales (Cardiff and Swansea). Several exceptions were allowed, mainly for historic towns, including Bath and Dudley, which would still remain below the 50,000 limit by the time of the 1901 census. Some of the smaller counties corporate—Berwick upon Tweed, Lichfield, Poole, Carmarthen and Haverfordwest—did not become county boroughs, although Canterbury, with a population under 25,000, did.

==== Growth ====
The county councils and county borough councils came into operation on 1 April 1889. Just seven months later, on 9 November 1889, the city of Oxford was the first borough which had not been made a county borough by the 1888 Act to be elevated to county borough status. Various other new county boroughs were constituted in the following decades, generally as more boroughs reached the 50,000 minimum and then promoted Acts to constitute them county boroughs. The granting of county borough status was the subject of much disagreement between the large municipal boroughs and the county councils. The population limit provided county councils with a disincentive to allow mergers or boundary amendments to districts that would create authorities with large populations, as this would allow them to seek county borough status and remove the tax base from the administrative county.

County boroughs to be constituted in this era were a mixed bag, including some towns that would continue to expand such as Bournemouth and Southend-on-Sea. Other towns such as Burton upon Trent and Dewsbury were not to increase in population much past 50,000. 1913 saw the attempts of Luton and Cambridge to gain county borough status defeated in the House of Commons, despite the approval of the Local Government Board – the removal of Cambridge from Cambridgeshire would have reduced the income of Cambridgeshire County Council by over half.

==== Slowdown ====
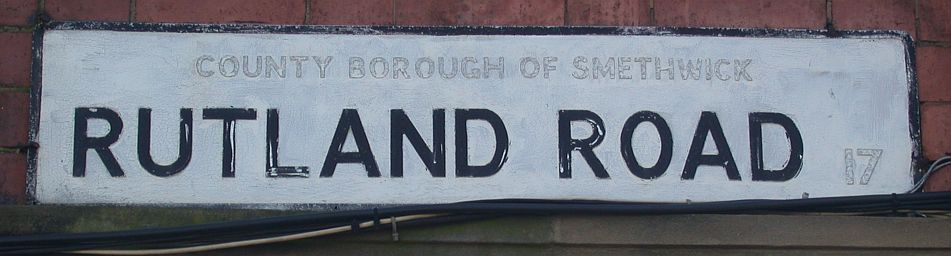
Street nameplate on Rutland Road, Smethwick in April 2007, showing painted out "County Borough" lettering.

Upon recommendation of a commission chaired by the Earl of Onslow, the population threshold was raised to 75,000 in 1926, by the Local Government (County Boroughs and Adjustments) Act 1926, which also made it much harder to expand boundaries. The threshold was raised to 100,000 by the Local Government Act 1958.

The viability of the county borough of Merthyr Tydfil came into question in the 1930s. Due to a decline in the heavy industries of the town, by 1932 more than half the male population was unemployed, resulting in very high municipal rates in order to make public assistance payments. At the same time the population of the borough was lower than when it had been created in 1908. A royal commission was appointed in May 1935 to "investigate whether the existing status of Merthyr Tydfil as a county borough should be continued, and if not, what other arrangements should be made". The commission reported the following November, and recommended that Merthyr should revert to the status of a non-county borough, and that public assistance should be taken over by central government. In the event county borough status was retained by the town, with the chairman of the Welsh Board of Health appointed as administrative adviser in 1936.

After the Second World War the creation of new county boroughs in England and Wales was effectively suspended, pending a local government review. A government white paper published in 1945 stated that "it is expected that there will be a number of Bills for extending or creating county boroughs" and proposed the creation of a boundary commission to bring coordination to local government reform. The policy in the paper also ruled out the creation of new county boroughs in Middlesex "owing to its special problems". The Local Government Boundary Commission was appointed on 26 October 1945, under the chairmanship of Sir Malcolm Trustram Eve, delivering its report in 1947. The commission recommended that towns with a population of 200,000 or more should become one-tier "new counties", with "new county boroughs" having a population of 60,000–200,000 being "most-purpose authorities", with the county council of the administrative county providing certain limited services. The report envisaged the creation of 47 two-tiered "new counties", 21 one-tiered "new counties" and 63 "new county boroughs". The recommendations of the commission extended to a review of the division of functions between different tiers of local government, and thus fell outside its terms of reference, and its report was not acted upon.

==== Partial reform ====
The next attempt at reform was by the Local Government Act 1958, which established the Local Government Commission for England and the Local Government Commission for Wales to carry out reviews of existing local government structures and recommend reforms. Although the Commissions did not complete their work before being dissolved, a handful of new county boroughs were constituted between 1964 and 1968. Luton, Torbay, and Solihull gained county borough status. Additionally, the Teesside was formed from a merger of the existing county borough of Middlesbrough, and the municipal boroughs of Stockton-on-Tees, Redcar and Thornaby; Warley was formed from the county borough of Smethwick and the non-county boroughs of Oldbury and Rowley Regis; and West Hartlepool was merged with Hartlepool. Following these changes, there was a total of 79 county boroughs in England. The Commission also recommended the downgrading of Barnsley to be a non-county borough, but this was not carried out.

==== Abolition ====
The county boroughs of East Ham, West Ham and Croydon were abolished in 1965 with the creation of Greater London and went on to form parts of London boroughs. The remaining county boroughs were abolished in 1974 under the Local Government Act 1972, and replaced with non-metropolitan districts and metropolitan districts, all beneath county councils in a two-tier structure. In Greater London and the metropolitan counties the lower tier districts retained a wider range of powers than in the non-metropolitan counties.

==== Revival ====
This situation did not persist long. In 1986 the metropolitan county councils and the Greater London Council were abolished, returning the metropolitan boroughs to a status equivalent to the former county boroughs, but sharing some powers (police and transport for example). In the 1990s, many of the non-metropolitan former county boroughs were reformed again as unitary authorities – essentially the same as a county borough. As a result, by 2015, most former county boroughs were either metropolitan boroughs or unitary authorities with a status similar to the old county boroughs. In England, most of those former county boroughs that did not gain unitary authority status—Barrow-in-Furness, Burnley, Canterbury, Carlisle, Chester, Eastbourne, Gloucester, Great Yarmouth, Hastings, Ipswich, Lincoln, Northampton, Norwich, Oxford, Preston, and Worcester—have given their names to non-unitary local government districts (in some cases coterminous with the old county borough, in other cases much larger). Burton upon Trent became an unparished area in the East Staffordshire borough, and has now been divided into several parishes.

In Wales, several principal areas are county boroughs:

- Newport (acquired city status in 2002)
- Merthyr Tydfil
- Caerphilly
- Blaenau Gwent
- Torfaen
- Vale of Glamorgan
- Bridgend
- Rhondda Cynon Taf
- Neath Port Talbot
- Wrexham
- Conwy

For all practical purposes, county boroughs are exactly the same as the other principal areas of Wales called "counties" (including "cities and counties") as all these areas are run by unitary authorities (i.e. have the functions of both boroughs and counties). Although unitary authorities are functionally equivalent to county boroughs, only in Wales is the title given official recognition by Act of Parliament.

=== English county boroughs in 1973 ===
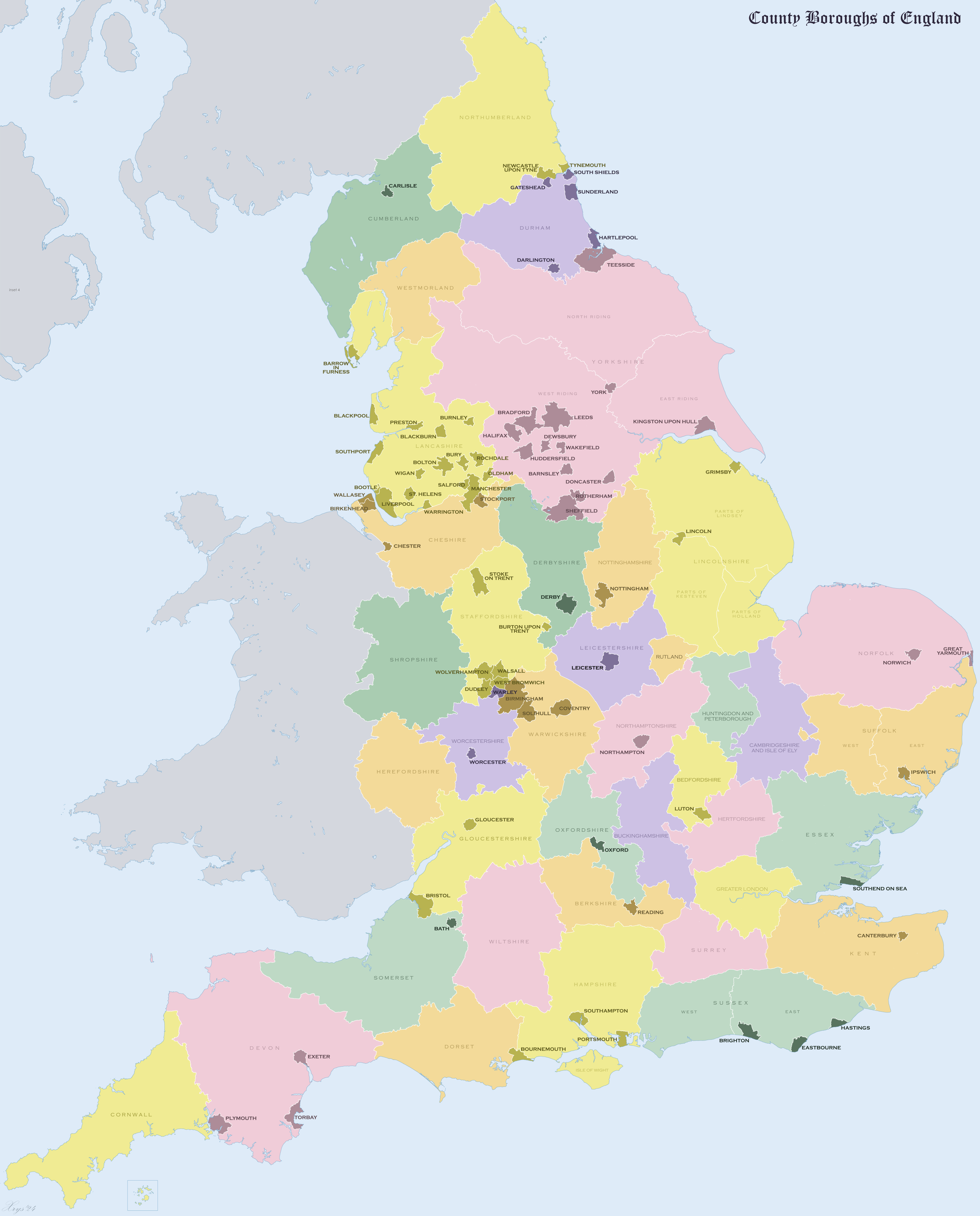

The map depicts the county boroughs in England immediately prior to their abolition in 1974. County boroughs in Wales and Northern Ireland are not shown.

This table shows those county boroughs that existed in England and Wales between the Local Government Acts of 1888 (that created them) and 1972 (that abolished them from 1974).

County borough	From	Associated county	1971 census pop	Successors in 1974	
Barnsley	1913	Yorkshire, West Riding	75,439	Barnsley MB (part)	South Yorkshire
Barrow-in-Furness	1889	Lancashire	64,039	Barrow-in-Furness (part)	Cumbria
Bath	1889	Somerset	84,686	Bath	Avon
Birkenhead	1889	Cheshire	137,889	Wirral MB (part)	Merseyside
Birmingham	1889	Warwickshire	1,014,773	Birmingham MB (part)	West Midlands
Blackburn	1889	Lancashire	101,802	Blackburn (part)	Lancashire
Blackpool	1904	Lancashire	151,871	Blackpool	Lancashire
Bolton	1889	Lancashire	154,223	Bolton MB (part)	Greater Manchester
Bootle	1889	Lancashire	74,304	Sefton MB (part)	Merseyside
Bournemouth	1900	Hampshire	153,861	Bournemouth	Dorset
Bradford	1889	Yorkshire, West Riding	294,164	Bradford MB (part)	West Yorkshire
Brighton	1889	Sussex	161,350	Brighton	East Sussex
Bristol	1889	Gloucestershire (Note: These boroughs were counties corporate and were separate from the associated county for certain largely ceremonial purposes, principally shrievalty and administration of justice.)	426,653	Bristol	Avon
Burnley	1889	Lancashire	76,489	Burnley (part)	Lancashire
Burton upon Trent	1901	Staffordshire	50,211	East Staffordshire (part) (Note: This county borough had charter trustees.)	Staffordshire
Bury	1889	Lancashire	67,870	Bury MB (part)	Greater Manchester
Canterbury	1889	Kent	33,155	Canterbury (part)	Kent
Cardiff	1889	Glamorgan	279,046	Cardiff (part)	South Glamorgan
Carlisle	1915	Cumberland	71,580	Carlisle (part)	Cumbria
Chester	1889	Cheshire	62,923	Chester (part)	Cheshire
Coventry	1889	Warwickshire	335,260	Coventry MB (part)	West Midlands
Darlington	1915	Durham	85,916	Darlington (part)	Durham
Derby	1889	Derbyshire	219,578	Derby	Derbyshire
Dewsbury	1913	Yorkshire, West Riding	51,354	Kirklees MB (part)	West Yorkshire
Doncaster	1927	Yorkshire, West Riding	82,671	Doncaster MB (part)	South Yorkshire
Dudley	1889	Worcestershire to 1966 then Staffordshire	185,592	Dudley MB (part)	West Midlands
Eastbourne	1911	Sussex	70,949	Eastbourne	East Sussex
Exeter	1889	Devon	95,711	Exeter	Devon
Gateshead	1889	Durham	94,464	Gateshead MB (part)	Tyne and Wear
Gloucester	1889	Gloucestershire	90,223	Gloucester	Gloucestershire
Grimsby	1891	Lincolnshire	95,502	Grimsby	Humberside
Halifax	1889	Yorkshire, West Riding	91,263	Calderdale MB (part)	West Yorkshire
Hartlepool	1967	Durham	97,082	Hartlepool (part)	Cleveland
Hastings	1889	Sussex	72,414	Hastings	East Sussex
Huddersfield	1889	Yorkshire, West Riding	131,188	Kirklees MB (part)	West Yorkshire
Ipswich	1889	Suffolk	123,297	Ipswich	Suffolk
Kingston upon Hull	1889	Yorkshire, East Riding	285,965	Kingston upon Hull	Humberside
Leeds	1889	Yorkshire, West Riding	496,036	Leeds MB (part)	West Yorkshire
Leicester	1889	Leicestershire	284,208	Leicester	Leicestershire
Lincoln	1889	Lincolnshire	77,077 (1961)	Lincoln	Lincolnshire
Liverpool	1889	Lancashire	610,114	Liverpool MB	Merseyside
Luton	1964	Bedfordshire	161,400	Luton	Bedfordshire
Manchester	1889	Lancashire	543,741	Manchester MB (part)	Greater Manchester
Merthyr Tydfil	1908	Glamorgan	55,283	Merthyr Tydfil	Mid Glamorgan
Newcastle upon Tyne	1889	Northumberland	222,172	Newcastle upon Tyne MB (part)	Tyne and Wear
Newport	1891	Monmouthshire	112,298	Newport	Gwent
Northampton	1889	Northamptonshire	126,597	Northampton (part)	Northamptonshire
Nottingham	1889	Nottinghamshire	300,675	Nottingham	Nottinghamshire
Norwich	1889	Norfolk	122,093	Norwich	Norfolk
Oldham	1889	Lancashire	105,922	Oldham MB (part)	Greater Manchester
Oxford	1889	Oxfordshire	108,834	Oxford	Oxfordshire
Plymouth	1889	Devon	239,467	Plymouth	Devon
Portsmouth	1889	Hampshire	197,453	Portsmouth	Hampshire
Preston	1889	Lancashire	98,091	Preston (part)	Lancashire
Reading	1889	Berkshire	132,978	Reading	Berkshire
Rochdale	1889	Lancashire	91,461	Rochdale MB (part)	Greater Manchester
Rotherham	1902	Yorkshire, West Riding	84,800	Rotherham MB (part)	South Yorkshire
St Helens	1889	Lancashire	104,326	St Helens MB (part)	Merseyside
Salford	1889	Lancashire	131,006	Salford MB (part)	Greater Manchester
Sheffield	1889	Yorkshire, West Riding	520,308	Sheffield MB (part)	South Yorkshire
Solihull	1964	Warwickshire	107,086	Solihull MB (part)	West Midlands
Southampton	1889	Hampshire	215,131	Southampton	Hampshire
Southend-on-Sea	1914	Essex	162,735	Southend-on-Sea	Essex
Southport	1905	Lancashire	84,524	Sefton MB (part)	Merseyside
South Shields	1889	Durham	100,676	South Tyneside MB (part)	Tyne and Wear
Stockport	1889	Cheshire	139,598	Stockport MB (part)	Greater Manchester
Stoke on Trent	1910	Staffordshire	265,258	Stoke-on-Trent	Staffordshire
Sunderland	1889	Durham	217,075	Sunderland MB (part)	Tyne and Wear
Swansea	1889	Glamorgan	173,355	Swansea (part)	West Glamorgan
Teesside	1968	Yorkshire, North Riding	396,233	Middlesbrough (part); Stockton (part); Langbaurgh (part)	Cleveland
Torbay	1968	Devon	109,260	Torbay	Devon
Tynemouth	1904	Northumberland	69,339	North Tyneside MB (part)	Tyne and Wear
Wakefield	1915	Yorkshire, West Riding	59,591	Wakefield MB (part)	West Yorkshire
Wallasey	1913	Cheshire	97,216	Wirral MB (part)	Merseyside
Walsall	1889	Staffordshire	184,734	Walsall MB (part)	West Midlands
Warley	1966	Worcestershire	163,567	Sandwell MB (part)	West Midlands
Warrington	1900	Lancashire	68,322	Warrington (part)	Cheshire
West Bromwich	1889	Staffordshire	166,592	Sandwell MB (part)	West Midlands
Wigan	1889	Lancashire	81,144	Wigan MB (part)	Greater Manchester
Wolverhampton	1889	Staffordshire	269,112	Wolverhampton MB	West Midlands
Worcester	1889	Worcestershire	73,454	Worcester (part)	Hereford and Worcester
Yarmouth	1889	Norfolk	50,236	Great Yarmouth (part)	Norfolk
York	1889	Yorkshire, West Riding	104,783	York	North Yorkshire

Only four districts with more than one county borough were formed: Wirral, Sandwell, Sefton and Kirklees. Elsewhere, county boroughs usually formed the core or all of a district named after the county borough – with the exceptions of Halifax, whose metropolitan district was named Calderdale, Burton upon Trent, which became part of the East Staffordshire district, and Teesside, which was split up between three non-metropolitan districts.

=== Previous county boroughs ===
County boroughs to be abolished prior to 1974 were:

County borough	County	Created	Abolished	Successor
Croydon	Surrey	1889	1965	Greater London: London Borough of Croydon
Devonport	Devon	1889	1914	County Borough of Plymouth
East Ham	Essex	1915	1965	Greater London: London Borough of Newham
Hanley	Staffordshire	1889	1910	County Borough of Stoke on Trent
Middlesbrough	Yorkshire, North Riding	1889	1968	County Borough of Teesside
Smethwick	Staffordshire	1907	1966	County Borough of Warley
West Ham	Essex	1889	1965	Greater London: London Borough of Newham
West Hartlepool	Durham	1902	1967	County Borough of Hartlepool

== Northern Ireland ==
The county boroughs of Belfast and Derry were created by the Local Government (Ireland) Act 1898.

In Northern Ireland, local government has not used county boroughs since 1973, but they remain in use for lieutenancy.

For administrative purposes the two county boroughs in Northern Ireland were replaced with two larger districts (Belfast and Londonderry).

== Republic of Ireland ==
The Local Government (Ireland) Act 1898 created county boroughs in Ireland. Under the Act, four former counties corporate (Cork, Dublin, Limerick and Waterford) became county boroughs.

Galway became a county borough in 1986.

In the Republic of Ireland, the relevant legislation remained in force (although amended), and county boroughs on the original model existed until 2001. Under the Local Government Act 2001 (which replaced most existing local government legislation in Ireland), the term "County Borough" was abolished and replaced with "City" (and hence, "Corporation" with "City Council"). However Kilkenny, while a traditional city, was never a county borough. Under the Local Government Reform Act 2014, the borough of Kilkenny was abolished, but the municipal district containing the administrative area of the former borough of Kilkenny would be known as the Municipal District of Kilkenny City.

== See also ==
- County corporate
- List of administrative counties and county boroughs of England by population in 1971
- London boroughs
- Metropolitan borough
- Municipal borough
