= Joseph Lister =

English scientist, surgeon and antiseptic pioneer (1827–1912)

The Right Honourable The Lord Lister OM PC FRS FRCSE FRCPGlas FRCS
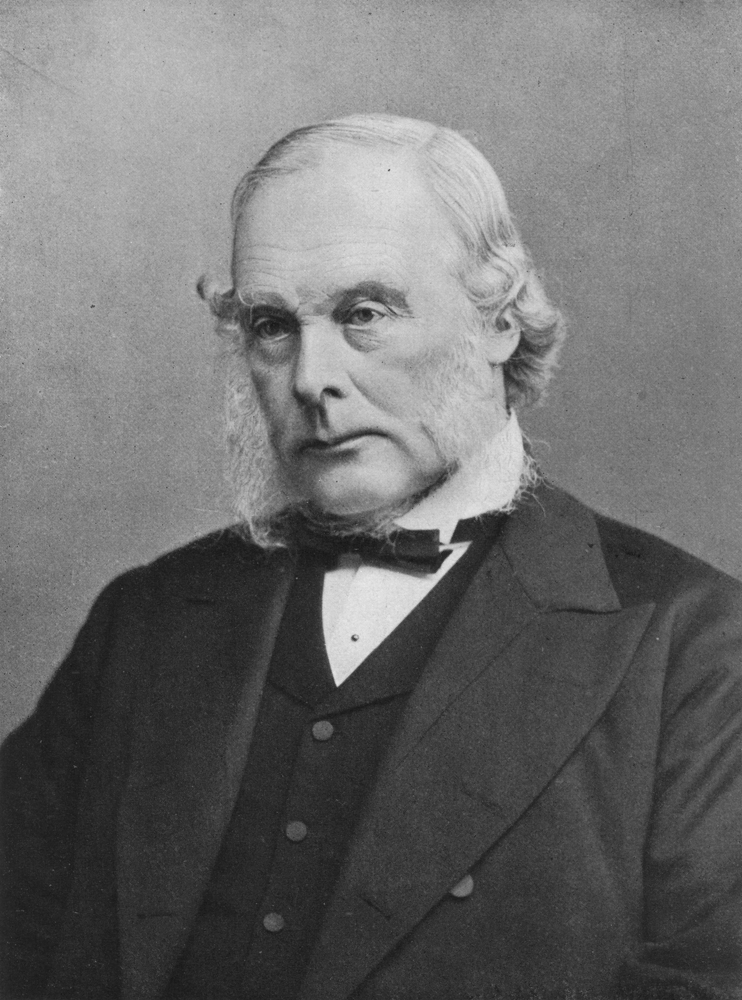
- Lister in 1902

37th President of the Royal Society
- In office 1895–1900
- Preceded by: The Lord Kelvin
- Succeeded by: Sir William Huggins

Personal details
- Born: 5 April 1827 Upton House, West Ham, England
- Died: 10 February 1912 (aged 84) Walmer, Kent, England
- Resting place: Hampstead Cemetery, London
- Spouse: Agnes Syme (m. 1856; died 1893)
- Parents: Joseph Jackson Lister (1786–1869); Isabella Harris; (1792–1864)
- Scientific career
- Education: University College London
- Known for: Surgical sterile techniques
- Awards: Royal Medal (1880); Cameron Prize for Therapeutics of the University of Edinburgh (1890); Albert Medal (1894); Copley Medal (1902)
- Fields: Medicine
- Workplaces: University of Edinburgh; University of Glasgow; King's College London

Joseph Lister, 1st Baron Lister (5 April 1827 – 10 February 1912) was an English surgeon, medical scientist, experimental pathologist and pioneer of antiseptic surgery and preventive healthcare. Lister revolutionised the craft of surgery by the use of close anatomical observation, in the same manner that John Hunter revolutionised the science of surgery.

From a technical viewpoint, Lister was not an exceptional surgeon, but his research into bacteriology and infection in wounds revolutionised surgery throughout the world.

Lister's contributions were four-fold. Firstly, as a surgeon at the Glasgow Royal Infirmary, he introduced carbolic acid (modern-day phenol) as a steriliser for surgical instruments, patients' skins, sutures, surgeons' hands, and wards, promoting the principle of antiseptics. Secondly, he researched the role of inflammation and tissue perfusion in the healing of wounds. Thirdly, he advanced diagnostic science by analysing specimens using microscopes. Fourthly, he devised strategies to increase the chances of survival after surgery. His most important contribution, however, was recognising that putrefaction in wounds is caused by germs, in connection to Louis Pasteur's then-novel germ theory of fermentation. (Note: Fermentation was the word Lister used for the putrefactive process of sepsis that we might now describe as wound infection)

Lister's work led to a reduction in post-operative infections and made surgery safer for patients, leading to him being distinguished as the "father of modern surgery".

== Early life ==
Lister was born to a prosperous, educated Quaker family in the village of Upton, then near but now in London, England. He was the fourth child and second son of four sons and three daughters born to gentleman scientist and wine merchant Joseph Jackson Lister and school assistant Isabella Lister née Harris. The couple married in a ceremony held in Ackworth, West Riding of Yorkshire, on 14 July 1818.

Lister's paternal great-great-grandfather, Thomas Lister, was the last of several generations of farmers who lived in Bingley, West Riding of Yorkshire. Lister joined the Society of Friends as a young man and passed his beliefs on to his son, Joseph Lister. He moved to London in 1720 to open a tobacconist's shop in Aldersgate Street in the City of London. His son, John Lister, was born there. Lister's grandfather was apprenticed to watchmaker Isaac Rogers, in 1752 and followed that trade on his own account in Bell Alley, Lombard Street from 1759 to 1766. He then took over his father's tobacco business, but gave it up in 1769 in favour of working at his father-in-law Stephen Jackson's business as a wine-merchant at No 28 Old Wine and Brandy Values on Lothbury Street, opposite Tokenhouse Yard.

His father was a pioneer in the design of achromatic object lenses for use in compound microscopes He spent 30 years perfecting the microscope, and in the process, discovered the Law of Aplanatic Foci, building a microscope where the image point of one lens coincided with the focal point of another. Up until that time, the best higher magnification lenses produced an excessive secondary aberration known as a coma, which interfered with normal use. It was considered a major advance that elevated histology into an independent science. By 1832, Lister's work had built a reputation sufficient to enable his being elected to the Royal Society. His mother, Isabella, was the youngest daughter of master mariner Anthony Harris. Isabella worked at the Ackworth School, a Quaker school for the poor, assisting her widowed mother, the superintendent of the school.

Parents

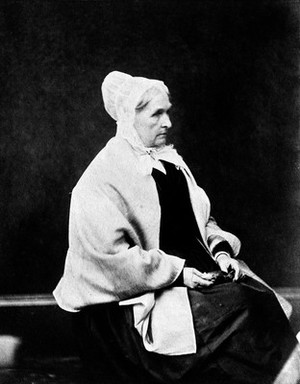
Isabella Harris c. 1839

Joseph Jackson Lister

The eldest daughter of the couple was Mary Lister. On 21 August 1851, she married the barrister Rickman Godlee of Lincoln's Inn and the Middle Temple, who belonged to the Friends meeting house in Plaistow. The couple had six children. Their second child was Rickman Godlee, a neurosurgeon who became Professor of Clinical Surgery at the University College Hospital and surgeon to Queen Victoria. He became Lister's biographer in 1917. The eldest son of Joseph and Isabella Lister was John Lister, who died of a painful brain tumour. With John's death, Joseph became the heir of the family. The couple's second daughter was Isabella Sophia Lister, who married Irish Quaker Thomas Pim in 1848. Lister's other brother William Henry Lister died after a long illness. The youngest son was Arthur Lister, a wine merchant, botanist and lifelong Quaker, who studied Mycetozoa. He worked alongside his daughter Gulielma Lister to produce the standard monograph on Mycetozoa. By 1898, Lister's work had built a reputation sufficient to enable his election to the Royal Society. Gulielma Lister, a talented artist, later updated the standard monograph with colour drawings. Her work built a reputation sufficient to be elected a fellow of the Linnean Society in 1904. She became its vice-president in 1929. The couple's last child was Jane Lister; she married widower Smith Harrison, a wholesale tea merchant.

After their marriage, the Listers lived at 5 Tokenhouse Yard in Central London for three years until 1822, where they ran a port wine business in partnership with Thomas Barton Beck. Beck was the grandfather of the professor of surgery and proponent of the germ theory of disease, Marcus Beck, who would later promote Lister's discoveries in his fight to introduce antiseptics. In 1822, Lister's family moved to Stoke Newington. In 1826, the family moved to Upton House, a long low Queen Anne style mansion that came with 69 acres of land. It had been rebuilt in 1731, to suit the style of the period.

Early homes

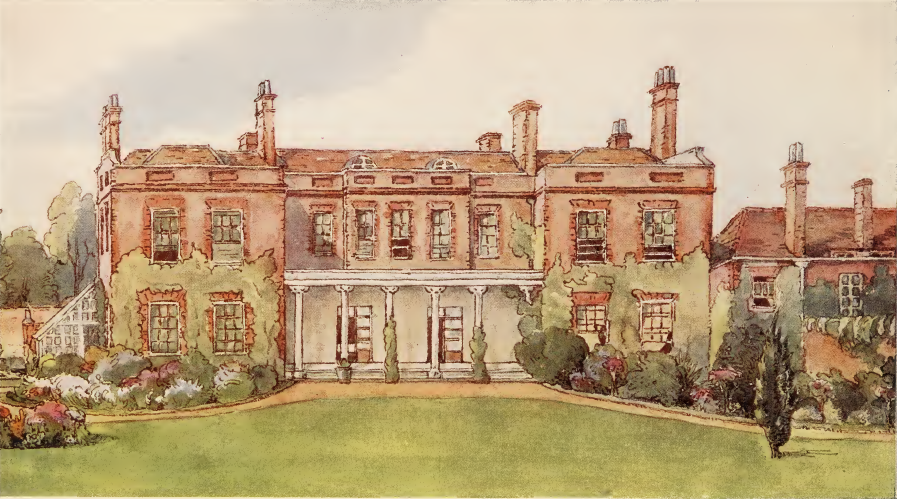
Upton House. The watercolour was created by his older sister, Mary Joseph.

== Education ==
=== School ===
As a child, Lister had a stammer and this was possibly why he was educated at home until he was 11 years old. Lister then attended Isaac Brown and Benjamin Abbott's Academy, a private Quaker school in Hitchin, Hertfordshire. When Lister was 13, he attended Grove House School in Tottenham, also a private Quaker School to study mathematics, natural science, and languages. His father was insistent that Lister received a good grounding in French and German, in the knowledge he would learn Latin at school. From an early age, Lister was strongly encouraged by his father and would talk about his father's great influence later in life, particularly in encouraging him in his study of natural history. Lister's interest in natural history led him to study bones and to collect and dissect small animals and fish that were examined using his father's microscope and then drawn using the camera lucida technique that his father had explained to him, or sketched. His father's interests in microscopical research developed in Lister the determination to become a surgeon and prepared him for a life of scientific research. None of Lister's relatives were in the medical profession. According to Godlee, the decision to become a physician seemed to be an entirely spontaneous decision.

In 1843, his father decided to send him to university. As Lister was unable to attend either University of Oxford or the University of Cambridge owing to the religious tests that effectively barred him, he decided to apply to the non-sectarian University College London Medical School (UCL), one of only a few institutions in Great Britain that accepted Quakers at that time. Lister took the public examination in the junior class of botany, a required course that would enable him to matriculate. Lister left school in the spring of 1844, when he was 17 years old.

Schools that Lister attended

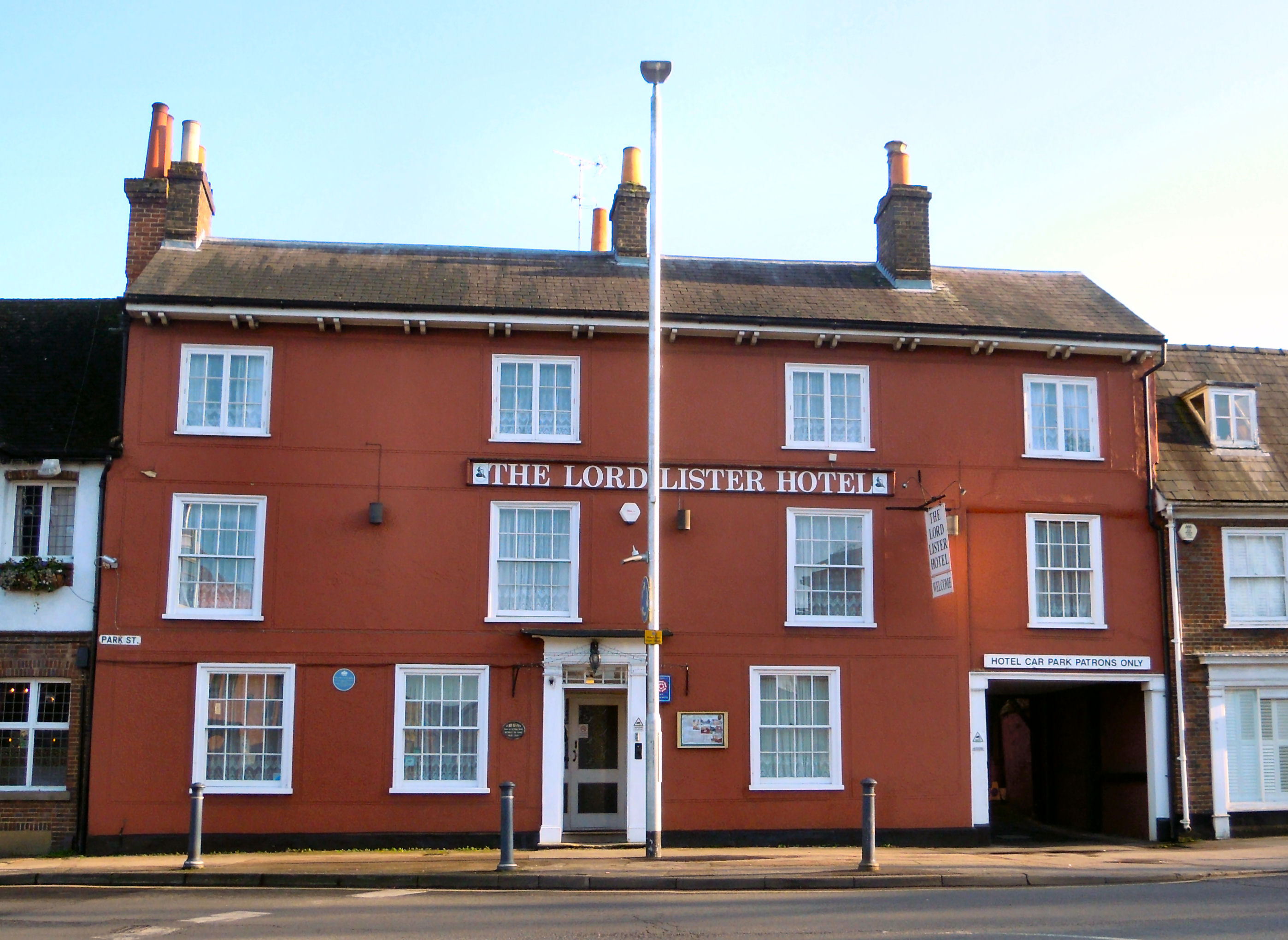
The Lord Lister Hotel in Hitchin, formerly Isaac Brown and Benjamin Abbott's Academy, where Lister was a student from 1838 to 1841

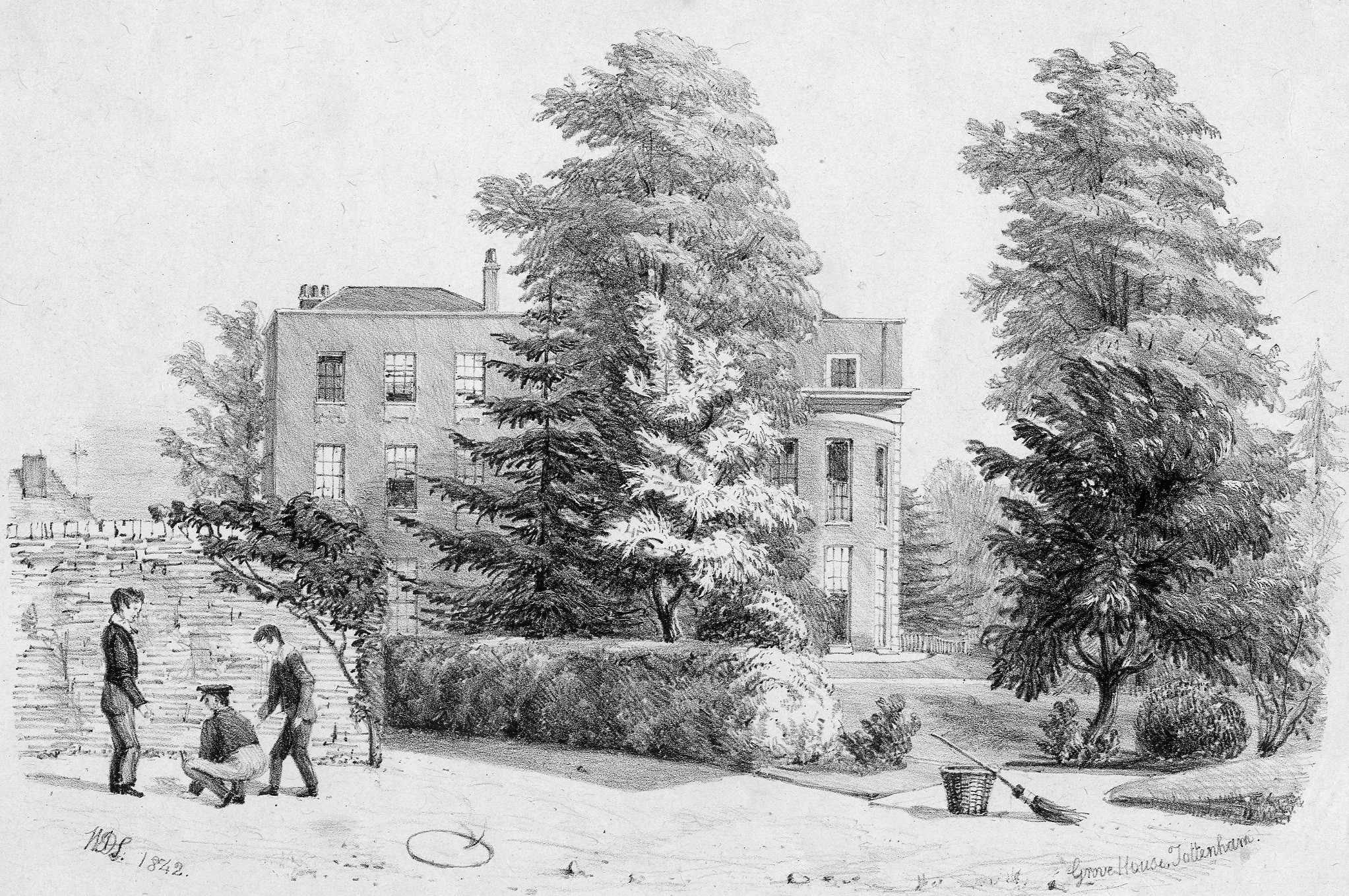
Grove House, a private Quaker school in Tottenham. A lithograph by W.D. Sparkes in 1842.

=== University ===
In 1844, just before his 17th birthday, Lister moved to an apartment at 28 London Road that he shared with Edward Palmer, also a Quaker. Between 1844 and 1845, Lister continued his pre-matriculation studies, in Greek, Latin and natural philosophy. In the Latin and Greek classes, he won a "Certificate of Honour". For the experimental natural philosophy class, Lister won first prize and was awarded a copy of Charles Hutton's "Recreations in Mathematics and Natural Philosophy".

Although his father wanted him to continue his general education, the university had demanded since 1837, that each student obtain a Bachelor of Arts (BA) degree before commencing medical training. Lister matriculated in August 1845, initially studying for a BA in classics. Between 1845 and 1846, Lister studied the mathematics of natural philosophy, mathematics and Greek earning a "Certificate of Honour" in each class. Between 1846 and 1847, Lister studied both anatomy and atomic theory (chemistry) and won a prize for his essay. On 21 December 1846, Lister and Palmer attended Robert Liston's famous operation where ether was applied by Lister's classmate, William Squire to anaesthetise a patient for the first time. On 23 December 1847, Lister and Palmer moved to 2 Bedford Place and were joined by John Hodgkin, the nephew of Thomas Hodgkin who discovered Hodgkin lymphoma. Lister and Hodgkin had been school friends.

In December 1847, Lister graduated with a degree of Bachelor of Arts 1st division, with a distinction in classics and botany. While he was studying, Lister suffered from a mild bout of smallpox, a year after his elder brother died of the disease. The bereavement combined with the stress of his classes led to a nervous breakdown in March 1848. Lister's nephew Godlee used the term to describe the situation and is perhaps indicative that adolescence was just as difficult in 1847, as it is now. Lister decided to take a long holiday to recuperate and this delayed the start of his studies. In late April 1848, Lister visited the Isle of Man with Hodgkin and by 7 June 1848, he was visiting Ilfracombe. At the end of June, Lister accepted an invitation to stay in the home of Thoman Pim, a Dublin Quaker. Using it as his base, Lister travelled throughout Ireland. On 1 July 1848, Lister received a letter full of warmth and love from his father where his last meeting was "...sunshine after a refreshing shower, following a time of cloud" and advised him to "cherish a pious cheerful spirit, open to see and to enjoy the bounties and the beauties spread around us :—not to give way to turning thy thoughts upon thyself nor even at present to dwell long on serious things". From 22 July 1848, for more than a year, the record is blank.

=== Medical student ===
Lister registered as a medical student in the winter of 1849 and became active in the University Debating Society and the Hospital Medical Society. In the autumn of 1849, he returned to college with a microscope given to him by his father. After completing courses in anatomy, physiology and surgery, he was awarded a "Certificate of Honours", winning the silver medal in anatomy and physiology and a gold medal in botany.

His main lecturers were John Lindley professor of botany, Thomas Graham professor of chemistry, Robert Edmond Grant professor of comparative anatomy, George Viner Ellis professor of anatomy and William Benjamin Carpenter professor of medical jurisprudence. Lister often spoke highly of Lindley and Graham in his writings, but Wharton Jones professor of ophthalmic medicine and surgery, and William Sharpey professor of physiology, exercised the greatest influence on him. He was greatly attracted by Dr. Sharpey's lectures, which inspired in him a love of experimental physiology and histology that never left him.

Thomas Henry Huxley praised Wharton Jones for the method and quality of his physiology lectures. As a clinical scientist working in physiological sciences, he was foremost in the number of discoveries he made. He was also considered a brilliant ophthalmic surgeon, his main field. He conducted research into the circulation of blood and the phenomena of inflammation, carried out on the frog's web (Note: The webbed feet of the hind leg of a chloroformed frog.) and the bat's wing, and no doubt suggested this method of research to Lister. Sharpey was called the father of modern physiology as he was the first to give a series of lectures on the subject. Prior to that the field had been considered part of anatomy. Sharpey studied at Edinburgh University, then went to Paris to study clinical surgery under French anatomist Guillaume Dupuytren and operative surgery under Jacques Lisfranc de St. Martin. Sharpey met James Syme while in Paris and the two became life-long friends. After he moved to Edinburgh he taught anatomy with Allen Thomson as his physiological colleague. He left Edinburgh in 1836, to become the first Professor of Physiology.

Lister's university and his lecturers

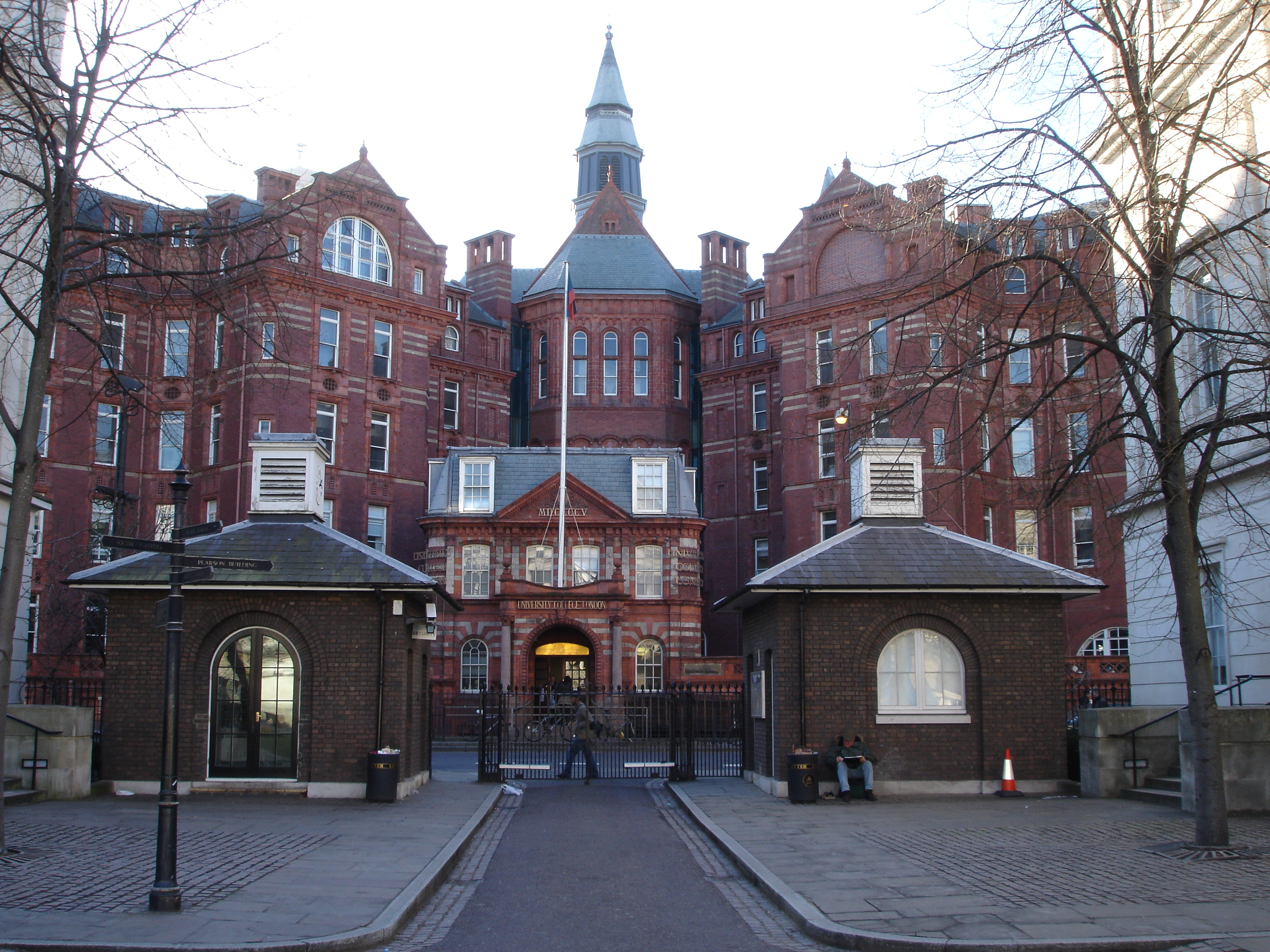
Gower street entrance to the university

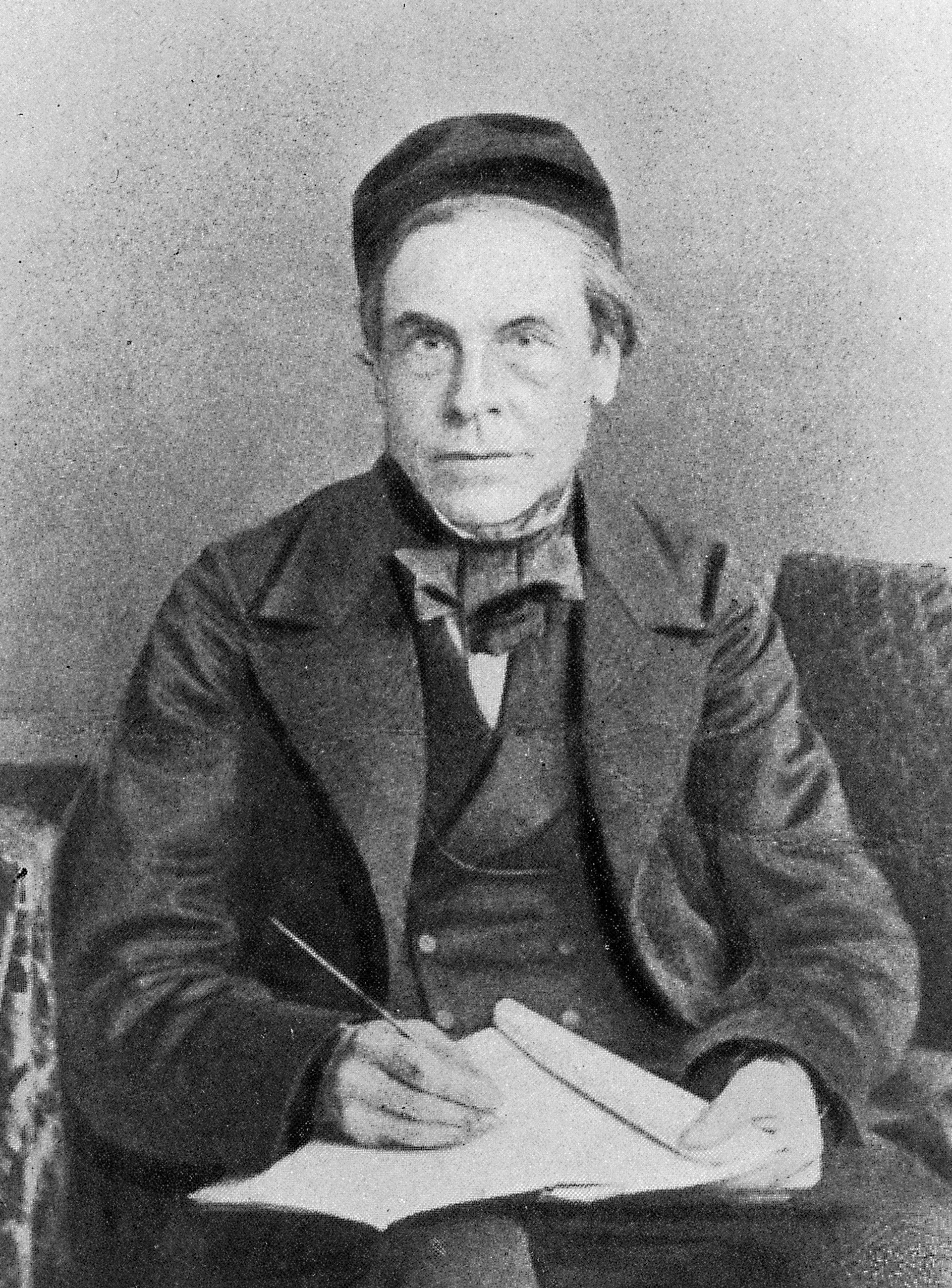
Wharton Jones

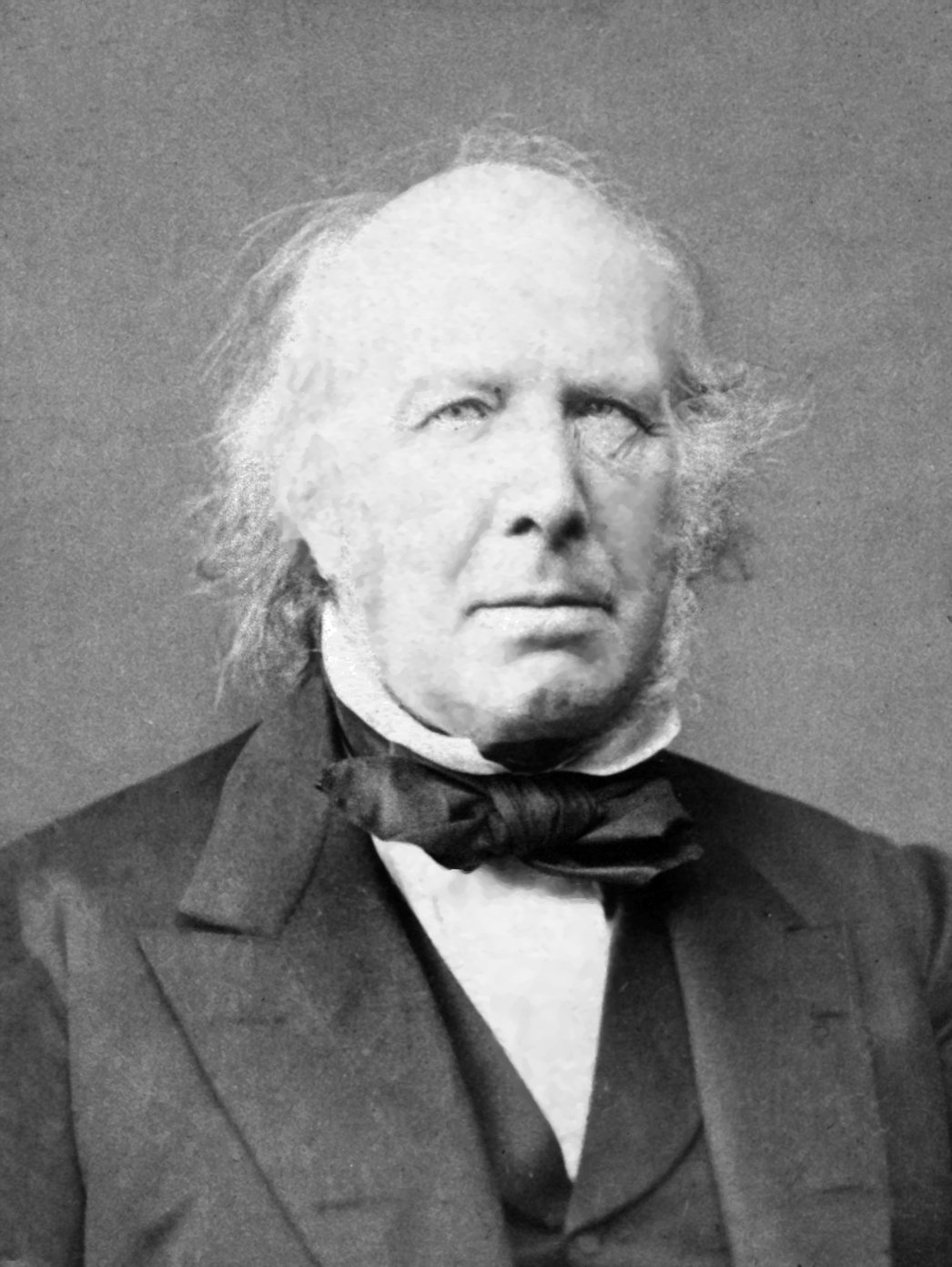
William Sharpey

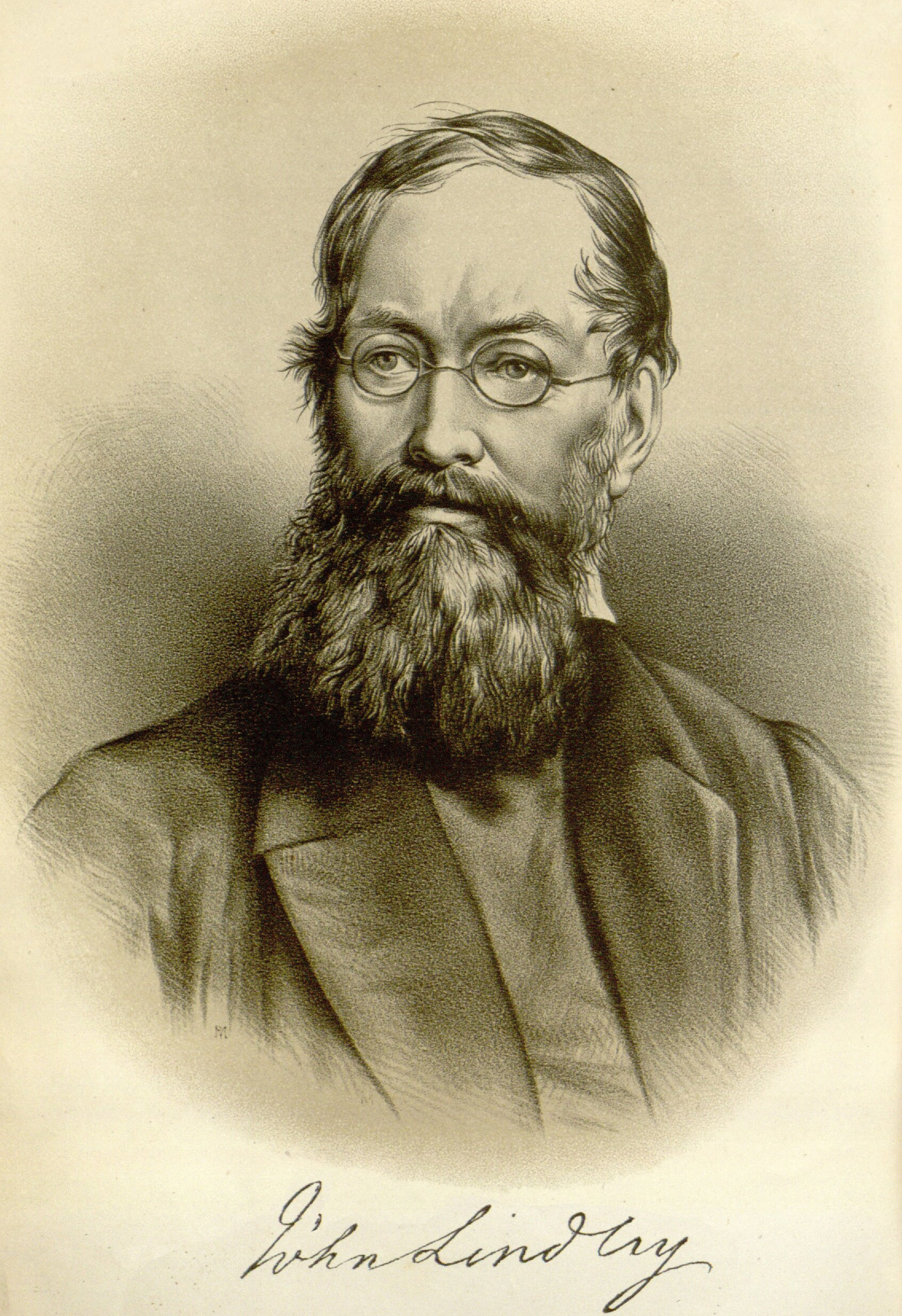
John Lindley

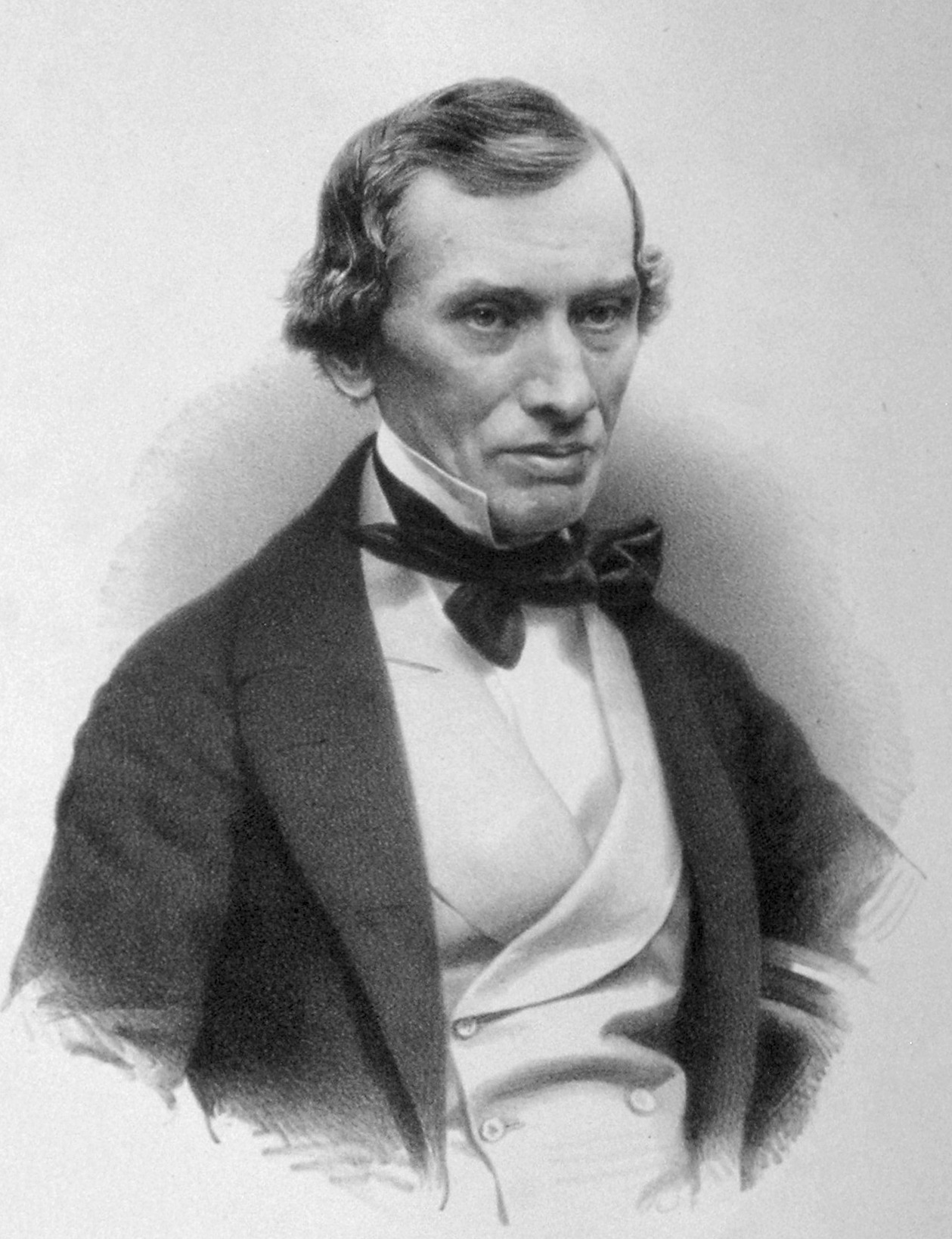
Thomas Graham

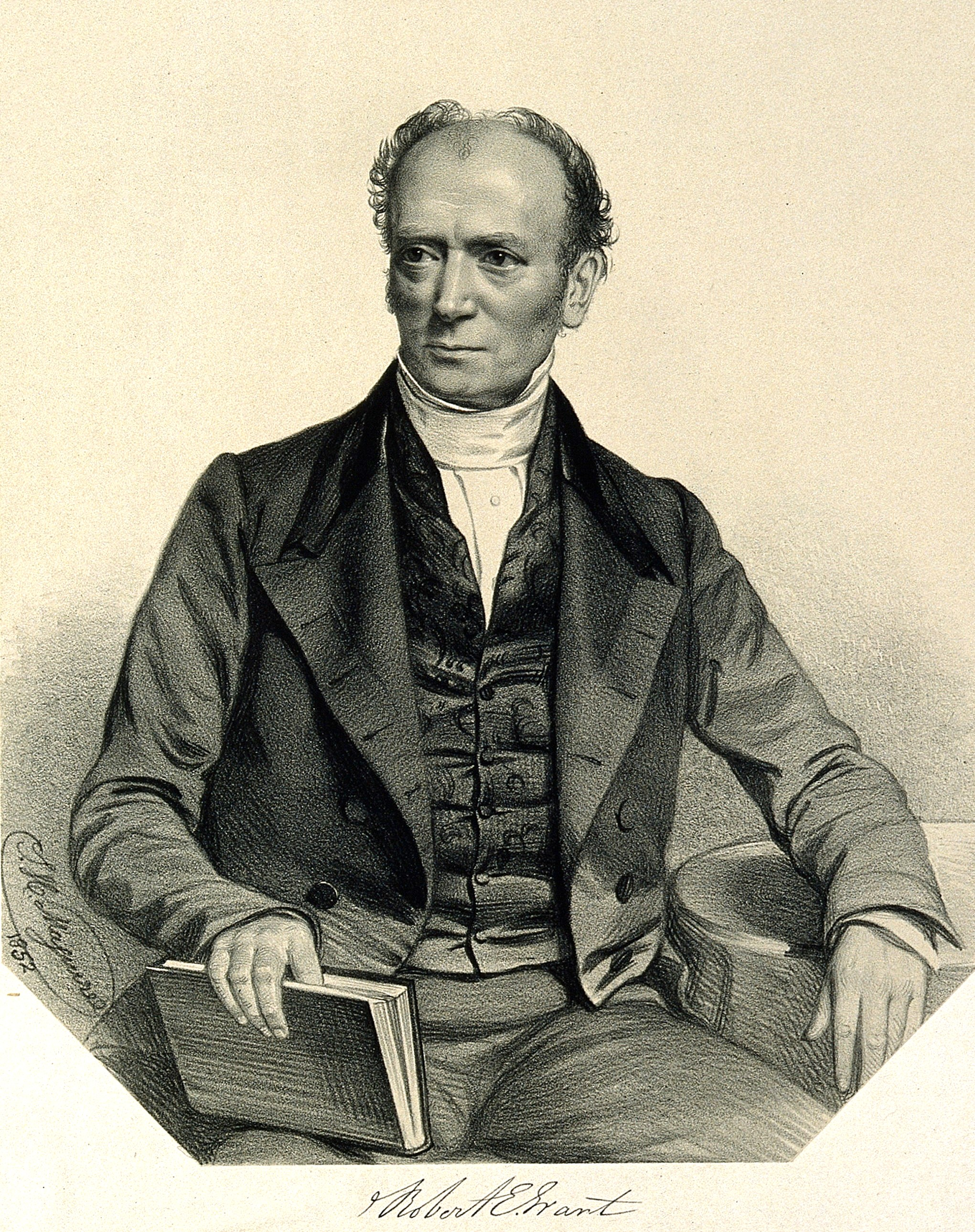
Robert Grant

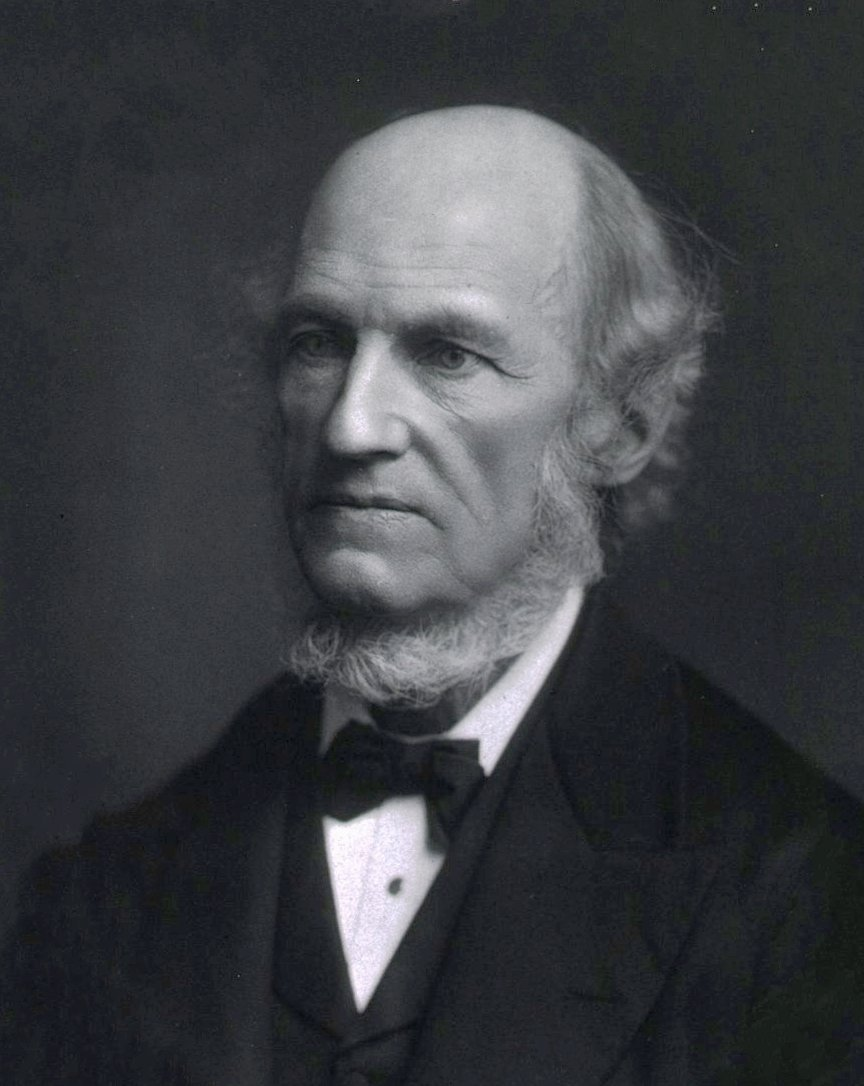
William Carpenter

==== Clinical instruction ====
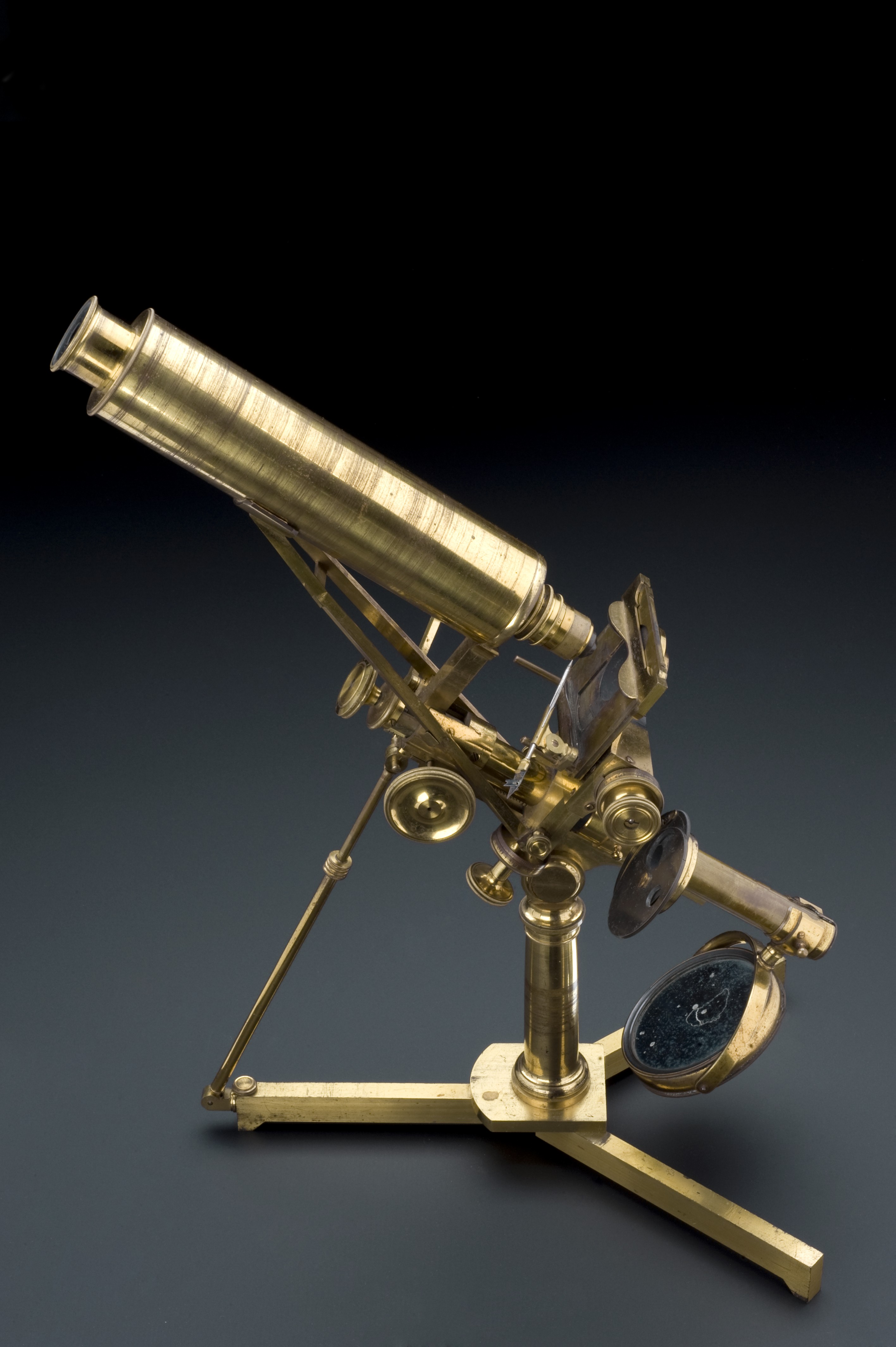
The microscope given to Lister in 1849 by his father J.J. Lister who designed it. This is the third in a set of three built by James Smith. It is an Achromatic microscope with a compound automatic objective and graduated automatic objective.

To qualify for his degree, Lister had to complete two years of clinical instruction, and began his residency at University College Hospital in October 1850. as an intern and then house physician to Walter Hayle Walshe, professor of pathological anatomy and author of the 1846 study, The Nature and Treatment of Cancer. Lister in 1850 again received "Certificates of Honours" and won two gold medals in anatomy and a silver medal each in surgery and medicine.

In his second year in 1851, Lister became first a dresser in January 1851 then a house surgeon to John Eric Erichsen in May 1851. Erichsen was professor of surgery and author of the 1853 Science and Art of Surgery, described as one of the most celebrated English-language textbooks on surgery. The book went through many editions; Marcus Beck edited the eighth and ninth, adding Lister's antiseptic techniques and Pasteur and Robert Koch's germ theory.

Lister's first case notes were recorded on 5 February 1851. As a dresser, his immediate superior was Henry Thompson, who recalled "..a shy Quaker...I remember that he had a better microscope than any man in the college".

Lister had only just begun working in his role as dresser to Erichsen in January 1851, when an epidemic of erysipelas broke out in the male ward. An infected patient from an Islington workhouse was left in Erichsen's surgical ward for two hours. The hospital had been free of infection but within days there were twelve cases of infection and four deaths. In his notebook, Lister stated that the disease was a form of surgical fever, and particularly noted that recent surgical patients were infected the worst, but that those with older surgeries with suppurating wounds, 'mostly escaped'. It was while Lister worked for Erichsen, that his interest in the healing of wounds began. Erichsen was a miasmatist who thought the wounds became infected from miasmas from the wound itself that caused a noxious form of "bad air" that spread to other patients in the ward. Erichsen believed that seven patients with an infected wound had saturated of the ward with "bad air", which spread to cause gangrene. However, Lister saw that some wounds, when debrided and cleaned, would sometimes heal. He believed that something in the wound itself was at fault.

When he became a house surgeon, Lister had patients put in his charge. For the first time, he came into contact face-to-face with various forms of blood-poisoning diseases like pyaemia and hospital gangrene, which rots living tissue with a remarkable rapidity. While examining in an autopsy an excision of the elbow of a little boy who had died of pyaemia, Lister noticed that a thick yellow-pus was present at the seat of the humerus bone, and distended the brachial and axillary veins. He also noticed that the pus advanced in the reverse direction along the veins, bypassing the valves in the veins. He also found suppuration in a knee-joint and multiple abscesses in the lungs. Lister knew that Charles-Emmanuel Sédillot had discovered that multiple abscesses in the lungs were caused by introducing pus into the veins of an animal. At the time he could not explain the facts but believed the pus in the organs had a metastatic origin. On 2 October 1900, during The Huxley Lecture, Lister described how his interest in the germ theory of disease and how it applied to surgery began with his investigation into the death of that little boy.

There was an epidemic of gangrene during his surgeoncy. The treatment method was to chloroform the patient, scrape the soft slough off and burn the necrotic flesh away with mercury pernitrate Occasionally the treatment would succeed, but when a grey film appeared at the edges of the wound, it presaged death. In one patient, the repeated treatment failed several times, so Erichsen amputated the limb, which healed fine. Lister recognised that the disease was a "local poison" and probably parasitic in nature. He examined the diseased tissues under his microscope. He saw peculiar objects that he could not identify, as he had no frame of reference to draw conclusions from these observations. In his notebook he recorded:

I imagined they might be the materies morbi in the form of some kind of fungus. (Note: Materies morbi, meaning morbid material is an obsolete medical term that describes a material substance that acts as the immediate cause of a disease)

Lister wrote two papers on the epidemics; but both were lost: Hospital gangrene and Microscope. They were read to the Student Medical Society at UCL.

==== Lister's first operation ====
On 26 June 2013, medical historian Ruth Richardson and orthopaedic surgeon Bryan Rhodes published a paper in which they described their discovery of Lister's first operation, made while both were researching his career. At 1 pm on 27 June 1851, Lister, a second-year medical student working at a casualty ward in Gower Street, conducted his first operation. Julia Sullivan, a mother of eight grown children, had been stabbed in the abdomen by her husband, a drunk and ne'er-do-well, who was taken into custody. On 15 September 1851, Lister was called as a witness to the husband's trial at the Old Bailey. His testimony helped convict the husband, who was transported to Australia for 20 years.

About a yard of small intestine about eight inches across, damaged in two places, protruded from the woman's lower abdomen, which had three open wounds. After cleaning the intestines with blood-warm water, Lister was unable to place them back into the body, so he decided to extend the cut. He then placed the intestines back into the abdomen, and sewed and sutured the wounds shut. He administered opium to induce constipation and enable the intestines to recover. Sullivan recovered her health. This was a full decade before his first public operation in the Glasgow Infirmary.

This operation was missed by historians. Liverpool consultant surgeon John Shepherd, in his essay on Lister, Joseph Lister and abdominal surgery, written in 1968, failed to mention the operation, and instead started his account from the 1860s onwards. He apparently was unaware of this surgery.

==== Microscope experiments 1852 ====
===== Contractile Tissue of the Iris =====
Lister's first paper "Observations on the Contractile Tissue of the Iris" was written while he was still at university and published in the Quarterly Journal of Microscopical Science in 1853.

On 11 August 1852, Lister attended an operation at University College Hospital by Wharton Jones, who presented him with a fresh slice of human iris. Lister took the opportunity to study the iris. He reviewed existing research and studied tissue from a horse, a cat, a rabbit and a guinea pig as well as six surgical specimens from patients who had undergone eye surgery. Lister was unable to complete his research to his satisfaction, due to his need to pass his final examination. He offered an apology in the paper:

My engagements do not allow me to carry the inquiry further at present; and my apology for offering the results of an incomplete investigation is that a contribution tending, in however small a degree, to extend our acquaintance with so important an organ as the eye, or to verify observations that may be thought doubtful, may probably be of interest to the physiologist.

The paper advanced the work of Swiss physiologist Albert von Kölliker, demonstrating the existence of two distinct muscles, the dilator and sphincter in the iris. This corrected the convictions of previous researchers that there was no dilator pupillae muscle.

===== Muscular Tissue of the Skin =====
His next paper "Observations on the Muscular Tissue of the Skin" was an investigation into goose bumps, that was published on 1 June 1853 in the same journal. Lister was able to confirm Kölliker's experimental finding that in humans the smooth muscle fibres are responsible for making hair stand out from the skin, in contrast to other mammals, whose large tactile hairs are associated with striated muscle. Lister also demonstrated a new method of creating histological sections from the tissue of the scalp.

Lister's microscopy skills were so advanced that he was able to correct the observations of German histologist Friedrich Gustav Henle, who mistook small blood vessels for muscle fibres. In each of the papers, he created camera lucida drawings so accurate that they could be used to scale and measure the observations.

Both papers attracted significant attention in Britain and abroad. Naturalist Richard Owen, an old friend of Lister's father, was particularly impressed by them. Owen contemplated recruiting Lister for his department and forwarded him a thank-you letter on 2 August 1853. Kölliker was particularly pleased with the analysis that Lister had formulated. Kölliker made many trips to Britain, and eventually met Lister. They became life-long friends. Their close friendship was described in a letter by Kölliker on 17 November 1897, that Rickman Godlee chose to use to illustrate their relationship. Kölliker sent a letter to Lister when he was president of the Royal Society, congratulating him on receiving the Copley medal, fondly remembering old friends who had died, and celebrating his time in Scotland with Syme and Lister. Kölliker was 80 years old at the time.

=== Graduation ===
Lister graduated with a Bachelor of Medicine with honours in the autumn of 1852. During his final year, Lister won several prestigious awards heavily contested among the student body of London teaching hospitals. He won the Longridge Prize

For the greatest proficiency evinced during the three years immediately preceding, on the Sessional Examinations for Honours in the classes of the Faculty of Medicine of the College; and for creditable performance of duties of offices at the Hospital

that included a £40 stipend. He was also awarded a gold medal in structural and physiological botany. Lister won two of the four available gold medals in anatomy and physiology as well as surgery, which came with a scholarship of £50 a year for two years, for his second examination in medicine. In the same year, Lister passed the examination for the fellowship of the Royal College of Surgeons, bringing to a close nine years of education.

Sharpey advised Lister to spend a month at the medical practice of his lifelong friend James Syme in Edinburgh and then visit medical schools in Europe for a longer period for training. Sharpey himself had been taught first in Edinburgh and later in Paris. Sharpey had met Syme, a teacher of clinical surgery widely considered the best surgeon in the United Kingdom while he was in Paris. Sharpey had gone to Edinburgh in 1818, along with many other surgeons since, due to the influence of John Hunter. Hunter had taught Edward Jenner, seen as the first surgeon to take a scientific approach to the study of medicine, known as the Hunterian method Hunter was an early advocate for careful investigation and experimentation, using the techniques of pathology and physiology to give himself a better understanding of healing than many of his colleagues. For example, his 1794 paper, A treatise on the blood, inflammation and gun-shot wounds was the first systematic study of swelling, discovering that inflammation was common to all diseases. Due to Hunter, surgery, then practised by hobbyists or amateurs, became a true scientific profession. As the Scottish universities taught medicine and surgery from a scientific viewpoint, surgeons who wished to emulate those techniques travelled there for training. Scottish universities had several other features that distinguished them from those in the south. They were inexpensive and did not require religious admissions tests, and thus attracted the most scientifically progressive students in Britain. The most important differentiator was that medical schools in Scotland had evolved from a scholarly tradition, where English medical schools relied on hospitals and practice. Experimental science had no practitioners at English medical schools and while Edinburgh University medical school was large and active at the time, southern medical schools were generally moribund, and their laboratory space and teaching materials inadequate. English medical schools also tended to view surgery as manual labour, not a respectable calling for a gentleman academic.

== Surgical profession 1854 ==
Before Lister's studies of surgery, many people believed that chemical damage from exposure to "bad air", or miasma, was responsible for infections in wounds. Hospital wards were occasionally aired out at midday as a precaution against the spread of infection via miasma, but facilities for washing hands or a patient's wounds were not available. A surgeon was not required to wash his hands before seeing a patient; in the absence of any theory of bacterial infection, such practices were not considered necessary. Despite the work of Ignaz Semmelweis and Oliver Wendell Holmes Sr., hospitals practised surgery under unsanitary conditions. Surgeons of the time referred to the "good old surgical stink" and took pride in the stains on their unwashed operating gowns as a display of their experience.

== Edinburgh 1853–1860 ==
=== James Syme ===
Syme, a well-established clinical lecturer at Edinburgh University for more than two decades before he met Lister, was considered the boldest and most original surgeon then living in Great Britain. He became a surgical pioneer during his career, preferring simpler surgical procedures, as he detested complexity, in the era that immediately preceded the introduction of anaesthesia.

In September 1823, at the age of 24, Syme made a name for himself by first performing an amputation at the hip-joint, the first in Scotland. Considered the bloodiest operation in surgery, Syme completed it in less than a minute, as speed was essential at that time, before anaesthesia. Syme became widely known and acclaimed for developing a surgical operation that became known as Syme amputation, an amputation at the ankle where the foot is removed and the heel pad is preserved. Syme was considered a scientific surgeon, as evidenced by his paper On the Power of the Periosteum to form New Bone, and became one of the first advocates of antiseptics.

=== Arrival in Edinburgh ===
In September 1853, Lister arrived in Edinburgh bearing letters of introduction from Sharpey to Syme. Lister was anxious about his first appointment but decided to settle in Edinburgh after meeting Syme, who embraced him with open arms, invited him to dinner, and offered him an opportunity to assist him in his private operations.

Lister was invited to Syme's house Millbank in Morningside (now part of Astley Ainslie Hospital), where he met, amongst others, Agnes Syme, Syme's daughter from another marriage and granddaughter of physician Robert Willis. While Lister thought that Agnes was not conventionally pretty, he admired her quickness of mind, her familiarity with medical practice, and her warmth. He became a frequent visitor to Millbank and met a much wider group of eminent people than he would have in London.

In the same month, Lister began assisting Syme at the University of Edinburgh In a letter to his father, Lister expressed surprise at the size of the infirmary and spoke about his impressions of Syme, "..is larger than I expected to find it; there are 200 Surgical beds, and a large number in other departments. At University College Hospital there were only about 60 Surgical beds, so altogether a prospect appears to be opening of a very profitable stay here. ...Syme is, I suppose, the first of British surgeons, and to observe the practice and hear the conversation of such a man is of the greatest possible advantage". By October 1853, Lister decided to spend the winter in Edinburgh. Syme was so impressed by Lister, that after a month Lister became Syme's supernumerary house surgeon at the Royal Infirmary of Edinburgh and his assistant in his private hospital at Minto House in Chambers Street. As house surgeon, Lister assisted Syme during every operation, taking notes. It was a much-coveted position and gave Lister the option of choosing which of the ordinary cases he would attend. During this period, Lister presented a paper at the Royal Edinburgh Medico-Chirurgical Society on the structure of cancellous exostoses that had been removed by Syme, demonstrating that the method of ossification of these growths is the same as that which occurs in epiphyseal cartilage.

In September 1854, Lister's house surgeoncy appointment was finished. With the prospect of being out of a job, he spoke to his father about seeking a position at the Royal Free Hospital in London. However, Sharpey had written to Syme warning him that it was unlikely that Lister would be welcome at the Royal Free as he would have likely eclipsed Thomas H. Wakley, whose father held considerable sway at the hospital. Lister then made plans to tour Europe for a year. However, an opportunity presented itself with the death of noted infirmary surgeon and surgical lecturer at the Edinburgh Extramural School of Medicine Richard James Mackenzie. Mackenzie had been seen as a successor to Syme but had contracted cholera in Balbec in Scutari, Istanbul, while on a four-month volunteer sabbatical as field surgeon to the 79th Highlanders during the Crimean War. Lister proposed to Syme that he take over Mackenzie's position and become assistant surgeon to Syme. Syme initially rejected the idea, as Lister was not licensed to operate in Scotland, but later warmed to the idea. In October 1854, Lister was appointed as a lecturerLister successfully transferred the lease held by Mackenzie at his lecture room at 4 High School Yards, to himself. On 21 April 1855, Lister was elected a Fellow of the Royal College of Surgeons of Edinburgh and two days later rented a home at 3 Rutland Square. In June 1855, Lister made a hurried trip to Paris to take a course on operative surgery on the dead body and returned in June.

At the Royal Infirmary

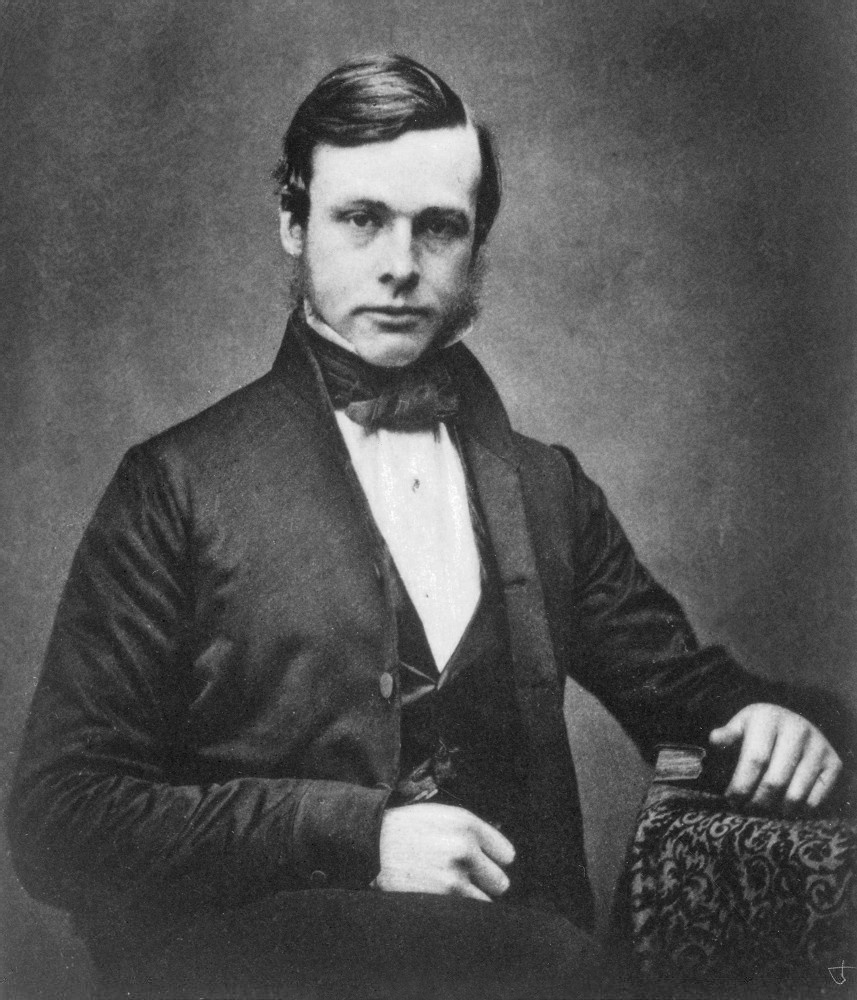
Joseph Lister c. 1855

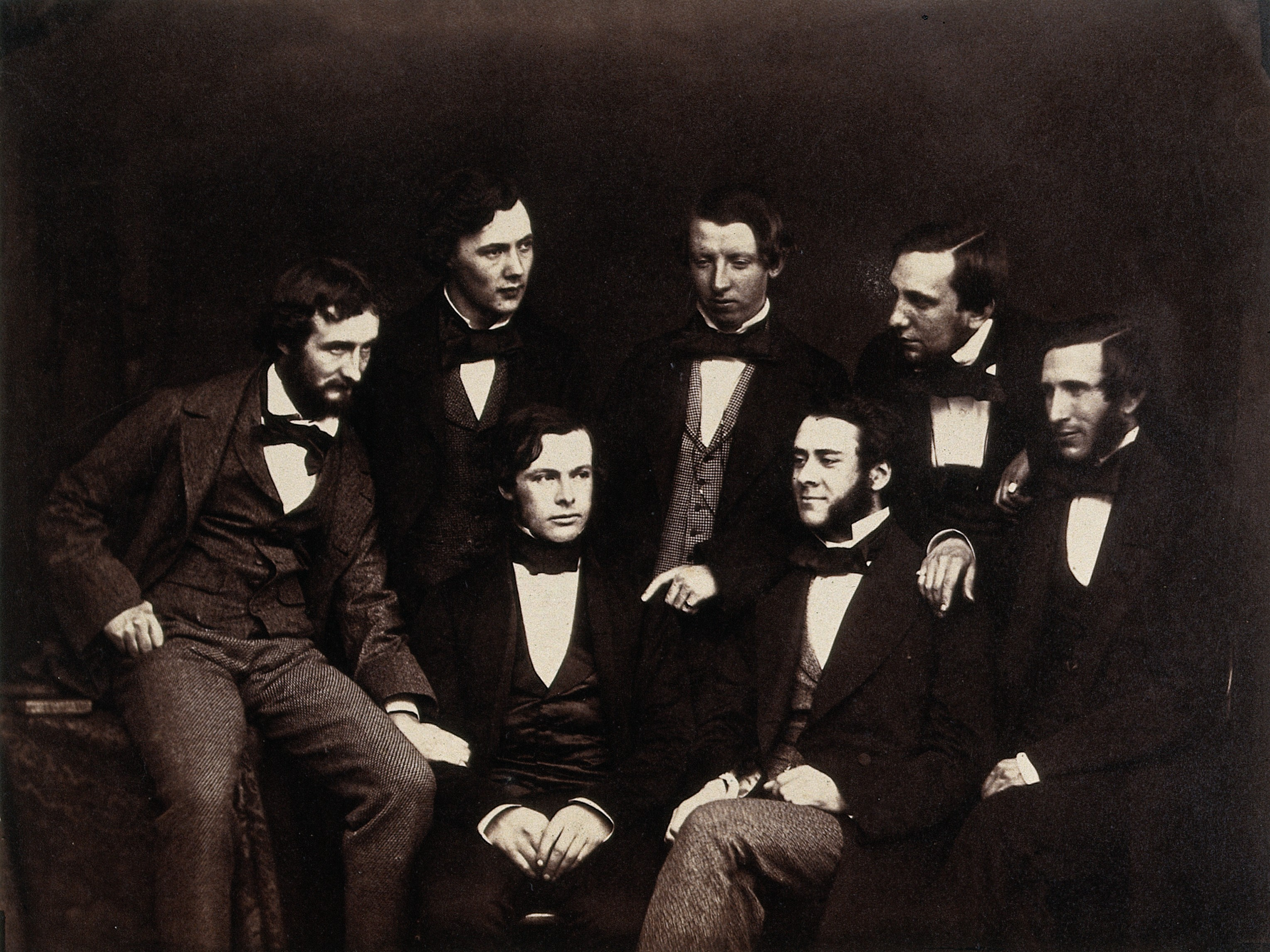
Lister with his colleagues at the Old Royal Infirmary

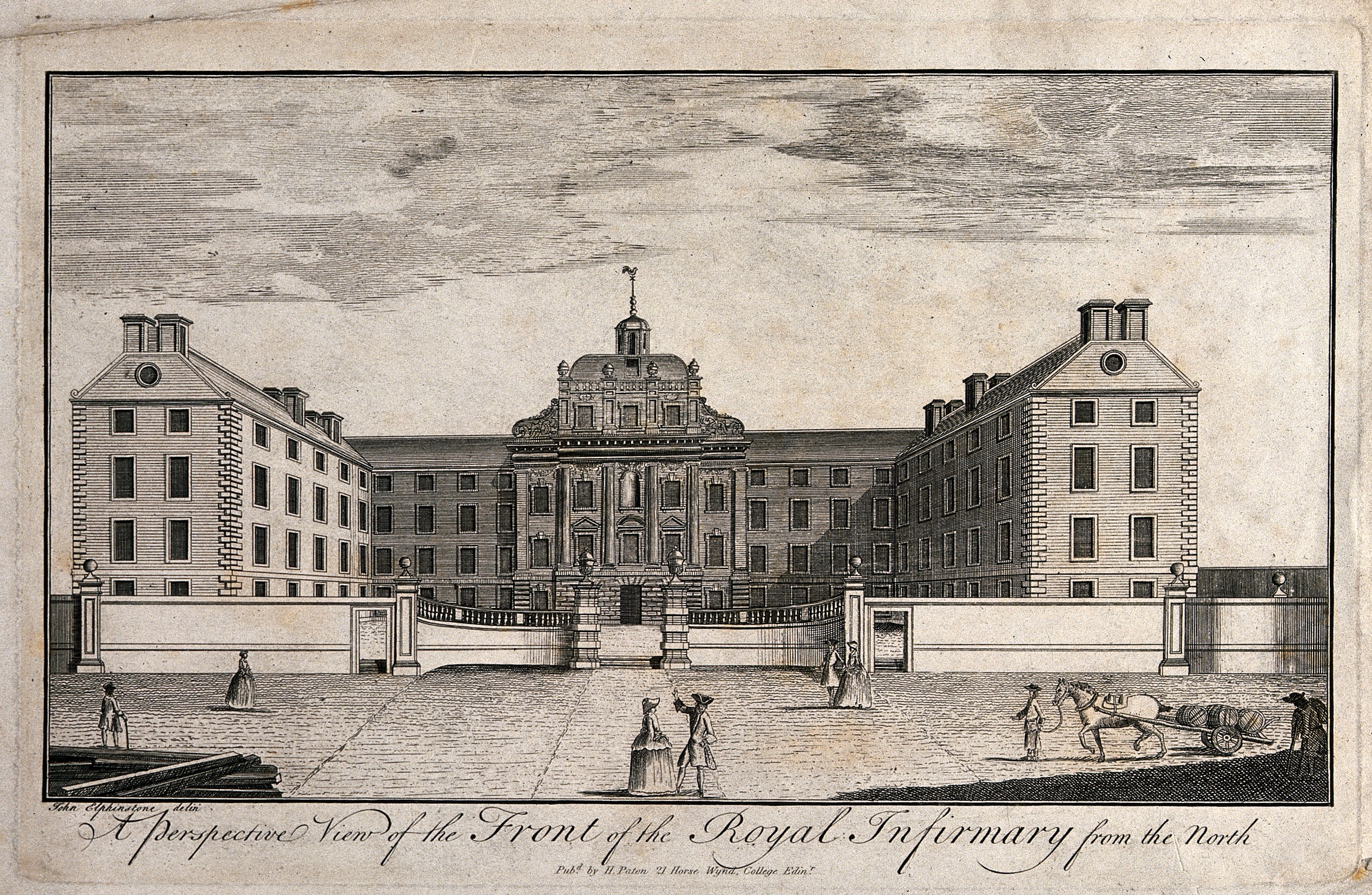
The old infirmary

=== Extramural lecturing ===
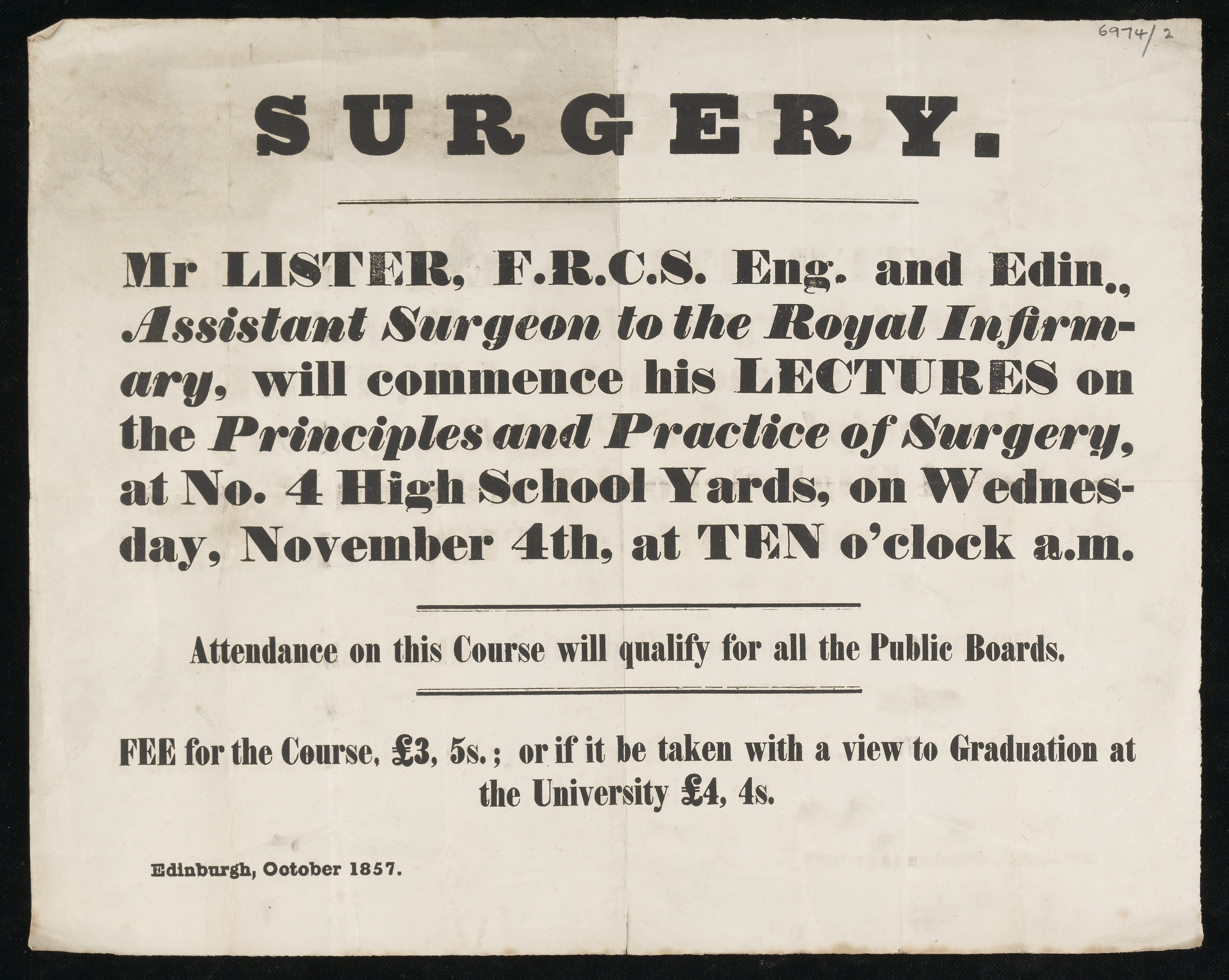
Poster announcing the Joseph Lister lecturers at High School Yards

On 7 November 1855, Lister gave his first extramural lecture on the "Principles and Practice of Surgery", in a lecture theatre at 4 High School Yards known as Old Jerusalem, directly located across from the infirmary. His first lecture was read from 21 pages of foolscap folio. Lister's first lectures were based on notes, either read or spoken, but over time he used notes less and less, becoming extempore in his speech, slowly and deliberately forming his argument as he went along. With this deliberate way of speaking, he managed to overcome a slight, occasional stammer which in his early days had been more pronounced.

His first student was John Batty Tuke, in a class of nine or ten, mostly consisting of dressers. Within a week, 23 people had joined. In the next year, only eight people turned up. In the summer of 1858, Lister had the ignominious experience of reading his lecture to a single student, who arrived ten minutes late. Seven more students arrived later.

His first lecture focused on the concept of surgery, giving a definition of disease that linked it to the Hippocratic Oath. He then explained that surgery could have more benefits than medicine, which could only comfort the patient at best. He then explained the attributes a good surgeon should exhibit, before finishing the lecture by recommending Syme's book "Principles of Surgery". Lister completed 114 lectures that followed a standard syllabus. Lecture VII described his earliest experiment on inflammation, where he put mustard on his arm and watched the results. Lectures IV to IX dealt with the circulation of blood. Inflammation was discussed in lectures X to XIII. The second half of the course dealt with clinical surgery. For the last four days, he gave two lectures a day, to complete the event before his wedding, with the first course ending on 18 April 1856. In the summer of 1858, Lister started a second, completely separate course, where he lectured on surgical pathology and operative surgery.

=== Marriage ===
By mid-summer 1854, Lister had started to court Agnes Syme. Lister wrote to his parents about his love but they worried about the union, particularly since he was Quaker and Agnes had given no indication that she would change her denomination. At that time when a Quaker married a person of another denomination, it was considered as marrying out of the society. Lister was determined to marry Agnes and sent a further letter to his father, asking him if his financial support would continue should Lister and Agnes marry. Lister's father replied that Agnes not being in the Society of Friends would not affect his pecuniary arrangements and offered his son extra money to buy furniture and suggested that Syme would offer a dowry and that he would negotiate with Syme directly on it. His father suggested that Lister voluntarily resign from the Society of Friends. Lister made up his mind and subsequently left the Quakers to become a Protestant, later joining the congregation of the Saint Paul's Episcopal Church in Jeffrey Street, Edinburgh. In August 1855, Lister became engaged to Agnes Syme and on 23 April 1856, he married her in the drawing room of Millbank, Syme's house in Morningside. Agnes's sister stated that this was out of consideration of any Quaker relations. Only the Syme family were present. The Scottish physician and family friend John Brown toasted the couple after the reception.

The couple spent a month at Upton and the Lake District, followed by a three-month tour of the leading medical institutes in France, Germany, Switzerland, and Italy. They returned in October 1856. By this time, Agnes was enamoured with medical research and became Lister's partner in the laboratory for the rest of her life. When they returned to Edinburgh, the couple moved into a rented house at 11 Rutland Street in Edinburgh. The house was situated over three floors, with a study on the first floor that was converted into a consulting room for patients and a room with hot and cold taps on the second floor that became his laboratory. The Scottish surgeon Watson Cheyne, who was almost a surrogate son to Lister, stated after his death that Agnes had entered into her work wholeheartedly, had been his only secretary, and that they discussed his work on an almost equal footing.

Lister's books are full of Agnes's careful handwriting. Agnes would take dictation from Lister for hours at a stretch. Spaces would be left blank among the reams of Agnes's handwriting for small diagrams, that Lister would create using the camera lucida technique and Agnes would later paste in.

Lister's family

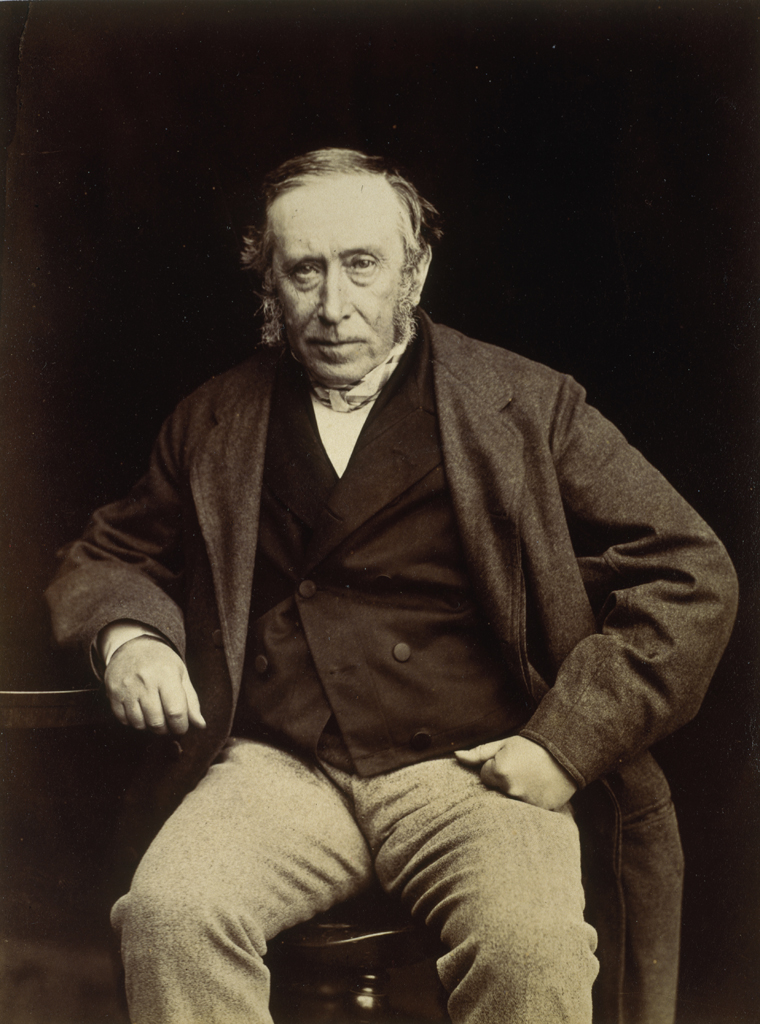
James Syme, c. 1855

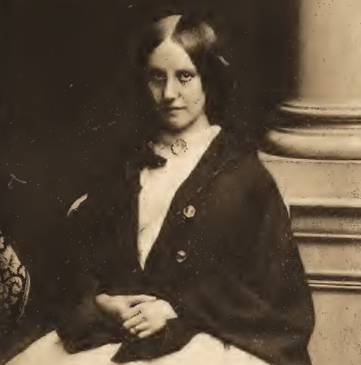
Photogravure of Agnes "Aggie" Syme in 1856, taken by Sir Emery Walker in 1924

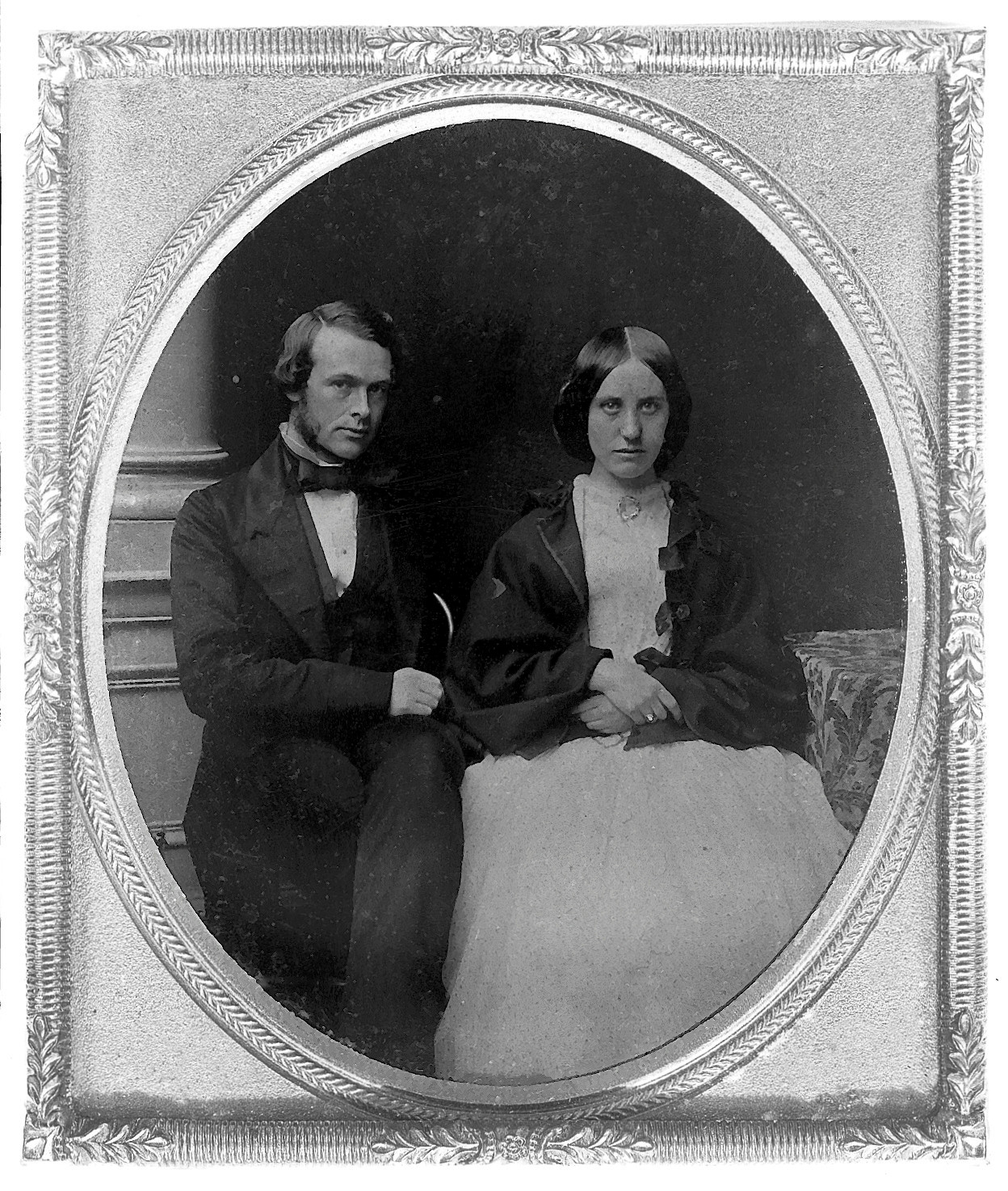
Wedding photograph of the couple, taken in April 1856

=== Assistant surgeoncy ===
On 13 October 1856, he was unanimously elected to the position of Assistant Surgeoncy at Edinburgh Royal Infirmary.

=== Contributions to physiology and pathology 1853–1859 ===
Between 1853 and 1859 in Edinburgh, Lister conducted a series of physiological and pathological experiments. His approach was rigorous and meticulous in both measurement and description. Lister was clearly aware of the latest advances in physiological research in France, Germany, and other European countries and maintained an ongoing discussion of his observations and results with other leading physicians in his peer group including Swiss physiologist Albert von Kölliker, German physiologists Wilhelm von Wittich, Theodor Schwann, and German pathologist Rudolf Virchow and ensured he correctly cited their work.

Lister's primary instrument of research was his microscope and his primary research subjects were frogs. Before his honeymoon, the couple had visited his uncle's house in Kinross. Lister took his microscope and captured several frogs, intending to use them in the study of inflammation, but they escaped. When he returned from his honeymoon, he used frogs captured from Duddingston Loch in his experiments. Lister carried out his experiments in his laboratory and in the veterinary college abattoir, on animals that were either dead or chloroformed and pithed, to deprive it of sensation. He also used bats, sheep, cats, rabbits, oxen and horses in his experiments. Lister's tirelessness in his pursuit of knowledge was illustrated by his assistant Thomas Annandale, who stated:

I confess that on more than one occasion our patience was a little tried by the long hours were thus engaged, and more particularly when the dinner hour was many hours overdue, but no one could work with Mr. Lister without imbibing some of his enthusiasm.

These experiments resulted in the publication of 11 papers between 1857 and 1859. They included the study of the nervous control of arteries, the earliest stages of inflammation, the early stages of coagulation, the structure of nerve fibres, and the study of the nervous control of the gut with reference to sympathetic nerves. He continued these experiments for three years until he was appointed to a position at the University of Glasgow.

==== 1853-1854 Pathology ====
In October 1853, Lister had the opportunity to examine a exostosis that was removed from a young woman by Syme. After his examination, he wrote a pathology paper for the Monthly Journal of Medical Science in January 1954. His work with Syme produced his second pathology report, published in the same journal in July 1854. The paper described the pathology of a carbuncle removed from a middle-aged man.

==== 1855: Beginning of inflammation research ====
In a letter dated 16 September 1855, Lister recorded the beginnings of his research into inflammation, six weeks before his lectures were to begin. Later in life, Lister stated that he considered his research into inflammation to have been an "essential preliminary" to his conception of the antiseptic principle and insisted that these early findings be included in any memorial volume of his work. In 1905, when he was 78 years old, he wrote:

If my works are read when I am gone, these will be the ones most highly thought of.

Inflammation is defined by four symptoms, heat, redness, swelling and pain. Surgeons prior to Lister saw it as the signal for the arrival of suppuration or putrefaction, local or general infection. As the germ theory of disease had not yet been discovered, the concept of infection did not yet exist. However, Lister knew that slowing of the blood through the capillaries seemed to precede inflammation. Joseph Jackson Lister had written a paper with Thomas Hodgkin that described how blood cells behaved prior to a clot, i.e. specifically how the concave cells fitted themselves together into stacks. Lister knew that to observe the next step, it was important that the tissue remain alive so the blood vessels could be observed through the microscope.

In September 1855, Lister's first experiment was on the artery of a frog viewed under his microscope, subjected to a water droplet of differing temperatures, to determine the early stage of inflammation. He initially applied a water droplet at 80 °F (27 °C) which caused the artery to contract for a second and the flow to cease, then dilate as the area turned red and the flow of blood increased. He progressively increased the temperature to 200 °F (93 °C). The blood slowed down and then coagulated. He continued the experiment on the wing of a chloroformed bat to widen his research focus. Lister concluded that the contraction of the vessels led to the exclusion of blood cells from the capillaries, not their arrest, and that blood serum continued to flow. This was his first independent discovery.

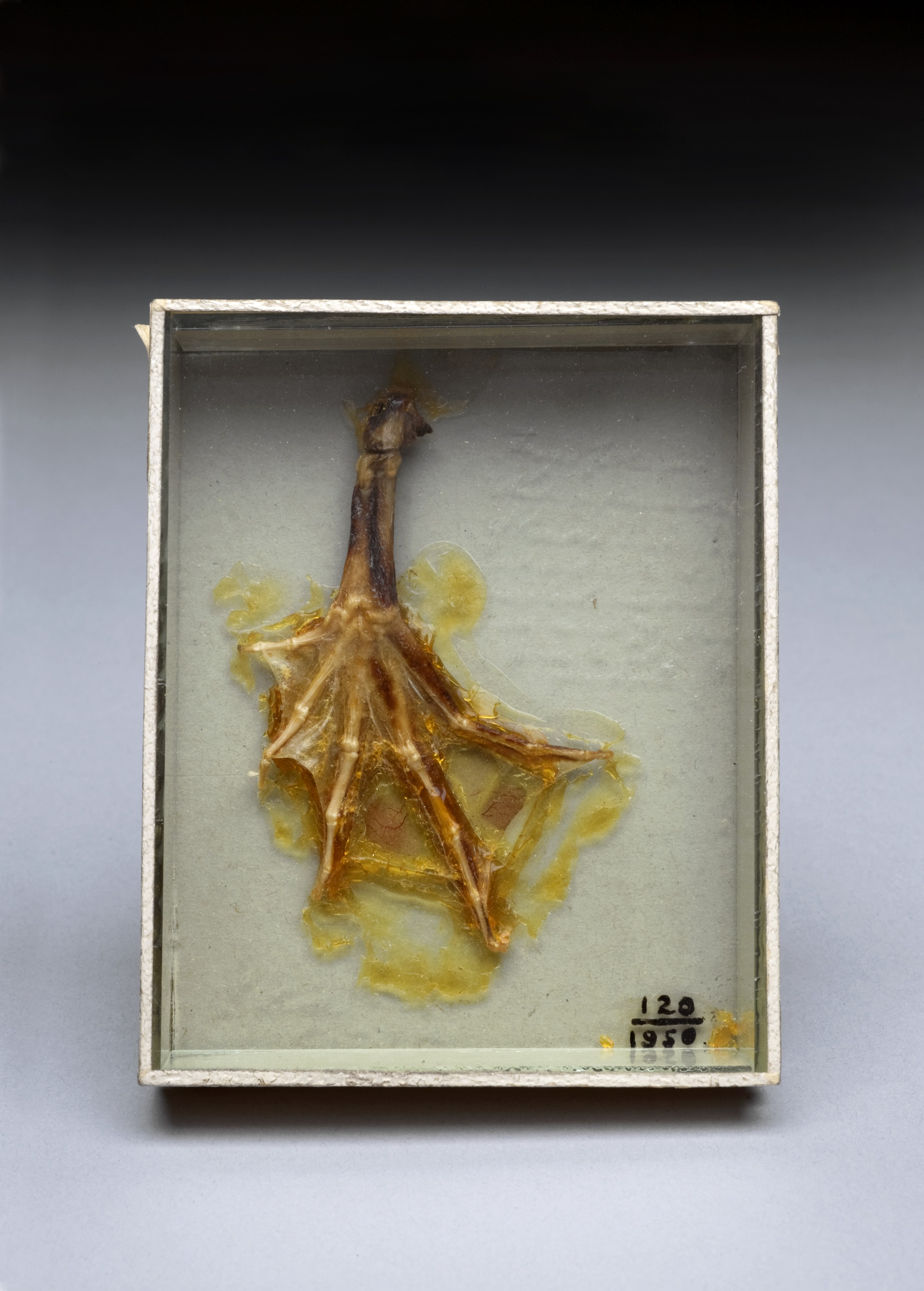
Frog's web prepared by Joseph Lister, 1857

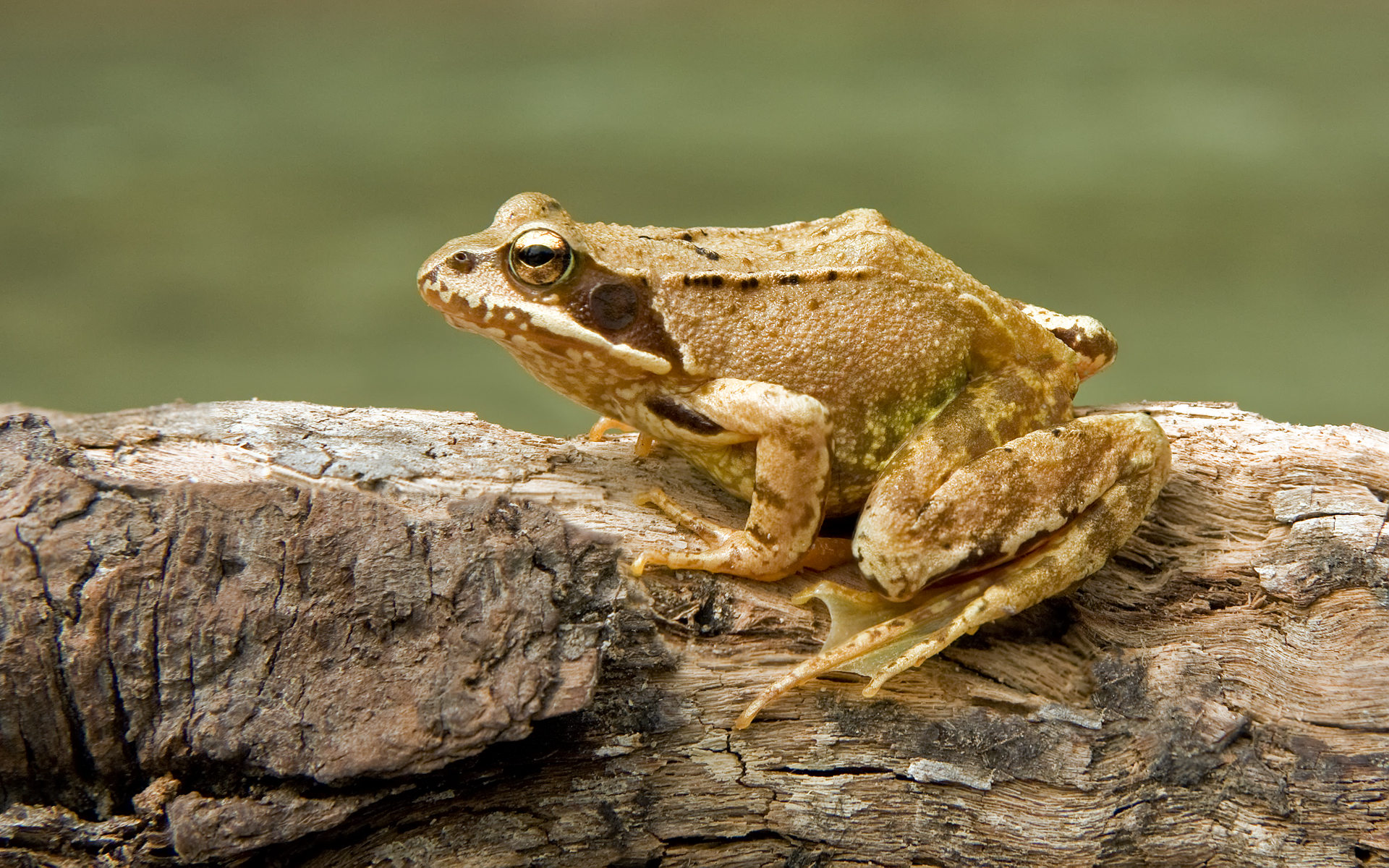
Specimen of common frog that Lister used in his early experiments

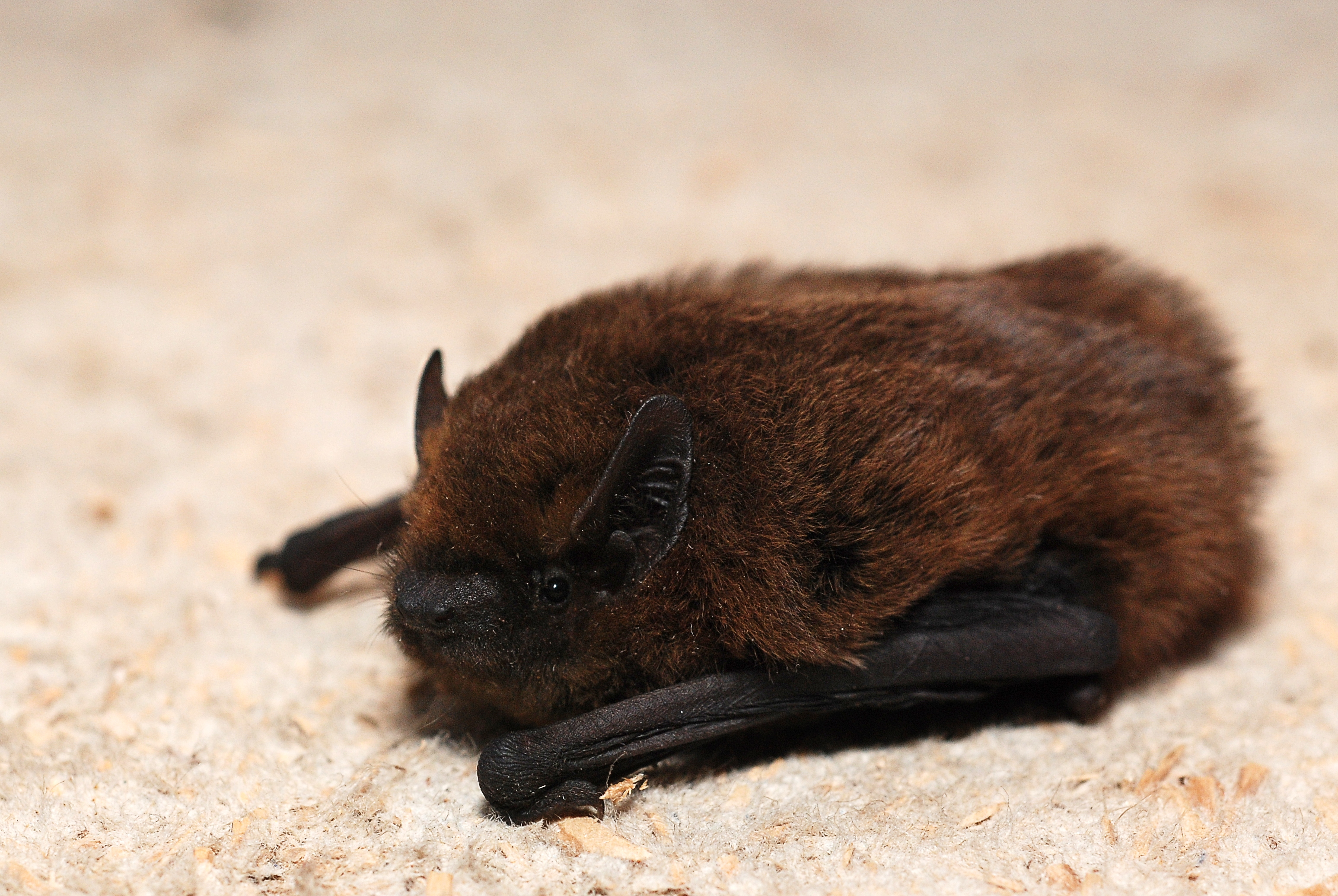
Specimen of common bat found at Duddingston Loch that Lister experimented on

The experiments ceased between October 1855 and continued in September 1856 when the couple moved into Rutland Square. Lister started with mustard as an irritant, then Croton oil, acetic acid, oil of Cantharidin and chloroform and many others. These experiments led to the production of three papers. His first paper grew out of the need to prepare for these extramural lectures and had begun the year before, continuing in development for six weeks after he moved into Rutland Street. The early paper, titled: "On the early stages of inflammation as observed in the Foot of a Frog" was read to the Royal College of Surgeons of Edinburgh on 5 December 1856. The last third was read out extempore.

==== 1856 Beginning of coagulation research ====
Lister also conducted research into the process of coagulation during this period. He had observed inflammation in certain cases of septicaemia that affected the blood vessel's lining, and led to intravascular blood clotting, which led to putrefaction and secondary haemorrhage. A simple experiment in December 1856 described by Agnes, where he pricked his own finger to observe the process of coagulation. led to five physiology papers on coagulation between 1858and 1863.

Several competing theories explained the occurrence of a blood clot, and although the theories were largely abandoned, it was still thought that blood contained a liquifying agent, i.e. fibrin held in a solution of ammonia that became known as the "Ammonia theory". Once the blood escaped from the wound, minute quantities of ammonia would evaporate from the blood resulting in the release of fibrin that would coagulate the blood.

In 1824, Charles Scudamore had proposed carbonic acid as the solution. The prevailing theory was from Benjamin Ward Richardson, who won the 1857 Astley Cooper triennial prize for an essay where he postulated that blood remained liquid due to the presence of ammonia. In the same year, Ernst Wilhelm von Brücke proposed that the vital actions of the vessels inhibited the blood's natural tendency to coagulate.

==== 1856 On the minute structure of involuntary muscle fibre ====
Lister's third paper, published in 1858 in the same journal and read before the Royal Society of Edinburgh on 1 December 1856, concerned the histology and function of the minute structures of involuntary muscle fibres. The experiment, conducted in the autumn of 1856, was designed to confirm Kölliker's observations on the structure of individual muscle fibres. Kölliker's description had been criticised, as he had used needles to separate the tissue to observe individual cells, and his critics said that he had observed artefacts from the experiment rather than real muscle cells. Lister proved conclusively that the muscle fibres of blood vessels, described by Lister as slightly flattened and elongated, were similar to those found by Kölliker in pig intestine, but wrapped spirally and individually around the innermost membrane. He stated that the variations in shape, from long tubular bodies with pointed ends and elongated nuclei to short "spindles" with squat nuclei, represented different phases of muscular contraction. During the "Huxley Lecture" he stated in retrospect, that he could not imagine a more efficient mechanism to constrict these vessels.

==== 1857 On the flow of the lacteal fluid in the mesentery of the mouse ====
His next paper was a short report based on observations that he had made in 1853. This first experiment, as opposed to purely microscope work, determined the nature of the flow of chyle in the lymphatics and whether the lacteals in the gastrointestinal wall could absorb solid granules from the lumen. For the first experiment, a mouse fed beforehand on bread and milk was chloroformed and then had its abdomen opened and a length of intestine placed on glass under a microscope. Lister repeated the experiment several times and each time saw mesenteric lymph flowing in a steady stream, without visible contractions of the lacteals. For the second experiment, Lister dyed some bread with indigo dye and fed it to a mouse, with the result that no indigo particles were ever seen in the chyle. Lister delivered the paper to the 27th meeting of the British Medical Association, held in Dublin 26 August to 2 September 1857. The paper was formally published in 1858 in the Quarterly Journal of Microscopical Science.

==== Seven papers on the origin and mechanism of inflammation ====
In 1858, Lister published seven papers on physiological experiments he conducted on the origin and mechanism of inflammation. Two of these papers were research into the neural control by the nervous system of blood vessels, "An Inquiry Regarding the Parts of the Nervous System Which Regulate the Contractions of the Arteries" and "On the Cutaneous Pigmentary System of the Frog", while the third and the principal paper in the series was titled: "On the Early Stages of Inflammation", which extended the research of Wharton Jones. The three papers were read to the Royal Society of London on 18 June 1857. They had originally been written as one paper and had been sent to Sharpey, John Goodsir and the English pathologist James Paget for review. However, Paget and Goodsir both recommended that it be published as three separate papers.

==== 1858 Nervous System Regulatation of the Contractions of the Arteries ====
During 1856, Lister has been thinking about the nervous control of blood vessels and had been studying the work of various French researchers who were examining the denervation of the sympathetic nerves. Lister thought that how blood vessels behaved when irritated was important to understand the inflammatory process.

The experiments on vasomotor control began in the autumn of 1856 and continued until the autumn of the next year. In total, Lister conducted 13 experiments, some of which were repeated to verify the results of other experiments in the series. He used a microscope fitted with an ocular micrometer, a recent invention, to measure the diameter of blood vessels in a common frogs web. In a before-and-after experiment, he ablated parts of the central nervous system and also before and after, split the sciatic nerve. Lister concluded that blood vessel tone (Note: Known as vascular tone, that is defined as the degree of constriction experienced by a blood vessel relative to its maximally dilated state) was controlled from the medulla oblongata and the spinal cord. This refuted Wharton's conclusions, in his paper Observations on the State of the Blood and the Blood-Vessels in Inflammation. who was not able to confirm that the control of blood vessels of the hind legs was dependent upon spinal centres. In June 1858 he published his research "An Inquiry Regarding the Parts of the Nervous System Which Regulate the Contractions of the Arteries" in the Philosophical Transactions of the Royal Society.

In October 1857, the referee for Philosophical Transactions John Goodsir wrote to Sharpey who warned Lister that the experimental conclusions were similar to findings by the German physiologist Eduard Friedrich Wilhelm Pflüger. This was to enable Lister to print an acknowledgement. Pflüger found that vasomotor control was through nerve fibres connected to the spinal canal which were similar to Lister research showing vaso-motor fibres came from the spinal canal through the sciatic plexus. Although their approaches were similar, Lister used denervation and discovered that even after parts of the spinal cord were removed, the arterioles eventually recovered their contractility.

These experiments settled a contemporary dispute between physiologists concerning the origin of the influence exercised over blood vessel diameter (calibre) by the sympathetic nervous system. The dispute began when Albrecht von Haller formulated a new theory known as Sensibility and Irritability in his 1752 thesis De partibus corporis humani sensibilibus et irritabilibus. The dispute had been debated since the middle of the 18th century. Haller put forward the view that contractability was a power inherent in the tissues which possessed it, and was a fundamental fact of physiology. It concerned the property of irratability, the supposed automatic response of muscular tissue, especially visceral tissue, to external stimulus, that caused them to contract when stimulated. Even as late as 1853, highly respected textbooks, for example William Benjamin Carpenter Principles of Human Physiology stated the doctrine of 'irritability' was a fact beyond dispute, and this was still considered contentious when John Hughes Bennett created the Physiology article for the 8th edition of Encyclopædia Britannica in 1859.

==== 1858 On the Cutaneous Pigmentary System of the Frog ====
The second part of the original paper was an experiment into the nature and behaviour of pigment. It had been known for some years that the skin of frogs is capable of varying in colour under different circumstances. The first account of this mechanism was described by Ernst Wilhelm von Brücke of Vienna in 1832 and later investigated further by Wilhelm von Wittich in 1854 and Emile Harless in 1846.

Lister had noted that the beginning of inflammation was always accompanied by a change of colour in the frog's web. He determined that the pigments consisted of "very minute pigment-granules" contained in a network of stellate cells, the branches of which, subdividing minutely and anastomosing freely with one another and with those of neighbouring cells, constitute a delicate network in the substance of the true skin. It had been supposed that the concentration and diffusion of the pigment depended upon the contraction and extension of the branches of the star-shaped cells in which it was contained; and that only these movements of the cells were under the influence of the nervous system. At the time, there was no cell theory of matter nor were there any dyes or fixatives that could used to enhance experimental discovery. Indeed, Lister wrote of this, stating "The extreme delicacy of the cell wall makes it very difficult to trace it among the surrounding tissue". Lister observed that it was the pigment granules themselves and not the cells that moved, and that this movement was not merely brought about by the control of the nervous system, but perhaps by the direct action of irritants on the tissues themselves. He believed that the pigment reflected the activity of blood vessels, though it was the slowing of blood flow that initiated the process of inflammation.

Figures from the 1858 paper that show how the pigment is controlled within chromatophores cells

Fig 1 represent the frog pigment granules fully translocated within the frog melanophore cells. Fig 2 shows the pigment concentrated in the core of the cell.

Fig 3 represents the two cells with the melanin fully diffused.

Fig. 4 represents the colouring matter in the same two cells during the progress of the process of concentration.

Fig. 5 shows the pigment undergoing further concentration in lower of the two cells

In Fig. 6 the pigment is now concentrated in the middle of the body of the cell, while the extremeties of the cell contain the colourless fluid, which is invisible.

In Fig 7, the chromatophore cells are show in the wall of a large artery. The pigment is now fully concentrated with the black masses, seen edgewise are disc-shaped.

==== 1858 On the early stages of inflammation ====
The focal study was the longest paper of the three and the last to be published. Like many of his colleagues, Lister was aware that inflammation was the first stage of many postoperative conditions and that excessive inflammation often preceded the onset of a septic condition. Once that happened, the patient would develop a fever. Lister had come to the conclusion that accurate knowledge of the functioning of inflammation could not be obtained by researching the more advanced stages, which were subject to secondary processes. He therefore started in quite a different way from that of almost all his predecessors by directing his enquiry to the first deviations from health, hoping to find in them "the essential character of the morbid state most unequivocally stamped". Essentially, Lister performed these experiments to discover the causes of erythrocyte adhesiveness. As well as experimenting on frogs' web and bats wing, Lister used blood that he had obtained from the end of his own finger that was inflamed and compared it against blood from one of his other fingers. He discovered that after something irritating had been applied to living tissues which did not kill them outright, firstly the blood vessels contracted and their lumen became very small; the part became pale. Secondly, the vessels after an interval, dilated and the part became red. Thirdly, some of the blood in the most injured blood vessels slowed down in its flow and coagulated. Redness occurred which, being solid, could not be pressed away. Lastly, the fluid of the blood passed through the vessel walls and formed a "blister" at the injury. He found that each tiny artery was surrounded by a muscle, which enabled it to contract and dilate. He found further that this contraction and dilation was not an individual act on its part, but was an act dictated to it by the nervous cells in the spinal cord.

The paper was divided into four sections:

- The aggregation of red blood cells when removed from the body, i.e., which occurs during coagulation.

This section deals with the aggregation of the cells of the blood, which occurs during the process of clotting. It shows that when blood is removed from the body this aggregation depends on their possessing a certain degree of mutual adhesiveness, which is much greater in the white blood cells than in the red blood cells. This property, though apparently not depending upon vitality, is capable of remarkable variations, in consequence of slight chemical changes in the blood plasma.

- The structure and function of blood vessels.

This section shows that the arteries regulate, by their contractility, the amount of blood transmitted in a given time through the capillaries, but that neither full dilatation, extreme contraction, nor any intermediate state of the arteries, is capable per se of producing accumulation of blood cells in the capillaries.

- The effects of irritants on blood vessels, e.g., hot water.

This section details how the effects are two-fold

- firstly, a dilatation of the arteries (commonly preceded by a brief period of contraction), which is developed through the nervous system and is not confined to the part brought into actual contact with the irritant, but implicates a surrounding area of greater or less extent; and
- secondly, an alteration in the tissues upon which the irritant directly acts, which makes them influence the blood in the same manner as does ordinary solid matter. This imparts adhesiveness to both the red and the white blood cells, making them prone to stick to one another and to the walls of the vessels, and so gives rise, if the damage to the tissues be severe, to stagnation of the blood flow and ultimately to obstruction.

- The effects of irritants on tissue.

The fourth section describes the effects of irritants upon the tissues. It proves that those which destroy the tissues when they act powerfully, produce by their gentler action only a condition bordering on loss of vitality, i.e. a condition in which the tissues are incapacitated, but from which they may recover, provided the irritation has not been too severe or protracted.

Lister's paper was able to show that capillary action is governed by the constriction and dilation of the arteries. The action is affected by trauma, (Note: Defined as traumatic injury, sudden physical injury caused by an external force, which does not rise to the level of major trauma) irritation or reflex action through the central nervous system. He noticed that although the capillary walls lack muscle fibres, they are highly elastic and are subject to significant capacity variations that are influenced by arterial blood flow into the circulatory system. Drawings made with a camera lucida were used to depict the experimental reactions. They displayed vascular stasis and congestion in the early stages of the body's reaction to damage. According to Lister, vascular alterations that were initially brought on by reflexes occurring within the nervous system were followed by changes that were brought on by local tissue damage. In the conclusions of the paper, Lister linked his experimental observations to physical clinical conditions, for example skin damage resulting from boiling water and trauma occurring after a surgical incision.

After the paper was read to the Royal Society in June 1857, it was very well received and his name became known outside Edinburgh.

Two camera lucida illustrations used to illustrate the early stages of inflammation

Frogs web that has been irritated with mustard

In Fig. 2 Lister pinched the frogs web with padded forceps. The frog grew paler with the healthy pigment assuming the angular or stellate shape similar to the previous diagram. The damaged chromatophore cells remain fully diffused.

==== Spontaneous Gangrene from Arteritis ====
Lister's first paper "On a Case of Spontaneous Gangrene from arteritis, and on the Causes of Coagulation of the Blood in Diseases of the Blood-Vessels" is an account of a case of spontaneous gangrene in a child. The paper on coagulation was read before the Medico-Chirugical Society of Edinburgh on 18 March 1858. In an account written by Agnes, she states that there was no one at the medical school meeting who was capable of appreciating it, and the remarks made upon it were poor. There were suggestions for improvement which Lister threw out. There was lots of cheering, proclaiming it a great success. The paper was written up at 7 p.m., with Lister dictating and Agnes writing it during a 50-minute session, followed by the exposition to the society at George Street hall at 8 p.m.

Lister first used the amputated legs from sheep and discovered that blood remained liquid in the blood vessels for up to six days and still underwent coagulation, albeit more slowly when the vessel was opened. He also noticed that if vessels remained fresh, the blood would remain fluid. In later experiments he moved to cats. He tried to emulate an inflamed blood vessel by exposing the jugular vein of the animal and applying irritants then constricting and opening the flow, to measure the effect. He noticed that in the damaged vessel the blood would coagulate He eventually came to the conclusion that if there was ammonia in the blood, it was much less important than the condition of the vessel in stopping coagulation. He tested his hypothesis on three cadavers by examining the condition of various veins and arteries and found he was correct. He also concluded that the Ammonia theory did not apply to vessels in the body, but it could apply to blood outside the body. While that was incorrect, his other conclusions were accurate, specifically, that inflammation in the blood vessel lining results in coagulation occurring. Lister realised that vascular occlusion increased the pressure through the network of small vessels, leading to the formation of "liquor sanguinis", (Note: The Latin name for Blood plasma) which led to further localised damaged perfusion. Certainly, Lister had no knowledge of the coagulation cascade but his experiments contributed to the current understanding of clotting, the final product of coagulation.

Lister continued experimenting in April, examining vessels and blood from a horse. This resulted in another communication to the society on 7 April. His work in coagulation continued until the end of the year. Lister's second article on coagulation was published in August 1858, and was one of two case histories he published in the Edinburgh Medical Journal in 1858. Titled "Case of Ligature of the Brachial Artery, Illustrating the Persistent Vitality of the Tissues", the history described saving from amputation a patient's arm that had been constricted by a tourniquet for 30 hours. The second history was titled "Example of mixed Aortic Aneurysm" and was published in December 1858.

==== 1858 Functions of the visceral nerves ====
Lister continual interest in the nervous control of blood vessels led him to conduct a series of experiments during June and July 1858, where he researched the nervous control of the gut. The research was published in the form of three letters sent to Sharpey. The first two letters were sent on 28 June and 7 July 1858. The last letter was published as the "Preliminary Account of an Inquiry into the Functions of the Visceral Nerves, with special reference to the so-called Inhibitory System".

He had been studying the work of Claude Bernard, LJ Budge and Augustus Waller and had become interested in what was known as "sympathetic action", where inflammation appeared in a different area from the source of irritation. This led him to study Pflüger's 1857 paper titled "About the inhibitory nervous system for the peristaltic movements of the intestines", proposed that the splanchnic nerves instead of exciting the intestine muscle layer that they are connected to, inhibit their movement. The German physiologist Eduard Weber made the same claim. Pflüger had named these inhibitory nerves "Hemmungs-Nervensystem", a name that Syme, at Lister's request thought they should be translated as inhibitory nervous system. Lister dismissed Pflüger's idea of inhibitory nerves as not only implausible but not supported by observation, as a mild stimulus caused increased muscle activity which changed to a decreased muscle activity as the incoming stimulus became stronger. Lister believed that it was questionable whether the motions of the heart or the intestines are ever checked by the spinal system, except for brief periods.

Lister conducted a series of experiments using mechanical irritation and galvanism to stimulate the nerves and spinal cord in rabbits and frogs. He considered rabbits as ideal experimental subjects due to their active gut movement. To ensure their gut reflexes were not impaired, the rabbits were not anaesthetised. Lister conducted three experiments. In the first experiment, an incision was made in the rabbit's side and a section of intestine was pulled through the skin. Lister then connected a magnetic coil battery to the splanchnic nerves in the spinal cord. When the current was applied, the gut completely relaxed but when the current was applied locally, a small localised contraction occurred that did not spread to the bowel. Lister stated that "this observation is of fundamental importance, since it proves that the inhibitory influence does not operate directly upon the muscular tissue, but upon the nervous apparatus by which its contractions are, under ordinary circumstances, elicited". In the second experiment, Lister examined the reaction in a section of the bowel, when he restricted the blood supply by tying the vessels and found that there was an increase in peristalsis. When he applied current the gut relaxed. He concluded that activity in the gut was under the control of bowel wall nerves and had been stimulated due to loss of blood. In the third experiment, he removed the nerves from a section of the bowel while ensuring to maintain a good blood supply. This time, stimulation of the section had no effect except when the section would spontaneously contract.

During the histological study of the bowel wall, Lister discovered a plexus of neurons the myenteric plexus, that confirmed the observations made by Georg Meissner in 1857.

Lister concluded, "...it appears that the intestines possess an intrinsic ganglionic apparatus which is in all cases essential to the peristaltic movements, and, while capable of independent action, is liable to be stimulated or checked by other parts of the nervous system".

Although Lister did not believe in the inhibitory system, he did conclude that extrinsic nerves controlled the intestinal motor function indirectly through their effect on the plexus. It was not until 1964 that this was proven by Karl‐Axel Norberg.

==== Notice of further researches on the coagulation of the blood ====
Lister's third paper on coagulation was a short article in the form of a communication consisting of five pages that were read before the Medico-Chirugical Society of Edinburgh on 16 November 1859. In the paper, Lister found that the coagulation of blood was not solely dependent on the presence of ammonia, but may also be influenced by other factors. In a demonstration before the society, Lister had a sample of horse's blood that had been shed 29 hours earlier and added acetic acid to it. The blood remained fluid despite being acidified, but it eventually coagulated after being left to stand for 15 minutes. Lister demonstrated that the Ammonia theory was incorrect as the coagulation of the blood was not dependent on the presence of ammonia. He concluded that other factors may influence blood coagulation in addition to or instead of ammonia, and that the Ammonia theory was fallacious.

=== Glasgow appointment ===
On 1 August 1859, Lister wrote to his father to inform him of the ill-health of James Adair Lawrie, Regius Professor of Surgery at the University of Glasgow, believing he was close to death. The anatomist Allen Thomson had written to Syme to inform him of Lawrie's condition and that it was his opinion that Lister was the most suitable person for the position. Lister stated that Syme believed he should become a candidate for the position. He went on to discuss the merits of the post; a higher salary, being able to undertake more surgery and being able to create a bigger private practice. Lawrie died on 23 November 1859. In the following month, Lister received a private communication, although baseless, that confirmed he had received the appointment. However, it was clear the matter was not settled when a letter appeared in the Glasgow Herald on 18 January 1860 that discussed a rumour that the decision had been handed over to the Lord Advocate and officials in Edinburgh. The letter annoyed the members of the governing body of Glasgow University, the Senatus Academicus. The matter was referred to the Vice-Chancellor Thomas Barclay who tipped the decision in favour of Lister. On 28 January 1860, Lister's appointment was confirmed.

== Glasgow 1860–1869 ==
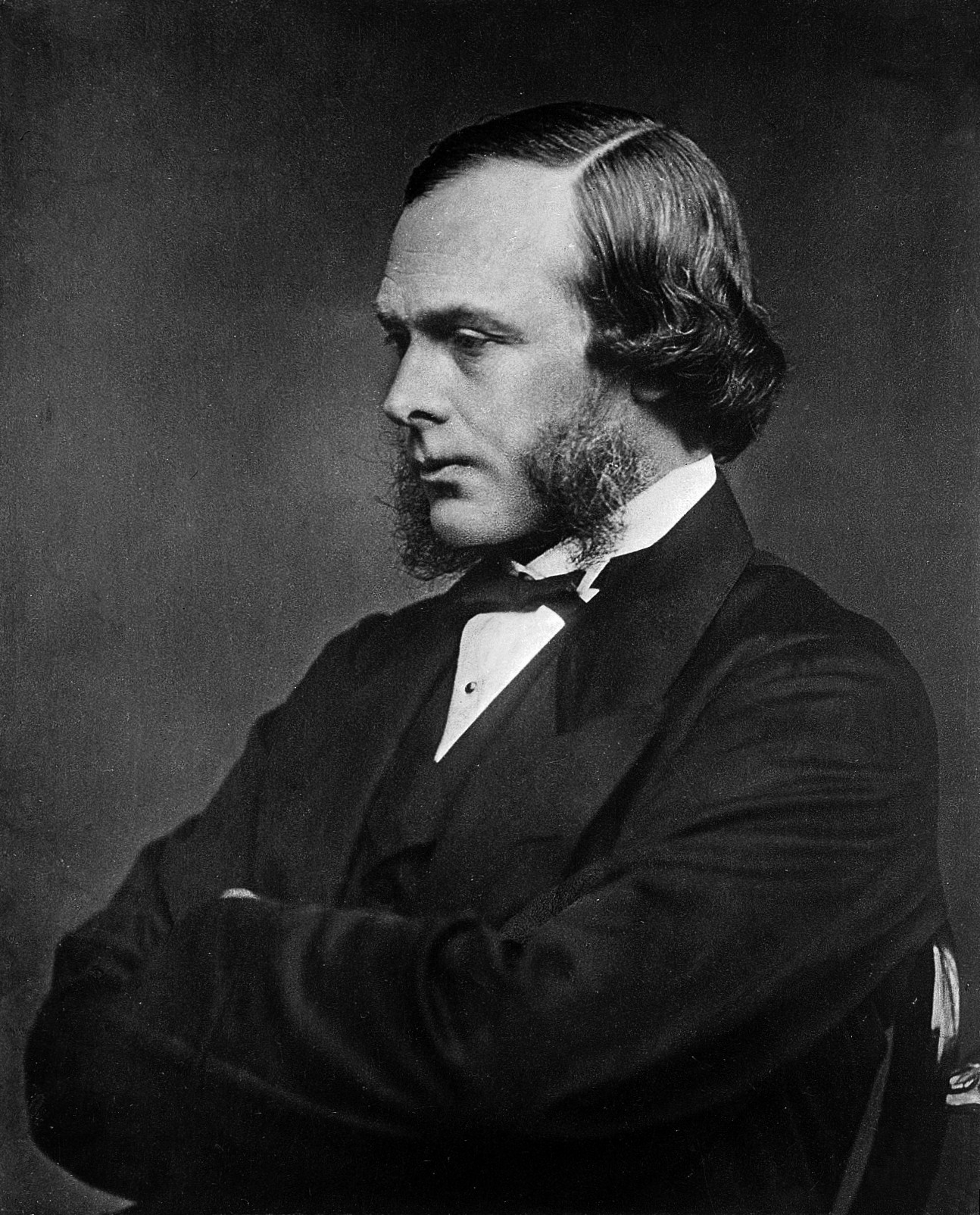
Joseph Lister 1860 by Thomas Annan

=== University life ===
To be formally inducted into the academic staff, Lister had to deliver a Latin oration before the senatus academicus. In a letter to his father, he described how surprised he was when a letter arrived from Allen Thomson informing him that the thesis had to be presented the next day on 9 March. Lister unable to start the paper until 2 a.m. that night, had only prepared around two-thirds of it, when he arrived in Glasgow. The rest was written at Thomson's house. In the letter, he described the dread he felt being admitted into the room prior to presenting the oration. After the thesis was read and Lister was inducted to the senate, he signed a statement not to act contrary to the wishes of the Church of Scotland. While the contents of his thesis have been lost, the title is known: De Arte Chirurgica Recte Erudienda ("On the proper way of teaching the art of surgery").

In early May 1860, the couple made the journey to Glasgow to move into their new house at 17 Woodside Place, at the time on the western edge of the city. In 1860, university life in Glasgow was lived in the grimy quadrangles of the small college on Glasgow High Street, a mile east of the city centre next to Glasgow Royal Infirmary (GRI) and the Cathedral and surrounded by the most squalid part of the old medieval city. The Scottish poet and novelist Andrew Lang wrote of his student days at the college, that while Coleridge could smell 75 different stenches during his student days in Cologne, Lang counted more. The city was so polluted the grass did not grow.

The position of Professor of Surgery at Glasgow was peculiar, as it did not carry with it an appointment as surgeon to the Royal Infirmary, as the university was separate from the hospital. The allotment of surgical wards to the care of the Professor of Surgery depended upon the goodwill of the directors of the infirmary. His predecessor Lawrie never held any hospital appointments at all. Having no patients to care for, Lister immediately began a summer lecture course. He discovered that college classrooms were considered too small and had low ceilings for the number of students, which made them unpleasant to be in when filled to overcrowding. Before his first lecture, the couple cleaned and painted the dingy lecture room assigned to them, at their own expense. He inherited a large class of students from his predecessor that grew rapidly.

After his first session, he wrote favourably of Glasgow:

The facilities I have here for prosecuting this course as compared to the difficulties I laboured under in Edinburgh are quite delightful – museums, abundant material and a good library all at my disposal and my colleague Allen Thompson co-operating in the kindest and most valuable manner

Glasgow university life

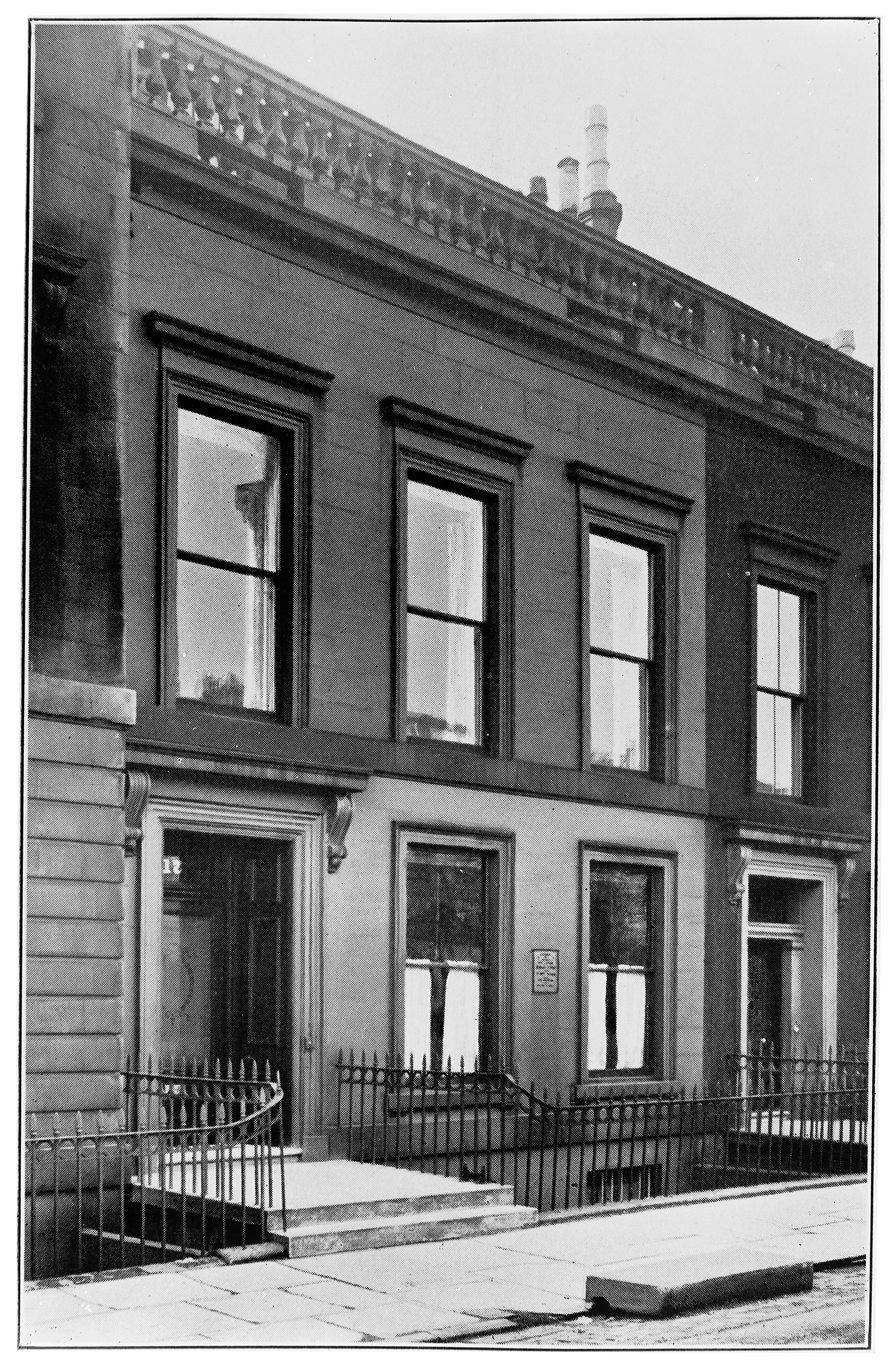
Woodside Place

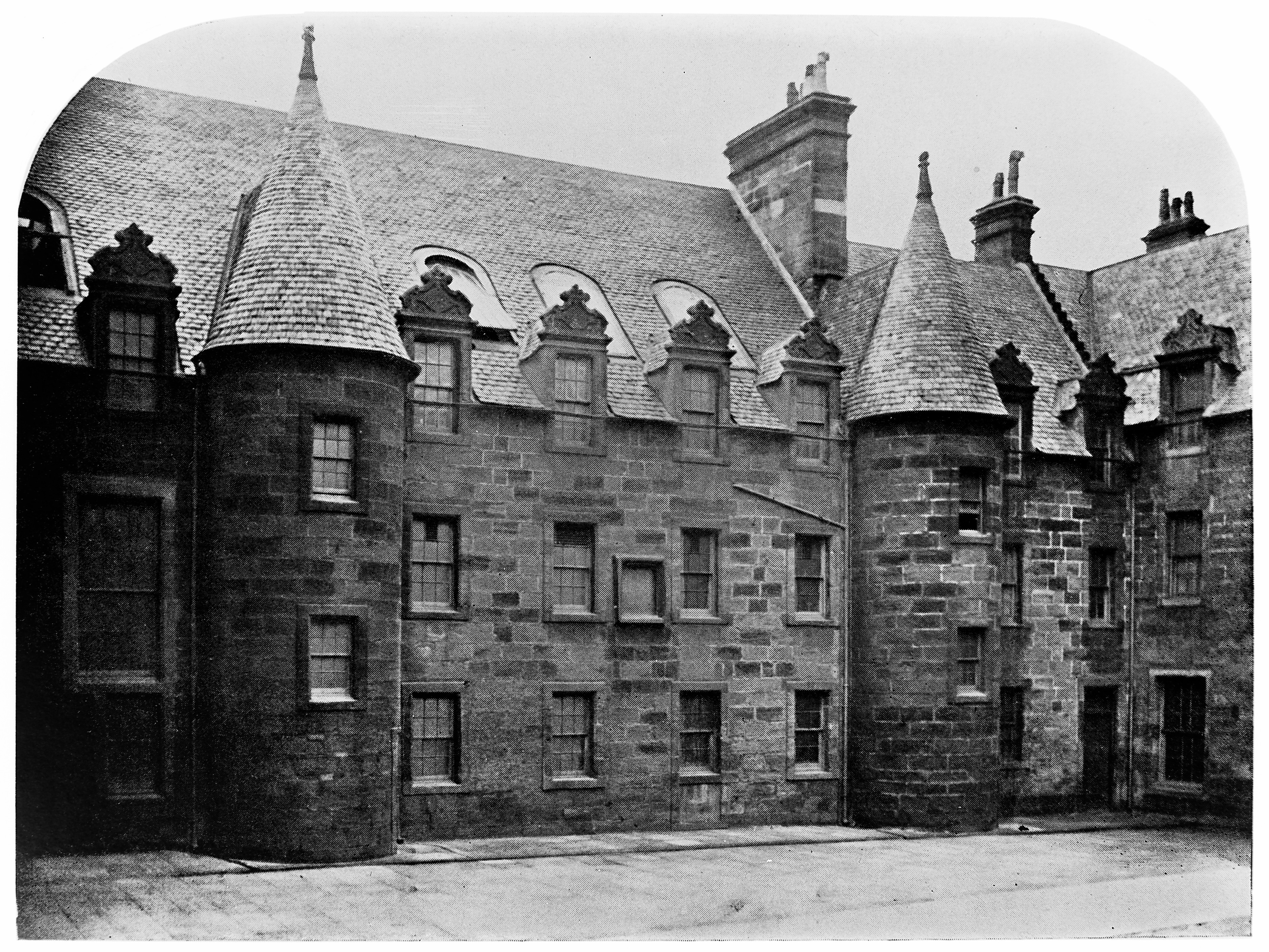
The old college

The old college entrance

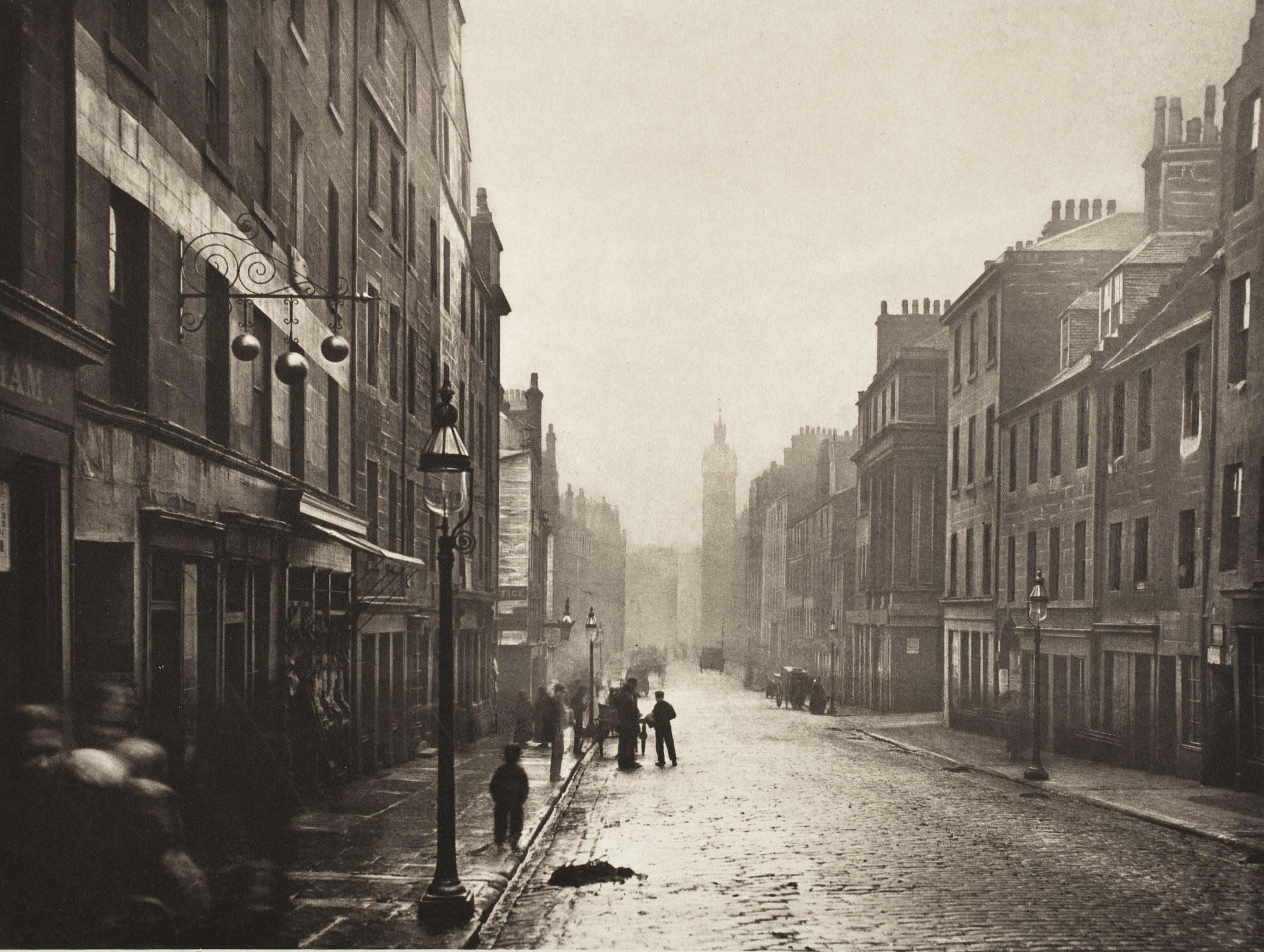
Glasgow high street from the college

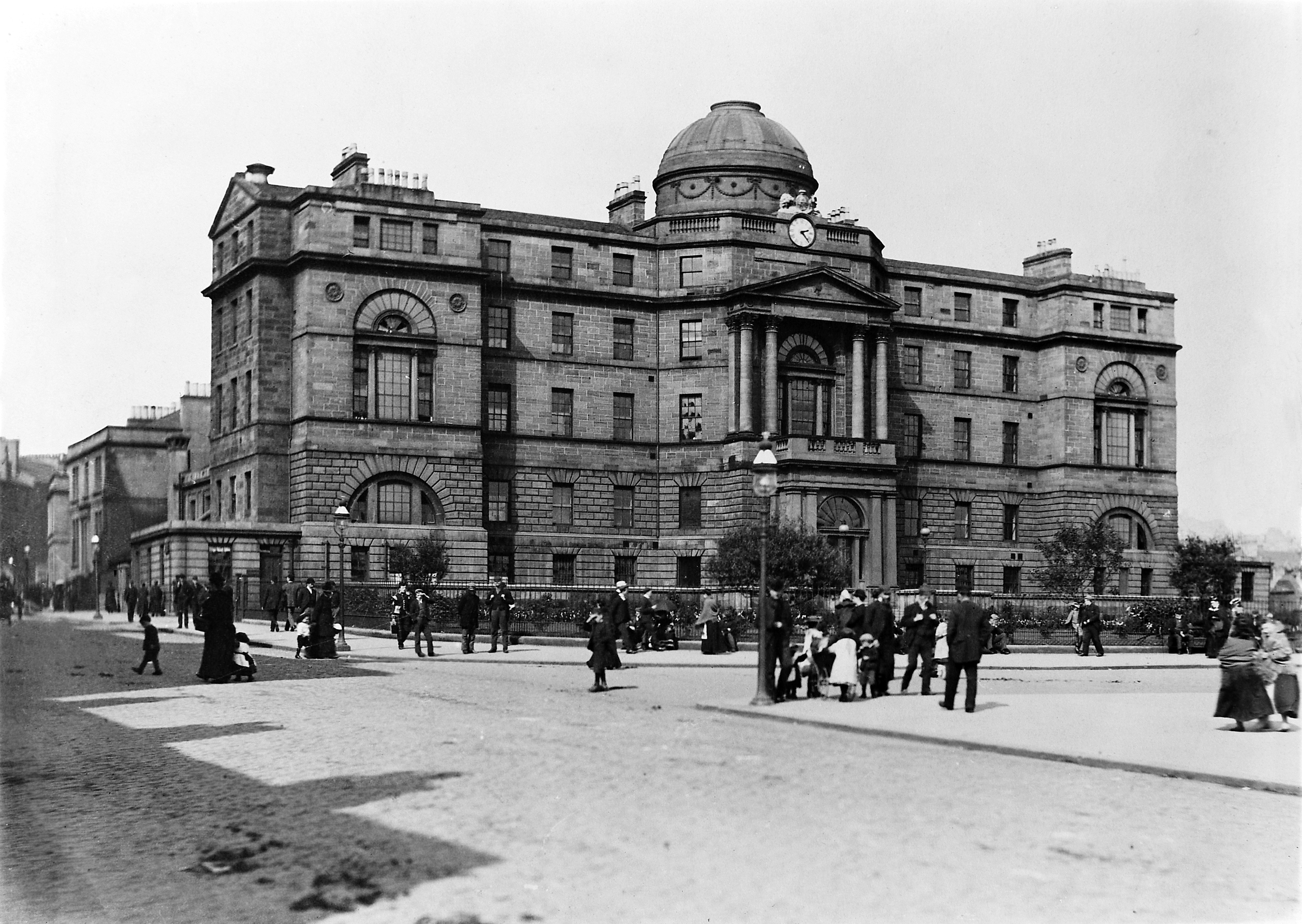
Glasgow Royal Infirmary

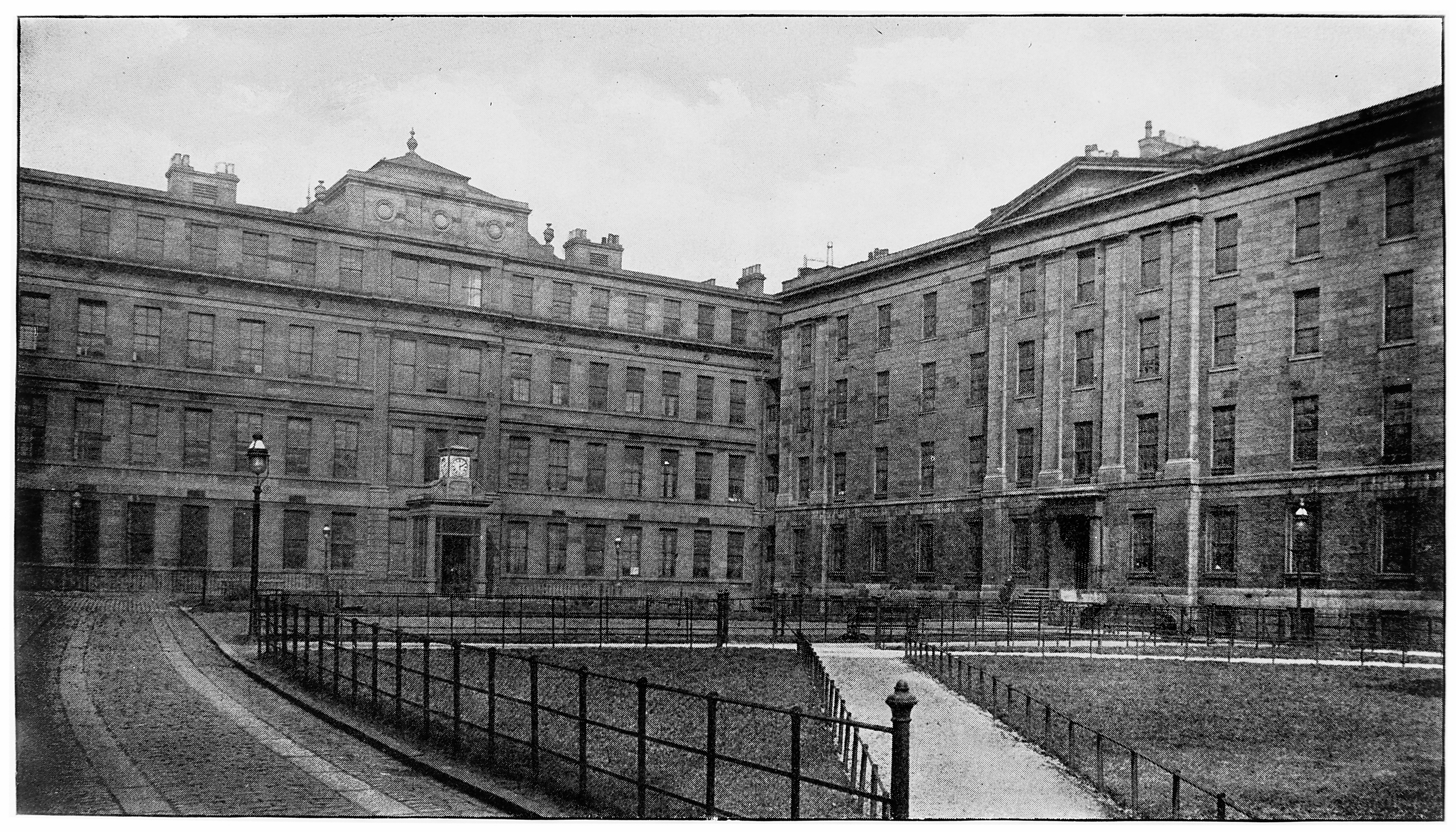
The surgical house

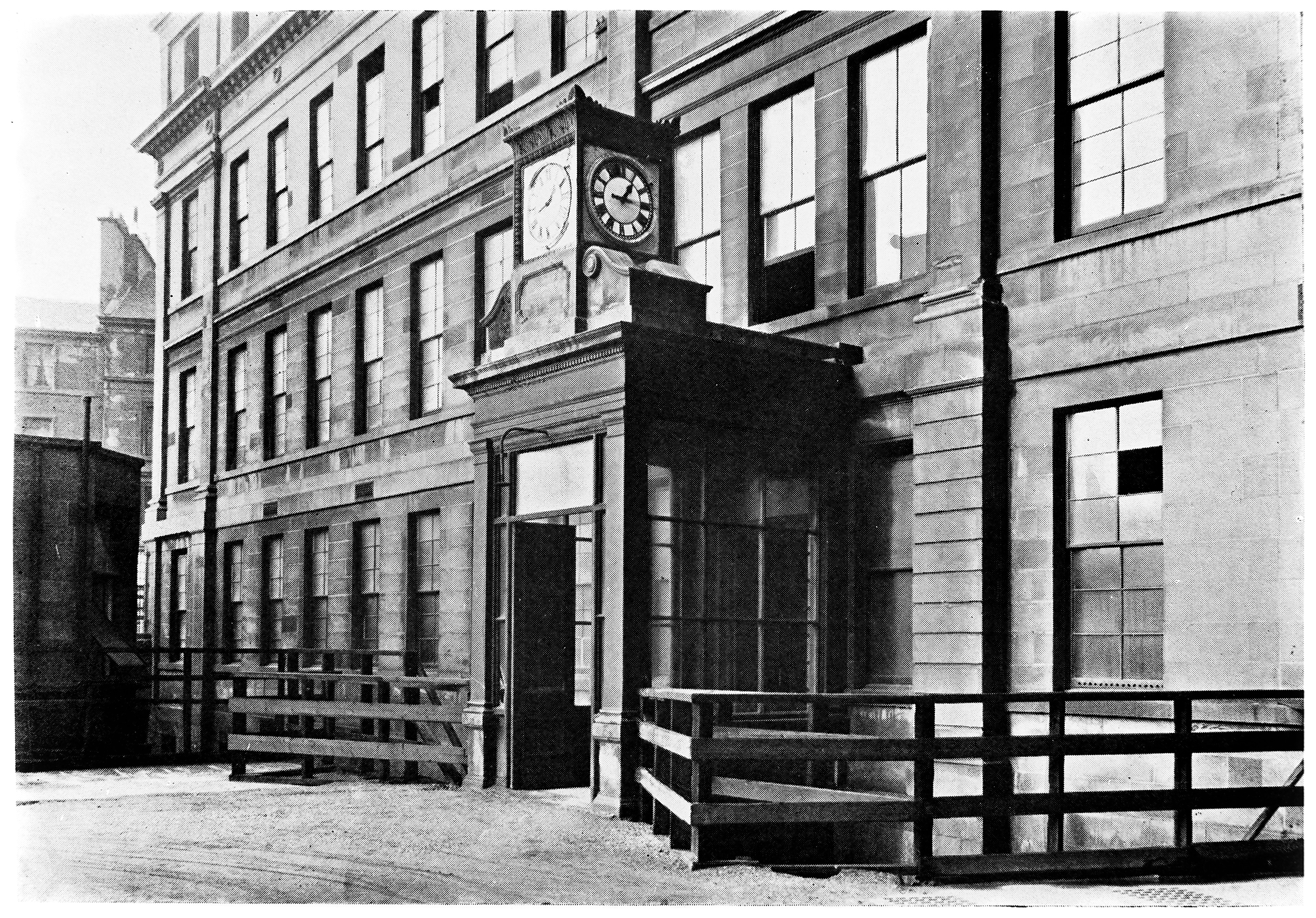
Entrance to male ward 24

In August 1860, Lister was visited by his parents, who took a "saloon" carriage on the Great Northern Railway. In September 1860, Marcus Beck came to live with the Listers and their two servants, while he studied medicine at the university. In the closing weeks of the summer, the Listers with Beck, Lucy Syme and Ramsay went on a short holiday to Balloch, Loch Lomond. While the group was visiting Tarbet, Argyll, the men rowed across the loch and ascended Ben Lomond.

=== Election to surgeoncy ===
In August 1860, Lister had been rejected for a post at the Royal Infirmary by David Smith, a shoemaker who was the chairman of the hospital board. When Lister put his case to Smith explaining the need for anatomical demonstrations so the students could understand the practice of surgery, Smith stated his belief that "the infirmary was a curative institution, not an educational one". The rejection both annoyed and surprised Lister as he had been promised by Thomson that the position was assured. Indeed, he had informed his father of the fact that the post was guaranteed in his letter to his father.

In November 1860, the winter lecture course began. In total, 182 students registered for the lectures and according to Godlee it was likely the "largest class of systematic surgery in Great Britain, if not in Europe". The class consisting of mostly 4th year students with some 3rd and 2nd year students, was so enthused, that they decided to make Lister the Honorary President of their Medical Society. When the time approached for the election to the surgeoncy in 1861, 161 students signed a petition on parchment supporting his claim for election. Lister was not elected until 5 August 1861, in what was described by Beck as a "troublesome canvas". Lister was put in charge of wards XXIV (24) and XXV (25) in October 1861. It was not until November 1861 that he performed his first public operation. Soon after Lister arrived at the GRI, a new surgical block was built and it was here that he conducted many of his trials of antisepsis.

=== Holmes System of Surgery ===
Between the end of his winter lecture course and his appointment, Lister's correspondence contained little of scientific interest. A letter to his father dated 2 August 1861 explained why. He had halted his experiments on coagulation to work on two chapters, "Amputation" and "On Æsthetics" (On anaesthetics) for the medical reference work System of Surgery by Timothy Holmes, published in four volumes in 1862. Chloroform was Lister's preferred anaesthetic. He wrote three papers for Holmes in 1861, 1870 and 1882. The science of anaesthesia was in its infancy when Lister first recommended chloroform to Syme in 1855, and he continued to use it until the 1880s. His sister Isabella Sophie first described it to him in 1848 when she had a tooth pulled. He had also used it without complications on three patients with tumours of the jaw in 1854. He classed it along with alcohol and opium as a "specific irritant" in "On the early stages of imflammation". Lister preferred it to ether, as it was safer to use in artificial light, protected the heart and blood vessels, and, Lister believed, gave the patient "mental tranquility" as it was the safest. In the 1871 edition, he reported that there had been no deaths in the Edinburgh or Glasgow infirmaries from chloroform, between 1861 and 1870. Lister described how his assistant applied the chloroform onto a simple handkerchief used as a mask and watched the patient's breathing. In 1870, however, Lister updated the chapter to state that he felt apprehension about using chloroform on the "aged and infirm". In the same edition he recommended nitrous oxide for tooth extraction and the use of ether to avoid vomiting after abdominal surgery. In the winter of 1873, the English medical journals reported that sulphuric ether should be used instead but Watson Cheyne stated there had been no deaths from chloroform during the winter of 1873. In 1880, the British Medical Association recommended the synthetic gas ethidene dichloride for clinical trials. On 14 November 1881, Paul Bert published the dose-response curve of chloroform but Lister believed that smaller doses were sufficient to anaesthetise the patient. Starting in April 1882, Lister first conducted clinical research using ether and from July to November, lab experiments on chaffinches and then on himself and Agnes, to determine the correct dose. The 1882 chapter continued to recommend chloroform.

The chapter on amputation was much more technical than the anaesthesia chapter, for example describing the ways of cutting the skin to produce flaps to close over the wound. (Note: The article as it appears in the Collected Papers is reprinted from the third edition published in 1883) In the first edition, Lister examined the history of amputation from Hippocrates to Thomas Pridgin Teale, William Hey, François Chopart, Nikolay Pirogov and Dominique Jean Larrey and the discovery of the tourniquet by Etienne Morel. In the first edition, Lister devoted seven pages to dressings, but by the third edition used only a single sentence to recommend a dry dressing as opposed to the more common water dressing. (Note: A dressing made of lint cloth that is wetted and covered with oiled-silk or gutta-perchathat was thought to exclude air.)

By the third edition, Lister focused on describing three innovative surgical techniques. The first was a method for amputation through the thigh that he developed between 1858 and 1860, a modification of Henry Douglas Carden's technique for knee amputation. The thigh amputation went through the femoral condyles in a circular fashion with a small posterior flap that enabled a neat scar. The second technique was an aortic tourniquet for controlling blood flow in the abdominal aorta. The vessels of the aorta were too tough to close properly and ligatures either damaged the artery walls or caused premature death if left in too long. The third technique was a method of bloodless operation that he created in 1863–1864 by elevating a limb and quickly applying an india rubber tourniquet to stop limb circulation. It became unnecessary with the use of the Esmarch bandage. In 1859, he advocated for the use of silver wire sutures that had been invented by J. Marion Sims, but their use fell out of favour with the introduction of antiseptics.

=== Croonian Lecture ===
On 1 January 1863, Lister returned to the topic of coagulation with the Croonian Lecture titled "On the coagulation of the blood", although it contained little that was new. The lecture, given in London at the invitation of the Royal Society and the Royal College of Physicians, began by reconfirming the fallacious nature of the ammonia theory, instead proposing that shed blood coagulates when the solid and fluid elements of the blood meet. His experiments had confirmed that blood plasma (liquor sanguinis) alone does not coagulate, but does when in contact with red blood cells. Lister suggested that living tissues possessed similar properties in relation to blood coagulation. He mentioned the presence of coagulable fluid in the interstices of cellular tissue and described instances of oedema liquid coagulating after emission, possibly due to a slight admixture of red blood cells. Lister highlighted the tendency of inflamed tissues to induce coagulation in their vicinity, suggesting that inflamed tissues temporarily lose their vital properties and behave like ordinary solids, leading to coagulation. He provided examples of inflamed arteries and veins exhibiting coagulation on their interior, like artificially deprived vessels. Lister then noted that inflamed tissues induce coagulation and oedema effusions remain liquid. He hypothesised that the accumulated red blood cells increased pressure in inflamed capillaries and contributed to the loss of healthy condition in capillary walls, leading to coagulation. In closing, Lister said his previous microscopic investigation published in the Philosophical Transactions, supported the view that tissues could be temporarily deprived of vital power by irritants. He proposed that inflammatory congestion arose from the adhesiveness of red blood cells to irritated tissues, like their behaviour outside the body when encountering ordinary solids. In finishing the lecture, Lister said he was satisfied that his previous conclusions on the nature of inflammation were independently confirmed through his research into blood coagulation.

=== On excision of the wrist for caries ===
Lister's most original work that he undertook during 1863 and the beginning of 1864 was the development of a surgical technique for the excision of caries from the wrist, i.e., the removal of diseased bone due to tuberculosis. The procedure consisted of removing the ends of the bones entering into an articulation instead of amputating the whole limb, and was considered a recent development in "conservative surgery". Several surgeons had attempted the procedure. It was first performed by German surgeons Johann von Dietz in 1839 and Johann Ferdinand Heyfelder in 1849, followed by British surgeon William Fergusson in 1851. While the development of techniques for excision of the elbow was largely successful, similar success for the excision of the wrist was elusive, so amputation was still considered the most appropriate treatment even in 1860. Lister developed a complicated technique that removed the tissue where the disease was likely to occur but preserved the structures used to move the fingers and wrist. The technique was adopted by the profession and the only complaint from surgeons was the length of the operation at 90 minutes. Lister waited almost a year before publishing the paper in March 1865 in The Lancet. The paper presented 15 case histories. Of these, ten people were cured, two had hopes of achieving a cure, two died of causes independent of the operation and Lister considered one operation unsatisfactory, a failure rate of 13%.

=== Edinburgh position ===
Professor of Systematic Surgery in Edinburgh James Miller died in June 1864. The Edinburgh chair, considered the most prestigious within the Scottish medical community, came with an annual stipend of £700-£800 per year. Syme and his friends suggested that Lister should apply as his candidature was all but assured. A number of reasons have been advanced for why Lister applied. In a letter to his father, he said that he saw Glasgow as a stepping stone. There were a multitude of reasons to either stay or go. He was drawn to research, his friends were there, and he found the routine tasks in Glasgow to be "working in a corner". There was also the fact that his tenure only lasted 10 years. Testimonials from Christison, Paget, Buchanan and Syme followed the application. By the end of June, Lister was convinced the position was his. However, the chair went with James Spence instead. Lister was disappointed and in social settings tended to solipsism in conversation, but by October his father, in a letter said that it was, "very gratifying to learn thy complete reconcilement to remaining at Glasgow".

Before he received the disappointing news, Lister had been called back to Upton as his mother Isabella was on her deathbed. She died on 3 September 1864. His father now lived alone at Upton as the only daughter left at home had married in 1858. Communication with his children became of paramount importance to Joseph Jackson and he started to send Lister a letter every week, stating in October "The thought that thou wilt look for letters from thee weekly, and the letters when they come, are alike gratifying to thy poor father."

Winter lecture course

On 1 November, Lister began the winter lecture course, divided in two: common tissue and organ conditions, and conditions of physiology. His first lectures were on blood, then nerves, then detailed special nerves which explained the process of inflammation. In introducing the subject, he stated that any injury that did not cause death would result in inflammation with the familiar symptoms of redness, swelling and pain. These symptoms indicated "inflammatory congestion", the suspension of vital energy, beginning with red corpuscles adhering together, which was caused by fibrin, which itself was caused by two substances in the blood, one in the blood cells and one in liquor sanguis (plasma). He described two types of inflammation, direct and indirect. He saw direct inflammation as caused by a noxious agent and indirect by "sympathy", an indication that his frame of reference was wholly inadequate. He then provided various examples and examined various types of inflammation such as acute, latent and chronic. The following lectures explained how to alleviate the symptoms of inflammation, by for example elevating a limb to enable blood flow, or reducing tension by draining an abscess. The remarkable aspect of Lister's theory of inflammation was that while the details of his observations were correct, his theoretical structure to explain his observations was completely wrong. Lister's error lay in his belief that inflammation was a "unitary disease", a single underlying disease, when in effect it was a range of conditions. The second division of the lectures focused on the heart, blood vessels, lymphatic system, bones, joints and nerves.

On 13 November 1864, Lister introduced a small instrument to remove foreign bodies from the ear, initially used to remove an iron bead from the ear of a little girl. In the same year, he improved on the technique for fixing Urethral stricture, a surgical procedure last improved upon by Syme. This was the first of three procedures to the improvement of strictures.

Christmas

Lister and Agnes spent Christmas 1864 with Joseph Jackson at Upton. In January, Lister attended a quite unusual operation by Syme in Edinburgh in which a patient's tongue was removed. A month later, Lister received an interesting letter from Jackson on fees that indicated Lister's growing private practice that he began in 1861. His practice was unusual, as it was solely dedicated to surgery, during a period when operations either took place at the doctor's surgery or at the patient's home. In March 1865, Lister and his colleagues became involved in the case of the murderer Edward William Pritchard who was employed as a doctor in Glasgow. Prichard had broken his oath. In a letter to his father, Lister expressed his sincere hope that he would be hung.

=== Pasteur ===
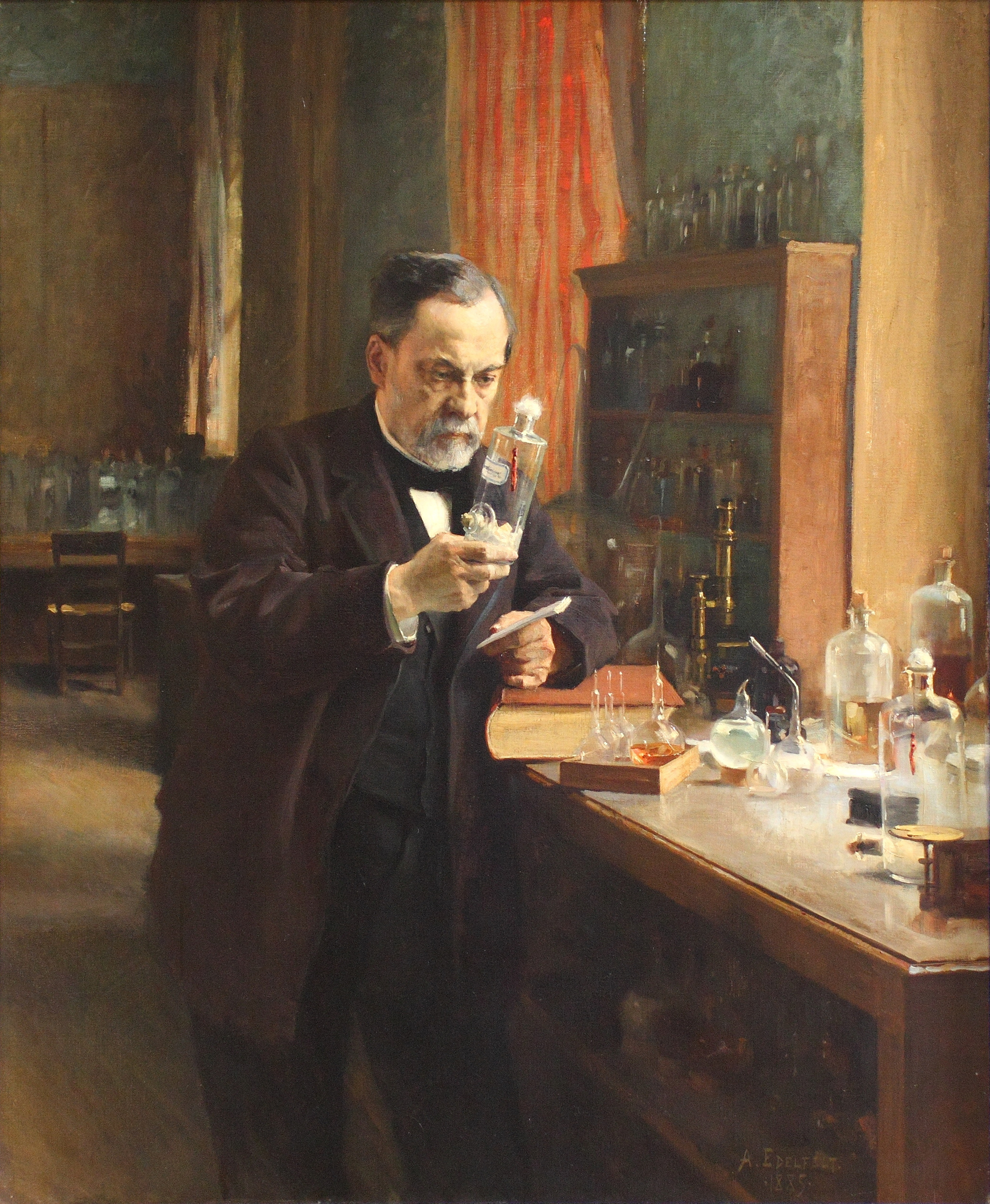
Louis Pasteur in his laboratory. Painting by Albert Edelfelt in 1885

At the end of 1864 or during the spring of 1865 (sources vary) while walking home with Thomas Anderson, the chemistry professor at Glasgow, they discussed putrefaction. Anderson drew Lister's attention to the latest research of the French chemist Louis Pasteur, who had discovered living things that caused fermentation and putrefaction. Lister had not been a wide reader of continental literature, but began reading the weekly journal Comptes rendus hebdomadaires of the French Academy of Sciences in the years 1860–1863, in which Pasteur discussed fermentation and putrefaction.

The two papers that Anderson recommended to Lister were Sur les corpuscules organisés qui existent dans l'atmosphère, examen de la doctrine des générations spontanées (1861) ("On the organised particles that exist in the atmosphere, examination of the doctrine of spontaneous generations"). In this paper, Pasteur disproved the theory of spontaneous generation by showing that life in boiled infusions arose from spores. He also proved that particles in the air could be cultivated; and that if they were introduced from the air into a sterile liquid, they would reappear and multiply in the liquid. The second paper was Pasteur's magnum opus, titled Examen du rôle attribué au gaz oxygène atmosphérique dans la destruction des matières animales et végétales après la mort ("Examination of the role attributed to atmospheric oxygen gas in the destruction of animal and plant matter after death"), published 29 June 1863. The paper concluded that fermentation, putrefaction, and slow combustion destroyed organic matter and that these were necessary processes for life to exist. Pasteur learned that slow combustion was related to the anaerobic conditions when microorganisms were present.

Several other papers would directly influence Lister's work on microorganisms. The third paper was Mémoire sur la fermentation appelée lactique (Extrait par l'auteur) ("Memoir on the so-called lactic acid fermentation (Extracted by the author)"), published in 1857, which described the discovery of the microbe responsible for fermentation in beer yeast. The fourth paper was Memoire sur la Fermentation Alcoolique ("Memoir on Alcoholic Fermentation"), published in Annales de chimie et de physique in 1860. Pasteur described living microorganisms in yeast, Saccharomyces cerevisiae, that were responsible for the effervescent change that led to fermentation. The last paper by Pasteur was Animalcules infusoires vivant sans gaz oxygène libre et déterminant des fermentations ("Animal Infusoria Living in the Absence of Free Oxygen and their fermentations"). That paper, presented in 1861, was seminal in enabling Lister to understand the nature of sepsis, where the body's response to infections leads to injury of the tissue and organs. Pasteur's research led him to believe the ferment that produced Butyric acid was a microbe that lived in the absence of oxygen. The last paper that Lister found important was "Recherches sur la putréfaction" ("Research on putrefaction"), which concluded that "...that putrefecation is determined by living ferments".

Lister was not the only surgeon interested in Pasteur's research. Thomas Spencer Wells, surgeon to Queen Victoria, had emphasised the significance of Pasteur's work at a meeting of the British Medical Association in 1864, stating "[By] applying the knowledge for which we are indebted to Pasteur of the presence in the atmosphere of organic germs ... it is easy to understand that some germs find their most appropriate nutriment in the secretions from wounds, or in pus, and that they so modify it as to convert it into a poison when absorbed". However, Wells did not have an experiment to demonstrate germ theory and was unable to develop the techniques to put it into practice.

Lister's colleagues

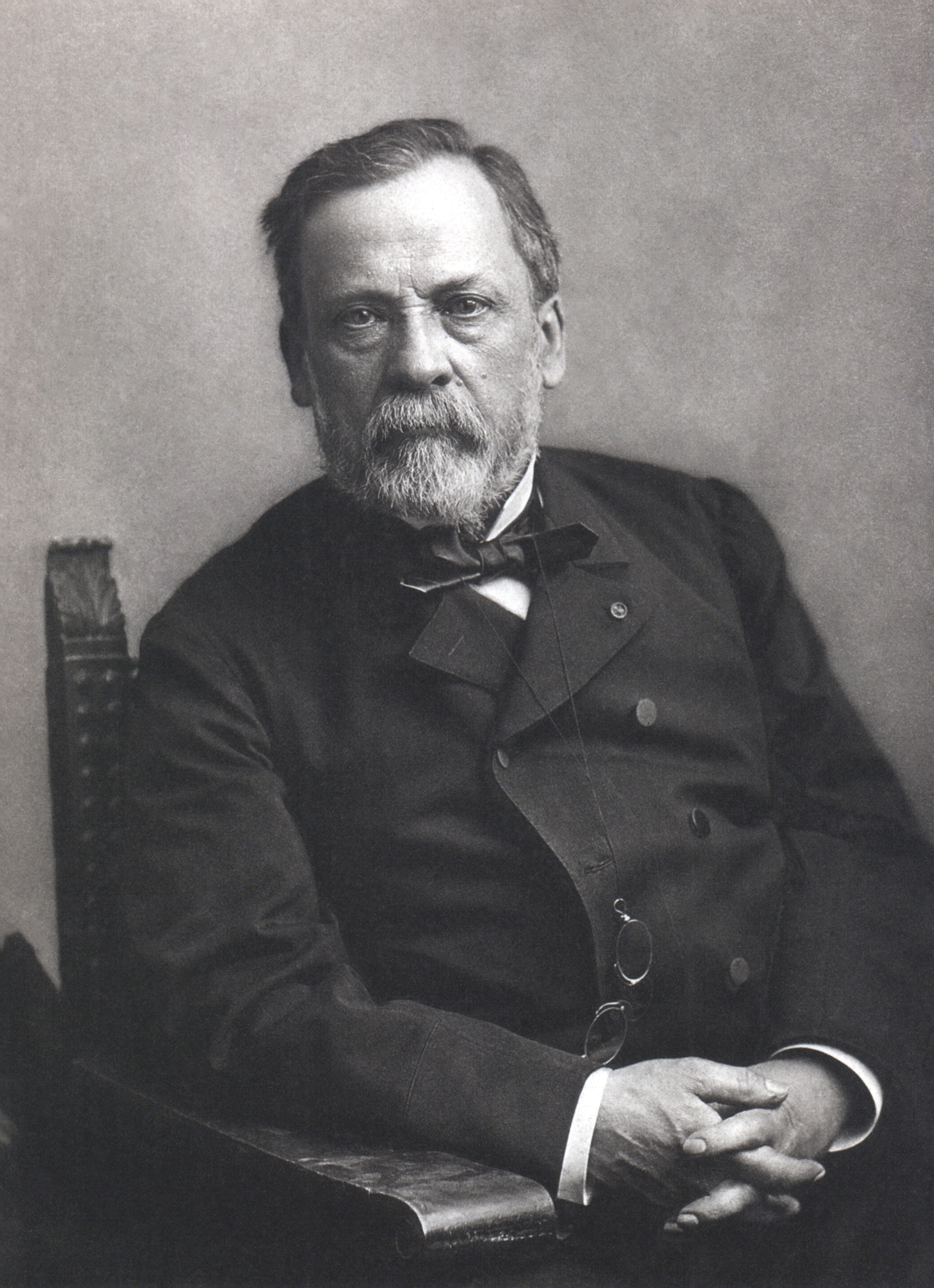
Louis Pasteur before 1895

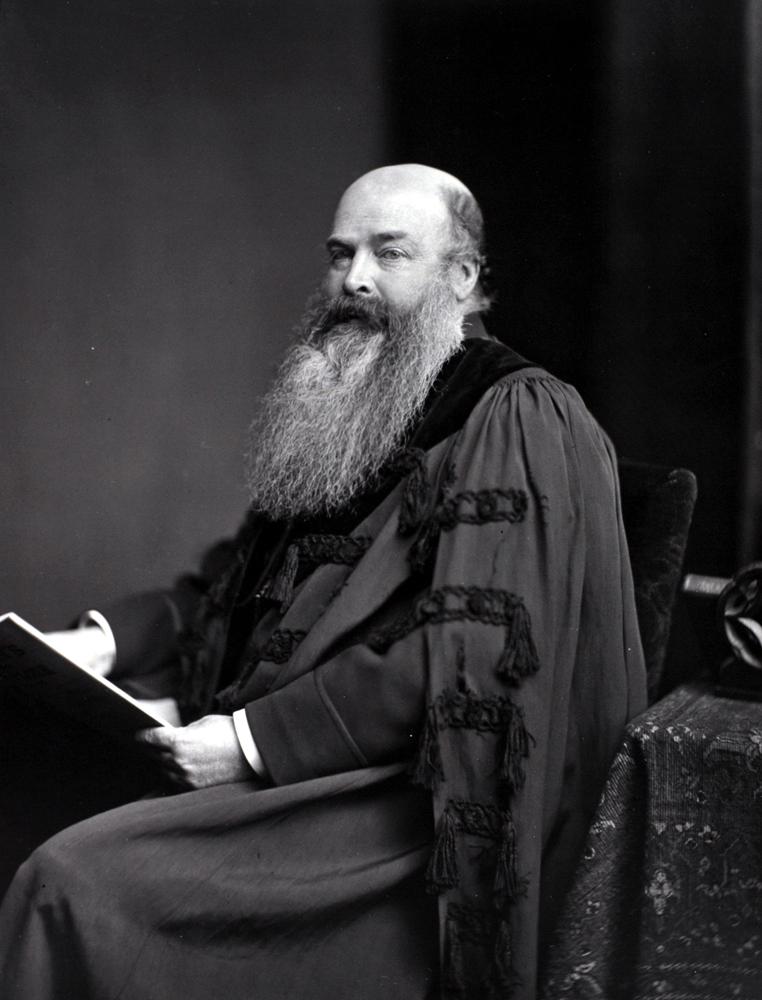
Thomas Anderson c. 1870

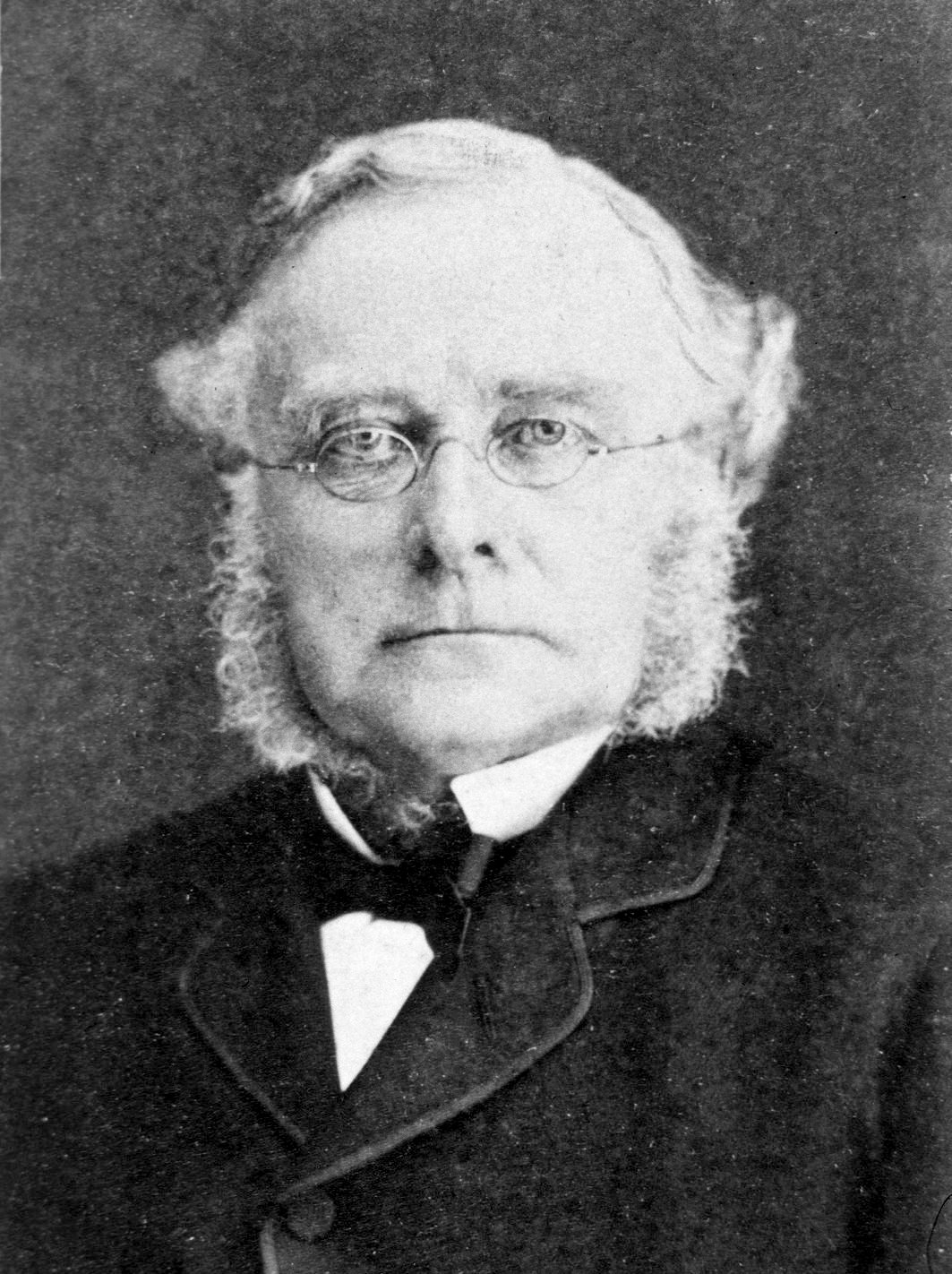
Thomas Spencer Wells

=== Discovery ===
The serendipitous discovery of Pasteur's work at a time when he was struggling to control post-surgical infections provided a simple explanation for a problem he had long experienced. He was now convinced that infection and suppuration of wounds must be due to entry into the wound of minute living airborne creatures. He recognised that contamination was the vector for infection, realising from the first that the surgeon's hands, dressings and instruments would also be contaminated. However, Pasteur's work confirmed the view Lister had always expressed that contamination came from the air. Lister did not realise the vast and diverse amount of microbial life. As Lister's work at that time derived directly from Pasteur's, Lister probably thought that wound infection was due to a single organism. He had no concept, nor indeed did anybody else, of the vast number of types of germs. Reading the papers did spur him to determine how the hands, dressings and instruments he used could be rid of these ubiquitous organisms and how the wound could be cleared of them.

Pasteur suggested three methods to eliminate microorganisms: filtration, exposure to heat, or exposure to chemical solutions. Lister was particularly interested in the efficacy of filtration and repeated many of Pasteur's experiments in modified form for instruction in his class, but eventually excluded the first two techniques as not applicable for the treatment of wounds.

Lister confirmed Pasteur's conclusions with his own experiments and decided to use his findings to develop antiseptic techniques for wounds. In the early months of 1865, he began looking for the most convenient form of antiseptics that could prevent germs from entering the wound. The first of these he tried was Condy's Fluid, a common household disinfectant and a strong oxidising agent, but the patient's limb began to suppurate. He went on to examine a huge range of compounds including Zinc chloride, Salicylic acid, Thymol, Iodine, Mercury cyanide and Zinc cyanide but none were suitable.

=== Carbolic acid ===
In 1834, Friedlieb Ferdinand Runge discovered the germicide phenol, then known as carbolic acid, which he derived in an impure form from coal tar. At that time, there was uncertainty as to the relationship of creosote – a chemical that had been used as a preservative on the wood used for railway sleeper and ships to protect the wood from rotting – and carbolic acid. Upon hearing that creosote had been used for treating sewage in Carlisle, Lister obtained a sample from Anderson. Known as "German creosote", it was a thick, smelly tarry substance.

=== Antiseptic system 1865–1867 ===
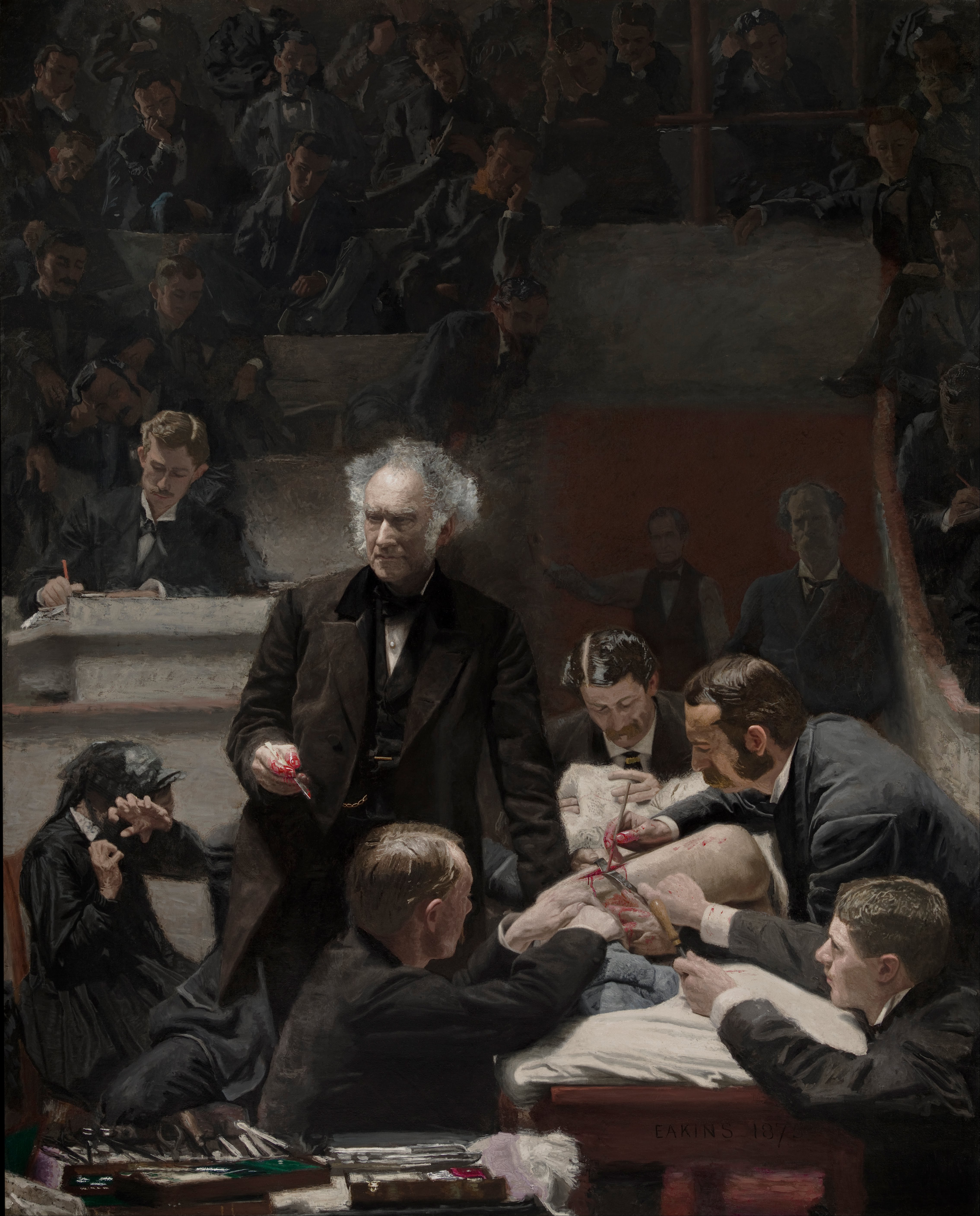
The Portrait of Dr. Samuel D. Gross. The portrait of American surgeon Samuel Gross at work created by Thomas Eakins in 1875. Gross rejected Lister's methodology when Lister visited the International Medical Congress in Philadelphia in 1876. Gross is quoted as saying: "Little if any faith is placed by any enlightened or experienced surgeon on this side of the Atlantic in the so-called carbolic acid treatment of Professor Lister". Examination of the portrait reveals that the assistant is holding the surgical instrument by the blade instead of the handle, delivering germs directly into the wound. The assistants have dirt on their hands, and a family member is present at the operation, bringing more germs into the operation.

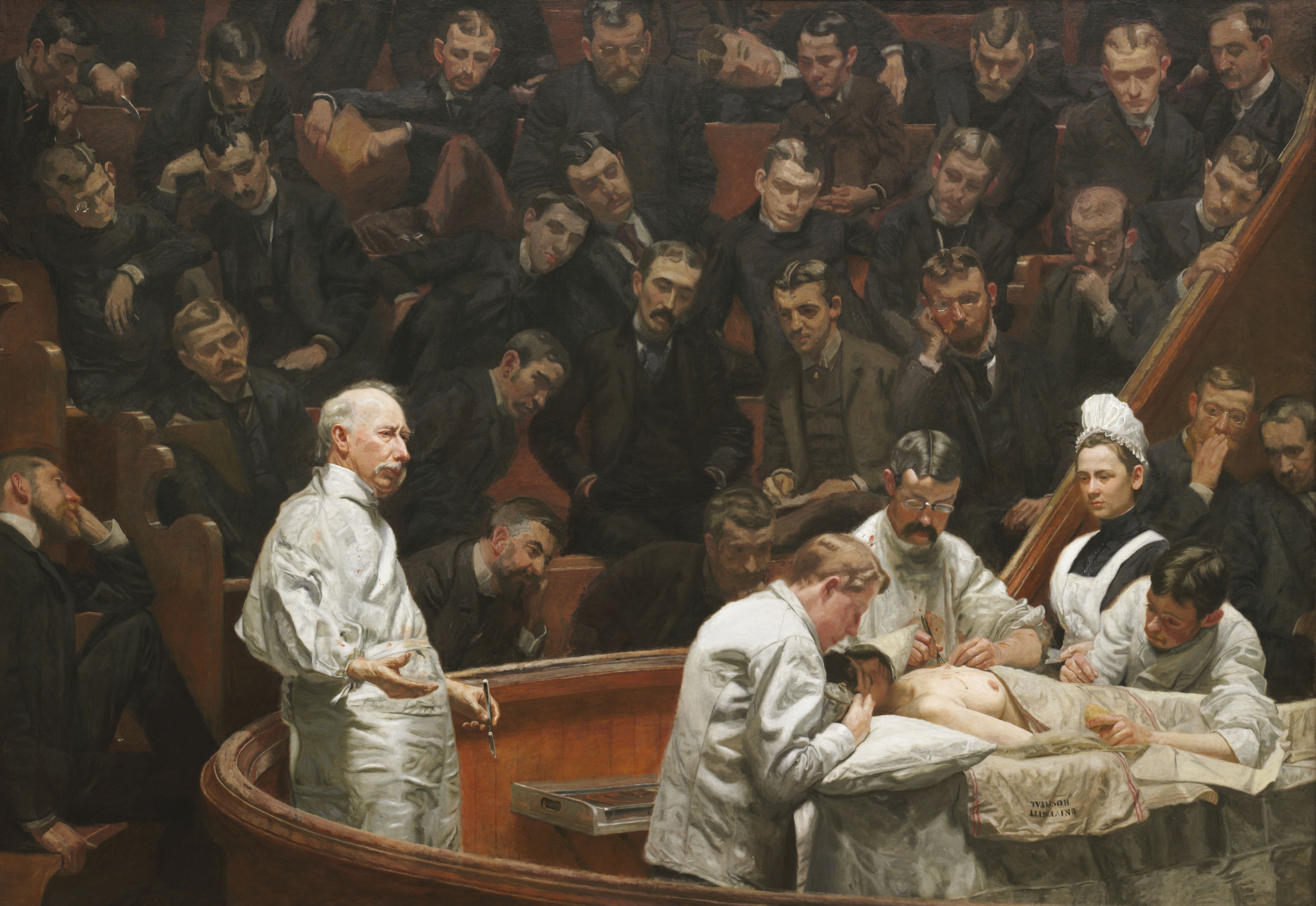
The Agnew Clinic by Thomas Eakins in 1889. It details an operation by David Hayes Agnew, professor of surgery who was on the point of retiring, to the students of University of Pennsylvania School of Medicine. Examination of the portrait shows that the surgeons are now wearing surgical dress, the use of surgical drapes over the body is predominant and a nurse is present as it is an operation on a woman. Lister's work elicited a worldwide revolution in surgery in less than 25 years.

==== History ====
===== Hospitalism =====
The history of antiseptic surgery in the years before 1847, was preventing or treating infection in accidental wounds, often received in battle.

===== 1860's surgery and pathological theory =====
In the 1860s, Lister's assumptions about surgery and theory of pathology were similar to those of his contemporaries.

==== Early experiments ====
In early March 1865, Lister conducted his first experiment using the acid on a patient whose wrist was being excised due to caries. Although he carefully washed the wound, it became infected and the experiment was a failure.

On 21 March 1865, Lister began his second experiment with carbolic acid on a 22-year-old patient named Neil Kelly who had a severe compound fracture of the leg. His treatment consisted of cleaning the wound of all blood clots. Then a piece of calico or lint soaked in undiluted carbolic acid (phenol) was used to swab the whole wound using forceps. Two pieces of lint impregnated in the undiluted acid was then laid on the leg, overlapping the wound and fixed by an adhesive plaster. A thin metal sheet made of block tin or lead, moulded to the shape of the wound and sterilised by the acid was placed over the lint, to prevent the antiseptic from evaporating. This was fixed with adhesive plaster and packing was used between the limb and the splints to soak up blood or discharges during 1 or 2 days. A crust formed consisting of blood and the acid that was not removed except to apply a new antiseptic. Once a day, the cap was removed and the crust painted with carbolic acid. Lister tried to ensure the crust didn't become sceptic and at the same time was looking for the surface closest to the wound to experience effluxion of the phenol, resulting in the wound healing. He was essentially seeking "healing by scabbing" without suppuration.

While the treatment possessed many of the essential characteristics of the antiseptic dressings that Lister would subsequently introduce, it failed and suppuration began to occur, leading to the death of the patient. Lister blamed himself and noted that the treatment "..proved unsuccessful, in consequence, as I now believe, of improper management".

==== Antiseptic treatment and dressings ====
The essential part of the wound treatment was not the application of strong carbolic acid to the wound, although that required careful management to ensure the wound was sterilised, but designing the dressing in such a manner to stop the ingress of airborne infection. This was often misunderstood, even when he was explaining the procedure to fellow doctors at Glasgow who were celebrating him as humanity's benefactor, and it caused him considerable irritation and unhappiness later in life. They were confused by the initial application of the acid and this led to the claim that Lister was advocating for the use of carbolic acid to prevent suppuration.

The disadvantages of the first primitive dressings of lint soaked in carbolic acid were soon apparent. The German creosote was also far from ideal, as it irritated the skin, causing ulceration and then suppuration that occasionally resulted in tissue necrosis. It was also almost insoluble in water. Lister began to look for another source of phenol. Lister discovered (Note: Likely from Anderson) that Frederick Crace Calvert, an honorary chemistry professor from the Royal Manchester Institution was manufacturing small quantities of phenol at a much finer purity and managed to obtain some. The phenol was in the form of small white crystals which liquified at 80 °F (27 °C) and were readily soluble in a ratio of 1:20 parts of water and to any extent soluble in oil. The watery solution could be used in a lotion of any strength and be used for disinfection of wounds while the solution in oil that served as a reservoir of antiseptic seemed likely to provide a suitable dressing. Lister began to experiment with the phenol and produced a new dressing made of a putty that consisted of carbonate of lime mixed with phenol mixed with boiled linseed oil in a ratio of 1:4 or 1:6. A piece of calico soaked in the acid was placed on the wound. The putty, spread onto a piece calico to a depth of 6mm was the next layer. The putty-based dressing was changed daily while the lower layer of the dressing was left undisturbed. The lower dressing would dry out and when removed, the wound had either become scarred or a granulating sore.

After two failures, Lister had no clear experimental design to test the efficacy of carbolic acid. At that point he decided to only experiment on patients with compound fractures, i.e. open wounds where the fractured bone breaks through the skin, leading to extensive loss of blood. In 1865, industrial accidents often led to the patient being thrown to the ground, leading to dirt entering the wound and a risk of deep infection. By the time the patient saw a surgeon several hours later, suppuration had invariably set in. In 1865, amputation was the standard treatment for compound fractures. Lister reasoned that he could experiment on the patient and if the treatment failed, perform the amputation to remove the limb and save the patient's life. He believed this experimental model was both ethically and medically ideal.

==== James Greenlees ====
On 12 August 1865, Lister achieved success for the first time when he used the crude oily full-strength carbolic acid to disinfect a compound fracture. He applied a piece of lint dipped in carbolic acid solution onto the wound of an 11-year-old boy, James Greenlees, who had sustained a compound fracture after a cart wheel passed over his left leg. After washing the wound with carbolic acid dissolved in linseed oil, he applied a dressing of putty mixed with the acid widely over the wound and placed a sheet of tin to cover the wound and protect it. The putty ensured that the acid did not wash out of the wound in blood or lymph fluid. He splinted the leg and bandaged it to hold the lot in place. After four days, he renewed the pad and discovered that no infection had developed. He again dressed it and left it for five days. When he removed the second dressing, he found the skin around the wound was burnt and applied a dressing of gauze soaked in a combination of 5% to 10% acid and olive oil for a further four days. He then applied a water dressing to the wound until it completely healed. After slightly over six weeks, Lister discovered that the boy's bones had fused back together without suppuration. Confident that carbolic acid was the antiseptic that he had been looking for, Lister treated patient after patient at the Royal Infimary in the following months, improving both the wound dressing design and the operating treatment.

During the summer, the Listers never strayed far from Glasgow as he was still monitoring Greenlees. In the same month, he treated two ulcers. Both sores were washed with an acid in oil solution and one was covered with an oiled paper coated with spirit varnish and the second with gutta-percha covered with a water dressing. In both cases the dressing failed and he swapped them for a water dressing covered with cotton. On 11 September 1865, Lister treated the second patient with the acid, Patrick F., a labourer with a compound fracture of the thigh. After the thigh was splinted, the small wound was dressed using lint dipped in carbolic acid and covered in oil paper. After 16 days, the patient had an excellent prognosis. On 22 September, the Listers decided to take a short holiday to Upton and the patient was left with his house surgeon, John Macfee. However, the treatment failed and the limb was amputated after gangrene developed in the wound. When he wrote up his seminal paper, Lister considered the wound size too small to have effectively tested the efficacy of the acid, but he was happy with the outcome. At Christmas 1865, the Lister joined the Symes in Edinburgh. It was eight months before Lister treated another compound fracture. On 22 January 1866, he treated John Austin, a shipwreck survivor with a wound in the leg that had developed into an ulcer. He washed the wound in 20:1 oil-to-acid solution and dressed it with a lint bandage dipped in the solution covered with plaster of paris.

==== Improved dressing ====
On 19 May 1866, the first patient to use the improved method presented at Lister's accident ward with a compound fracture with extensive swelling and bruising. The patient was John Hainy, a 21-year-old casting moulder in an iron foundry, who had been supervising a crane when a chain broke and a metal box, containing a sand mould weighing 12 hundredweight or 1,344 pounds (609.6 kg), fell from a height of four feet and landed obliquely on his left leg. Both leg bones were broken and a wound measuring 1.5 by 0.75 inches (38 by 19 mm) had bled profusely into the muscles and tissue of the leg. A secondary complication had occurred when air bubbles had mixed with the blood when the man was moved to the hospital. The normal treatment would have been amputation, but Lister decided to treat the wound with phenol. He squeezed the leg to remove as much air and blood as possible, then placed a piece of lint soaked in carbolic acid on the wound and covered it with tin foil. A bloody crust formed over the wound, consisting of a scab free of bacteria. Lister saw for the first time how the scab was gradually converted into living tissue, even when new carbolic acid was being applied - something entirely new. Unfortunately Hainy developed bed sores that became gangrenous. These were treated with nitric acid to remove the necrotic flesh and carbolic acid to sterilise the wounds. Hainy survived the injury. On 27 May, Lister wrote to his father expressing intense satisfaction, stating "I tried the application of carbolic acid to the wound, to prevent decomposition of the blood and to prevent the fearful mischief of suppuration. It is now eight days since the accident and patient has been going exactly as though the fracture were a simple one." Two weeks later another letter followed, reporting "The great swelling has almost entirely subsided, and the limb is becoming firm". On 11 June, he wrote a further letter to his father where he describes compound fractures as "no longer a case of uncertainty" and his decision to publish the results. (Note: Lister's original letter to his father of 11 June 1866 is printed in full in Cameron 1949.) On 7 August 1866, Hainy was released from hospital.

==== Abscess treatment ====
On 7 November 1866, Lister began using his technique on abscesses, when he successfully treated 12-year old millworker Mary Phillips. On 17 March 1867, he treated a 5-year-old boy who had a disease of the spine that had developed a large abscess between the umbilicus to the middle of the thigh. Known as psoas abscesses, they were often as result of complication from tuberculosis, where pus collects in the muscles within the abdominable cavity. They tended to grow large but the relationship between underlying infection in the bone caused by the tuberculosis and the abscess was not understood. The treatment he developed consisted of draining the abscess, placing a piece of lint soaked with carbolic acid in the incision and applying a dressing consisting of layer of the putty then covered with tinfoil. The dressing was changed daily with the lint left in place. Eventually the lint was removed after several days, leaving a scar. In a letter to his father he stated "...cases of abscess treated in this way is so beautifully in harmony with the theory of the whole subject of suppuration, and besides the treatment is now rendered so simple and easy for any one to put in practice, that it really charms me".

==== Medical discourse ====
During his life, Lister never wrote any books and was exhausted by the process of writing. He considered the meaning of each individual word, which would have meant writing a book both extremely time-consuming and a burden. An example of Lister's poor communication was placing the reason for his antiseptic treatment at the end of the first antiseptic paper, instead of in the first paper. Foremost amongst his biographers to examine Lister's writing skills was Joseph Fisher, who pointed to his flatness of expression and his inability to state the obvious, i.e. that he was seeking to prevent putrefaction. Fisher wondered if it was simple "stylistic ham-handedness", a statement examined by Connor and Connor in 2008. Lister used the Greek word antiseptic to describe his new technique. This 1752 term was widely known in the medical community and meant cleaning the wound of dead flesh with an antiseptic fluid. Lister's use resulted in confusion for his readers and slowed the adoption of the new technique. In 2000, medical historian Michael Worboys stated that his surgical contemporaries reported that "translating his words into action" was difficult. Connor and Connor analysed Lister's public and private written and spoken communication to determine if this was true. They concluded that Lister was not bad at writing and this was seen in his private letters to his father, describing the textual content as "clear, concise, informative and concrete". Although Lister understood the need to remain neutral and objective in his public communication, he struggled to find a suitable ethos that would clearly convey his ideas and that resulted in his writing sounding awkward and unnatural. Sir Charles Scott Sherrington attributed Lister's "sobriety of expression" and "self-restrained statements" to his Quaker faith.

Crowther and Dupree writing on Lister's student cohort in 2007 described some of his essays as "turgid".

===== Performance perspectives =====
In 2013, Worboys revisited Lister's writing, by examing it from three different performance perspectives- antiseptic, surgery and professional. Lister published work in antiseptics was written in two ways. First, Lister used case histories to illustrate the principles and practice of his clinical studies. He published a total of 47 case histories between 1867 and 1877. Occasionally he would publish statistics in a before and after scenario to show how antiseptic treatment benefited a patient but believed that case histories were more instructive. Secondly, he used programmatic statements that described the evolution and benefits of his germ theory. These were plans that described how a particular antiseptic technique should be applied, for example the 1 in 20 carbolic solution, or how to prepare dressings.

=== Elaboration of the antiseptic treatment (1866–1869) ===
In July 1866, while he continued to treat compound fracture cases, he applied for a vacant surgeoncy position at the University College London. It was an attractive position as it came with guaranteed post at University College Hospital. He approached Lord Henry Brougham to prepare a testimonial that included a short description of the antiseptic system, (Note: Lister's letter to Brougham is published in full in Cameron 1949.) which was the first formal description of his work. However, he lost the election. Lister was confident in achieving the position. In a letter to his father on 6 August 1866, he described "The disappointment was at first extremely severe : more so than I had expected". The position went to John Marshall who had been an assistant surgeon for some 18 years.

==== On a new method of treating compound fracture, abscess ====
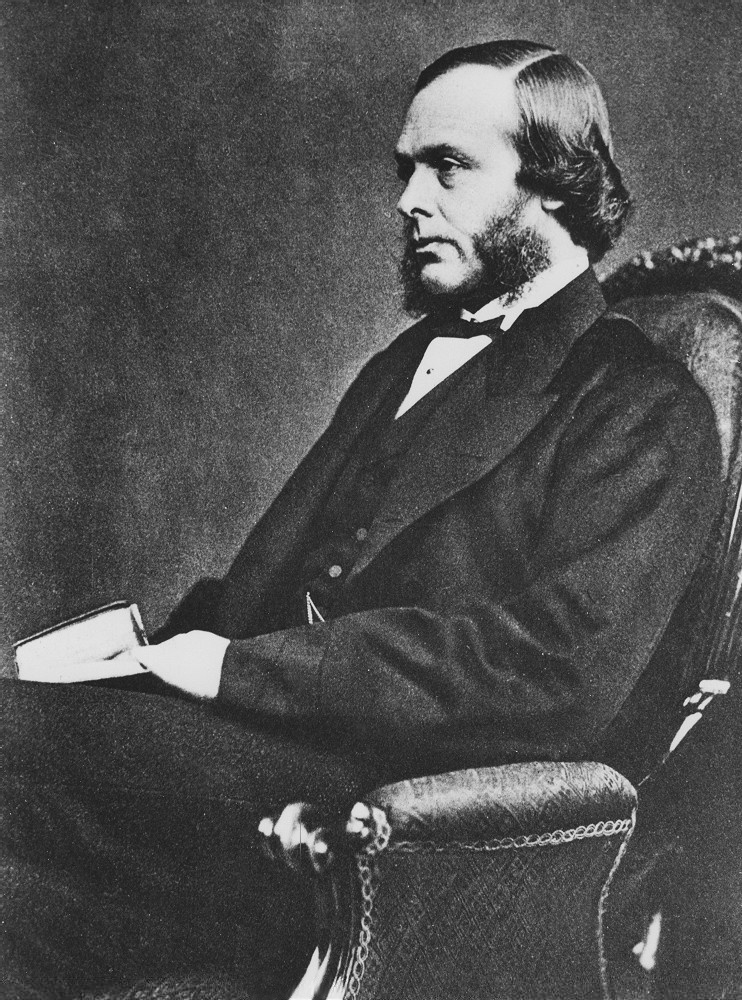
Lister in December 1866. His dour expression, furrows on his face and forehead possibly indicated he was ill.

In early 1867, Lister began writing the compound fracture case histories of his experiments with carbolic acid in a series of papers, the first to describe his new technique of antiseptics. Titled On a New Method of treating Compound Fracture, Abscess, Etc., with Observations on the Conditions of Suppuration. the paper was published in The Lancet in five instalments with the first appearing on 10 March 1867. and the last part on abscesses added in July 1867. The paper was divided into a main section dealing with compound fractures, and a short note on the treatment of abscesses.

Lister's theory of inflammation provided the conceptual structure of the article. He stated that the inflammation that appeared immediately after an injury was both necessary and dangerous. It was a precursor to healing, but the fluids which flowed into the wound were akin to dead tissue. Inflammation could trigger putrefaction. Lister described tissues healing by granulation, which he believed was the likely outcome in wounds in compound fractures. Lister believed that cells of granulated tissue were remarkably active and that since they were alive, they were immune to putrefaction and also to secondary inflammation, as they lacked sensory nerves. Airborne putrefaction, "a danger that was underrated", was proven by the scabs which appeared to protect small wounds as they healed. Lister then explained how often it appeared in less than 24 hours and had an associated smell. He described the source of putrefaction and how the "raw surface" of the wound could putrify before the granulations formed or the liquids on the surface of the granulations putrified. The liquids were extremely acrid and acted on the sensory nerves to initiate indirect inflammation and fever. This led to increased cell turnover and cellular death, increasing the quantity of putrescent material in the wound. Sloughs were produced that resulted in suppuration.

In the next section, Lister made his most famous declaration, namely that the decomposition of organic tissue was not caused by the gaseous components in the atmosphere but "minute particles suspended in [the air], which are the germs of various low forms of life, long since revealed by the microscope, and regarded as merely accidental concomitants of putrescence" and had been identified by Pasteur as the "essential cause" of putrefaction. His idea of germs during this period were not the same as the germs described in later germ theory. This is clearly attributed by his use of the phrasing "..living organism's developed from germs". He described germs as working in the same manner as yeast converts sugar to alcohol. They were scavengers who lived on dead tissue, not parasites on living tissue but as highly adaptable agents whose pathogenic properties depended on where they came from. Like many surgeons of the age, Lister believed that fever was a product of local miasma. In that respect, Lister's paper is open to many interpretations, but in the context of wounds, he believed that living tissue could resist germs. He never made the distinction as to whether germs were living beings for example in erysipelas, that entered the body or were a chemical agent.

In the rest of the paper, Lister described using carbolic acid, and how the acid formed a dense crust protecting the wound from the ingress of germs. He then described the detailed case histories of 11 patients. Healing by granulation occurred in all cases except 7,10, and 11, which did not suppurate. Cases 1 and 9 did suppurate. Lister did not regard pus as significant, as it was not associated with inflammation or change in putrefaction. He had attained healing by granulation without inflammation in compound fracture cases. He believed that the elimination of suppuration was not a desirable therapeutic outcome, as a small amount of suppuration on a healthy granulation was not a cause for alarm.

==== Carcinoma of the breast ====
In July 1867, Lister discovered that his sister Isabella Pim had breast cancer. Pim had visited Paget and Syme to seek treatment but had such an extensive carcinoma that both surgeons advised against operating. Lister made the difficult decision to perform a radical mastectomy. He consulted Syme in Edinburgh and rehearsed the operation on a dead body. The recovery went smoothly and although there was some suppuration in the wound, Lister's use of antiseptics prevented putrefaction. The next day he wrote to his father, "I may say the operation was done at least as well as if she was not my sister. But I do not wish to do such a thing again." Pim lived for another three years before dying of liver metastasis on 9 August 1870.

==== Dressing refinements ====
Lister continued to refine the dressing and perfect the antiseptic treatment on several other compound fractures and patients with abscesses. He would often spend long nights experimenting in his home laboratory. He searched for a germicidal material that could be placed on the wound; known as the protective, it would serve to protect the wound from the irritating effects of the acid and stop the ingress of microbes but enable bodily secretions to escape. He initially looked at using caoutchouc but the material allowed the acid to pass right through. He found block tin to be too rigid and tinfoil soon wore away. Gold leaf was found to be too fragile. Lister also looked at thin toughened glass but it could not be obtained.

==== Antiseptic principle of the practice of surgery ====
The widespread introduction of antiseptic surgical methods followed the publishing of Lister's Antiseptic Principle of the Practice of Surgery in 1867.

Within a few days of the publishing of the last part of the previous paper, Syme asked Lister to attend the British Medical Association meeting in Dublin on 9 August 1867. Lister had some difficulty preparing a new paper, the seminal "On the Antiseptic Principle in the Practice of Surgery-*" Lister's second paper on antiseptic surgery. It was later published in the British Medical Journal (BMJ) on 21 September 1867.

Lister claimed that based on experiments on inflammation, the essential cause of suppuration in wounds was decomposition. Several aspects of this claim need to be examined. Firstly, it was specific to wounds, as Lister had other views about suppuration elsewhere on the body. Secondly, he stipulated that decomposition was the "essential" cause of suppuration, i.e. not the only cause. Thirdly, decomposition was the cause of pus in wounds. Lister's pronouncement is best described as that he had discovered that the only important cause of suppuration in inflamed wounds is decomposition. Lister was specifically referring to the pathology of pus formation in inflamed tissue, the essential cause of harm in the practice of surgery. His appeal to the reader, and to surgical consensus, was: "To prevent the occurrence of suppuration, with all its attendant risks, was an object manifestly desirable", and refers to the surgeon's dread of pus appearing in an inflamed wound. Lister then made the wholly inaccurate statement that "...oxygen, which was universally regarded as the agent by which putrefaction was effected" compared to other sources. Lister introduced the work of Pasteur, claiming that decomposition might be avoided by using a dressing that could destroy the minute organisms in the wound. Lister decided to formulate his new surgical technique into a general principle. He termed it the "antiseptic principle", thus linking its nomenclature to carbolic acid. His principle was that all the local inflammatory mischief and general febrile disturbance which follow severe injuries are due to the irritation, and the reason for this was the carbolic acid induced suppuration but prevented decomposition, which was contrary to normal surgical treatment that saw suppuration as an indication that something was wrong, in Lister's case essentially that the antiseptic treatment had failed.[325] influence of decomposing blood or sloughs. (Note: Emphasis is present in the original) He was stating a "great principle" – not that decomposition was the cause of disease in wounds, but that it was the only cause.

The paper instructed surgeons to continue treatment even when suppuration appeared. The reason for this was the carbolic acid-induced suppuration but prevented decomposition, which was contrary to normal surgical treatment, which saw suppuration as an indication that something was wrong, in Lister's case essentially that the antiseptic treatment had failed. He noted that he felt it necessary to affirm on "pathological principles" that granulation tissue had no inherent tendency to form pus but only did so when "subjected to a preternatural tendency". He explained that carbolic acid and decomposing substances were similar, i.e., both caused suppuration by a chemical process but carbolic acid only acted on the surface of the tissue to which it was applied, but decomposition is a "self-propagating and self-aggravating poison". Decomposing tissue was a breeding ground for more decomposition that led to putrefaction in the tissue surrounding it.

Lister argued that the pus formed by carbolic acid was acceptable as long as it was not accompanied by inflammation. In this respect, Lister's approach to normal or abnormal healing by granulation was the same as the average surgeon of the period: that healthy healing did not occur when inflammation was present.

Lister paid particular attention to putrefaction. The last part of the paper stating that decomposing wounds were the cause of disease in hospitals, which was not an uncommon belief amongst the surgical community. He described how the two large wards where he offered treatment were the unhealthiest in Glasgow and how since the application of antiseptics, "wounds and abscesses no longer poison the atmosphere with putrid exhalations" and the wards completely changed their character. Not a single instance of pyaemia, hospital gangrene, or erysipelas had occurred in them since the new regime of antiseptics had begun. However, Lister did not explain how the "putrid exhalations" led to fever.

==== Illustrations of the antiseptic system of treatment in surgery ====
On 21 September 1867, Lister published a new paper, "Illustrations of the Antiseptic System of Treatment in Surgery", in The Lancet, his third paper on antisepsis. This paper was supposed be the first in a new series with the next paper to be on wounds with simple incisions but it never appeared.

The paper summarised his earlier claims and added further observations on the nature of putrefaction. He stated that the "character of the decomposition in a given fermentable substance is determined by the nature of the organism that develops in it". He suggested that the cause of fermentation in food was yeasts and putrefaction was possibly caused by Vibrios (a type of bacteria). At the end of the paper, he stated that on the basis of his new antiseptic theory "a really trustworthy treatment for compound fractures and other severe contused wounds has been established for the first time, so far as I am aware, in the history of surgery".

=== First reception of antisepsis (1867–1868) ===
Although Lister was honoured in later life, his ideas about the transmission of infection and the use of antiseptics were widely criticised in his early career. On 24 August 1867, within a month of Lister's publishing his first paper on antiseptics, the editor of The Lancet, Lister's nemesis James G. Wakley, wrote an editorial crediting Pasteur for Lister's research and invited physicians to investigate Lister's claims and report their findings to the journal.

==== Simpson's attack ====
On 21 September 1867, Scottish obstetrician James Young Simpson, professor of medicine and midwifery at Edinburgh University and discoverer of chloroform, published an editorial that attacked Lister in the Edinburgh Daily Review, written under the pen name "Chirurgicus", a common practice to signal a personal attack. Simpson's motive was that he was trying to convince the medical community of the efficacy of his acupressure technique, which used needles to halt arterial haemorrhage, counter to Lister's use of ligatures. The editorial letter was the first of many and began a tit-for-tat argument in the press over months and eventually led to the acceptance of antisepsis.

Simpson claimed that Lister's prior article had copied a continental practice and accused him of plagiarising the work of French doctor and pharmacist Jules Lemaire. Lemaire had described carbolic acid as a constituent of coal tar in 1860 in "Saponinated coal tar" and after a long series of investigations had followed up with an 1863 book, De l'acide phénique, de son action sur les végétaux, les animaux, les ferments, les venins, les virus, les miasmes et de ses applications à l'industrie, à l'hygiène, aux sciences anatomiques et à la thérapeutique ("Carbolic acid, its action on plants, animals, ferments, venoms, viruses, miasmas and its applications to industry, hygiene, anatomical sciences and therapy") with the second edition in 1865, where he described the antiseptic power of carbolic acid. While Lemaire believed in the germ theory and realised the causes of putrefaction, he made no attempt to develop a process to exclude them from the wound.

On 5 October 1867, Lister gave a robust reply to Simpson in a letter "On the Use of Carbolic Acid" to The Lancet, denying that he had heard of Lemaire's work and arguing that that work had made little impact on the medical profession. (Note: Contrary to Lister's appraisal, there was excited interest in Lemaire's work in France.) Lister went on to defend his work, stating:

"For my own part, I may say that, of all the gentlemen from Great Britain and both continents who have recently visited Glasgow, not one has ever expressed the slightest doubt that the system in question was entirely new; the novelty, I may remark, being, not the surgical use of carbolic acid (which I never claimed), but the methods of its employment with the view of protecting the reparatory processes from disturbance by external agency."

He unsuccessfully searched all the Glasgow libraries for Lemaire's work before finally discovering a copy in the library of Edinburgh University. On 19 October, Lister wrote a follow-up letter to The Lancet and stated he did not claim to be the first physician to use carbolic acid and that he chose the acid due to its strength as an antiseptic. He also included a letter of support from a Carlisle medical student, Phillip Hair, who had studied in Paris. Hair stated he had seen no treatments there that were as effective as Lister's. Lister's response angered Simpson and two weeks later on 2 November 1867 he published a bitter reply, "Carbolic acid and its compounds in surgery" in The Lancet under his own name. Simpson reiterated his previous claims about Lemaire's and others' prior use of the acid, mentioning James Spence, who had used the acid to wash amputations, but had abandoned its use. He cited a report by Sampson Gamgee who visited Paris and reported that surgeons were using a solution of 100:1 of water to acid, while Lister recommended 40:1. Simpson exposed his true motives when he compared his preferred technique of acupressure to Lister's use of ligatures. He used the work of William Pirrie, professor of surgery at Aberdeen University, who had used acupressure to stop pus formation during breast cancer operations, to illustrate his point, that there had been no deaths from pyaemia at the hospital, compared to the many deaths in Glasgow and Edinburgh. Simpson was acutely embarrassed when Pirrie replied a week later in The Lancet in a small article titled "On the Use of Carbolic Acid in Burns", recommending its use for burn injuries and believing it proved effective in other treatments. Lister replied with a short note on 9 November to ask the reader to: "to judge for themselves how far the present attack admits of justification, promising to publish additional articles on his antiseptic technique".

First response to antiseptic surgery

Wakley, the Lancet editor who invited responses to Lister's papers

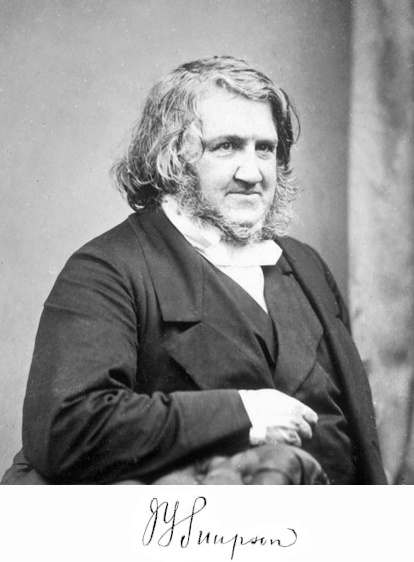
Simpson became Lister's nemesis, to promote his accupressure technique that was superseded by Listers ligatures

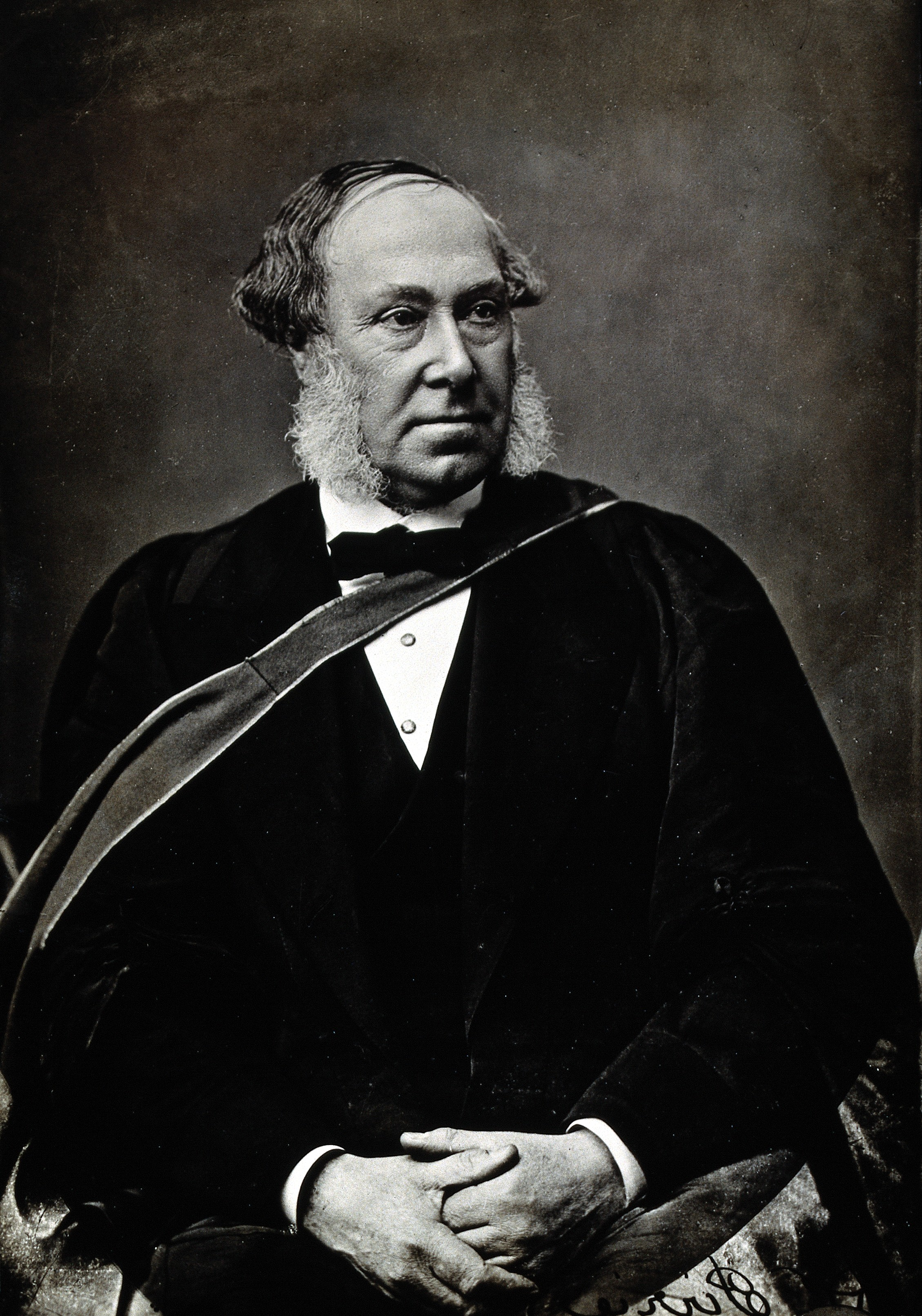
Pirrie described using the acid for burn treatment.

Sampson Gamgee documented the early use of carbolic acid in Paris.

In December, two further letters were published in The Lancet. The first was by young physician Arthur Hensman, who credited Lister with an original technique that he considered of a practical use. The second letter was more assertive, declaring that Lister's technique was not described by the use of that acid but by the way it was applied, affirming that the technique was important.

==== First experimentalist ====
The first experimentalist surgeon to question the validity of the airborne microorganisms hypothesis, i.e. the Lister germ theory, was professor of clinical medicine at Edinburgh University John Hughes Bennett. In a 17 January 1868 lecture for the Royal College of Surgeons of Edinburgh Bennett advanced The Atmospheric Germ Theory, agreeing with the theories of Félix Archimède Pouchet, professor of natural history at the University of Rouen, who believed in spontaneous generation of life. Bennett attacked Pasteur's experimental foundations of germ theory and called him a mere chemist. Pasteur described an experiment in 1861, where he had boiled a meat broth in a swan neck flask; the bend in the neck of the flask prevented falling particles from reaching the broth, while still allowing the free flow of air. The flask remained free of growth for an extended period. When the flask was turned so that particles could fall down the bends, the broth quickly became clouded. This showed that if air was prevented from entering the flask, then no microorganisms would appear, while conversely, if air was introduced leading to dust getting in, microorganisms would appear. This confirmed that the spontaneous generation theory was false. Bennet believed that the germs that Pasteur captured could not be identified as organic organisms. as he couldn't see them, stating "Where are these little beasts? Show them to us, and we shall believe in them. Has anyone seen them yet?".

Bennett described his own theory of molecular degeneration to explain how microorganisms transformed old tissue into new tissue by the action of molecules. Bennett taught that molecules rather than cells were the foundational building blocks of tissue and that microorganisms could be spontaneously created from different combinations of molecules. In his view, each molecule had a specific function, i.e. certain molecules were destructive to tissue, while others constructed tissue. Bennett believed that diseases developed from the physical properties of the air, such as its density or changes in temperature. In an experiment, Bennett had captured dust from the air, purified it and examined under a microscope. He believed that the components of this dust were also found in minerals and they were either lint, debris from clothing, vegetable matter or pieces of seeds. In particular, Bennett disagreed with Pasteur about temperature. Pasteur had discovered that heating an infusion to 30 degrees above boiling point killed the germs. He also discovered that extreme cold killed them. In the lecture, Bennett referred to Pouchet's experiments in trying to duplicate Pasteur's experiments. Pouchet had raised the temperature to 50 degrees above boiling in the flasks, but they still exhibited contamination. Bennett took this as evidence that the cause of putrefaction must be non-living matter and that Pasteur had proved that point by using burnt yeast that was clearly dead to cause fermentation. Bennett never realised that it was Pasteur's ability to ensure the flasks remained germ free that proved the germ theory of disease.

The experimentalists

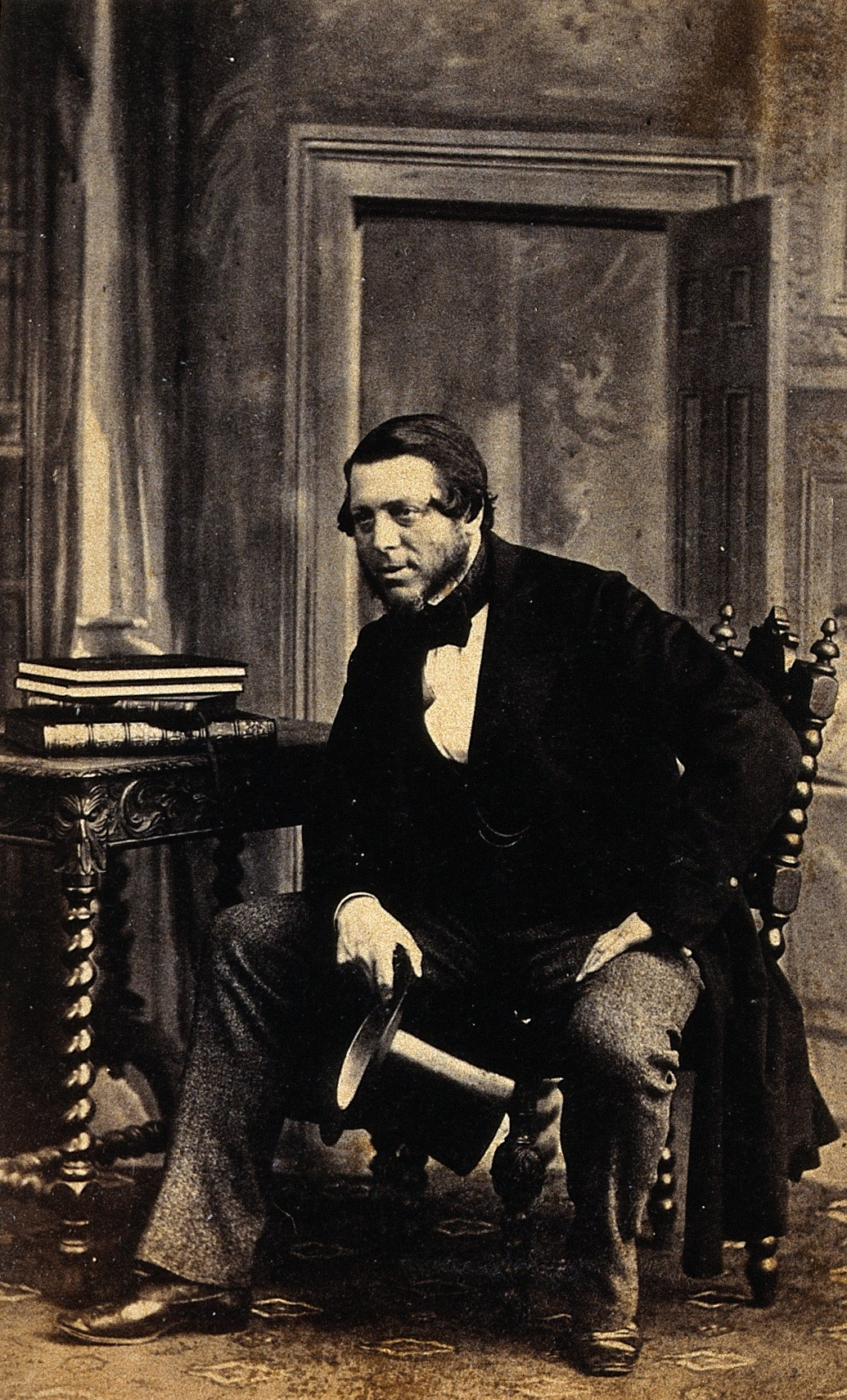
Bennett believed in the spontaneous generation of life.

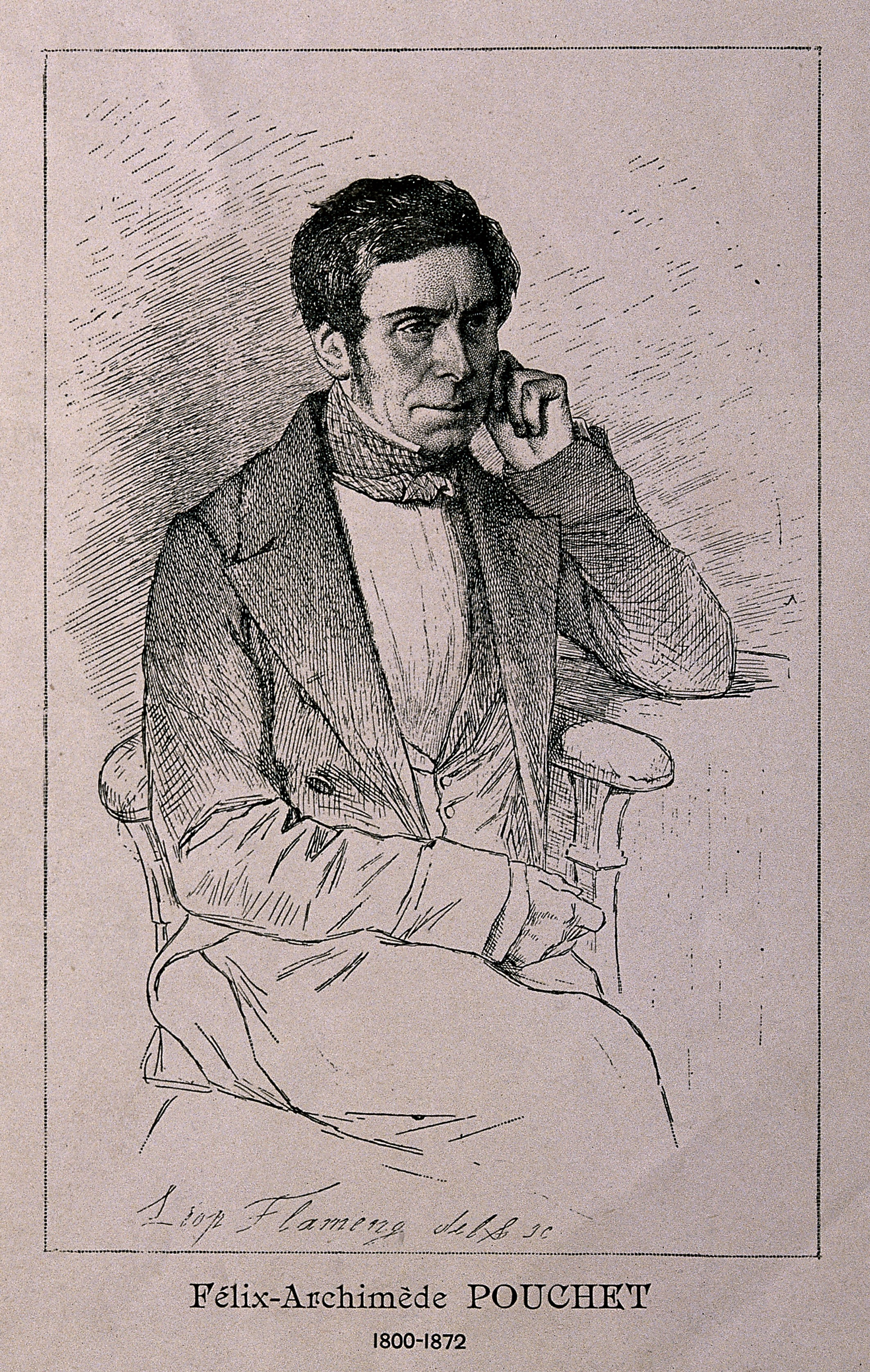
Pouchet believed in the spontaneous generation of life.

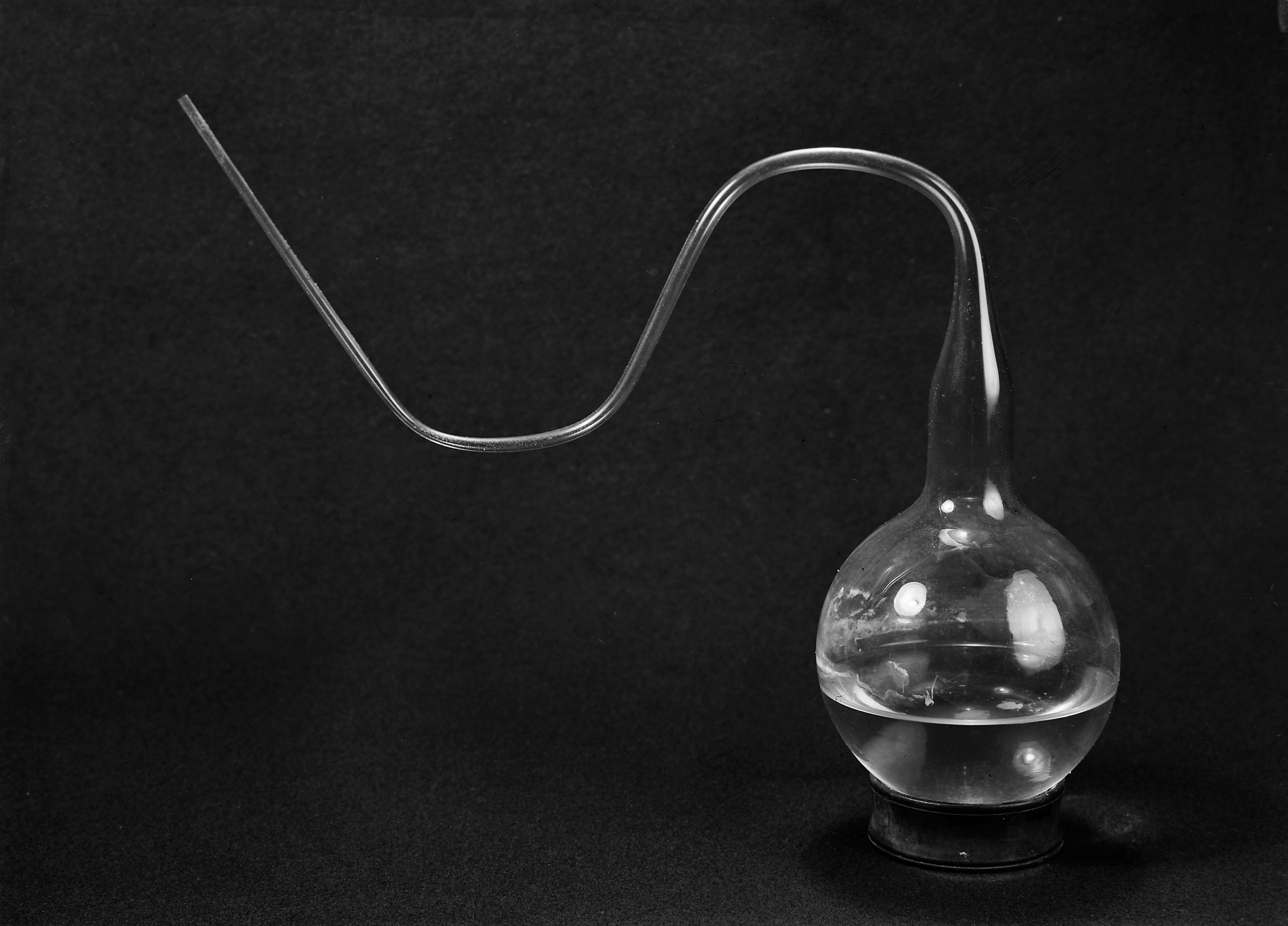
Swan-necked flask used by Pasteur in his experiments to disprove the doctrine of spontaneous generation.

==== Reception abroad ====
The earliest beneficiaries and users of Lister's techniques were his students and his staff. Syme was naturally the first peer of Lister to adopt antisepsis. The first international use of antiseptics was by Boston surgeon George Derby of Boston City Hospital on 21 September 1867, within days of arrival of The Lancet. Derby successfully treated a nine-year-old boy who had fallen from a tree, resulting in a compound fracture. Other North American surgeons began adopting the new technique including the Canadian surgeon Archibald Edward Malloch who had studied at Glasgow medical school and became Lister's house surgeon when Lister began using carbolic acid. In February 1869, Malloch by then in private practice in Hamilton, Ontario successfully treated a seven-month old baby that had developed an abscess due to septic arthritis in the right hip. Malloch had collaborated with Lister and understood the germ theory. He had demonstrated a series of fractures cases to Samuel D. Gross a prominent Philadelphia surgeon, who rejected the new technique. Indeed, most North American surgeons were loath to accept the principle, vividly illustrated by David Hayes Agnew who was still using outdated surgical techniques in 1881 when he treated President James Garfield who had been shot.

The widest acceptance of Lister's technique was in Germany. Leipzig surgeon Karl Thiersch of St. Jacob's Hospital began practicing the technique in 1867 and taught it to his students. His house surgeon Hermann Georg Joseph had visited Lister in Glasgow and then tested it on 16 patients with abscesses, with favourable results. Joseph wrote a report on his results, and presented it on 21 December 1867. Within five years, the antiseptic method was universally accepted in Germany. French surgeons were hestitant in accepting the theory, except for Paris surgeon Just Lucas-Championnière of Hôtel-Dieu who adopted the technique when he visited Lister in Glasgow as a medical student in 1868 and became the leading French pioneer of Listerism. In 1875, Lucas-Championnière visited Lister a second time and then wrote the first French reference on antiseptics in the "Journal de Médecine et de chirurgie pratiques" (Journal of Practical Medicine and Surgery).

==== Sterility experiment ====
In October 1867, Lister repeated a modified form of Pasteur's experiment, originally devised by French chemist Chevreul, to support his germ theory and disprove the theory of spontaneous generation. Lister poured urine into four glass flasks, then washed the necks to remove any urine and modified three of them, extending and drawing their necks into a narrow tube bent at an acute angle. The fourth's neck was cut short and left vertical, but with a reduced diameter, smaller than the others' necks. The flasks were then boiled and when the heat was withdrawn, air was allowed to rush into the flask to replace the condensed steam. The flasks were then left undisturbed in the same room, the necks open to the air. Within four days a vegetative mould appeared in the fourth flask while the other three flasks remained clear. In November, he began using the flasks in his class. His dresser John Rudd Leeson described how Lister took the three flasks to London on their laps in a specially reserved first-class cabin, to ensure they survived the journey.

Sterility experiment to disprove the theory of spontaneous generation

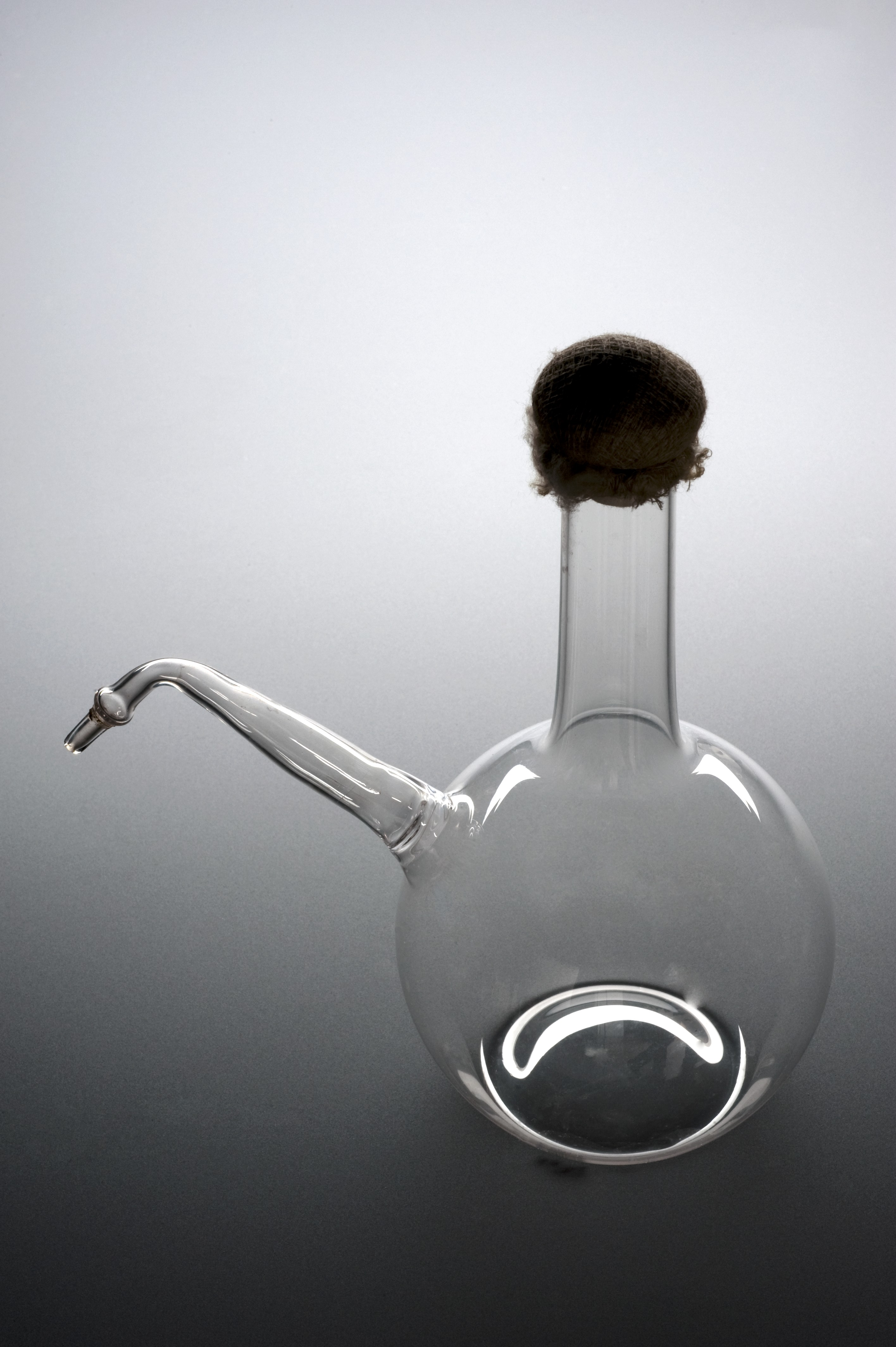
Glass flask used in the experiment

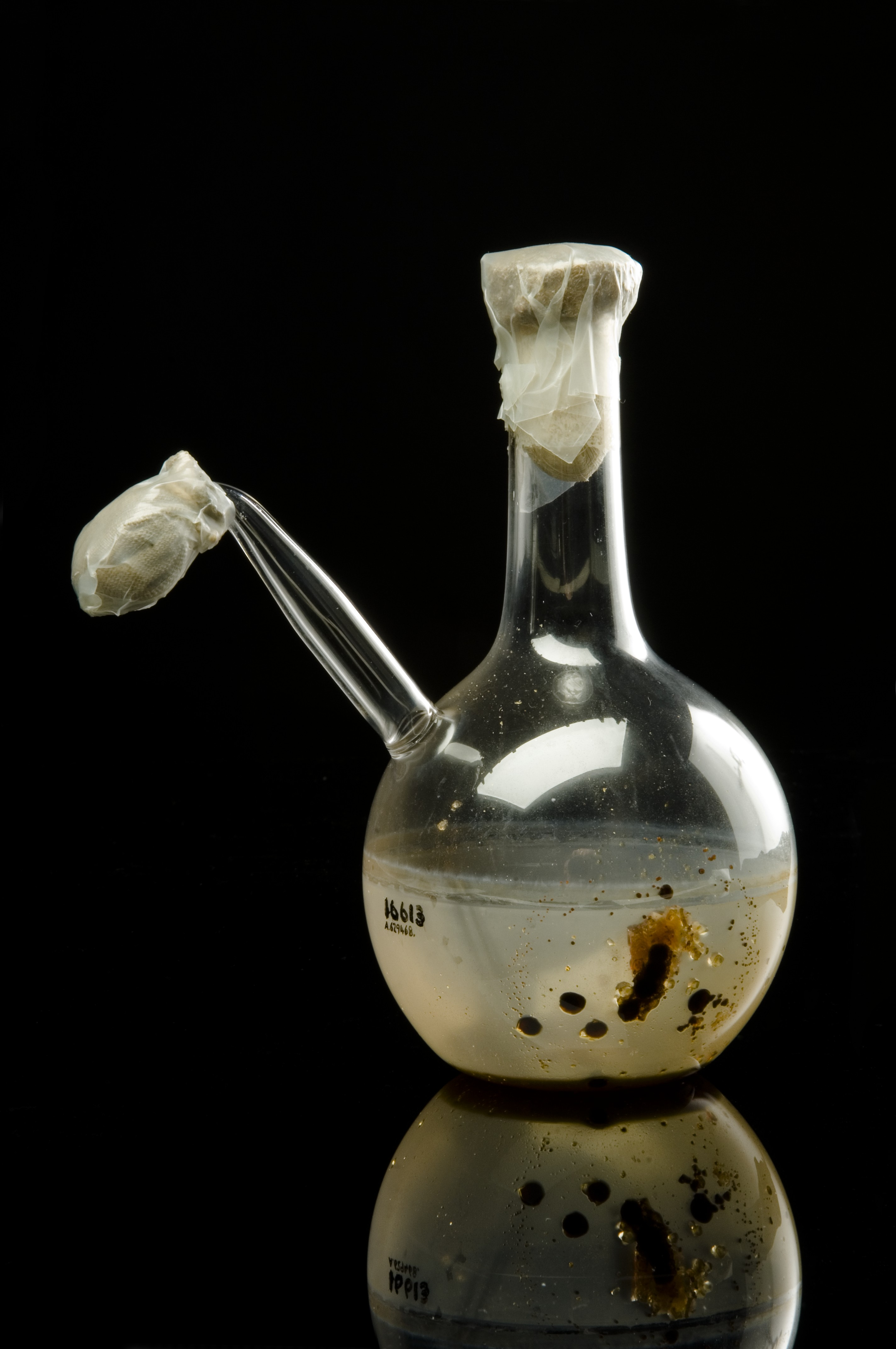
Glass flask containing urine

Louis Pasteur's pasteurisation experiment illustrates the fact that the spoilage of liquid was caused by particles in the air rather than the air itself. Lister sought to duplicate Pasteur's experiments as they were important pieces of evidence supporting the germ theory of putrefaction.

=== The catgut ligature (1867–1869) ===
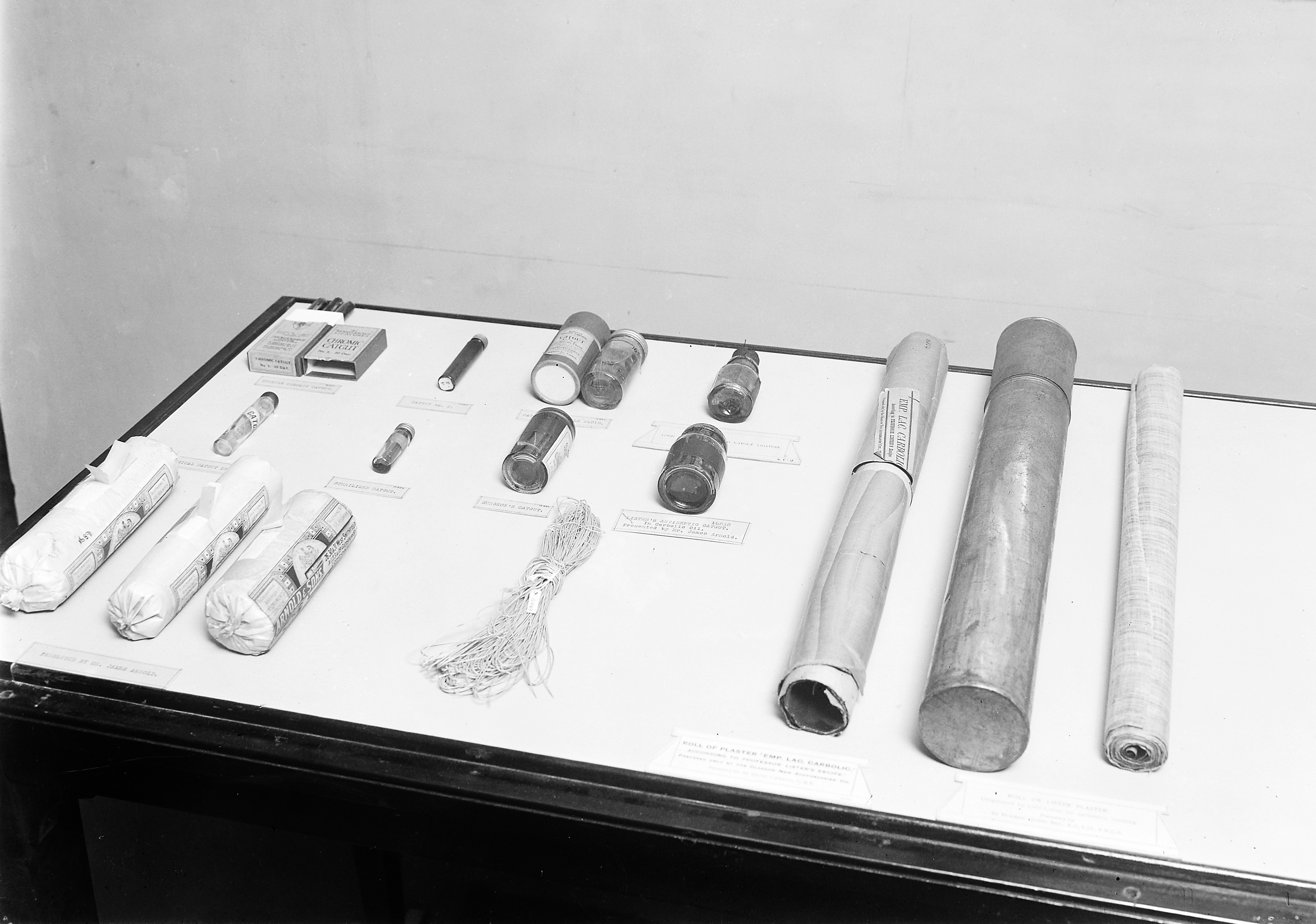
Tray of different types of catgut used by Lister

Listers catgut-holder containing catgut wound onto 2 bits of wood c.1869

A practical problem in general surgery that Lister researched and developed was absorbable ligatures that were used to tie large blood vessels during amputation. It had been known for years that gunshot bullets, i.e. smooth metallic objects, could remain inside the body without causing suppuration but suppuration would occur in silk or thread ligatures, which resulted in the ends being left outside the body to enable the ligatures' removal. However, that method left an open path for germs to enter the body alongside the ligating material, and presented a risk of secondary hemorrhage when the ligatures were removed. By late 1867, he understood that ligatures were sources of irritation. Lister also noticed, while treating a patient with a compound fracture, how a piece of dead bone had become live bone again as new blood vessels suffused the fracture. He reasoned that it was possible to find a material that could be absorbed into the body, thereby reducing the ingress of germs. He initially took the standard silk thread and impregnated it with carbolic acid. On 12 December 1867, in the first of a series of experiments, Lister tested the new ligature by tying the carotid artery of a horse. When the horse died six weeks later (of natural causes) it was dissected, and he found dense fibrous tissue had grown over the ligature. But he noticed the silk was being absorbed rather slowly.

On 2 February 1868, in a letter to his father he reported using the new ligature on a private patient with a leg aneurysm. The patient recovered completely. On 5 February, he expressed his profound excitement at the patient's recovery to his father. However, the lady died 10 months later of another aneurysm due to vascular disease. During the dissection, Lister found that most of the ligature had been absorbed but found a tiny blob of thick pus on the remaining piece, that led him to think an abscess could have formed. He began looking for another material and settled on catgut. On 31 December 1868, while staying at Upton for Christmas, Lister tested the new carbolised catgut on a calf, running the experiment in his father's museum. He again tied the carotid artery and after a month, the calf was dissected. Initially he thought the ligature was still in-situ, but on closer examination saw that living tissue was growing into the structure. In a letter to his father, he described his findings :

I know thee will be anxious to know what I have found in the calf's neck. Well, at first on dissecting down on the artery I was much disappointed to see that the ligatures were still there, as large as ever. But on attempting to isolate them from surrounding parts, I found them inseparably blended with the coats of the artery. And further examination confirmed the conclusion that the substance of the ligatures had been replaced by living tissue, differing in character altogether from that of the gut; being fibrous tissue in process of formation, not perfect tissue like that of the gut or peritoneum."

However, the catgut preparation still was not suitable as he found it too slippery to use. He accidentally discovered that when a small amount of water was added to the acid and oil mixture, he found the catgut became both stronger and less slippery, rendering it suitable for regular use. He called this process "Seasoning" Now proven to work, it was sold in bottles of carbolised oil, a product that was in production for ten years. It was also sold wound into an oil-tight silver bottle containing a winder that was kept alongside a bottle of the acid. He continued to refine his catgut ligatures his whole life. On 3 April 1869, he published the results of his catgut experiments, "Observations on Ligature of Arteries on the Antiseptic System" in The Lancet that reported the experiment on the calf. The Lancet gave a glowing review on the paper.

The first person to use Lister's catgut was Edward Robert Bickersteth of Liverpool Royal Infirmary. A former student of Syme and follower of antiseptics, he wrote a letter to Syme on 20 April 1869, describing two successful operations, the first on the cartotid artery for aneurysm and the second on the external iliac artery. However, there were failures. James Spence had used it to tie the common carotid artery on a patient who had died. The postmortem found the catgut had changed into a gelatinous state. The surgeon who supplied it admitted incorrectly preparing it properly and was summarily sacked. Bickersteth showed by a simple experiment in The Lancet that the catgut should have retained its strength for much longer period. By 1870, Lister was using catgut in the Brachiocephalic artery, the largest artery it could be used on.

==== Improved dressings ====
While working on ligatures, Lister was continuing the development of an improved dressings. His latest refinement was the "cerate dressing" consisted of 6 parts paraffin, 2 parts wax, 1 part olive oil and 1/2 or 1/4 carbolic acid mixture on calico. On 8 March 1868, in a letter to his father, he described how his goal of a lighter dressing has been achieved: "all the inconveniences of the putty are got rid of, along with superior efficiency for some situations, as the new paste can be applied to parts to which it was impossible to apply the putty satisfactorily". However, the new dressing was too brittle for use. The next dressing Lister created was the "lac-plaster" that consisted of four-parts shellac to one-part acid coated onto calico. It was found to be too sticky, so Lister coated it with solution of India rubber in benzene. When the benzene evaporated, a thin layer of India rubber was deposited on the plaster that stopped it sticking to the skin, but allowed the antiseptic to work. In a letter to Malloch on 10 September 1868, he had changed the coating to red lead pigment (a poison) that was incorporated into the calico, which made it less sticky. When used, it could be washed in water to restore the original stickiness.

Lister was acutely aware of the irritating effects of phenol and the need to limit its effects. Lister experiments in clinical practice had shown how the acid passed through both gutta-percha and India rubber but didn't pass through oiled silk that was used for water dressings, quite so well.

By 1869, Lister had eventually settled on the use of oiled silk sold under the "Green oiled silk protective" brand for the protective. The silk surface was painted with one part dextrine, two parts of powdered starch and 16 parts of watery acid in a 20-1 water-acid solution, to ensure a thorough wetting. (Note: As silk is hydrophobic, the watery solution of carbolic acid would not easily penetrate the material, as any water-based solution would bead when it met the silk. Using the fine Dextrin and starch mixture painted onto the silk allowed the acid to be absorbed into the powder and permeate the material.) The sterile silk dressing was an effective barrier between the acid and the tissue. Lister formally described the new treatment on 14 February 1870, in a clinical lecture on a compound dislocation of the ankle, as "An antiseptic to exclude putrefaction with a protective to exclude the atmosphere will by their joint action, keep the wound from abnormal stimulus". On top of the protective was up to eight layers of gauze.

==== Address to the Royal Medico-Chirurgical Society ====
On 17 April 1868, Lister gave an address to the University of Glasgow Medico-Chirurgical Society. He spoke at length about the atmospheric germ theory and used his flask experiment to illustrate the theory in an effort to disprove the spontaneous generation of life. He also introduced catgut ligature and described five case histories to support his theory. During the two hour talk he gave three prerequisites to ensure success. The first was a belief in the antispetic technique, the second was a belief in the germ theory of disease and the third was that the surgeon must have a dependable antiseptic on hand.

The address was the first time that Lister used the phrase "The germ theory of putrefaction" that both Lister and Cheyne would frequently use over the next decade. The most significant aspect of the address was that healing by organisation (Note: Healing by organisation is an archaic term that describes how the wound edges are not approximated and is left open. The damaged tissue in the wound is repaired by the ingrowth of granulation tissue that later matures into fibrous tissue known as a scar. Now known as secondary intention healing) in a blood clot was preferable in complex wounds to healing by first intention. (Note: Healing by first intention is when the edges of a wound are approximated and bought together where new connective tissue known as granulation tissue forms.) Healing by organisation was not well understood during this period. Lister considered it similar to granulation healing that produced less scar tissue. For simple wounds he would bring the edges together and would seek first intention healing, in a manner similar to what other surgeons of the day would do. With complex wounds like compound fractures where the wound edges could not be brought together, he wanted a scab to form through healing by organisation. Treatment was simplified in that case and saved a drain being inserted to remove discharges. He tried to avoid a granulating sore (Note: A form of granulation tissue that is unhealthy, darker red in colour instead of a healthy pink, bleeds easily and becomes an serious impediment to healing in the wound.) forming which put the patient at greater risk. As his theory evolved on how clots healed, he began to consider granulation tissue as a product of "abnormal stimulation". He described it thus:

It is only when they have been gradually changed under the influence of prolonged abnormal stimulation into that rudimentary form of tissue which, when we see it on the surface of a sore, we term granulations, that they are liable to produce, when still further stimulated, the still more rudimentary pus corpuscle.

Lister believed that while antiseptics initially stimulated the wound, it enabled the wound to heal without granulation.

=== Visitors to Glasgow ===
Beginning in the spring of 1868, Lister had several more visitors in Glasgow. These included Joseph Bell, a former student of Lister and William MacCormac. In June 1868, Marcus Beck visited Lister and was invited to attended lectures given by Lister on operative surgery. In a letter to his father in July 1868, he describes how Beck was horrified when Lister made a free incision into a patients knee joint to repair loose cartilage.

During this period Lister read several reports in 'The Lancet on the successful use of his technique. One in July 1868 was from Pearson Robert Cresswell (1834–1905), chief surgeon to the Dowlais Ironworks in Merthyr Tydfil. Cresswell reported successfully treating a man who had been shot in the leg. He described the new technique as "quite a revolution". In August, the lecture series ended and the couple went on holiday to Ventnor on the Isle of Wight.

=== Reception at home ===
On 5 September 1868, Wakley, who was aware of the report, wondered why London hospitals had not adopted antiseptics and posted a sarcastic enquiry on : "Are the conditions of suppuration different here from those in Glasgow or Dowlais? Or is it that the antiseptic treatment is not tried with that care without which Mr. Lister has always pointed out it does not succeed?". On 17 October 1868, Scottish surgeon Lawson Tait in the first of many disputes with Lister, stated in a letter to The Medical Times and Gazette:

I have not been able to discover the slightest benefit from its use... In 12 cases of compound fracture where there existed a probability of union without supparation did occur were two in which I employed the acid paste exactly as recommended by Mr Lister.

Tait did make it clear that he believed that compound fractures could heal by first intention.

Over the next several months Wakley published a series of brief reports from London surgeons. The first to report were St George's Hospital surgeons, who followed Lister's directions exactly on 26 cases of lacerations but only 7 healed correctly and none by first intention healing. They described how little they understood antiseptics. In November 1868, Thomas William Nunn of Middlesex Hospital had some initial success but other surgeons offered differing opinions to its efficacy of the technique and described the acid as one of several disenfectants that could be used to dress wounds. The surgeons at Guys and St Bartholomew's Hospital had a similar experience. On 5 December 1868, the prominent pathologist James Paget of St Bartholomew's Hospital reported that he found the acid "useless" but admitted he might have been applying the technique incorrectly. Thomas Bryant, the chief surgeon at Guy's Hospital felt the technique worked as had John Wood at King's College Hospital who experimented with many different antiseptic compounds. There was also positive news when The Prince of Wales's General Hospital in Tottenham reported that it was using the full antiseptic system and had no pyaemia or erysipelas cases but one surgeon John Marshall refused the treatment due to a patients "green urine and other toxic symptoms".

==== Defence of tradition ====
In July 1869, at the annual conference of the British Medical Association (BMA) at Leeds, attended by both Simpson and Bennett, the English surgeon Thomas Nunneley mocked Lister's ideas on antisepsis and expressed disbelief in the germ-theory of wound infections. Nunneley was a well respected researcher and expert on erysipelas who proudly boasted during the surgical address that he had not permitted a single patient to be treated by carbolic acid during the three years that his colleagues had used it and achieved no better results than him. He labeled antiseptic treatment as both "fashionable" and "in vogue", based on "unsupported fancies which have little other existence than what is found in the imagination of those who believe in them".

However, it was his attack on Lister central premise of the germ theory that was so useful to Lister's detractors; that first intention healing occurred in wounds that were exposed to the air. In his conclusion he stated:

Suppuration, per se, is not an unhealthy action, nor is pus itself always an injurious substance; but when the process can be prevented by union by the first intention, so much the better for the patient; for, wherever pus or effused blood exist, there is more or less danger of their becoming decomposed, absorption taking place, and the system being poisoned by them.... If freely exposed stumps heal up readily and well, it must be at once apparent that those which do so when most elaborately swathed in carbolised wrappings, do so rather in spite of, than as a consequence of, the treatment.

On 7 August 1869, Lister forwarded a letter to the British Medical Journal in which he accused Nunneley of being dogmatic with an incomplete understanding of the antiseptic principle. On 14 August, The Lancet editor published a letter to encourage Lister's supporters, "Only experience can determine the actual value of carbolic acid; but Mr. Nunneley has fairly thrown down the gauntlet to those who advocated its use, and we trust that his challenge will not remain unanswered." On 24 August, Lister forwarded a letter he had received from Leeds surgeon Thomas Pridgin Teale, a colleague of Nunneley at Leeds, to correct him of a misassumption, by stating he was using antiseptic treatment. Lister added "That he should dogmatically oppose a treatment which he so little understands; and which, by his own admission, he has never tried." The BMJ intervened to advocate for an end to the dispute and focus on the scientific case, but blamed Nunnely for what they considered a smear campaign. Nunnely then found support in James Morton, a Glasgow surgeon and colleague of Lister's and Donald Campbell Black, Professor of Physiology at Anderson College. Morton in a letter to The Lancet on 23 August, poured scorn on Lister, stating "Those who mount a hobby generally allow it to carry them too far". Black's letter to the BMJ on 4 September 1869 poured scorn on Lister's use of carbolic acid, stating that it was "the latest toy of medical science so-called" and referring to the whole thing as "carbolic acid mania". Both surgeons drew on the results of the work of Edinburgh surgeon Thomas Keith, an ovariotomy specialist, long considered a dangerous operation who supposedly never used antiseptics. However, Keith replied to the BMJ on 18 September that he had used some antiseptic dressings in his operations. On 9 October, Black repeated his views in The Lancet by calling the practice of using carbolic acid to sterilise instruments and the surgeons hands as "...frivolous and unscientific". He used statistics to validate his claims, stating there was no change in death rates from compound fracture cases between 1860 and 1868. Between 1867 and 1868, 33% of amputees died, similar to the figures from 1860 to 1862. (Note: 1868 was the year when Lister's system began to be used by all surgeons at the hospital.) From then on, Lister was determined to use statistics to reveal the mortality rates associated with his treatment. Both Black and Morton failed to understand the principles underlying the antiseptic system.

A defence of tradition

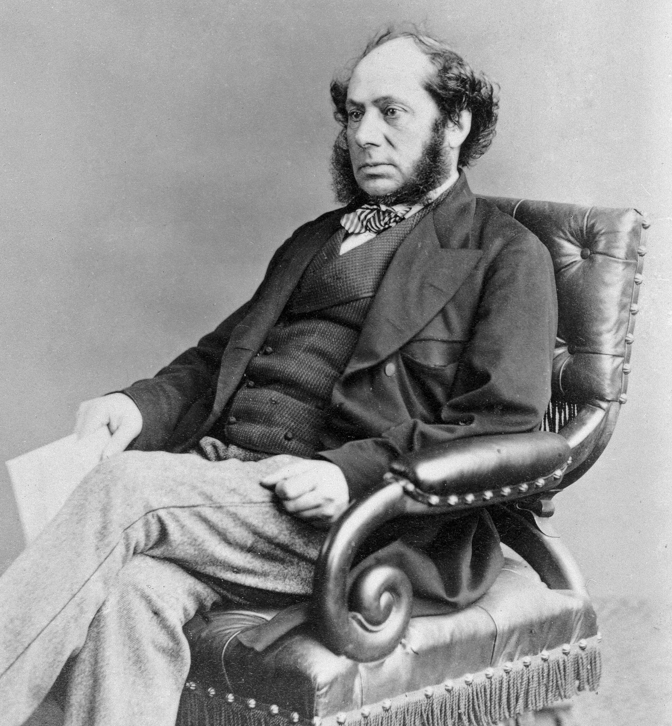
Nunneley was a sceptic of the germ theory and mocked Lister in the pages of the British Medical Journal

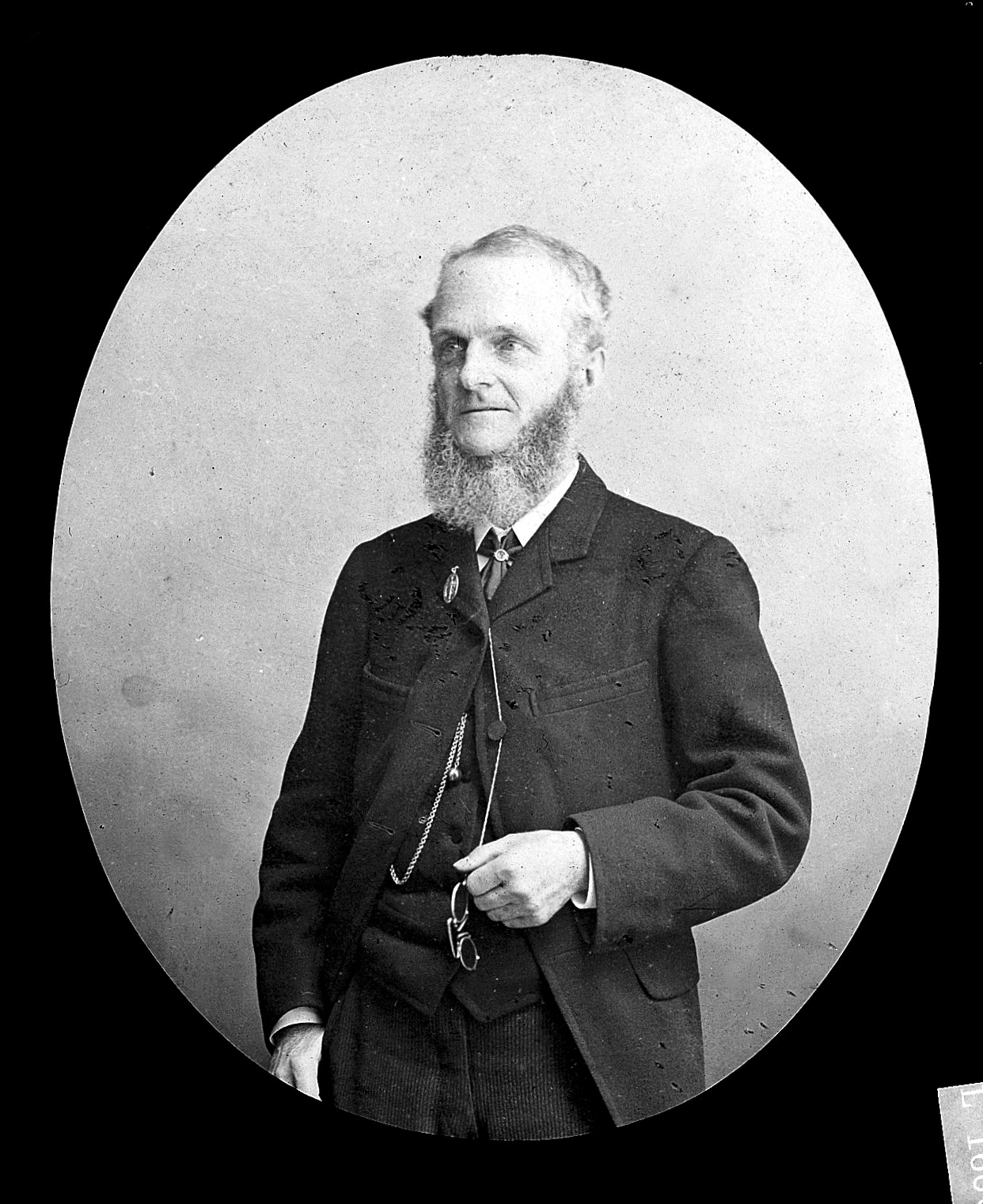
Nunennely used Teale's work as a reference but admitted he used antiseptics

=== Edinburgh appointment ===
In April 1869, Syme had a paralytic seizure that he only partially recovered from and was eventually forced to resign his chair during the summer. At the time, Listers 10-year appointment at Glasgow was coming to an end, making him a natural candidate to replace Syme, who supported Lister candidacy. On 5 July 1869, Lister received a letter from 127 Edinburgh medical students, who believed he was the best candidate for the position and urged Lister to apply:

We take this step from a conviction that you are the man most capable, from your high attainments and achievements in Surgery, to maintain the dignity and renown which have been conferred upon the Chair and the University by Mr. Syme

Lister decided to only use a few testimonials believing quality mattered more than quantity. So he selected Paget, Erichsen, Sharpey, the Manchester surgeon Edward Lund (1823 - 1898), the Principal of Edinburgh University Thomas Barclay and the Liverpool surgeon Edward Robert Bickersteth (1828 - 1908). On 18 August 1869, Lister was elected to the chair of clinical surgery at Edinburgh University. He left Glasgow University in October 1869 and was succeeded by Scottish surgeon George Husband Baird MacLeod.

== Edinburgh 1869–1877 ==
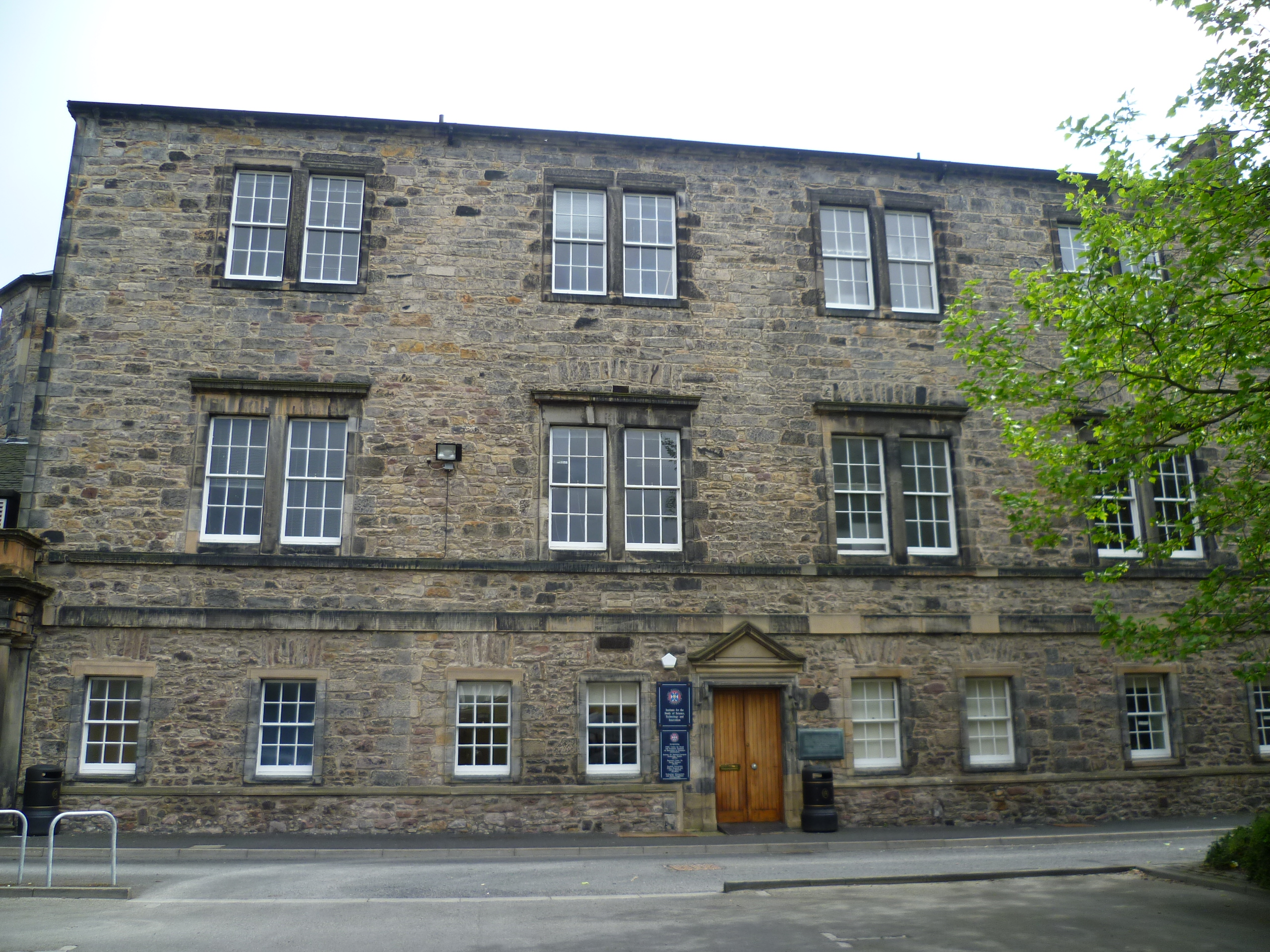
Old Surgical Hospital, Edinburgh Royal Infirmary. Lister had officially 50 beds in the wards in the surgical hospital, but would often take in as many as 70 patients.

=== Fathers death ===
Within a month of Lister's Edinburgh appointment, his father who was 84 became seriously ill. He had been planning a visit to Upton the following week and had written a letter on 12 September, that unbeknownst to him, was his last letter to his father. When his father took a turn for the worse, he rushed south to spend the last few days with him. Joseph Jackson Lister died on 24 October 1869. When the family belongings were split up, many of the books went to Lister. The house at Upton was sold in January 1870. Lister wrote an obituary for this father which was printed in the Monthly Microscopical Journal on 1 March 1870.

In October 1869, the Listers moved across to Edinburgh, first staying at a furnished house at 7 Abercromby Place.

=== Address ===
On 8 November 1869, Lister held his first introductory lecture at Edinburgh medical school, "An introductory Lecture (On the Causation of Putrefaction and Fermentation)" where he elaborated on the nature of germs, as a rebuttal of Bennett's theory and Nunneley's statement that organisms in wounds were the "result and not the cause of putrefaction". Lister opened the lecture by paying tribute to his mentor, Syme, then told his students the importance of clinical practice. Then he turned to an examination of the germ theory, the scientific method and then explained the reasons for his comprehensive rejection of the theory of spontaneous generation, stating that the theory had been "‘chased successively to lower and lower stations in the world of organised beings" and called it "gratuious and uncalled for". He then asked why organisms had taken many different forms of reproduction if they could appear out of ordinary matter, as evidenced by their existence. He introduced his flasks and described how they proved the germ theory. However, Lister was unable to physically examine germs by microcope or provide a model how infection occurred, merely relying on evidence from clinical experience and his knowledge of chemical poisons. Bennett is quoted as saying

Where are these little beasts? Show them to us, and we shall believe in them. Has anyone seen them yet?

=== On the Effects of the Antiseptic System of Treatment upon the Salubrity of a Surgical Hospital ===
On 1 January 1870, Lister published "On the Effects of the Antiseptic System of Treatment upon the Salubrity of a Surgical Hospital" which became his most quoted paper. This was the paper where Lister described the pit burials in the old cathedral churchyard next to the GRI and the many graves from the cholera epidemic of 1849. These coffins were stacked underground inches below the surface and only separated from Lister's male ward by a basement three-feet deep. He described how his wards had undergone a "striking change", "converting them from some of the most unhealthy in the kingdom into models of healthiness". Considered one of his most quoted papers, its purpose was to show if the antiseptic treatment was correctly applied, it would reduce the mortality rate after amputation in even the most unhealthy wards. He compared operative death rates for amputation over a five-year period, between 1867 and 1869 to the two years between 1864 and 1866. The results showed that 16 of 35 patients died in the first period compared to 6 deaths in 40 for the second period, after the antiseptic treatment was introduced. Of 32 cases of compound fracture, none had contracted pyaemia and between that period only 2 deaths from pyaemia occurred, 1 from erysipelas and in 1869, 1 from gangrene. This was particularly impressive, considering Lister's wards were only separated from the other accident male word on the ground-floor of the GRI by a short corridor. That ward had been closed down in 1867 due to an outbreak of disease.

After the death of his father, Lister's writing was no longer tempered by his advice resulting in the paper exhibiting a lack of tact, boastfulness, and level of conceit not seen in his previous papers. After attacking the hospital administrator for not cleaning his wards over a three-year period, he recalled from a meeting in the early 1860s:

At this period I was engaged in a perpetual contest with the managing body, who, anxious to provide hospital accommodation for the increasing population of Glasgow. For which the Infirmary was by no means adequate, were disposed to introduce additional beds beyond those contemplated in the original construction. It is I believe, a fairly attributable to the firmness of my resistance in this matter that, though my patients suffered from evils alluded to in a way that was sickening and often heart-rending... yet none of my wards ever assumed the frightful conditions which sometimes show itself in other parts of the building, making it necessary to shut them up entirely for a time.

On the 15 January, Wakely in The Lancet called for the London surgeons to "fairly and crucially" test the antiseptic treatment. Wakely also commented on hospitalism, i.e. the idea that hospitals themselves were gateways to death resulted in Simpson starting a campaign to destroy certain large hospitals.

The criticisms in the paper resulted in a hostile reaction from the GRI administrators. The secretary Henry Lamond, forwarded a letter to The Lancet and the Glasgow Daily Herald on 29 January 1870, stating "his remarks, so far as they relate to the alleged unhealthiness and condition of this hospital..are unfair and not supported by the facts". He denied Listers claims regarding the omission of cleaning and admitting too many patients, stating the number of beds had remained constant at 144 and the only contest they had with Lister was the length of stay of Listers patients, which averaged 180 days, longer than other surgeons of the time. They offered their own statistics, showing that mortality from amputations in Listers wards were higher at the GRI than those hospitals that Simpson had listed in his "Hospitalism" pamphlet and took credit for the improvements in patient recovery. The January letter gave a Lister a chance to address a "malignant anonymous falsehood" - that the antiseptic treatment used at the GRI had led to increased mortality. On 5 February, Lister replied, in The Lancet and the Glasgow Daily Herald, worried that the letter could damage the uptake of the new technique. Taking a more conciliatory tone, Lister addressed each point in turn.

=== Compound Dislocation Of The Ankle With Other Injuries ===
On 14 February 1870, Lister delivered a lecture at the Royal Infirmary that was later published in The Lancet as "Remarks On A Case Of Compound Dislocation Of The Ankle With Other Injuries; Illustrating The Antiseptic System Of Treatment". where he formally described his new protective that he developed the previous year, stating:

An antiseptic to exclude putrefaction with a protective to exclude the atmosphere will by their joint action, keep the wound from abnormal stimulus".

The paper describes how his understanding of wound treatment had evolved. In 1868, Lister stated that granulations were caused by an abnormal stimulus. By 1870, he now believed that if granulations were produced, protecting them from that stimulus using the protective would allow them to develop into "higher forms" i.e. new tissue, relatively quickly. But finding a theory to explain how wounds healed or didn't in a clot, that had been subject to antiseptics would take Lister the next 15 years to formulate. He called this "healing by scabbing", but it was unlike the healing process as seen by other surgeons of the day. Wounds that Lister treated always had a discharge and although he desired healing by organisation, healing by granulation was common in his operations.

On 26 June 1870, Syme had a second stroke and died. On 28 June 1870, an obituary to Syme was printed in The Scotsman that was attributed to Lister. In July 1870, the couple moved to 9 Charlotte Square in the New Town, Edinburgh. As befitting a victorian gentleman, staff at the new house included a bultler, a cook, junior staff and a coach man who drove the Landau.

=== Surgeon in Ordinary in Scotland ===
With the death of Syme, Listers reputation as the most preeminent surgeon in the United Kingdom, resulted in him becoming known to the President of the Royal College of Physicians Sir William Jenner. On 2 July 1870, Jenner recommended Lister to Queen Victoria, who appointed him as Surgeons-in-Ordinary in Scotland, putting him on-call when Queen Victoria was staying at Balmoral Castle in Aberdeenshire. The first royal patient Lister treated was Princess Louise, Duchess of Argyll, making several visits starting on 29 October 1870. Upon examining Prince Louise he found no inflammation and prescribed bed rest, resulting a complete recovery.

=== Improved protective ===
After a series of experiments between 5 July 1871 and 25 October 1871, Lister finally settled on oiled-silk coated on each side with gum copal that was then painted with a coating of dextrine, which enabled it to be wetted. The plaster was then soaked in carbolic acid, which was allowed to evaporate. The resulting plaster was much more effective in protecting the wound against the antiseptic dressing.

Lister's meticulous nature became ever more apparent in his casebooks for wards 4 and 5 at the infirmary.

On 14 January 1871, Lister published his first details of '"Gauze and Spray" in the British Medical Journal.

=== Bacteriology ===
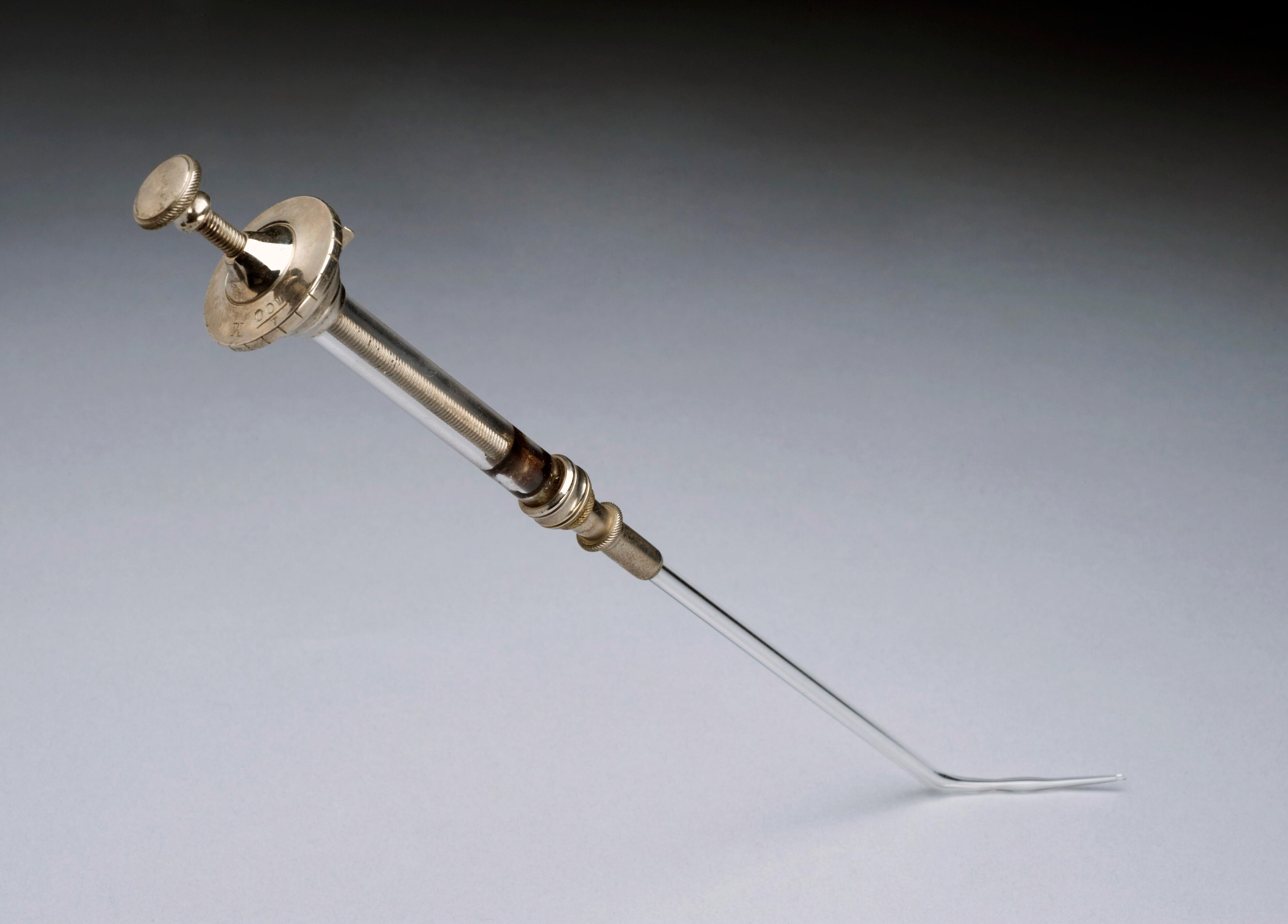
Micro-pipette used by Lister that dispensed a bacterial solution diluted to contain an average of "rather less than one bacterium" per drop

On 15 November 1871, Lister read a paper by the physiologist John Burdon-Sanderson that described three propositions that he found particularly interesting. Namely, that bacteria are conveyed by water but not air, how air could carry fungi but didn't carry bacteria, that bacteria can be killed by drying at a temperature of 100 °F (38 °C). Lister found the conclusions particularly important, considering them "striking" but "too good to be true", because if it was the case, then he wouldn't need to sterilize the atmosphere when practicing the antiseptic treatment. He stated:

Now, if these conclusions were strictly correct, they would affect my surgical practice in a most important manner. If it were true that the air does not contain the causes of putrefaction, then it would not be necessary for me, in carrying out the antiseptic system of treatment, to provide an antiseptic atmosphere. All that would be needful would be to purify the surface of the skin of the part to be operated upon by means of some efficient antiseptic, to have my own hands, and those of my assistants, and also the instruments, similarly purified; and then the operation might be performed without the antiseptic spray.

The following day he began a series of experiments in bacteriology that would span the next decade and produce 6 papers between 1871 and 1883, using urine as a growth medium. The urine he used for his experiment was collected from his patients by treating the skin around the urethra antiseptically and collecting the urine as it flowed out. In the first experiment he heated 6 wine glasses to a temperature above 100 °C (212 °F) and 6 plates to cover the wine glasses. Once cooled, urine was put in each glass. Two of the glasses received some tap water, a third received a little water. All glasses were covered with the plates except glass 6 that had no water added. After two days, Lister found that the first three glasses with water had bacteria in them while the other three didn't, results which were identical to Burdon-Sanderson experiment. However, Lister left an other glass with no water open for 12 and bacteria grew in urine. On the third day, he took plates from the remaining two glasses that didn't have water and within a few days, bacteria started to appear. The results proved to Lister that bacteria was indeed air-borne.

On 21 November Lister decided to repeat Burdon-Sanderson's experiment but more rigorously. Urine was collected in a glass flask with a cap which had been heated. Urine was quickly poured from the flask into four prepared wine glasses. The first two glass had separate square glass covers, while the second two had inverted porcelain evaporating dishes as covers. Both covers were also sterilised. The remaining urine in the flask was boiled for another 9 minutes. It was then passed into two glasses, the first with the urine solution and the second, urine and drop of tap water.

Illustrations of the many types of bacteria, moulds and fungi examined by Lister

Illustration of Penicillium glaucum, a filamentous fungal mold

Figure 2 is an illustration of Torula Cerevisiae, a species of the yeast fungus

Figure 3 describes the granular appearance of a Leptothrix bacteria's protoplasm with a distinct nucleus in each segment.

Figure 4 illustrates the ordinary mode of growth of bacteria, by the increase of the segments length-wise and transverse segmentation.

Figure 5 is a growth experiment in different mediums for a small granular organism that Lister named Granuligera. The organism would swell up in all directions, then segment into a block of pairs or fours.

Figure 6 is an illustration of the growth pattern of the fungus Torula Ovalis, now known as Xylohypha nigrescens in urine. The illustration describes how fungi have a different growth pattern to bacteria.

Figure 7. Further growth experiments of Torula, the first one over months, the second one, a regrowth experiment over several days in different solutions- comparing urine to pasteurs solution.

=== Sprays ===
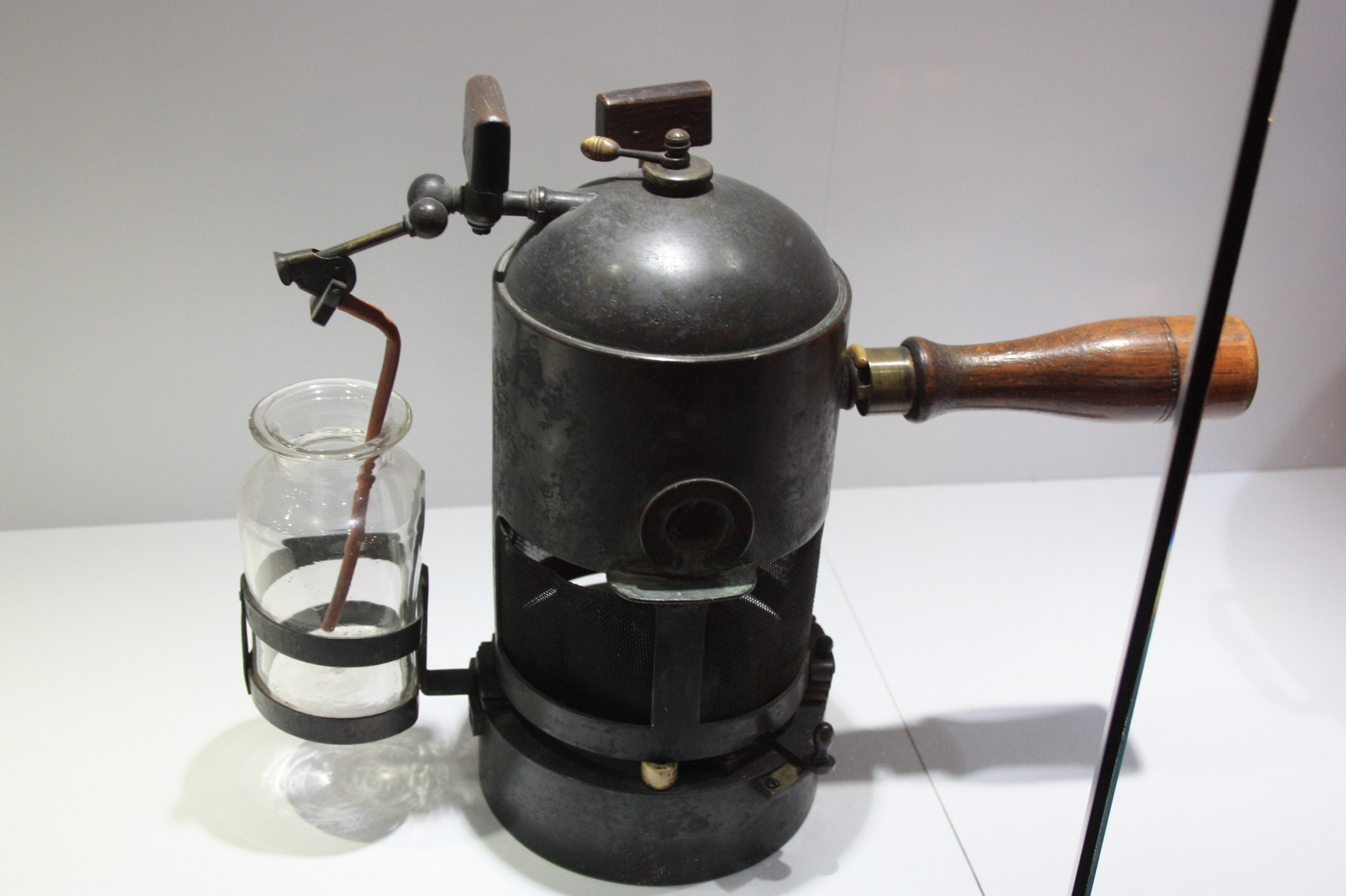
Lister's carbolic steam spray apparatus, Hunterian Museum, Glasgow

Therefore, Lister tested the results of spraying instruments, surgical incisions, and dressings with a solution of carbolic acid. Lister found that the solution swabbed on wounds remarkably reduced the incidence of gangrene.

Again, in 1873, the medical journal The Lancet warned the entire medical profession against his progressive ideas. However, Lister did have some supporters, including Marcus Beck, a consultant surgeon at University College Hospital, who practised Lister's antiseptic technique and also included it in the next edition of one of the main surgical textbooks of the time.

== London 1877–1900 ==
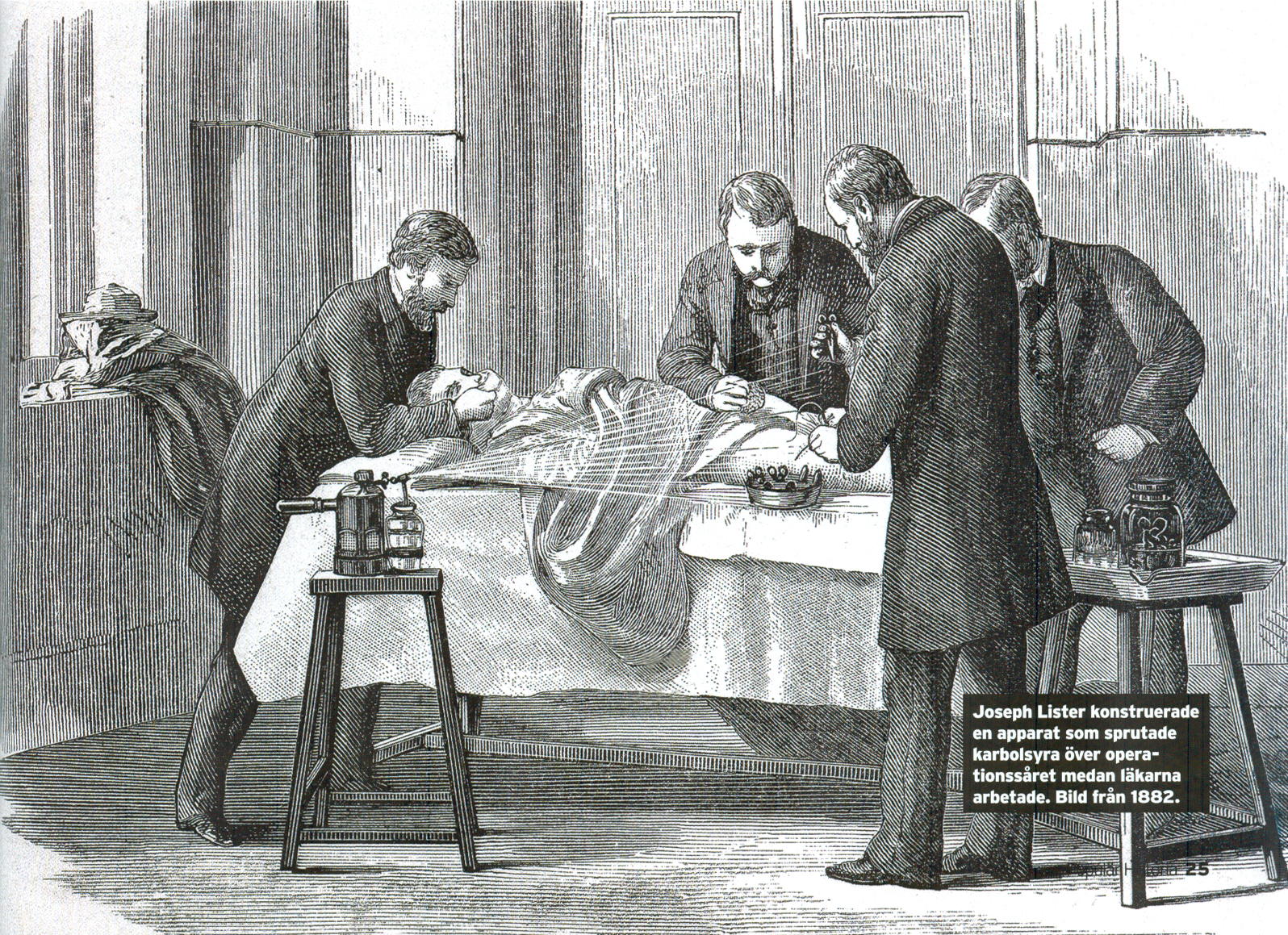
Lister spraying phenol over patient, 1882

On 10 February 1877, the Scottish surgeon Sir William Fergusson, Chair of Systematic Surgery at King's College Hospital, died. On 18 February, in reply to a tentative approach from a representative of Kings College, Lister stated that he would be willing to accept the chair if he could radically reform the teaching there. There was no doubt that Lister's mission was both evangelical and apostolic and this was his true purpose in moving to London.

British surgeon John Wood, who originally next in line, was elected to the chair. Wood was hostile to Lister obtaining the chair. On 8 March 1877, in a private letter to an associate, Lister contrasted their differing teaching methods and stated in no uncertain terms his opinion of Fergusson, "The mere fact of Fergusson having held the clinical chair is surely a matter of no great moment". In a comment to another colleague, Lister stated that his goal in taking the appointment was "the thorough working of the antiseptic system with a view to its diffusion in the Metropolis". At a memorial held by his students to persuade him to remain, Lister criticised London teaching. His impromptu speech was heard by a reporter who ensured that it was published in the London and Edinburgh newspapers. This jeopardised Lister's position, as word reached the governing council at King's College, who awarded the chair to John Wood a few weeks later.

However, negotiations were renewed in May and he was finally elected on 18 June 1877 to a newly created Chair of Clinical Surgery. The second Clinical Surgery Chair was created specifically for Lister because the hospital feared the negative publicity that would have resulted had Lister not been elected. Lister remained at King's College Hospital for sixteen years before retiring in 1893 following the death of his wife.

=== Moving to Regents Park ===
On 11 September 1877, Joseph and Aggie moved to London and found a John Nash designed house at 12 Park Crescent in Regent's Park. Lister began teaching on 1 October. The hospital made attendance at Lister's lectures mandatory for all students. Attendance was small, compared to the four hundred students who regularly attended his classes in Edinburgh. Lister's conditions of employment were met, but he was only provided with 24 beds, instead of the 60 beds that he was used to in Edinburgh. Lister stipulated that he should be able to bring from Edinburgh four people who would constitute the core of his new staff at the hospital. These were Watson Cheyne, who became his assistant surgeon, John Stewart, an anatomical artist and senior assistant, and W. H. Dobie and James Altham, Lister's dressers (surgical assistants who dressed wounds). There was considerable friction at Lister's first lecture, both from students who heckled him and staff. Even the nurses were hostile. This was clearly illustrated in October 1877 when a patient, Lizzie Thomas, who travelled from the Edinburgh Royal Infirmary to be treated for a Psoas abscess, was not admitted due to not having the correct paperwork. Lister could hardly believe that such a lack of sympathy from imperious nurses could exist. More so, such a state of mind was a real danger to his patients, because his system depended on loyal staff to carry out the preparations for antiseptic surgery.

=== Introductory address ===
On 1 October 1877, Lister held the customary introductory address. His inaugural lecture in London concerned "The nature of fermentation". Lister described the fermentation of milk and explained how putrefaction was caused by fermentation of blood and tried to prove that all fermentation was due to microorganisms. This was the first time since 1871 that Lister described his support for the theory that living germs caused disease. To demonstrate, he used a series of test tubes containing milk, loosely covered with glass caps. Although air had entered the test tubes and the milk had not decomposed, demonstrating that air was responsible for fermentation. The experiment had two conclusions, first that unboiled milk had no tendency to ferment and secondly that an organism that Lister had isolated, Bacterium lactis was the cause of lactic acid fermentation.

The address was badly received. St Clair Thomson, who entered King's College Hospital as a first-year student on the same day and attended this lecture, later recalled, that Lister's lecture on fermentation was received with indifference. In defence, John Stewart described it as: "a brilliant and most hopeful beginning of what we regarded as a campaign in the enemy's country... There seemed to be a colossal apathy, an inconceivable indifference to the light which, to our minds, shone so brightly, a monstrous inertia to the force of new ideas."

Medical items at Lister's inaugural lecture

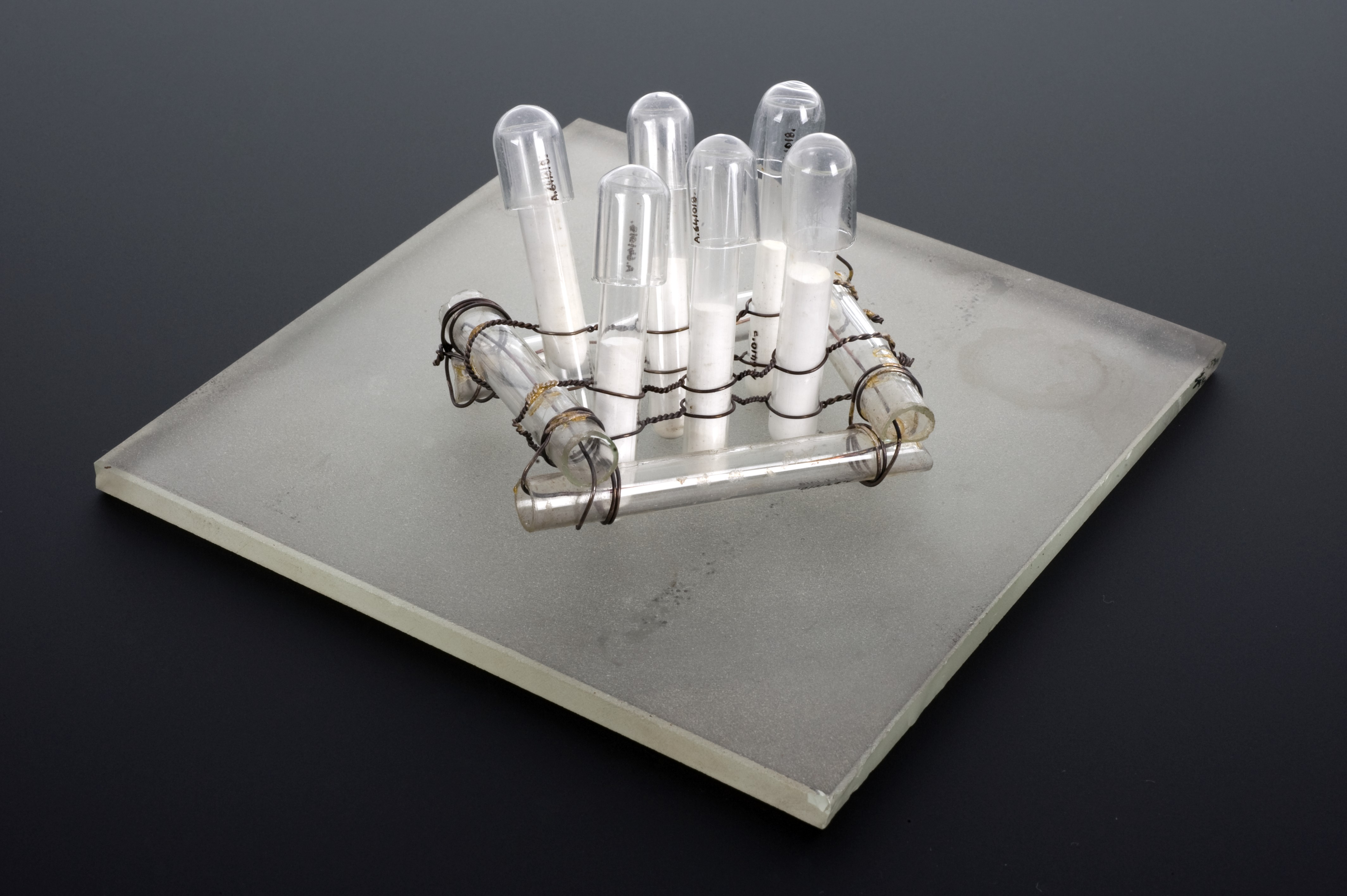
Test tubes containing milk. Lister was confident in saying that milk from the cow was not inherently fermentative.

=== Wiring of fractured patellas ===
In October 1877, Lister performed an operation on a patient, Francis Smith, that was not considered life-threatening. The open operation on a fractured patella, in front of 200 students, involved wiring the two fragments together and was likely the first time a healthy knee-joint was ever opened.

In October 1883, St Clair Thomson gathered together and examined Lister's first seven knee surgery patients at the Medical Society of London meeting.

== Reception abroad (1870–1876) ==
In 1869, Mathias Saxtorph from the University of Copenhagen visited Lister in Glasgow to adopt his methods. In July 1870, Saxtorph recognised Lister's technique as being effective in a letter to Lister where he stated:

The Frederick Hospital, to which I am head surgeon is a very old building and I have 150 patients in the surgical wards. Foremerly, there used to be every year several cases of death from pyaemia, sometime, arising from the most trivial injuries. Now, I have had the satisfaction that not a single case of pyaemia has occurred since I came home last year, which result is certainly owing to the introduction of your antiseptic treatment.

=== Germany ===
The first use of Lister's method in Germany was by Karl Thiersch in Leipzig in 1867. Thiersch practised Lister's approach since its introduction and never published his results, but did teach it to his students. His house surgeon Hermann Georg Joseph tested it on 16 patients with abscesses, with favourable results. Joseph wrote a thesis on his results, proving the value of the Lister method, and presented in Leipzig the following year. In January 1870, Heinrich Adolf von Bardeleben presented a paper to the Berlin Medical Society that described the results but provided no statistical evaluation of them.

The adoption of Listerism on the European continent halted during the Franco-Prussian War, but it became the greatest opportunity to advance Lister's ideas. At the start of the war, Lister had written a pamphlet known as "A Method of Antiseptic Treatment Applicable To Wounded Soldiers in the Present War" that described a simplified technique of antiseptic that could be used on the battlefield and military hospital. The pamphlet was immediately translated into German, but never made a material difference.

By far the most important advocate for Lister's antiseptic system in Germany was surgeon and osteotomy specialist Richard von Volkmann, who taught at the University of Halle. In August 1870, he became surgeon-general during the Franco-Prussian War and was responsible for 12 army hospitals and 1442 beds. When he returned to his own hospital in the winter of 1871, he found large numbers of patients with infectious diseases throughout the ward. He wrote of the experience:

The mortality after large amputations and complicated fractures grew year by year. In the summer of 1871, during my absence on the battlefield, the clinic was crowded by a large amount of injured. For eight months, in the winter of 1871 to 1872, the numbers of blood poisoning and rose disease victims were so great, that I considered applying for a temporary closure of the facility. Without a morgue, the dead stayed in the cellar beneath the wards

In 1872, Volkmann sent his assistant Max Schede to visit Lister at his clinic, to learn his new techniques. Once Schede returned in the autumn of 1872, Volkmann began to use Lister's new techniques. On 16 February 1873, in a letter to Theodor Billroth, Volkmann wrote:

since autumn of last year (1872), I have been experimenting with Lister's method... Already, the first trials in the old 'contaminated' house, show wounds healing, uneventful, without fever and pus.

In April 1874, Volkmann presented a lecture titled: "About antiseptic occlusive bandages and their influence on the healing process of wounds" where he detailed the influence of Lister. The lecture became famous in Germany, to such an extent that Lister's antiseptics were established in Germany, faster than in any other developed country. At the German Congress of Surgery, the members were so enthused with the results of Lister's work, that they invited him to visit Germany and see first-hand the results of his work. Lister decided to accept the invitation to a continental tour.

In the spring of 1875, Lister along with Agnes, his sister-in-law and two nieces left Edinburgh. The group spent several weeks in a tour that began in Cannes in France, visited several cities in Italy and finished with a four-day visit to Venice. The first place in Germany that Lister visited was the "Allgemeines Krankenhaus" (general hospital) in Munich, which was run by Nussbaum. A celebratory dinner was held in Munich for Lister, with 70 guests. Lister received his most glorious reception in Leipzig, where Karl Thiersch held a banquet for 300–400 guests. Lister then visited Volkmann in Halle before visiting Berlin, where the group was entertained by Heinrich Adolf von Bardeleben, who worked at the Charité hospital and was one of the earliest adopters of antiseptics.

== Later life ==
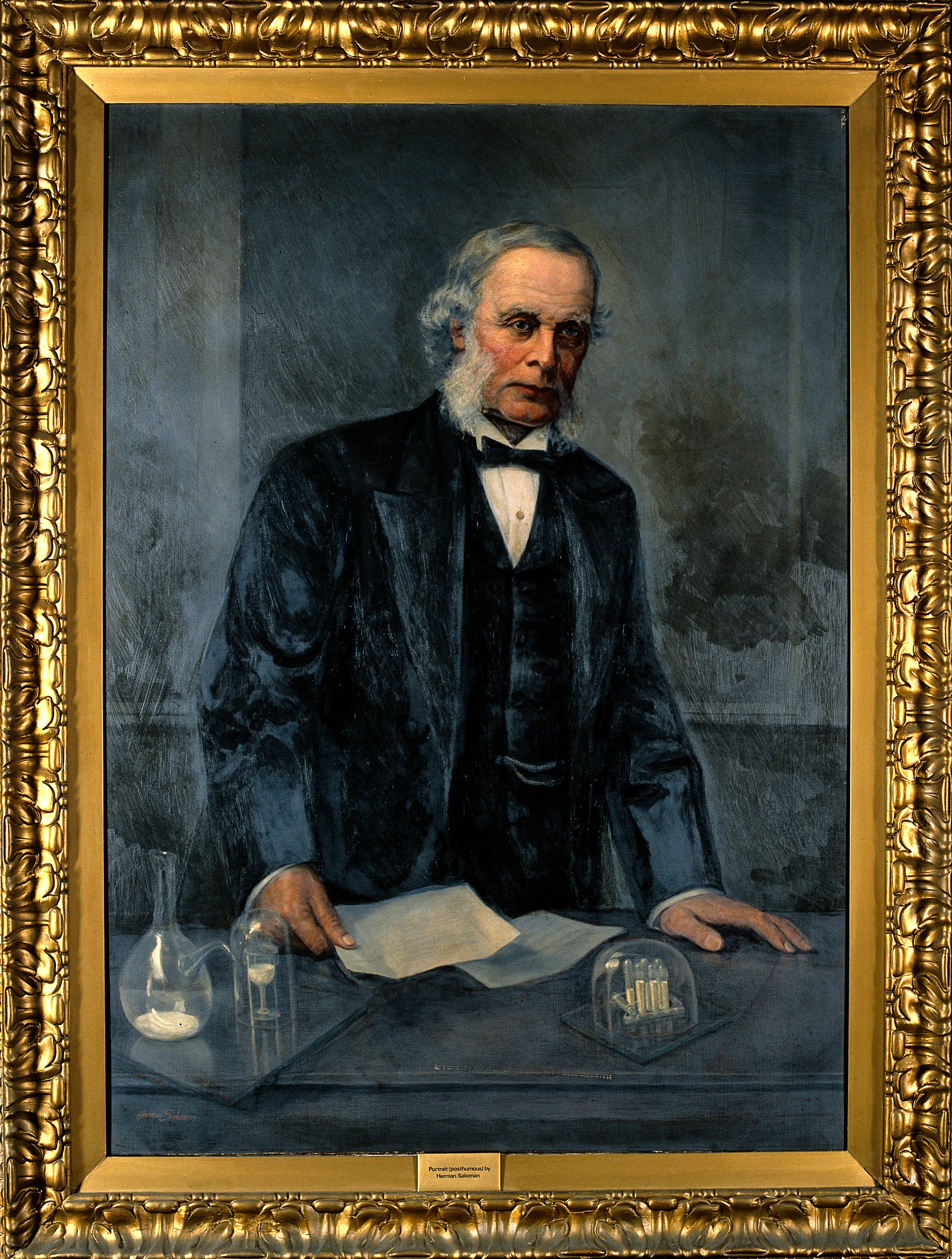
Portrait of Lister by Harry Herman Salomon from a photograph. Commissioned by Henry Wellcome

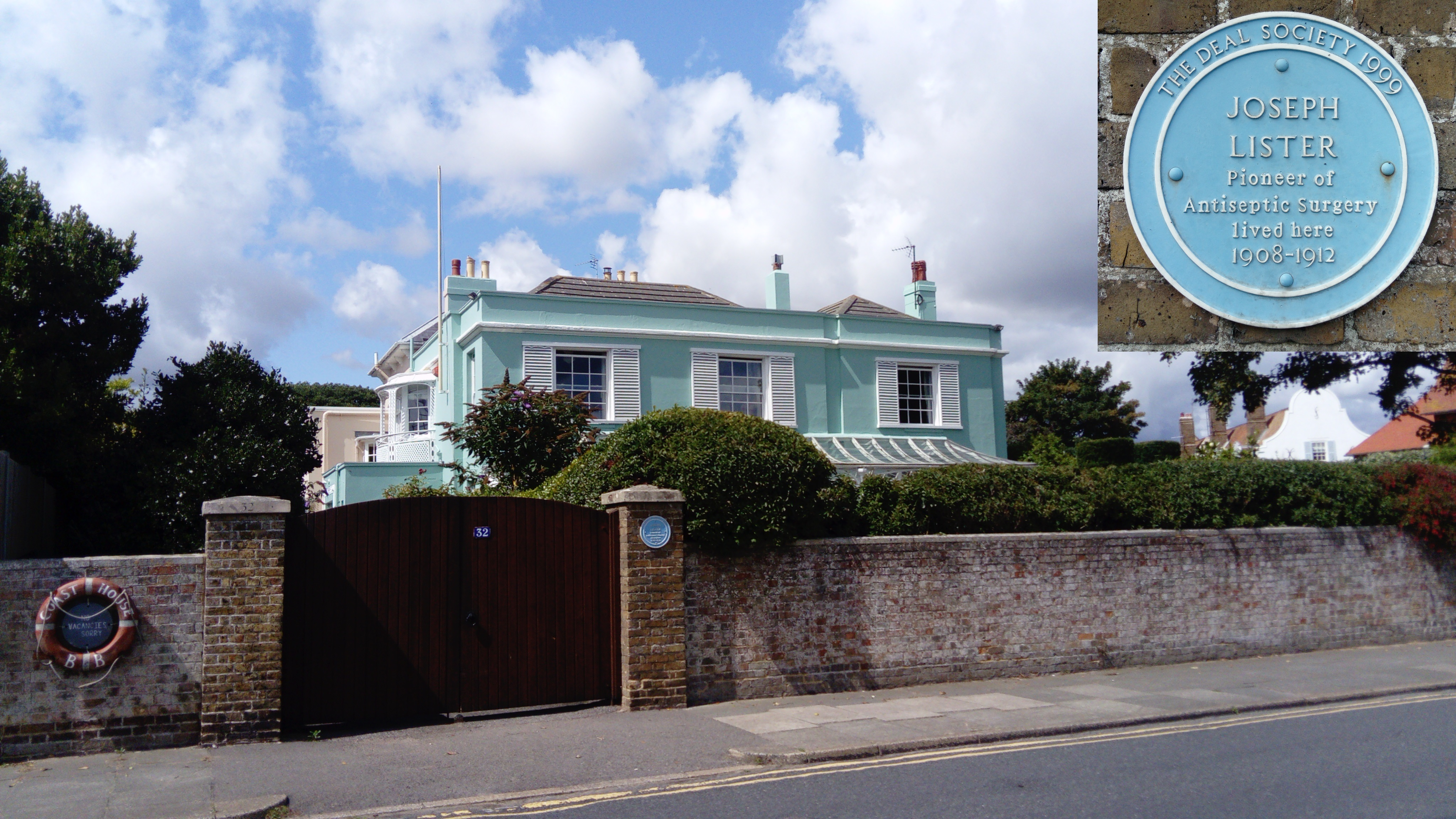
Coast House in Deal, Kent with its blue plaque to Lister

In December 1892, Lister attended a celebration of the 70th birthday of Pasteur at the Sorbonne in Paris, The theatre, designed to hold 2,500 people, was crowded. The audience included the university governing staff, ministers of state, ambassadors, President of France Sadi Carnot, and representatives from the Institut de France. Lister, invited to give the address, received a great ovation when he stood up. He spoke of the debt that he and surgery owed to Pasteur. In a scene captured later by Jean-André Rixens, Pasteur strode forward and kissed Lister on both cheeks. In January 1896, Lister was present when Pasteur's body was laid in his tomb at the Pasteur Institute.

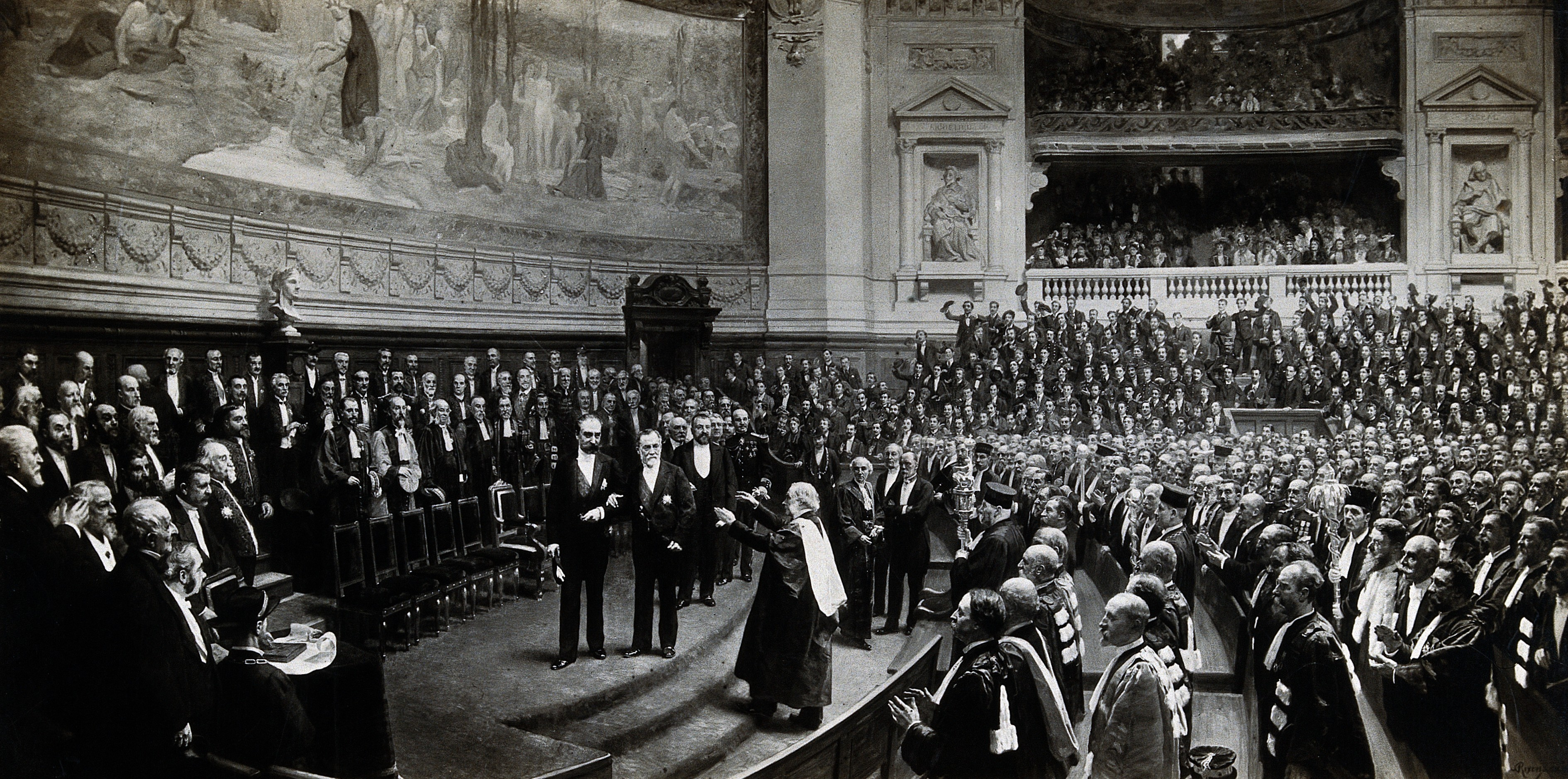
Joseph Lister acclaims Louis Pasteur at Pasteur's Jubilee, Paris, 1892. Photograph after a painting by Jean-André Rixens

In 1893, four days into a spring holiday in Rapallo, Agnes Lister died from acute pneumonia. While still responsible for the wards at King's College Hospital, Lister's private practice ceased along with an appetite for experimental work. He severely curtailed social gatherings, studying and writing lost appeal for him, and he sank into religious melancholy. Lister retired from King's College Hospital in 1893. Lister was presented with a portrait painted by Scottish artist John Henry Lorimer, in a small presentation, held in recognition of the affection and esteem that felt by his colleagues.

Despite suffering a stroke, he still came into the public light from time to time. He had for several years been a Surgeon Extraordinary to Queen Victoria, and from March 1900 was appointed the Serjeant Surgeon to the Queen, thus becoming the senior surgeon in the Medical Household of the Royal Household of the sovereign. After her death the following year, he was re-appointed as such to her successor, King Edward VII.

In 1902, King Edward developed appendicitis just before his scheduled coronation. By 24 June, two days before the ceremony, he had a 10-day history of symptoms including with a distinct mass on the right lower quadrant. Edward was operated on by Sir Frederick Treves. Like all internal surgery at the time, appendectomy still posed an extremely high risk of death by post-operational infection, and Treves did not dare operate on the King without consulting Britain's leading surgical authority. Lister obligingly advised on the latest antiseptic surgical methods (which were followed to the letter). The King survived, later telling Lister, "I know that if it had not been for you and your work, I wouldn't be sitting here today."

In 1908, Lister left London to live in the coastal village of Walmer at Park House.

=== Death ===
Lord Lister died on 10 February 1912 at his country home at the age of 84. The first part of Lister's funeral was a large public service held at Westminster Abbey, which took place at 1.30 p.m. on 16 February 1912. His body was moved from his house and taken to the Chapel of St. Faith and a wreath of orchids and lilies was placed by the German ambassador Count Paul Wolff Metternich on behalf of the German Emperor Wilhelm II. Before the start of the service, Frederick Bridge played the music of Henry Purcell, the funeral march by Chopin and Beethoven's Tres Aequili. The body was then placed on a high catafalque, where his Order of Merit, Prussian Pour le Mérite, and Grand Cross of the Order of the Dannebrog were placed. It was then borne by several pallbearers including John William Strutt, Archibald Primrose, Rupert Guinness, Archibald Geikie, Donald MacAlister, Watson Cheyne, Godlee, and Francis Mitchell Caird to a hearse, which conveyed the catafalque to Hampstead Cemetery in London, reaching it at 4 p.m. Lister's body was then buried in a plot in the south-east corner of the central chapel, attended by a small group of his family and friends. Many tributes from learned societies all over the world were published in The Times on that day. A memorial service was held in St Giles' Cathedral in Edinburgh on the same day. Glasgow University held a memorial service in Bute Hall on 15 February 1912.

A marble medallion of Lister was placed in the north transept of Westminster Abbey, which sits alongside four other noted men of science, Darwin, Stokes, Adams, and Watt.

Lister's funeral and medallion

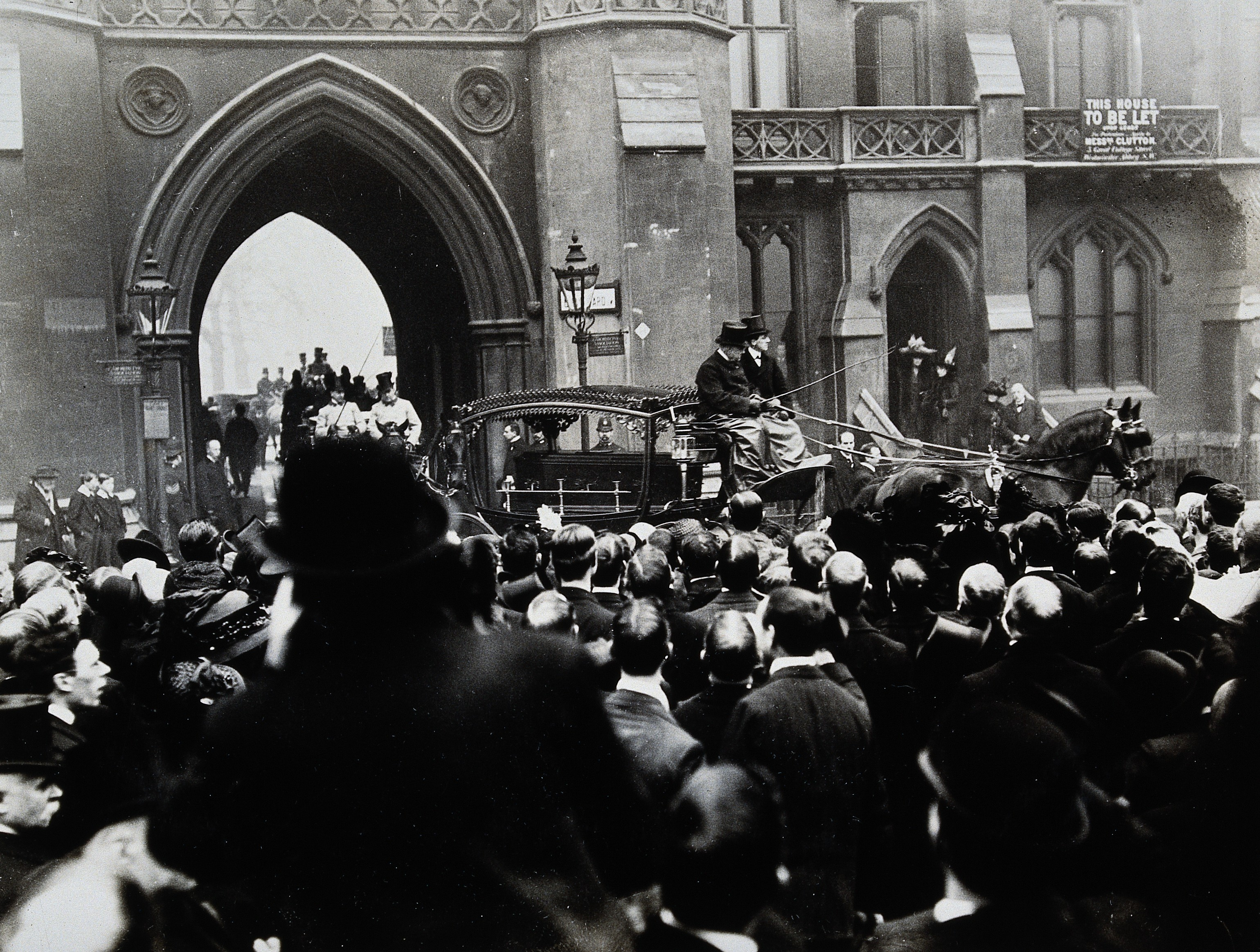
Joseph Lister, Baron Lister's funeral procession leaving Westminster Abbey

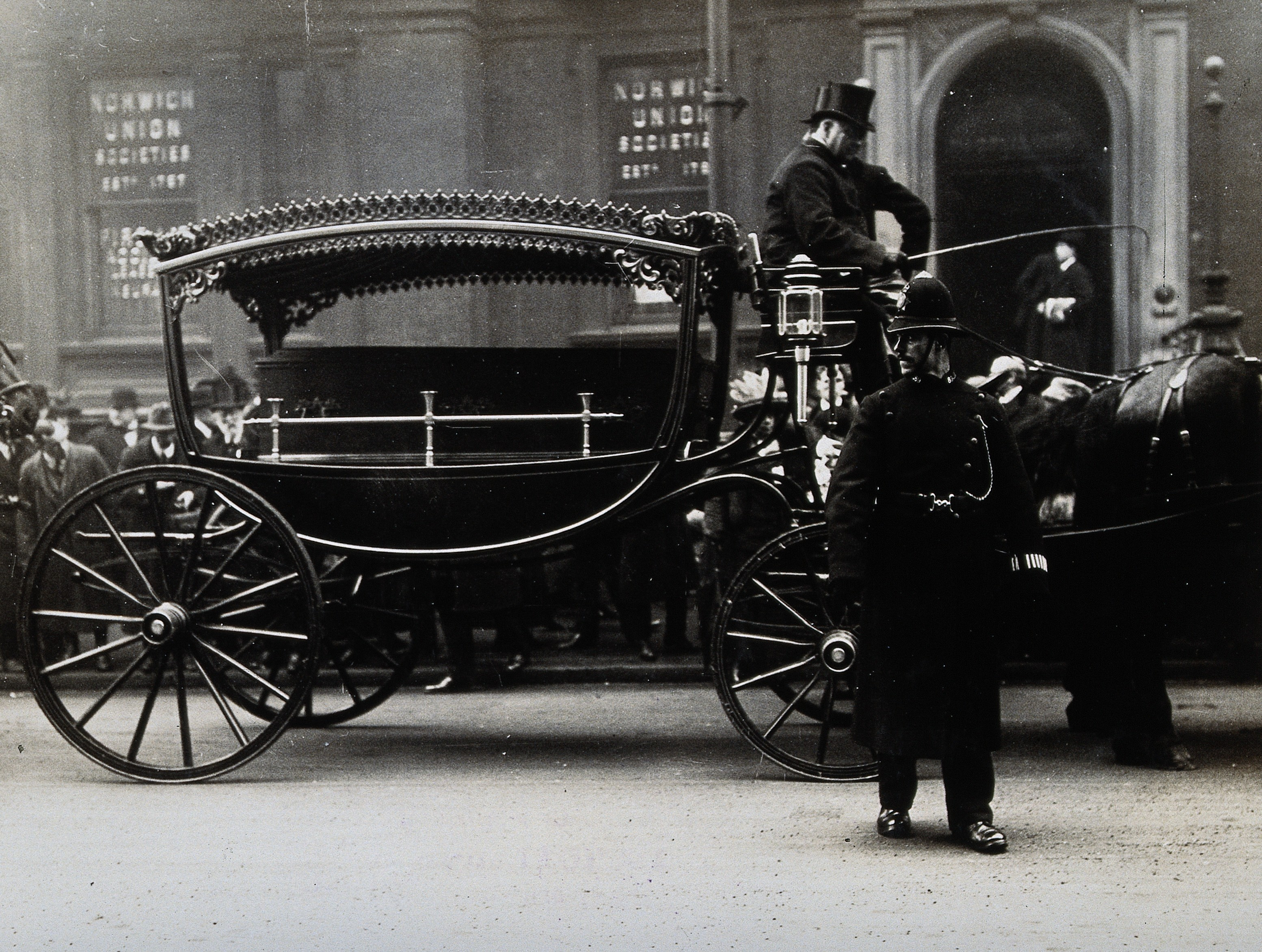
Lister's hearse prior to his funeral service at Westminster Abbey

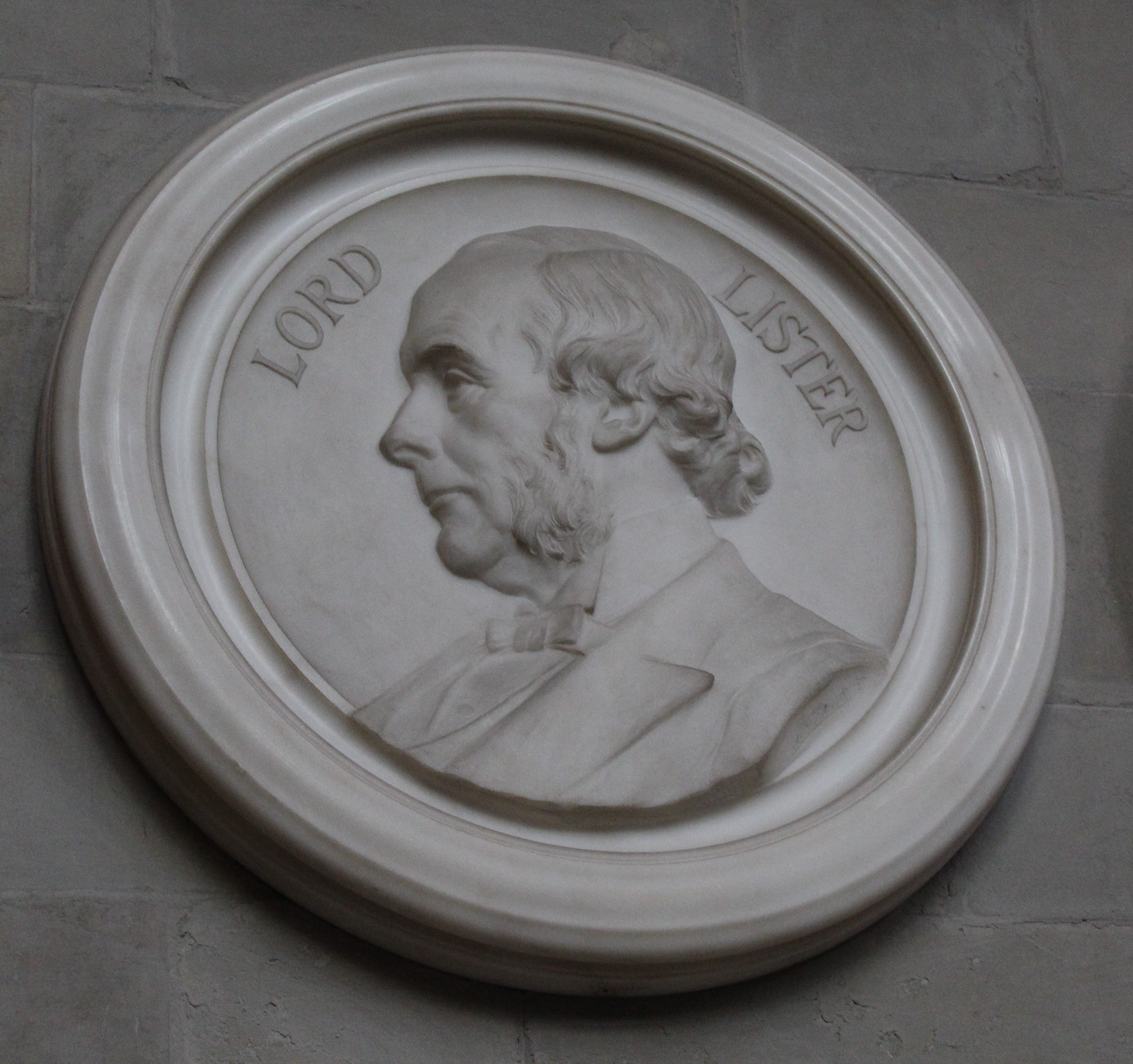
Memorial plaque in marble to Lister by Thomas Brock in 1915

== Lister Memorial Fund ==
Following his death, the Lord Lister Memorial Fund was established by the Royal Society as a public subscription to raise monies for the public good in honour of Lord Lister. It led to the founding of the Lister Medal, considered the most prestigious prize that can be awarded to a surgeon.

== Awards and honours ==
On 26 December 1883, Queen Victoria created Lister a baronet, of Park Crescent in the parish of St Marylebone in the county of Middlesex.

In 1885, he was awarded the Pour le Mérite, the highest Prussian order of merit. The order was restricted to 30 living Germans and as many foreigners.

Escutcheon of Baron Lister

On 8 February 1897, he was further honoured when Her Majesty raised him to the peerage as Baron Lister, of Lyme Regis in the county of Dorset.

In the 1902 Coronation Honours list published on 26 June 1902 (the original day of King Edward VII's coronation), Lord Lister was appointed a privy counsellor and one of the original members of the new Order of Merit (OM). He received the order from the King on 8 August 1902, and was sworn a member of the Privy Council at Buckingham Palace on 11 August 1902. In December 1902, the King of Denmark bestowed upon Lister the Knight of the Grand Cross of the Order of the Dannebrog, an Order of chivalry that gave him more pleasure than any of his later honours.

Lister's coat of arms, order of chivalry and orders of merit

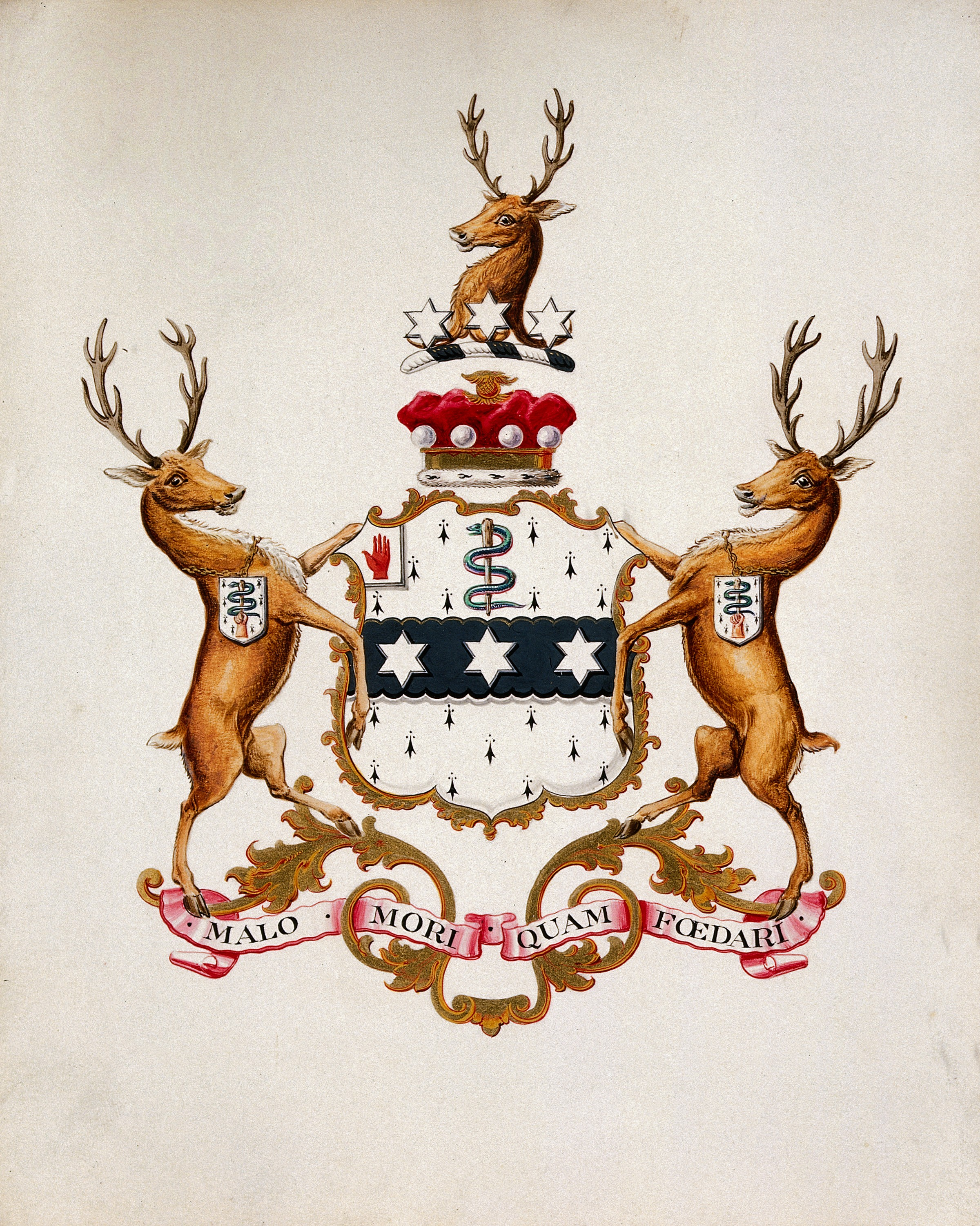
Arms of Lord Lister: Ermine, on a fess invected sable three mullets of six points argent in chief a Staff of Aesculapius erect proper with canton of a baronet, Red Hand of Ulster

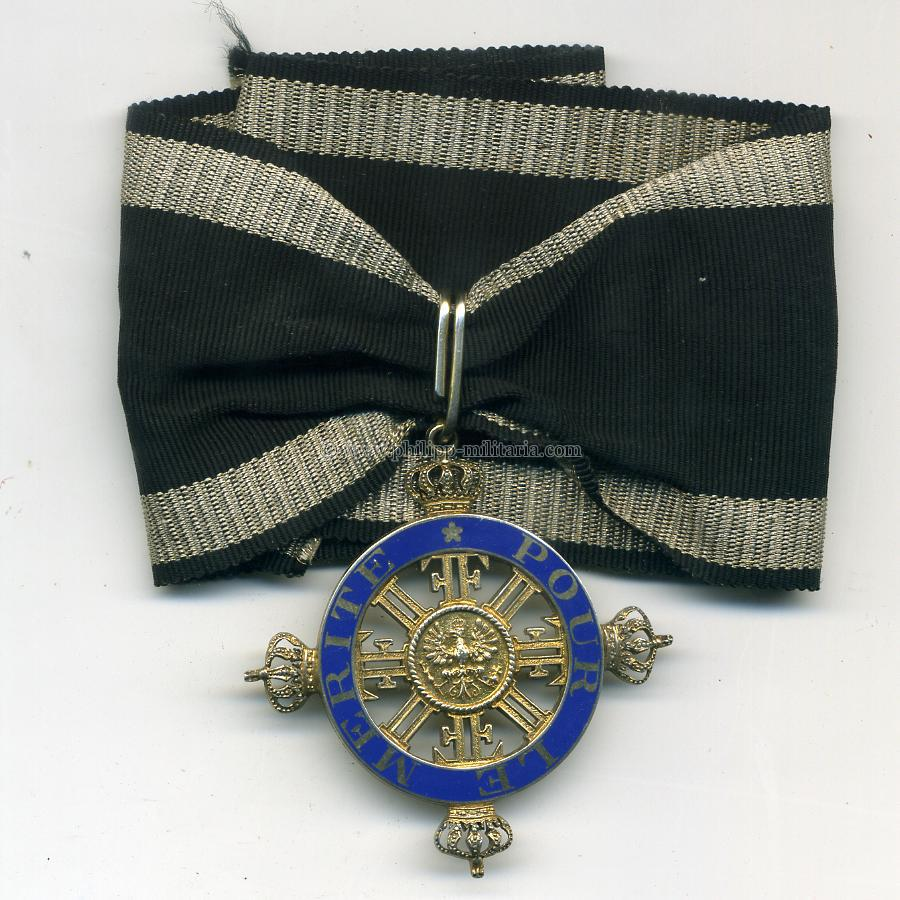
Pour le mérite, awarded in 1885

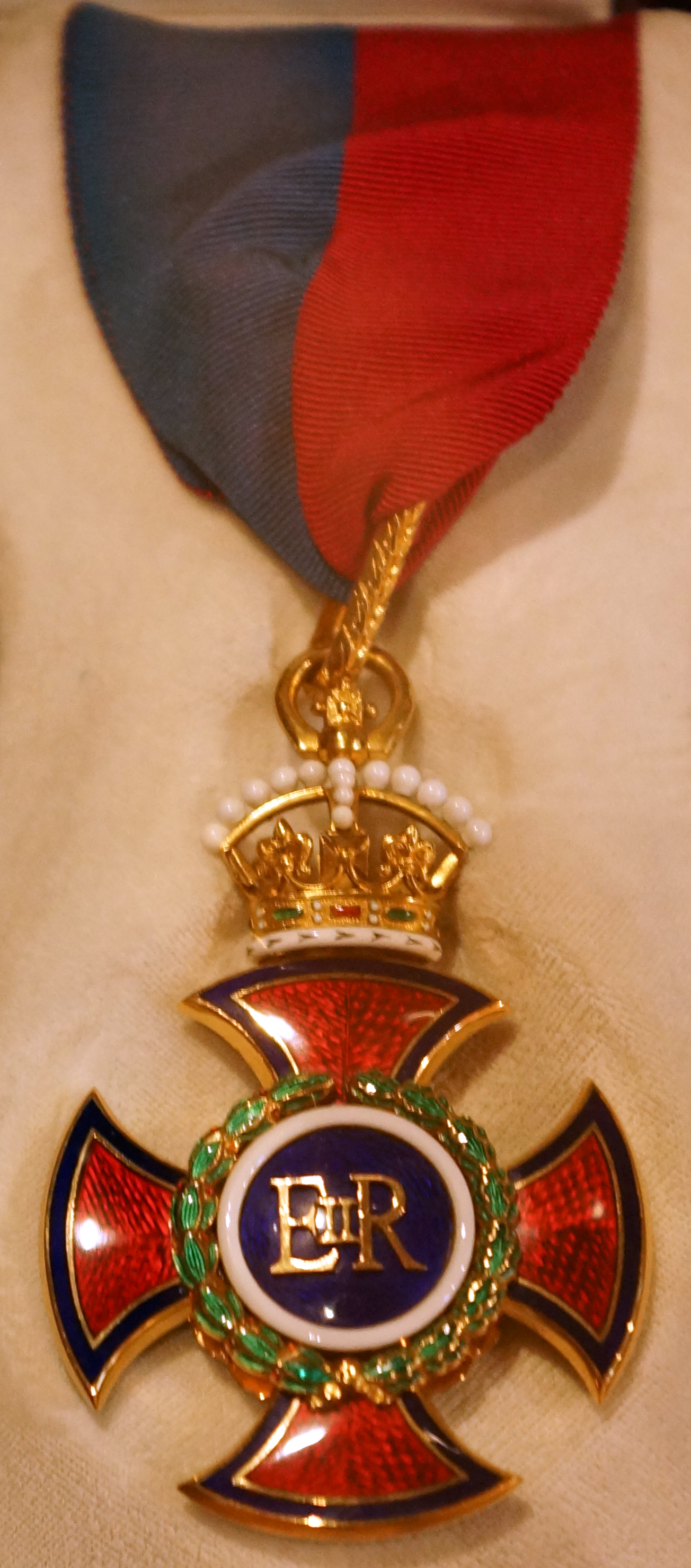
Order of merit, awarded in 1902

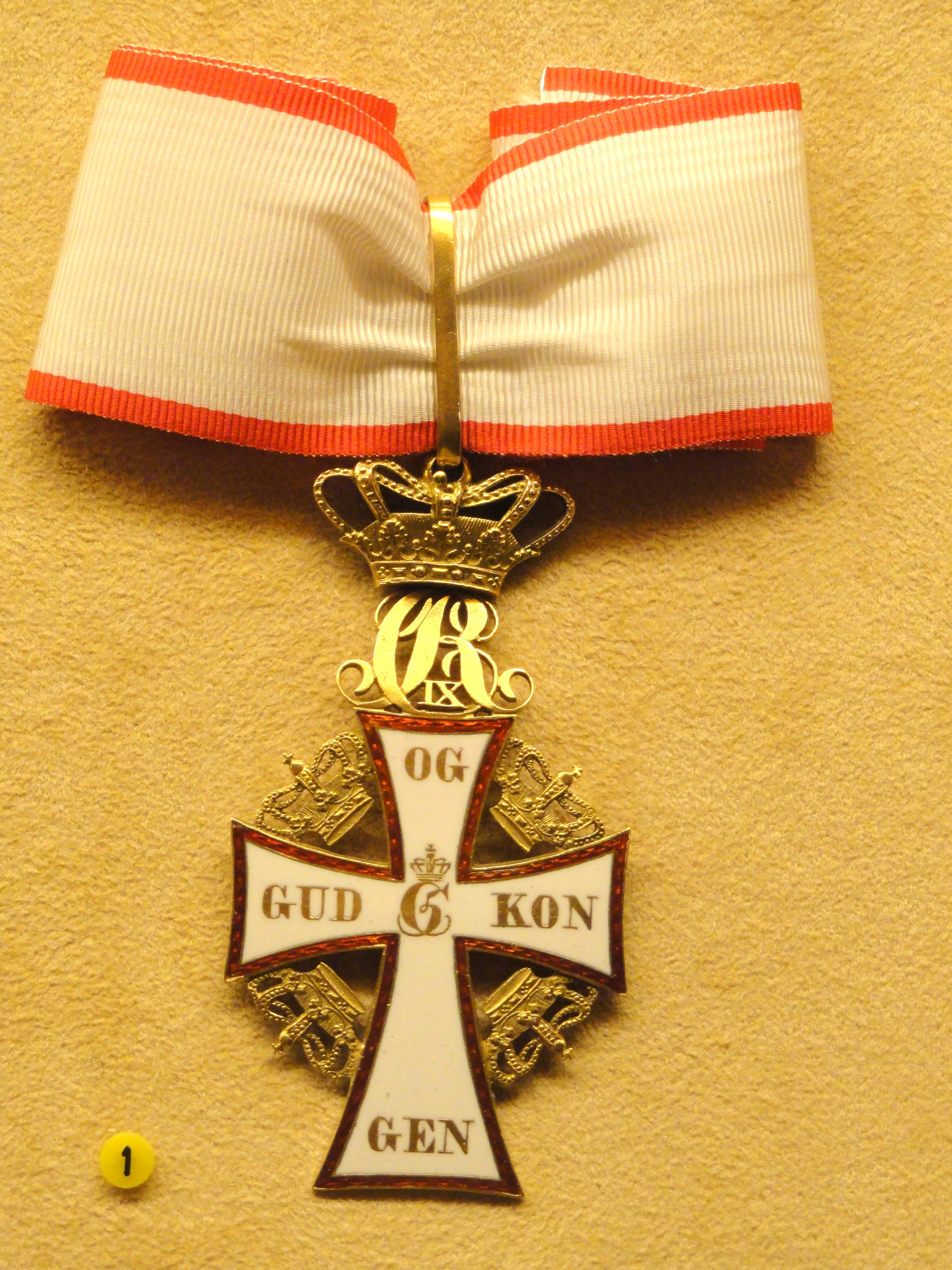
Grand Cross, Order of the Dannebrog, awarded in 1902

=== Medals ===
Throughout his life, Lister was awarded a number of medals for his achievements.

In May 1890, Lister was awarded the Cameron Prize for Therapeutics of the University of Edinburgh, that included the delivery of a short oration or lecture, that was held at the Synod Hall in Edinburgh. In November 1902, Lister was awarded the Copley Medal by the Royal Society "for sustained, outstanding achievements in any field of science".

=== Academic societies ===
Lister was a member of the Royal College of Surgeons of England between 1880 and 1888.

In 1877, Lister was awarded the Cothenius Medal of the German Society of Naturalists. In 1886, he was elected vice president of the college, but declined the nomination for office of president, as he wished to devote his remaining time to further research. In 1887, Lister presented the Bradshaw lecture with a lecture titled "On the Present Position of Antiseptic Treatment in Surgery". In 1897, Lister was awarded the College Gold Medal, their highest honour.

Lister was elected to the Royal Society in 1860. He served as a trustee on the Royal Society council between 1881 and 1883. Ten years later, in November 1893 Lister was elected for two years, to the position of foreign secretary of the society, succeeding the Scottish geologist Sir Archibald Geikie. In 1895, he was elected president of the Royal Society succeeding Lord Kelvin. He held the position until 1900.

In March 1893, Lister received a telegram from Pasteur, Félix Guyon and Charles Bouchard that informed him he had been elected an associate of the Académie des Sciences.

Lister was elected an International Honorary Member of the American Academy of Arts and Sciences in 1893, an International Member of the American Philosophical Society in 1897, and an International Member of the United States National Academy of Sciences.

=== Monuments and legacy ===
In 1903, the British Institute of Preventive Medicine was renamed Lister Institute of Preventive Medicine in honour of Lister. The building, along with another adjacent building, forms what is now the Lister Hospital in Chelsea, which opened in 1985. The building at Glasgow Royal Infirmary which houses the cytopathology, microbiology, and pathology departments was named in Lister's honour to recognise his work at the hospital. The Lister Hospital in Stevenage, Hertfordshire is named after him.

Lister's name is one of 23 people featured on the frieze of the London School of Hygiene & Tropical Medicine – although the committee which chose the names to include on the frieze did not provide documentation about why certain names were chosen and others were not.

Monuments erected in Lister's honour

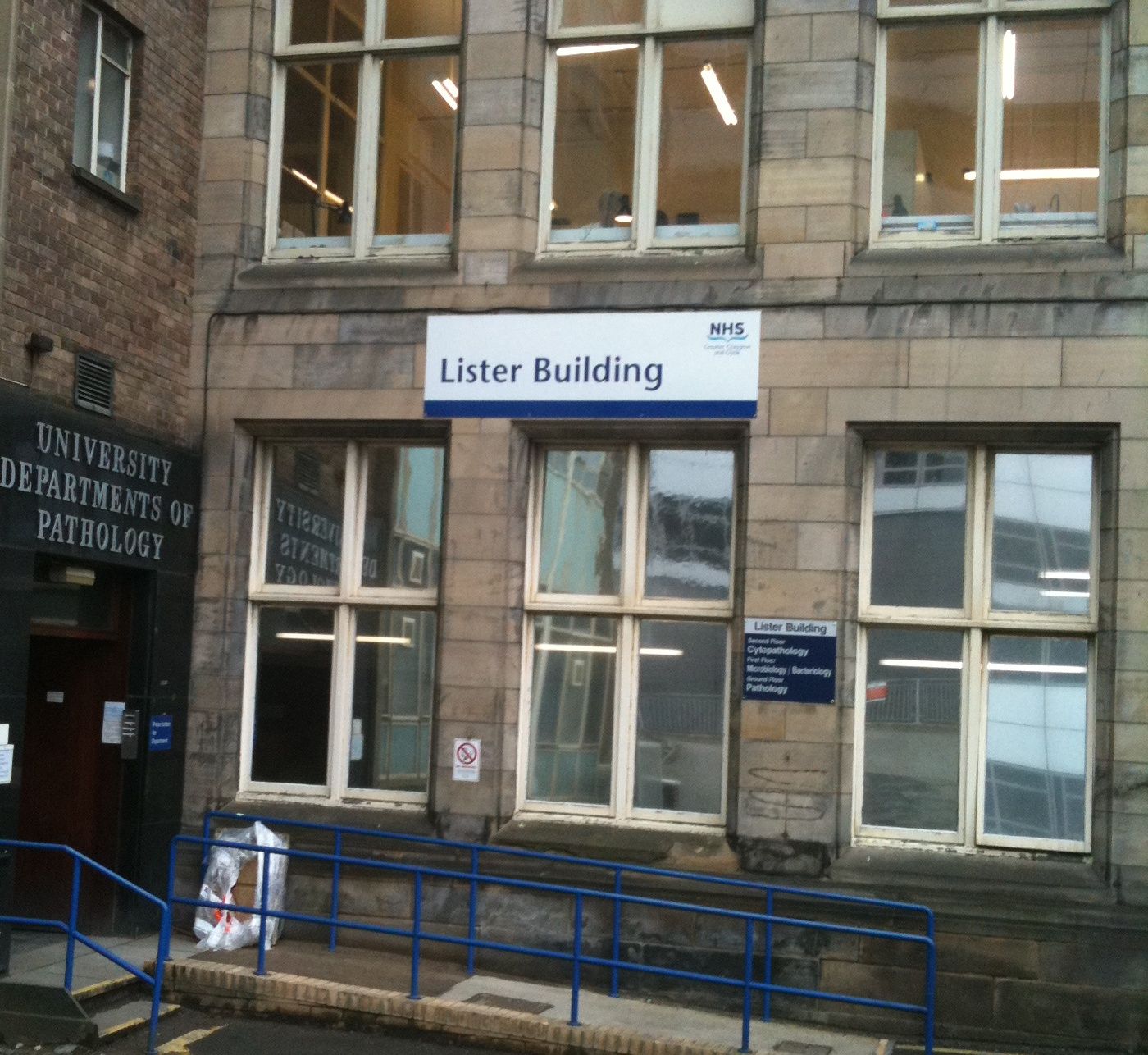
Lister Building at the Glasgow Royal Infirmary

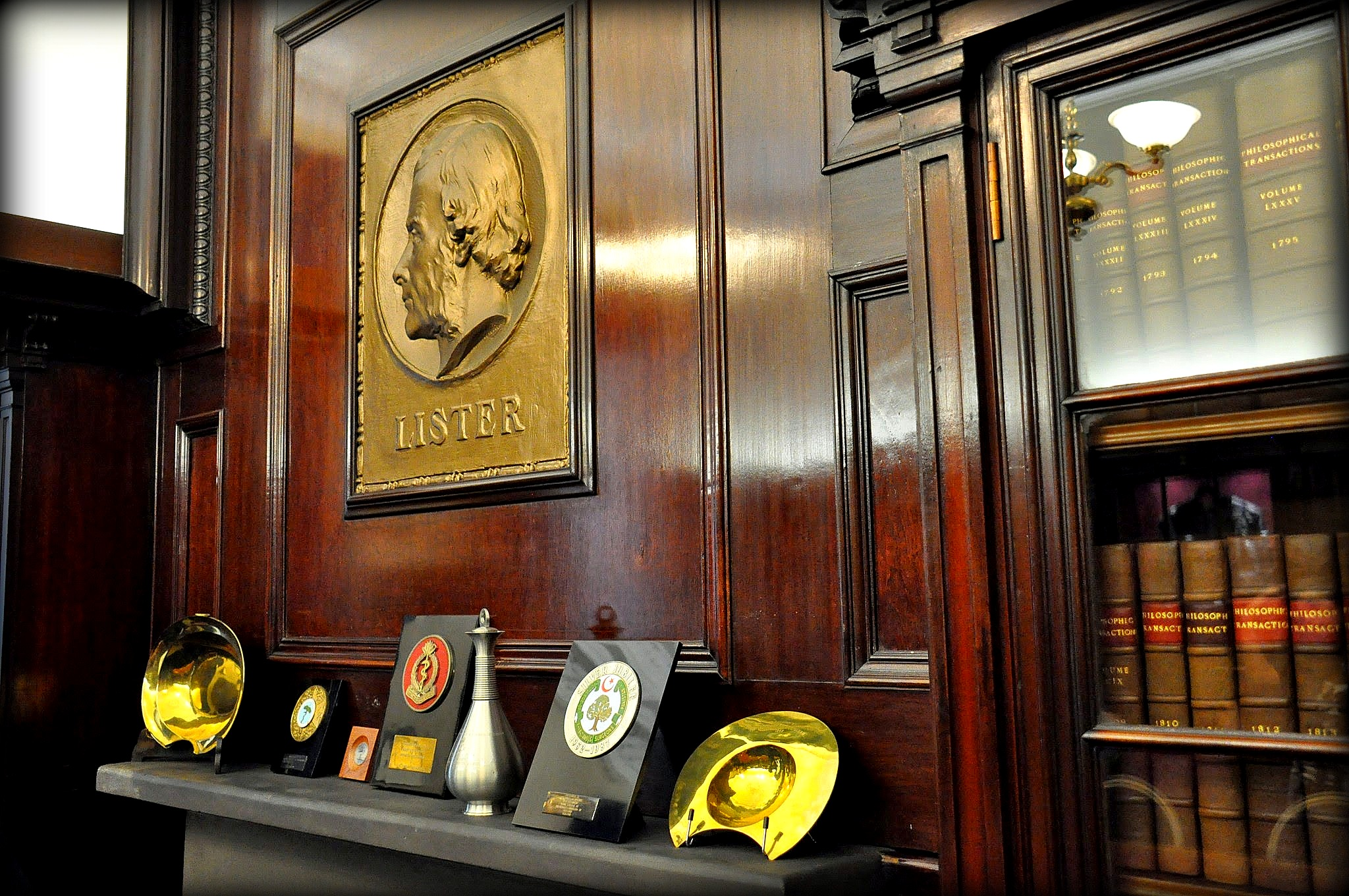
Lister Room, Royal College of Physicians and Surgeons of Glasgow

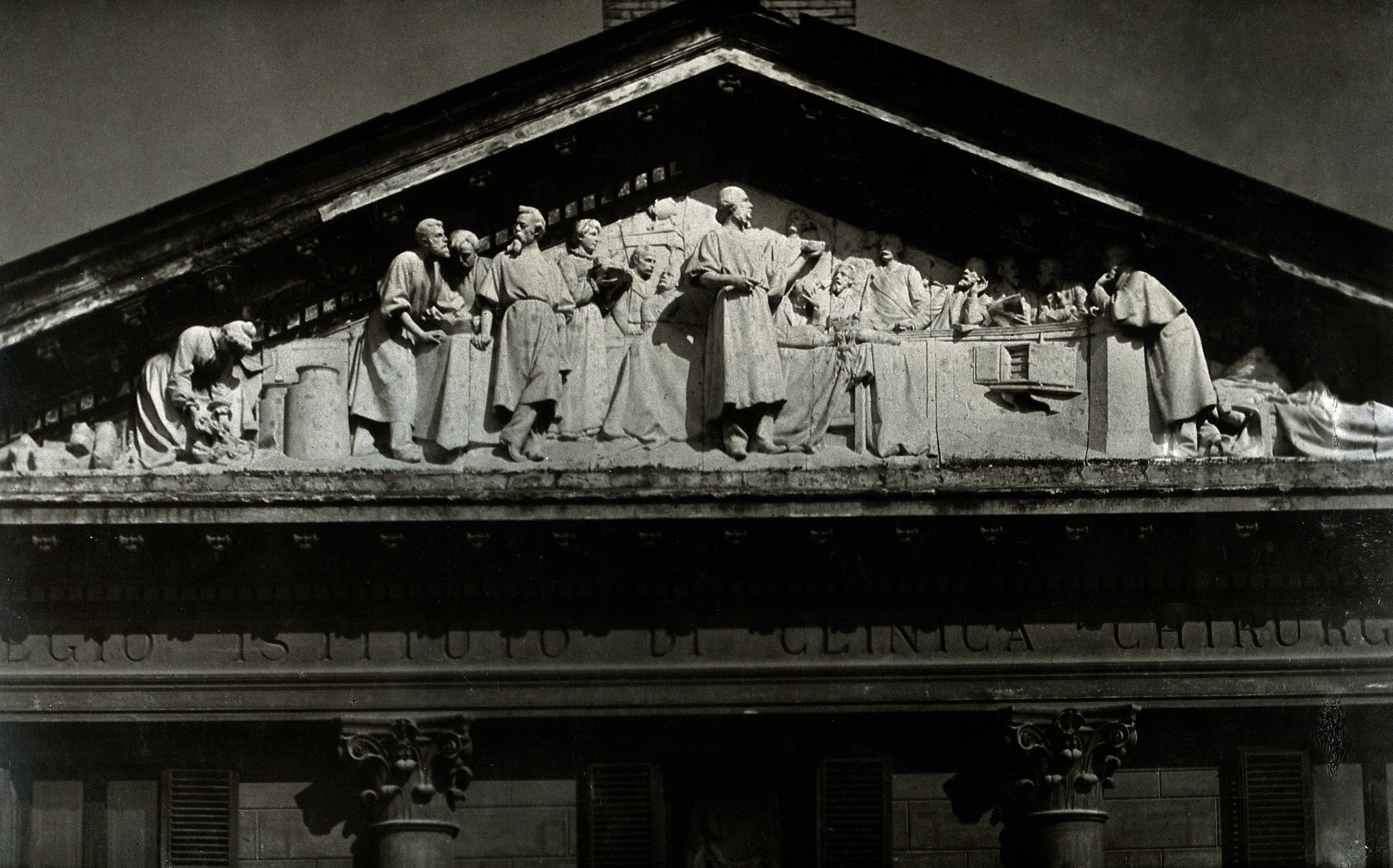
Lister Frieze, Polyclinic Umberto I hospital in Rome. The tympanum sculptures show Lister operating.

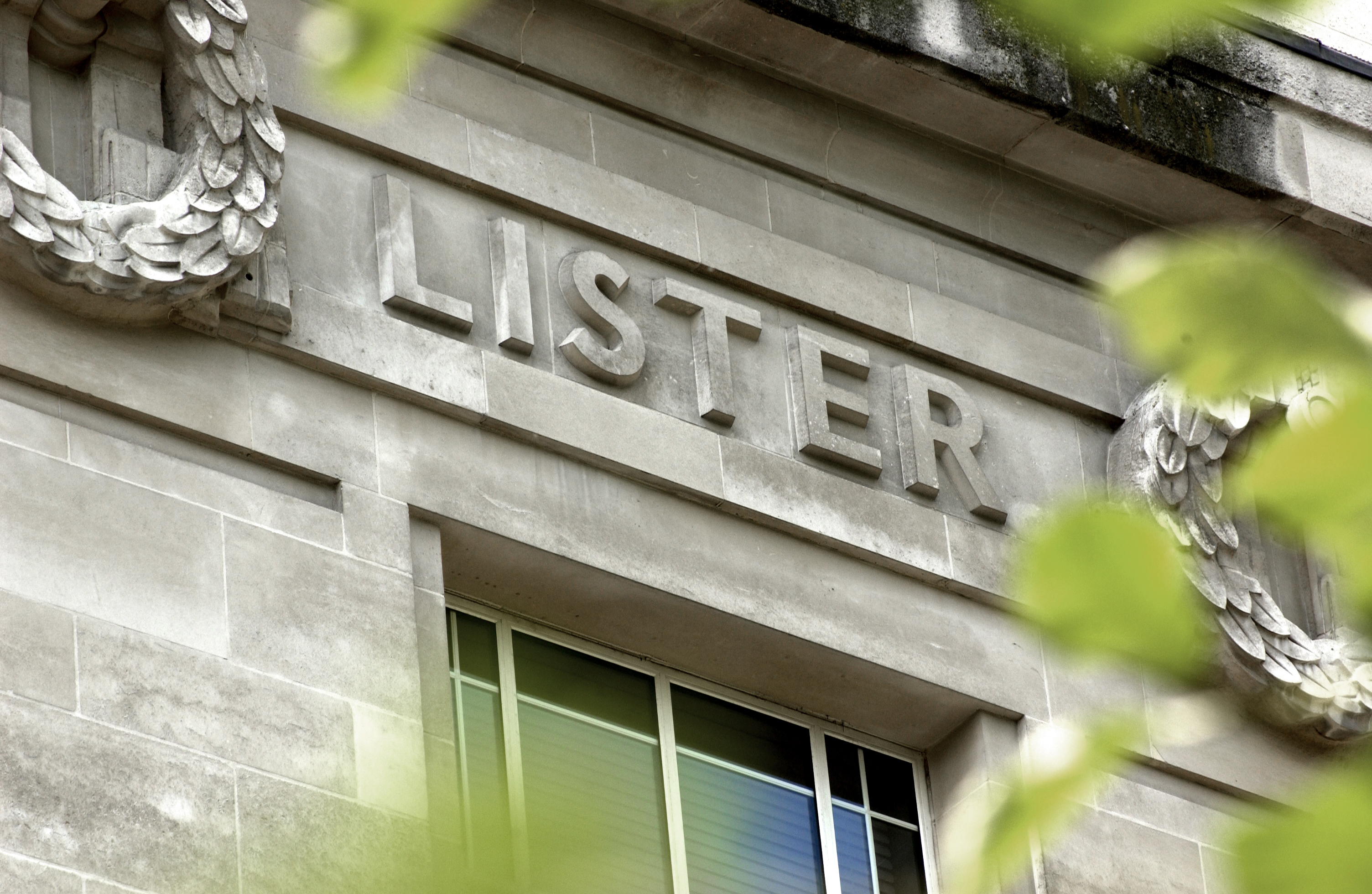
Image of Lister's name on the London School of Hygiene & Tropical Medicine, in Keppel Street

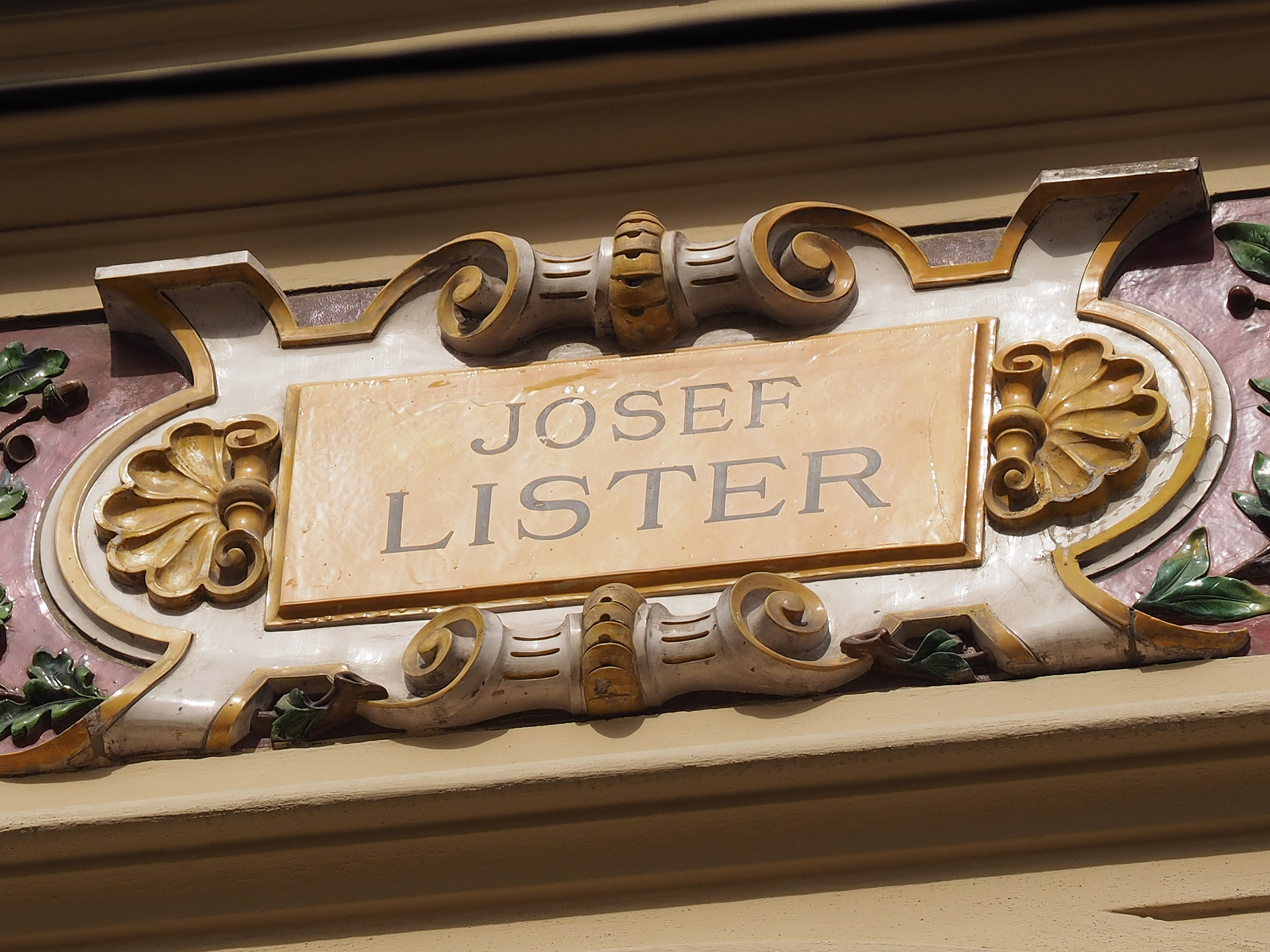
Plaque commemorating Joseph Lister on the facade of the polyclinic in Vienna

Only two British surgeons have public monuments in London, Lister and John Hunter. The statue of Lister, created by Thomas Brock in bronze in 1924, stands at the north end of Portland Place. A bronze statue of Lister, mounted on a granite base in Glasgow's Kelvingrove Park, was sculpted by George Henry Paulin in 1924. It sits next to a statue of Lord Kelvin.

Statues and plaques in Lister's honour

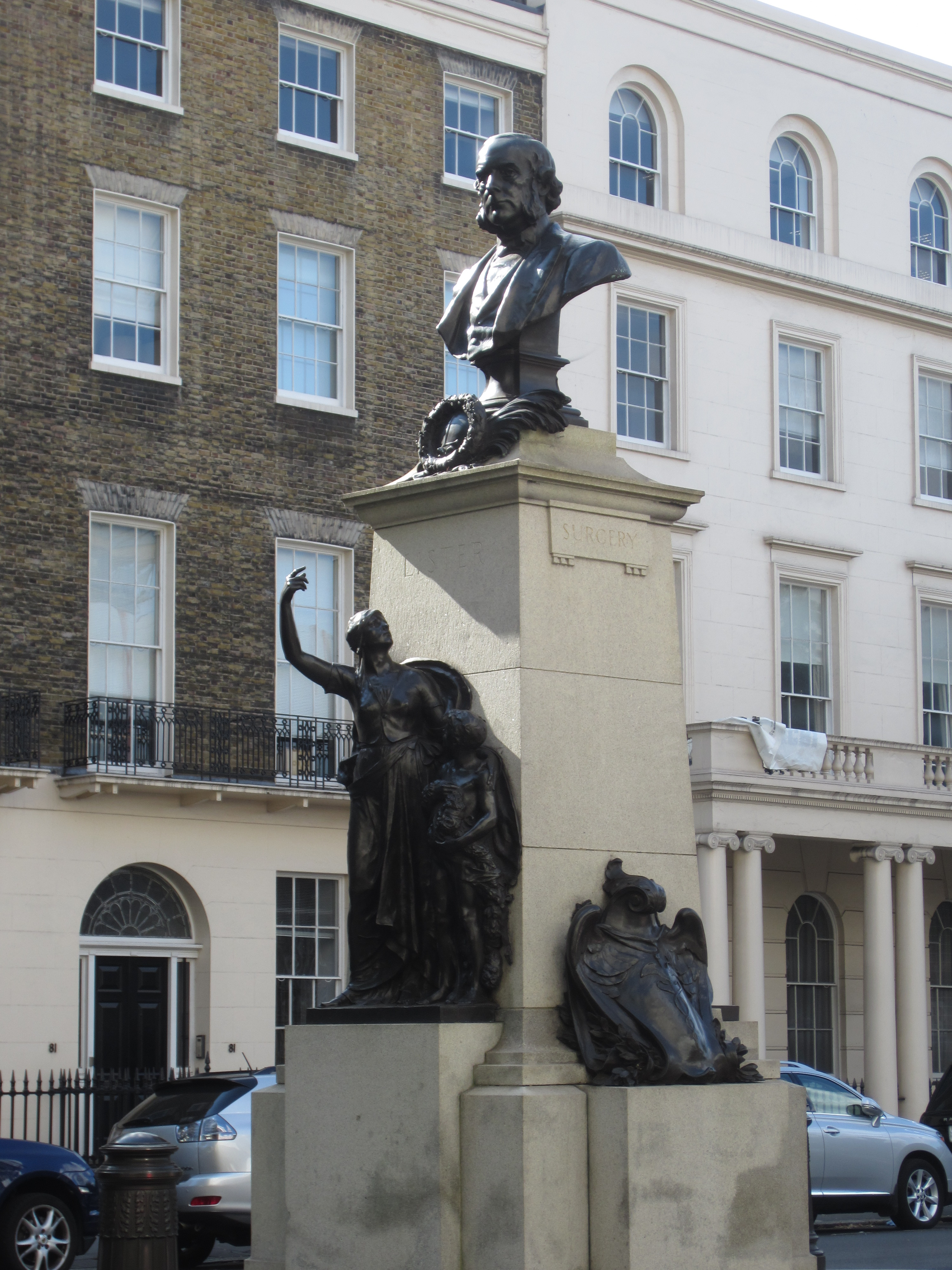
Lord Lister Memorial in Portland Place by Sir Thomas Brock in bronze, 1924

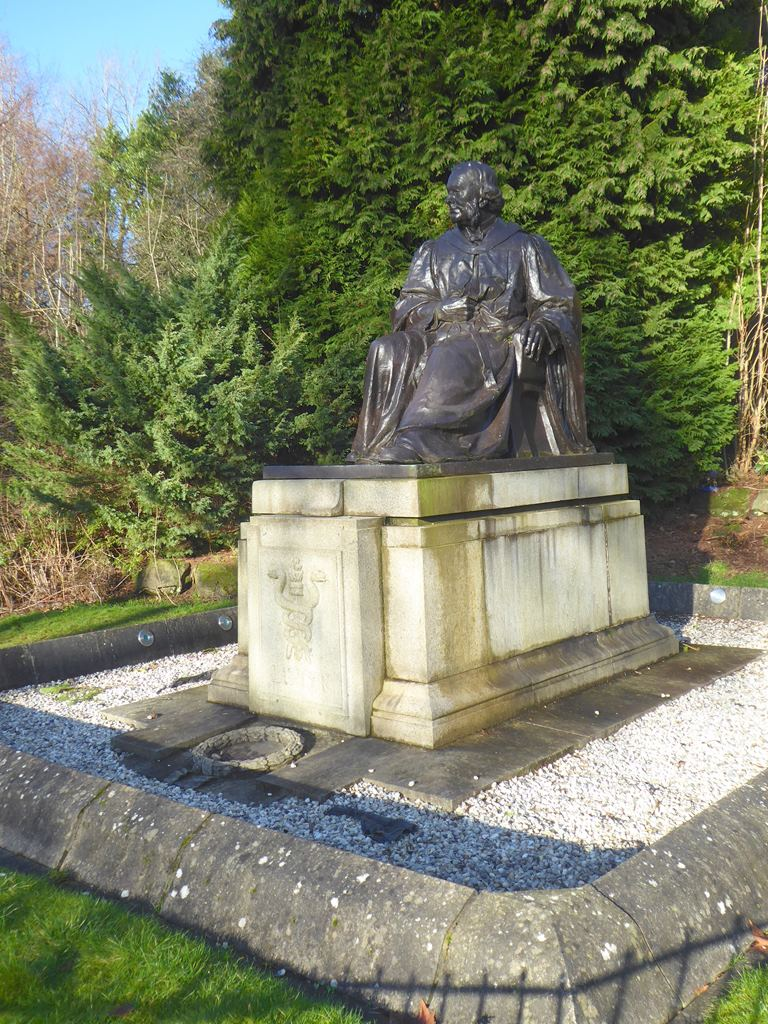
Lord Lister memorial in Kelvingrove Parkby by George Henry Paulin in bronze, 1924

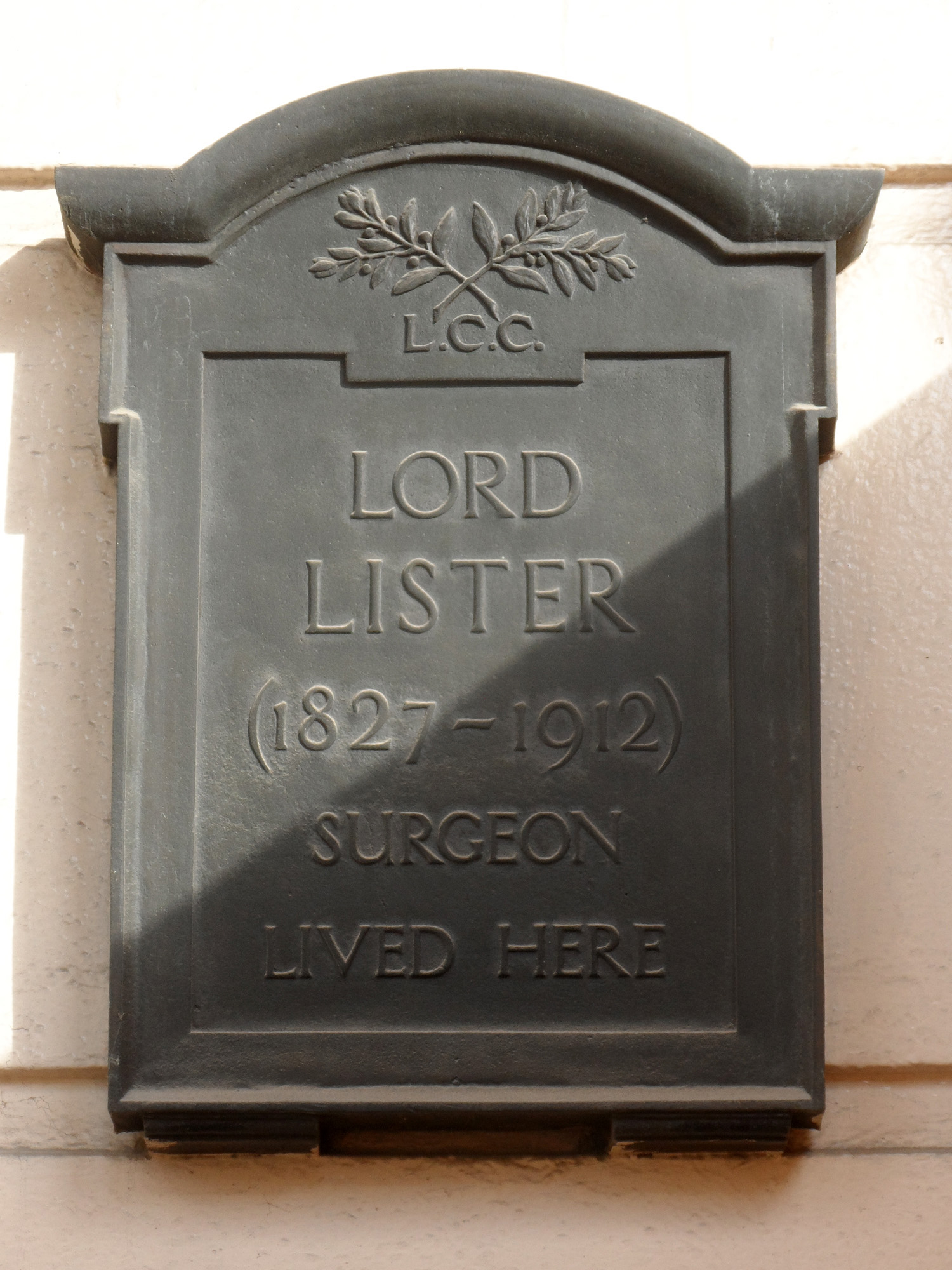
Plaque at 12 Park Crescent, Regent's Park, London

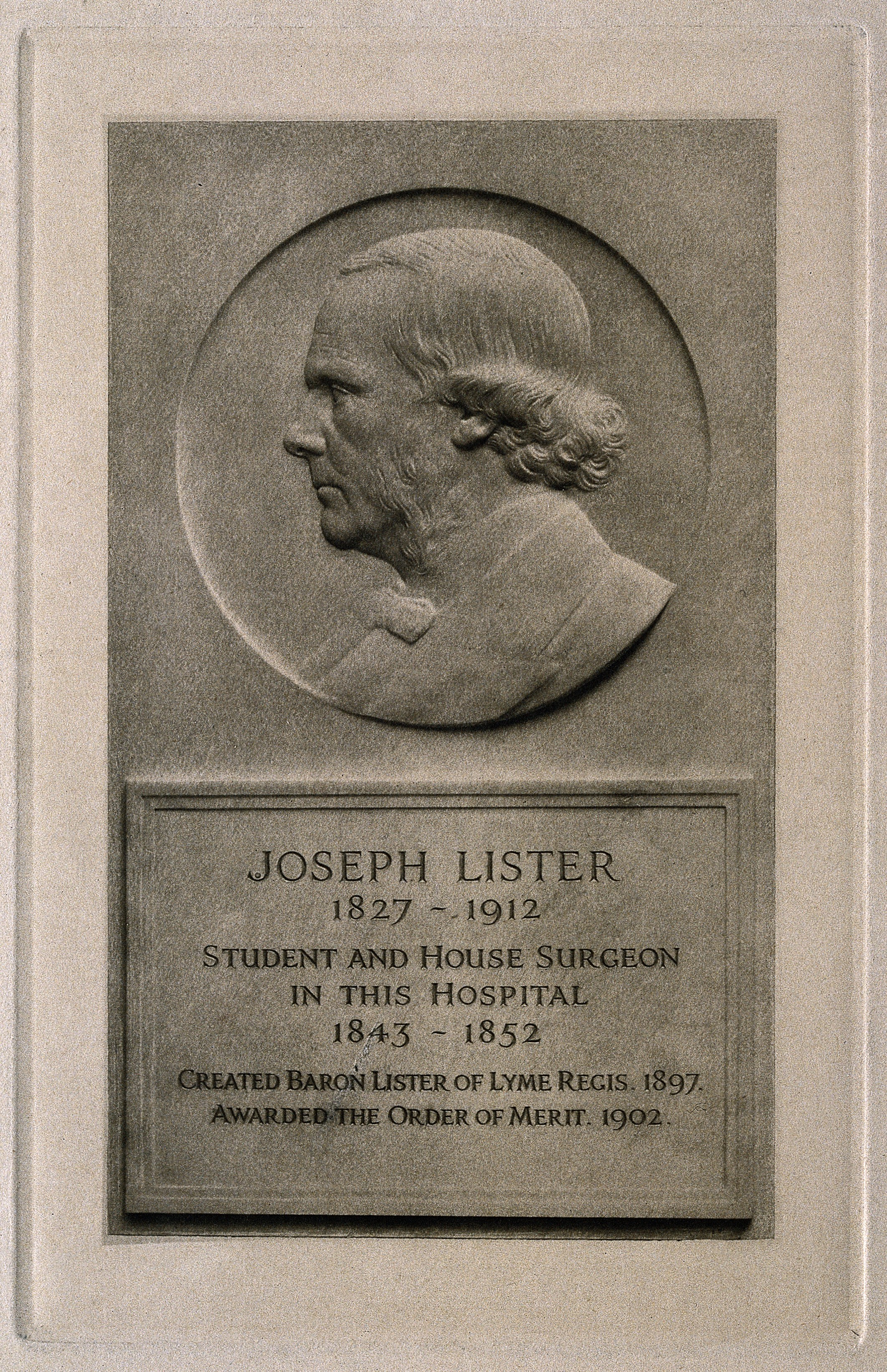
Photogravure plaque, Wellcome Institute, London

The Discovery Expedition of 1901–1904 named the highest point in the Royal Society Range, Antarctica, Mount Lister.

In 1879 Joseph Lawrence, the American inventor of Listerine antiseptic, developed as a surgical antiseptic but nowadays best known as a mouthwash, named it after Lister.

Microorganisms named in his honour include the pathogenic Listeria bacterial genus named by J. H. H. Pirie, typified by the food-borne pathogen Listeria monocytogenes, and Listerella slime mould genus first described by Eduard Adolf Wilhelm Jahn in 1906.

Two postage stamps were issued in September 1965 to honour Lister on the centenary of his antiseptic surgery at the Glasgow Royal Infirmary of Greenlees, the first ever recorded instance of such treatment.

Other things named in Lister's honour

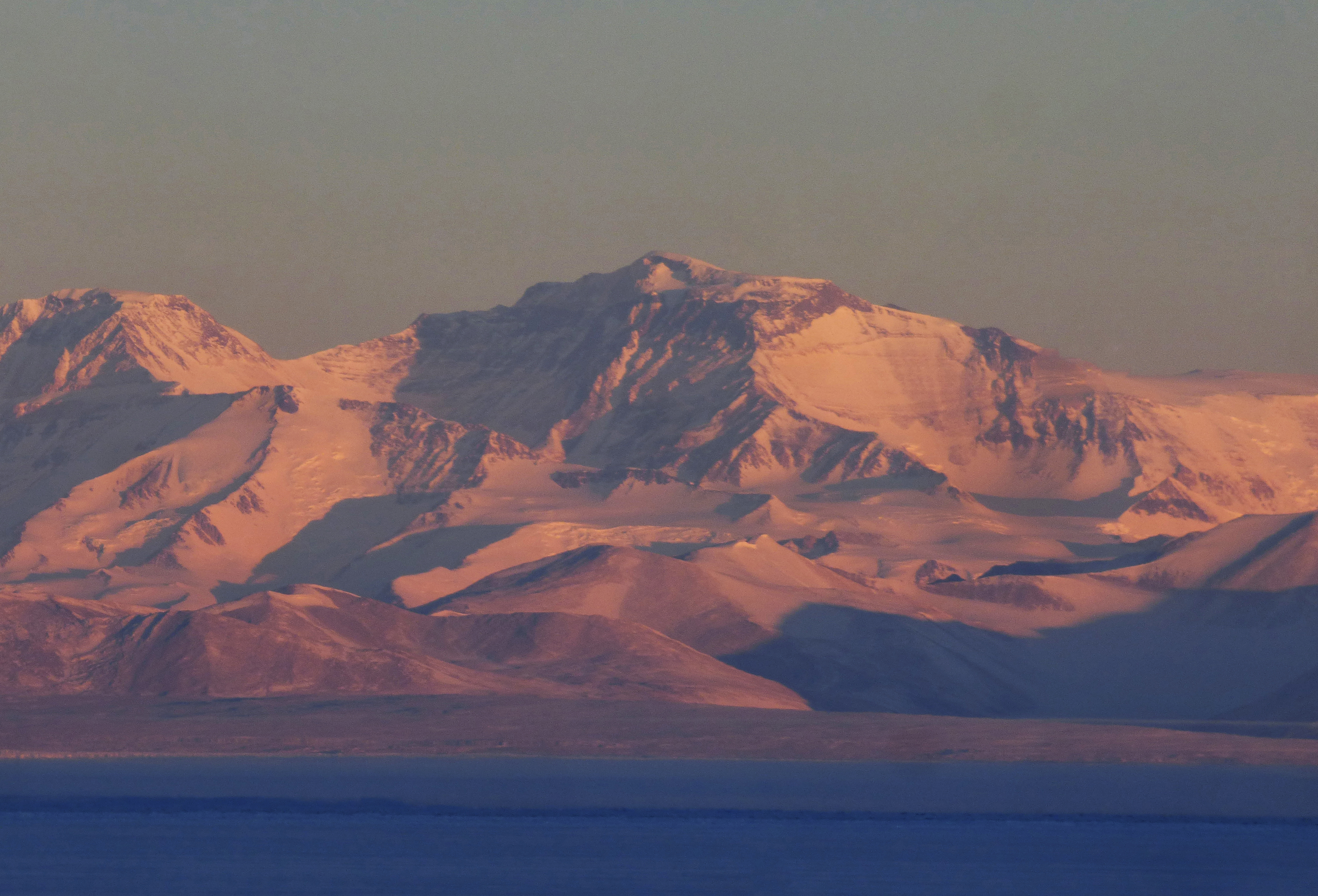
Mount Lister in the Royal Society Range, Antarctica

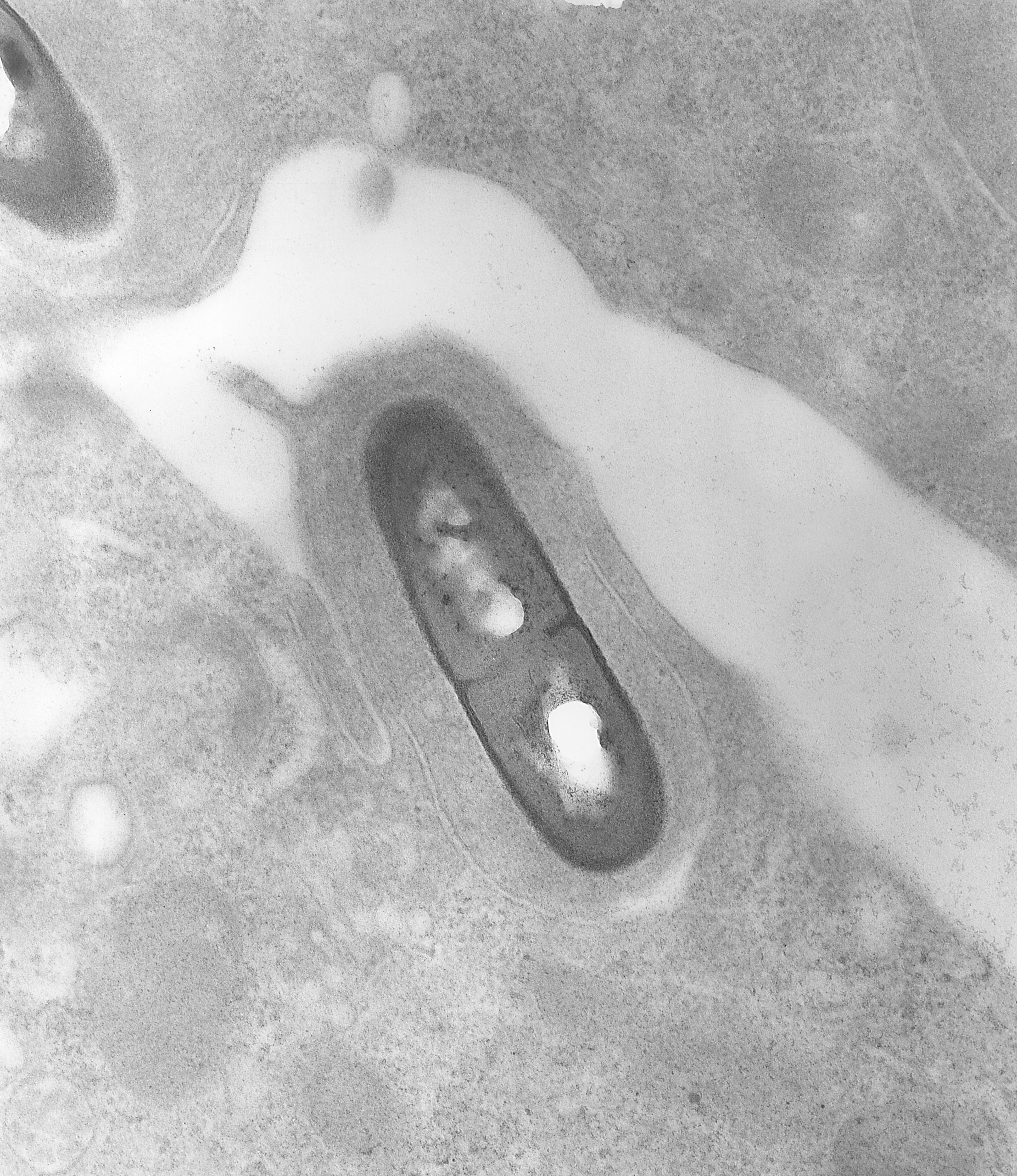
Listeria bacteria, an intracellular parasite in mammals

Lister 1 shilling Centenary Stamp issued on 1 September 1965

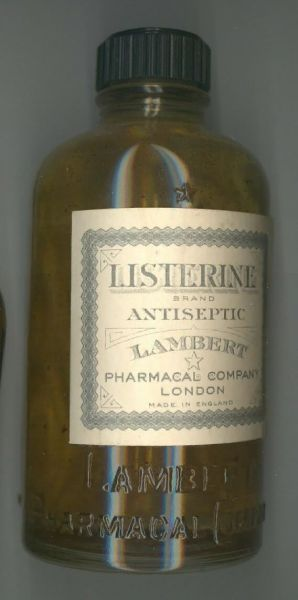
Listerine Antiseptic Bottle

== Reference volumes ==
The following three books are the earliest reference volumes on the antiseptic surgery:

- Ernest SA (1871). The antiseptic system : a treatise on carbolic acid and its compounds : with enquiries into the germ theories of fermentation, putrefaction, and infection; the theory and practice of disinfection; and the practical applications of antiseptics, especially in medicine and surgery. London: Henry Gillman.
- MacCormac W (1880). Antiseptic surgery : an address delivered at St. Thomas's Hospital : with the subsequent debate to which are added a short statement of the theory of the antiseptic method, a description of the materials employed in carrying it out, and some applications of the method to operations and injuries in different regions of the body, and to wounds received in war. London: Smith, Elder and Co. pp. 100–283. OCLC 956538596.
- Cheyne WW (1882). Antiseptic surgery : its principles, practice, history and results. London: Smith, Elder and Co. OCLC 14790004.

== See also ==
- Ignaz Semmelweis, an early pioneer of antiseptic procedures.
- Discoveries of anti-bacterial effects of penicillium moulds before Fleming
- Joseph Sampson Gamgee
- Listerine, a mouthwash named after Lister.
- Hector Charles Cameron
- Watson Cheyne
- Museum of Health Care
- List of presidents of the Royal Society

== Notes ==
Academic offices
Preceded by James A. Lawrie	Regius Professor of Surgery in Glasgow; 1860–1869	Succeeded by George Husband Baird MacLeod
Preceded by James Syme	Regius Professor of Surgery in Edinburgh; 1869–1877	Succeeded by Thomas Annandale
New title	Professor of Clinical Surgery, King's College; 1877–1893	Succeeded by William Watson Cheyne
Professional and academic associations
Preceded by William Thomson	37th President of the Royal Society; 1895–1900	Succeeded by William Huggins
Baronetage of the United Kingdom
Preceded by Farrer baronets	Lister baronets of Park Crescent; 26 December 1883	Succeeded by Bowman baronets
