= The Very Best of Jake Thackray =

The Very Best of Jake Thackray is the name of two compilation albums by Jake Thackray, the first released on LP in 1975, and the second on CD in 2003. They were both released on EMI records and produced by Norman Newell. Although the two albums share the same title, their track lists greatly differ (with only five songs alike), and their covers each depict a different photograph of Thackray, albeit from the same photoshoot.

The 1975 album features songs from all of Thackray’s albums released prior to that year, whereas the 2003 album was released after Thackray’s death and includes songs from 1977’s On Again! On Again!, thereby providing a more complete retrospective of his career.

== 1975 album ==
The Very Best of Jake Thackray

Compilation album by Jake Thackray
- Released: 1975
- Recorded: 1967–1972
- Genre: Folk
- Label: EMI
- Producer: Norman Newell

Jake Thackray chronology
Bantam Cock (1972)	The Very Best of Jake Thackray (1975)	On Again! On Again! (1977)

=== Track listing ===
All tracks are written by Jake Thackray, except where noted

Side 1
No.	Title	Writer(s)	Length
1.	"Lah-Di-Dah" (from The Last Will and Testament of Jake Thackray)
2.	"Country Bus" (from The Last Will and Testament of Jake Thackray)
3.	"Worried Brown Eyes" (from Jake's Progress)
4.	"The Cactus" (from Live Performance)
5.	"Jolly Captain" (from Bantam Cock)
6.	"Caroline Diggeby-Pratte" (from Jake's Progress)
7.	"Brother Gorilla (Le Gorille)" (from Bantam Cock)	Georges Brassens/Thackray
8.	"Sophie" (from Jake's Progress)
9.	"Personal Column" (from The Last Will and Testament of Jake Thackray)
10.	"The Castleford Ladies Magical Circle" (from Jake's Progress)

Side 2
No.	Title	Length
1.	"Jumble Sale" (from The Last Will and Testament of Jake Thackray)
2.	"Family Tree" (from Live Performance)
3.	"Isabel Makes Love Upon National Monuments" (from Bantam Cock)
4.	"Ulysses" (from The Last Will and Testament of Jake Thackray)
5.	"Bantam Cock" (from Bantam Cock)
6.	"Miss World" (from Live Performance)
7.	"The Statues" (from The Last Will and Testament of Jake Thackray)
8.	"Grandad" (from Jake's Progress)
9.	"Leopold Alcox" (from Live Performance)
10.	"The Last Will and Testament of Jake Thackray" (from The Last Will and Testament of Jake Thackray)

== 2003 album ==
The Very Best of Jake Thackray

Compilation album by Jake Thackray
- Released: 14 April 2003
- Recorded: 1967–1977
- Genre: Folk
- Length: 72:04
- Label: EMI
- Producer: Norman Newell

Jake Thackray chronology
Lah-Di-Dah (1991)	The Very Best of Jake Thackray (2003)	Jake in a Box (2006)

Professional ratings
Review scores
Source	Rating
Allmusic	4.5/5 stars

=== Track listing ===
All tracks are written by Jake Thackray, except where noted

No.	Title	Writer(s)	Length
1.	"The Blacksmith and the Toffee-Maker" (from Jake's Progress)	Adapted by Jake Thackray from a story by Laurie Lee
2.	"The Lodger" (from Live Performance)
3.	"Go Little Swale" (from Bantam Cock)
4.	"The Ballad of Billy Kershaw" (from On Again! On Again!)
5.	"La-Di-Dah" (from The Last Will and Testament of Jake Thackray)
6.	"The Hair of the Widow of Bridlington" (from On Again! On Again!)
7.	"It Was Only a Gypsy" (from Bantam Cock)
8.	"Sister Josephine" (from Bantam Cock)
9.	"Leopold Allcocks" (from Live Performance)
10.	"Old Molly Metcalfe" (from Bantam Cock)
11.	"On Again! On Again!" (from On Again! On Again!)
12.	"Rain on the Mountainside" (from On Again! On Again!)
13.	"Bantam Cock" (from Bantam Cock)
14.	"Miss World" (from Live Performance)
15.	"To Do With You" (from On Again! On Again!)
16.	"The Poor Sod" (from On Again! On Again!)
17.	"I Stayed off Work Today" (from On Again! On Again!)
18.	"The Kiss" (from On Again! On Again!)
19.	"The Brigadier" (from On Again! On Again!)
20.	"The Hole" (from Live Performance)
21.	"The Last Will and Testament of Jake Thackray" (from The Last Will and Testament of Jake Thackray)
