= Jake in a Box =

Box set by Jake Thackray
- Released: May 2006
- Genre: Folk
- Label: EMI
- Producer: Norman Newell

Jake Thackray chronology
The Very Best of Jake Thackray (2003)	Jake in a Box (2006)

Professional ratings
Review scores
Source	Rating
AllMusic	link
The Guardian	link

Jake in a Box is a 4-CD box set retrospective of the songs of Jake Thackray, recorded by EMI from 1967 to 1976. It includes his four studio albums, The Last Will and Testament of Jake Thackray (1967), Jake's Progress (1969), Bantam Cock (1972) and On Again! On Again! (1977), and six singles, digitally remastered, plus outtakes from the Last Will and Testament sessions, and songs recorded for an abandoned album in 1970.

== Track listing ==
All tracks are written by Jake Thackray, except where noted

Disc 1
No.	Title	Writer(s)	Length
1.	"Lah-Di-Dah" (From The Last Will and Testament of Jake Thackray, 1967)		3:18
2.	"Country Bus" (From The Last Will and Testament of Jake Thackray, 1967)		3:59
3.	"The Cactus" (From The Last Will and Testament of Jake Thackray, 1967)		3:27
4.	"Scallywag" (From The Last Will and Testament of Jake Thackray, 1967)		4:33
5.	"The Black Swan" (From The Last Will and Testament of Jake Thackray, 1967)		3:06
6.	"Jumble Sale" (From The Last Will and Testament of Jake Thackray, 1967)		3:38
7.	"The Little Black Foal" (From The Last Will and Testament of Jake Thackray, 1967)		3:09
8.	"Personal Column" (From The Last Will and Testament of Jake Thackray, 1967)		4:03
9.	"Ulysses" (From The Last Will and Testament of Jake Thackray, 1967)		4:46
10.	"The Statues" (From The Last Will and Testament of Jake Thackray, 1967)		3:45
11.	"The Last Will And Testament of Jake Thackray" (From The Last Will and Testament of Jake Thackray, 1967)		3:03
12.	"Remember Bethlehem (The Intake School Carol)" (Single, 1967)		3:08
13.	"Joseph" (Single, 1967)		3:32
14.	"La Di Da (Tra La La)" (Single, 1967)	Thackray/Boris Bergman	3:18
15.	"Le Cygne Noir" (Single, 1967)		3:07
16.	"Country Girl" (From Jake's Progress, 1969)		3:34
17.	"Family Tree" (From Jake's Progress, 1969)		3:22
18.	"Sophie" (From Jake's Progress, 1969)		3:00
19.	"Worried Brown Eyes" (From Jake's Progress, 1969)		3:43
20.	"On The Shelf" (From Jake's Progress, 1969)		3:22
21.	"Salvation Army Girl" (From Jake's Progress, 1969)		2:54
22.	"The Blacksmith and the Toffee-Maker" (From Jake's Progress, 1969)	Adapted by Thackray from a story by Laurie Lee	4:29

Disc 2
No.	Title	Length
1.	"The Hole" (From Jake's Progress, 1969)	3:44
2.	"Caroline Diggeby-Pratte" (From Jake's Progress, 1969)	3:07
3.	"Grandad" (From Jake's Progress, 1969)	3:28
4.	"Mrs Murphy" (From Jake's Progress, 1969)	2:54
5.	"One Eyed Isaac" (From Jake's Progress, 1969)	2:30
6.	"The Nurse" (From Jake's Progress, 1969)	2:07
7.	"The Castleford Ladies Magic Circle" (From Jake's Progress, 1969)	2:27
8.	"Leopold Alcocks" (1970, previously unreleased)	3:40
9.	"The Policeman's Jig" (1970, previously unreleased)	2:35
10.	"The Shepherdess" (1970, previously unreleased)	2:40
11.	"Pass Milord The Rooster Juice" (1970, previously unreleased)	2:59
12.	"The Vicar's Missus" (1970, previously unreleased)	2:33
13.	"The Ladies' Basic Freedom Polka" (1970, previously unreleased)	3:15
14.	"My Roly Poly Girl" (1970, previously unreleased)	3:08
15.	"My Pipe My Boots and My Lord" (1970, previously unreleased)	3:56
16.	"The Kirkstall Road Girl" (1970, previously unreleased)	2:45
17.	"Freda" (1970, previously unreleased)	4:58
18.	"The Lodger" (1970, previously unreleased)	3:59
19.	"Bantam Cock" (From Bantam Cock, 1972)	2:51
20.	"Fine Bay Pony" (From Bantam Cock, 1972)	2:48
21.	"The Singer" (From Bantam Cock, 1972)	2:04
22.	"The Girl with the Fragile Eyes" (From Bantam Cock, 1972)	2:55
23.	"Go Little Swale" (From Bantam Cock, 1972)	2:39
24.	"Jolly Captain" (From Bantam Cock, 1972)	3:33
25.	"Isabel Makes Love on National Monuments" (From Bantam Cock, 1972)	3:34

Disc 3
No.	Title	Writer(s)	Length
1.	"Brother Gorilla (Le Gorille)" (From Bantam Cock, 1972)	Georges Brassens/Thackray	2:54
2.	"The Girl in the Window" (From Bantam Cock, 1972)		2:52
3.	"It Was Only A Gypsy" (From Bantam Cock, 1972)		2:31
4.	"Old Molly Metcalfe" (From Bantam Cock, 1972)		3:45
5.	"Sister Josephine" (From Bantam Cock, 1972)		3:23
6.	"Lullaby" (From Bantam Cock, 1972)		1:11
7.	"Country Boy" (Single, 1972)		2:55
8.	"Country Boy (Single)" (1972, previously unreleased)		3:40
9.	"The Prisoner" (Previously unreleased)		3:20
10.	"On Again! On Again!" (From On Again! On Again!, 1977)		4:15
11.	"To Do With You" (From On Again! On Again!, 1977)		4:22
12.	"The Ballad of Billy Kershaw" (From On Again! On Again!, 1977)		4:34
13.	"The Rain on the Mountainside" (From On Again! On Again!, 1977)		2:46
14.	"Isabella (Marinette)" (From On Again! On Again!, 1977)	Brassens/Thackray	1:43
15.	"I Stayed Off Work Today" (From On Again! On Again!, 1977)		4:52
16.	"The Kiss" (From On Again! On Again!, 1977)		3:53
17.	"The Poor Sod" (From On Again! On Again!, 1977)		1:18
18.	"The Hair of the Widow of Bridlington" (From On Again! On Again!, 1977)		3:51
19.	"Over To Isobel (Je Rejoindrai Ma Belle)" (From On Again! On Again!, 1977)	Brassens/Thackray	2:04
20.	"The Brigadier" (From On Again! On Again!, 1977)		3:05
21.	"Joseph" (From On Again! On Again!, 1977)		2:46
22.	"Famous People" (Previously unreleased)		2:07
23.	"The Gravedigger" (Previously unreleased)		3:57
24.	"Family Grave (Demo)" (Previously unreleased)		3:44
25.	"Little Thomas Haverley" (Previously unreleased)		1:39

Disc 4
No.	Title	Writer(s)	Length
1.	"The Little Black Foal" (1967, previously unreleased)		3:06
2.	"Ulysses" (1967, previously unreleased)		3:48
3.	"Scallywag" (1967, previously unreleased)		4:08
4.	"Jumble Sale" (1967, previously unreleased)		2:57
5.	"I've Been Left on the Shelf" (1967, previously unreleased)		3:20
6.	"The Blacksmith and the Toffee Maker" (1967, previously unreleased)	Adapted by Thackray from a story by Laurie Lee	4:13
7.	"The Cactus" (1967, previously unreleased)		3:19
8.	"Lah-Di-Dah" (1967, previously unreleased)		2:52
9.	"Country Bus" (1967, previously unreleased)		3:16
10.	"Family Tree" (1967, previously unreleased)		2:26
11.	"The Statues" (1967, previously unreleased)		3:16
12.	"The Last Will And Testament of Jake Thackray" (1967, previously unreleased)		2:34
13.	"Greasy Joan (One eyed Isaac)" (1967, previously unreleased)		2:20
14.	"Dog" (1967, previously unreleased)		2:13
15.	"Grandad" (1967, previously unreleased)		3:04
16.	"Isabella" (1967, previously unreleased)	Brassens/Thackray	1:33
17.	"Salvation Army Girl" (1967, previously unreleased)		2:39
18.	"Isobel" (1967, previously unreleased)		2:19
19.	"Slowly Our Eyes" (1967, previously unreleased)		2:37
20.	"Sophie" (1967, previously unreleased)		2:59
21.	"The KG Girl (The Kirkstall Road Girl)" (1967, previously unreleased)		2:20
22.	"The Nurse" (1967, previously unreleased)		1:37
23.	"The Shepherdess" (1967, previously unreleased)		2:26
24.	"Remember Bethlehem" (1967, previously unreleased)		3:23
25.	"Joseph (including bonus track "Le Cygne Noir")" (1967, previously unreleased)		9:33
