= Lah-Di-Dah =

Compilation album by Jake Thackray
- Released: 1991
- Genre: Folk
- Label: EMI
- Producer: Norman Newell

Jake Thackray chronology
Jake Thackray and Songs (1981)	Lah-Di-Dah (1991)	The Very Best of Jake Thackray (2003)

Professional ratings
Review scores
Source	Rating
Allmusic	4/5 stars

Lah-Di-Dah is a compilation album by Jake Thackray, released by EMI on LP and CD (with bonus tracks) in 1991.

== Track listing ==
All songs written by Jake Thackray, except where noted.

Side one

1. "Lah-Di-Dah"
2. "On Again! On Again!"
3. "Country Bus"
4. "Worried Brown Eyes"
5. "The Cactus"
6. "Jolly Captain"
7. "Caroline Diggeby-Pratte"
8. "Brother Gorilla" (Le Gorille) (Georges Brassens/Jake Thackray)
9. "Sophie"

Side two

1. "Personal Column"
2. "Jumble Sale"
3. "Family Tree"
4. "Isobel Makes Love Upon National Monuments"
5. "Bantam Cock"
6. "The Statues"
7. "Sister Josephine"
8. "Isobel"
9. "The Last Will and Testament of Jake Thackray"

Bonus tracks (CD)

1. "The Kiss"
2. "The Castleford Ladies Magic Circle"
3. "Ulysses"
4. "Grand-Daddy"
