= Bantam Cock =

Studio album by Jake Thackray
- Released: 1972
- Genre: Folk; jazz
- Length: 37:00
- Label: EMI
- Producer: Norman Newell

Jake Thackray chronology
Live Performance (1971)	Bantam Cock (1972)	The Very Best of Jake Thackray (1975)

Professional ratings
Review scores
Source	Rating
Allmusic	4/5 stars
Record Mirror	(positive)
Reading Evening Post	(positive)

Bantam Cock is the third studio album by Jake Thackray. It was produced by Norman Newell and released on LP by EMI in 1972. Musical direction was by Geoff Love. The album is currently out of print, but its songs, digitally remastered, are included in the 4-CD retrospective Jake in a Box.

== Content ==
Bantam Cock features Thackray’s voice and acoustic guitar accompanied by double bass and electric guitar. The album is notable among Thackray’s catalogue for its jazz influence and inclusion of electric guitar solos; Thackray’s output had thus far been entirely acoustic. "Brother Gorilla" is Thackray's English-language adaptation of the French song "Le Gorille" by Georges Brassens.

== Reception ==
Upon release, the album was met with critical acclaim from music press. Record Mirror said "quite simply, and not to put too fine a point on it, Jake Thackray is a genius...there are some tremendous songs on this", while the Reading Evening Post agreed, saying "yet another brilliant record from the Yorkshire tyke". Retrospectively, Allmusic awarded the album four stars, citing the title track and "Sister Josephine" as "drop dead classics" and calling "Old Molly Metcalfe" the "most magical" of the album's highlights.

== Legacy ==
The song "Bantam Cock" has been covered by Fred Wedlock, The Corries, Alex Beaton and Jasper Carrott. "Sister Josephine" has been covered by The Clancy Brothers, The Barron Knights, Colcannon and Robbie O'Connell. "Old Molly Metcalfe" has been covered by Tony Capstick and The Witches of Elswick.

== Track listing ==
All tracks are written by Jake Thackray, except where noted.

Side 1
No.	Title	Length
1.	"Bantam Cock"	2:51
2.	"Fine Bay Pony"	2:48
3.	"The Singer"	2:04
4.	"The Girl with the Fragile Eyes"	2:55
5.	"Go Little Swale"	2:39
6.	"Jolly Captain"	3:33
7.	"Isabel Makes Love Upon National Monuments"	3:34

Side 2
No.	Title	Writer(s)	Length
1.	"Brother Gorilla (Le Gorille)"	Georges Brassens/Thackray	2:54
2.	"The Girl in the Window"		2:52
3.	"It Was Only a Gypsy"		2:31
4.	"Old Molly Metcalfe"		3:45
5.	"Sister Josephine"		3:23
6.	"Lullaby"		1:11
