= Jake Thackray and Songs =

Live album by Jake Thackray
- Released: 1981
- Recorded: 1981
- Venue: The Stables, Milton Keynes, UK
- Genre: Folk
- Length: 51:13
- Label: Dingle’s, BBC

Jake Thackray chronology
On Again! On Again! (1977)	Jake Thackray and Songs (1981)	Lah-Di-Dah (1991)

Jake Thackray and Songs was a six-part television series recorded in 1980 and broadcast on BBC2 in 1981, in which Jake Thackray and guests performed songs live in a variety of venues. A live album of the same name, recorded at the Stables Theatre, Wavendon, Milton Keynes, as part of the sessions for the TV series, was released on LP by Dingle’s Records in 1981. All six episodes of the TV series still exist in the BBC archives with Thackray's performances and some of those of his guests released as a DVD in October 2014. The album remained out of print and circulation for some time, until it was released on Spotify in 2022.

The programme and subsequent album featured three new songs: "The Remembrance", "One of Them”, a sombre ballad that condemns racism and bigotry, and "The Bull", a comedic critique of those in power.

== TV series ==
- Programme 1 was broadcast on 6 January 1981. It featured Richard and Linda Thompson as guests, and Thackray performed "Family Tree", "The Hair of the Widow of Bridlington", "The Brigadier" and "On Again! On Again!".
- Programme 2's guest was Ralph McTell, and Thackray performed "Country Bus", "Sister Josephine", "To Do With You", "The Blacksmith and the Toffee Maker", "The Last Will and Testament of Jake Thackray", "The Poor Sod".
- Programme 3 was recorded at The Hare and Hounds in Birmingham, and broadcast on 20 January 1981. Guests were the Maddy Prior band, and Thackray performed "Lah-Di-Dah", "The Remembrance", "Personal Column", "Fine Bay Pony", "Ulysses" and "Old Molly Metcalfe".
- Programme 4 was broadcast on 27 January 1981. The guest performer was Alex Glasgow, and Thackray played "The Statues", "The Jolly Captain", "The Castleford Ladies Magical Circle" and "One of Them".
- Programme 5's guest was Susha, and Thackray performed "The Little Black Foal", "It Was Only a Gypsy", "The Ballad of Billy Kershaw", "Bantam Cock" and "Joseph".
- Programme 6 guest starred Pete Scott, and Thackray performed "The Lodger", "Scallywag", "The Bull" and "Leopold Alcocks".

== LP ==
=== Track listing ===
All tracks are written by Jake Thackray, except where noted.

Side 1
No.	Title	Writer(s)	Length
1.	"One of Them"
2.	"Brother Gorilla (Le Gorille)"	Georges Brassens/Thackray
3.	"The Little Black Foal"
4.	"The Blacksmith and the Toffee Maker"	Adapted by Thackray from a story by Laurie Lee
5.	"Country Bus"
6.	"The Bull"

Side 2
No.	Title	Length
1.	"Sister Josephine"
2.	"To Do With You"
3.	"The Last Will and Testament of Jake Thackray"
4.	"The Poor Sod"
5.	"On Again! On Again!"
6.	"The Remembrance"

=== Personnel ===
- Jake Thackray – vocals and guitar
- Alan Williams – string bass
- John Etheridge – guitar

== DVD ==
In November 2013 it was announced that agreement had been secured from the BBC, Thackray's estate and other artists for a DVD to be professionally produced from the BBC's original recordings. The DVD went on sale in October 2014. Thackray's anecdotes, introductions and songs from each episode are presented in their original order however the episodes are presented in the order of 6, 4, 5, 3, 1 and 2.

=== Track listing ===
All tracks are written by Jake Thackray, except where noted.

No.	Title	Writer(s)	Length
1.	"The Lodger"
2.	"Scallywag"
3.	"The Bull"
4.	"Leopold Alcocks"
5.	"The Statues"
6.	"Worried Brown Eyes"
7.	"The Jolly Captain"
8.	"The Castleford Ladies Magical Circle"
9.	"One of Them"
10.	"Little Black Foal"
11.	"It Was Only a Gypsy"
12.	"The Ballad of Billy Kershaw"
13.	"Bantam Cock"
14.	"Joseph"
15.	"Lah Di Dah"
16.	"The Remembrance"
17.	"Personal Column"
18.	"Fine Bay Pony"
19.	"Ulysses"
20.	"Old Molly Metcalfe"
21.	"Family Tree"
22.	"The Hair of the Widow of Bridlington"
23.	"The Brigadier"
24.	"On Again! On Again!"
25.	"Country Bus"
26.	"Sister Josephine"
27.	"To Do With You"
28.	"The Blacksmith and the Toffeemaker"	Adapted by Thackray from a story by Laurie Lee
29.	"The Last Will and Testament of Jake Thackray"
30.	"The Poor Sod"

A Guest section of the DVD presents songs from other artists who appeared in the series.

- Pete Scott: "Wallpaper" and "Miss Lapotaire"
- Alex Glasgow: "Maggie Gee", "My Love and I", "Close the Coalhouse Door" and "The Song of Margaret Thatcher"
- Ralph McTell: "Song for Martin" and "Water of Dreams"
