= On Again! On Again! =

Studio album by Jake Thackray
- Released: 1977
- Genre: Folk
- Label: EMI
- Producer: Norman Newell

Jake Thackray chronology
| The Very Best of Jake Thackray (1975) | On Again! On Again! (1977) | Jake Thackray and Songs (1981) |

Professional ratings
Review scores
| Source | Rating |
|---|---|
| Allmusic | link |

On Again! On Again! is the fourth studio album by Jake Thackray. It was produced by Norman Newell and released on LP by EMI in 1977. The album is currently out of print, but its songs, digitally remastered, are included in the four-CD retrospective Jake in a Box.

It includes two English-language adaptations of songs by the French singer Georges Brassens: "Isabella" (adapted from Brassens' "Marinette"), and "Over to Isobel" (adapted from Brassens' "Je Rejoindrai Ma Belle").

== Track listing ==
All tracks are written by Jake Thackray, except where noted

Side 1
| No. | Title | Writer(s) | Length |
|---|---|---|---|
| 1. | "On Again! On Again!" | | 4.15 |
| 2. | "To Do With You" | | 4.22 |
| 3. | "The Ballad Of Billy Kershaw" | | 4.34 |
| 4. | "The Rain On The Mountainside" | | 2.46 |
| 5. | "Isabella (Marinette)" | Georges Brassens/Thackray | 1:43 |
| 6. | "I Stayed Off Work Today" | | 4:52 |

Side 2
| No. | Title | Writer(s) | Length |
|---|---|---|---|
| 1. | "The Kiss" | | 3:53 |
| 2. | "The Poor Sod" | | 1:18 |
| 3. | "The Hair of the Widow of Bridlington" | | 3:51 |
| 4. | "Over To Isobel (Je Rejoindrai Ma Belle)" | Brassens/Thackray | 2:04 |
| 5. | "The Brigadier" | | 3:05 |
| 6. | "Joseph" | | 2:46 |

== Personnel ==
- Jake Thackray - vocals, guitar
- Dick Abell - guitar
- Alan Williams - bass
