= Ham House, Newham =

Coordinates: 51.5417°N 0.0148°E

Ham House was a building in what is now the Upton Cross area of Newham, east London. It was first recorded in 1670 as Rooke Hall or Rookes Hall, a mid-16th-century building, which was later renamed Upton House. Admiral John Elliot sold it in 1762 to John Fothergill, a Quaker doctor and botanist. In the late 1780s it was renamed Ham House to avoid confusion with another Upton House on what is now the corner of Lancaster Road and Upton Lane. Ham House was bought by Samuel Gurney in 1812. It was demolished in 1872 and its grounds opened to the public as West Ham Park in 1874.
