= Live Performance =

Live album by Jake Thackray
- Released: 1971 (LP); 1976 (LP, reissue); 2006 (CD)
- Recorded: Queen Elizabeth Hall, 1 November 1970
- Genre: Folk
- Length: 96:23 (CD version)
- Label: EMI
- Producer: Norman Newell

Jake Thackray chronology
Jake's Progress (1969)	Live Performance (1971)	Bantam Cock (1972)

Professional ratings
Review scores
Source	Rating
Allmusic	4/5 stars

Live Performance is a live album by Jake Thackray. Recorded at the Queen Elizabeth Hall in London in 1970, it was released on LP by EMI in 1971 and reissued in 1976. An expanded version was released on CD in 2006.

Thackray was uncomfortable performing in large venues, and his socialist left-wing politics meant he could not understand why people would pay money to see him perform. He almost backed out of this concert, feeling he had no right to entertain such a large crowd, but producer Norman Newell managed to persuade him to go on. This wasn’t the last time this would happen; before a concert in 1977, Thackray’s agent Alex Armitage allegedly intercepted Thackray already in his car leaving the venue.

== LP track listing ==
All tracks are written by Jake Thackray

Side 1
No.	Title	Length
1.	"Family Tree"
2.	"The Hole"
3.	"Isobel"
4.	"Miss World"
5.	"Pass Milord the Rooster Juice"
6.	"Remember Bethlehem"
7.	"Ladies' Basic Freedoms Polka"

Side 2
No.	Title	Length
1.	"The Cactus"
2.	"Lah-Di-Dah"
3.	"Leopold Alcox"
4.	"The Lodger"
5.	"The Last Will and Testament of Jake Thackray"
6.	"Grandad"
7.	"Romance"

== CD track listing ==
All tracks are written by Jake Thackray, except where noted

Disc 1
No.	Title	Writer(s)	Length
1.	"Family Tree"		3:45
2.	"The Little Black Foal" (previously unreleased)		3:52
3.	"Worried Brown Eyes" (previously unreleased)		3:54
4.	"The Hole"		4:04
5.	"Salvation Army Girl" (previously unreleased)		2:58
6.	"Isobel"		2:40
7.	"Isabella (Marinette)" (previously unreleased)	Georges Brassens/Thackray	2:45
8.	"One Eyed Isaac" (previously unreleased)		2:27
9.	"Miss World"		3:27
10.	"Caroline Diggeby-Pratte" (previously unreleased)		3:26
11.	"Pass Milord The Rooster Juice"		3:17
12.	"Remember Bethlehem"		3:08
13.	"Ladies' Basic Freedoms Polka"		2:30
14.	"Mrs Murphy" (previously unreleased)		3:00
15.	"The Nurse" (previously unreleased)		1:54

Disc 2
No.	Title	Writer(s)	Length
1.	"The Cactus"		3:35
2.	"Lah-Di-Dah"		3:18
3.	"Personal Column" (previously unreleased)		3:48
4.	"The Black Swan" (previously unreleased)		2:43
5.	"Leopold Alcocks"		4:08
6.	"Ulysses" (previously unreleased)		3:57
7.	"Country Bus" (previously unreleased)		4:07
8.	"The Castleford Ladies' Magic Circle" (previously unreleased)		2:24
9.	"The Blacksmith and the Toffee-Maker" (previously unreleased)	Adapted by Thackray from a story by Laurie Lee	4:44
10.	"The Lodger"		3:49
11.	"Sophie" (previously unreleased)		2:59
12.	"The Last Will And Testament of Jake Thackray"		3:38
13.	"Grandad"		4:16
14.	"Romance"		1:45
