= St Gabriel's Church, Canning Town =

Former church in Canning Town, London

Coordinates: 51.518694°N 0.003877°E

St Gabriel's Church, Canning Town was a Church of England church in Canning Town, east London. It originated as an undedicated iron church between the River Lea and the railway to the north of the Barking Road, on the site later used for the brick-built permanent church of St Gabriel's, consecrated in 1876. Initially a mission of All Saints Church, West Ham, it was given a parish of its own three years after the consecration, using parts of those of All Saints, St Mary's and St Andrew's. It was damaged in the London Blitz and demolished around 1955, with its parish split between St Matthias and St Luke's in 1961.
