= Plaistow, Newham =

Town in East London, England

Coordinates: 51.5243°N 0.0245°E

Plaistow
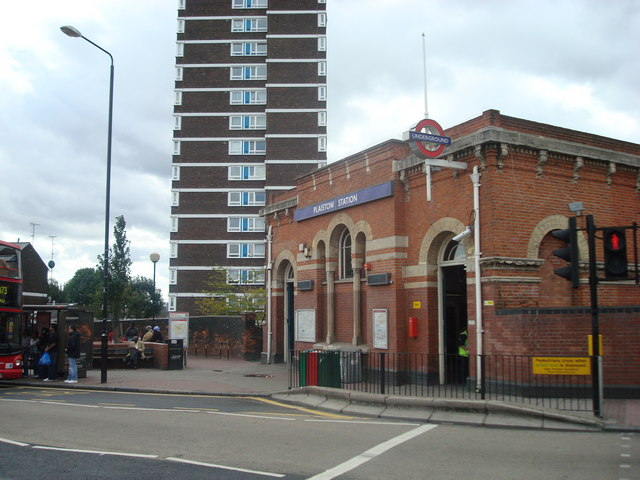
- Plaistow underground station

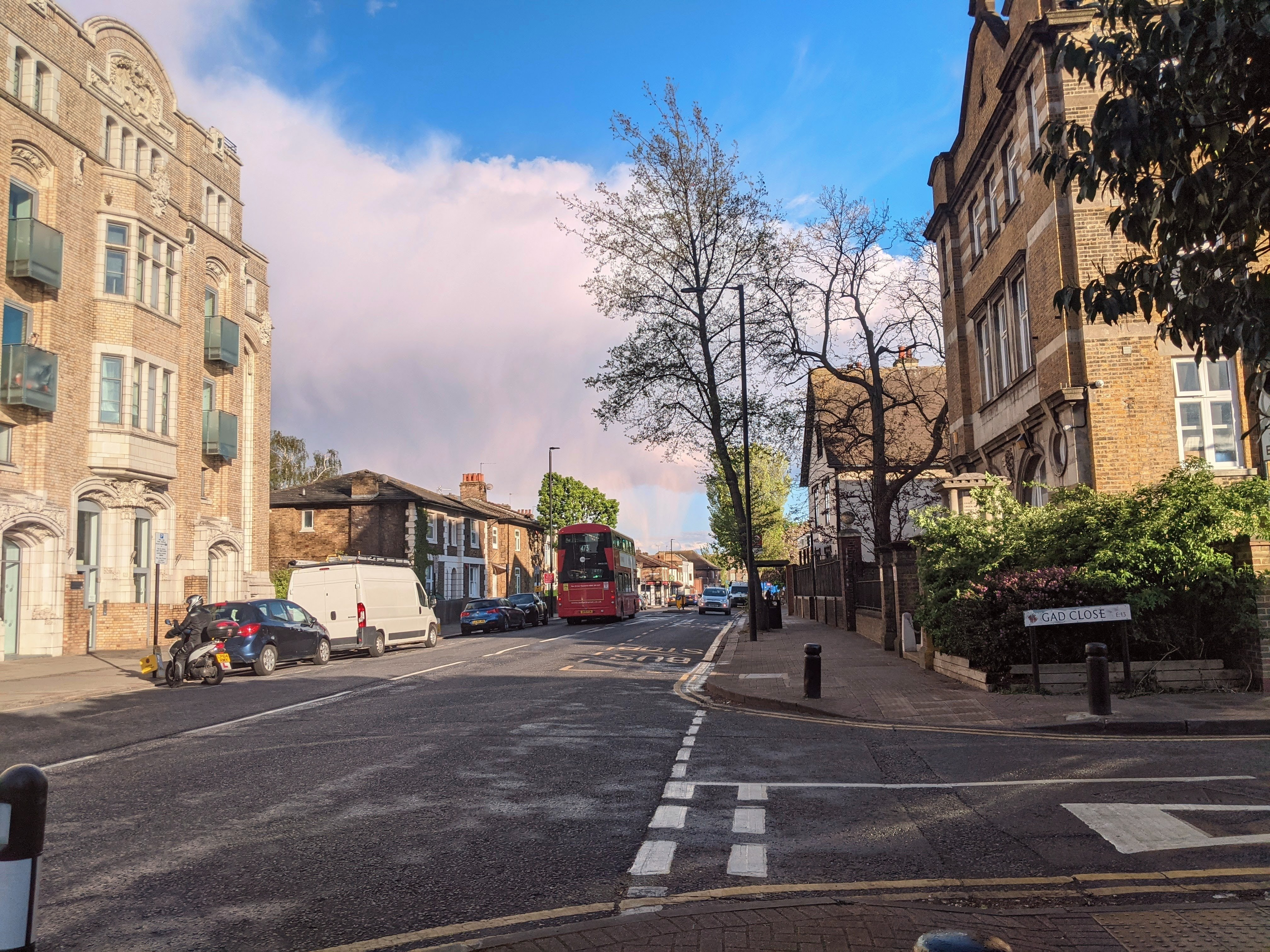
- Greengate Street, Plaistow

- Location within Greater London
- Population: 31,874 (2011 Census. Plaistow North and South Wards)
- OS grid reference: TQ405825
- London borough: Newham
- Ceremonial county: Greater London
- Region: London
- Country: England
- Sovereign state: United Kingdom
- Post town: LONDON
- Postcode district: E13
- Dialling code: 020
- Police: Metropolitan
- Fire: London
- Ambulance: London
- UK Parliament: West Ham and Beckton
- London Assembly: City and East

Plaistow (/ˈplɑːstoʊ/ PLAHST-oh or /ˈplæstoʊ/ PLAST-oh) is a suburban area of east London, England, within the London Borough of Newham. It adjoins Upton Park to the north, East Ham to the east, Beckton to the south, Canning Town to the south-west and West Ham to the west. Plaistow also borders Stratford, home to Westfield shopping centre and the new West Ham Stadium.

It was originally a ward in the parish of West Ham, hundred of Becontree, and part of the historic county of Essex. In 1965, new boundaries designated in the London Government Act 1963 came into effect and, since then, Plaistow has been part of the London Borough of Newham, a local government district of Greater London. The area forms the majority of the London E13 postcode district. Plaistow North, Plaistow South, and Plaistow West & Canning Town East are three of the ten electoral wards making up the UK parliamentary constituency of West Ham and Beckton.

The main roads are the A112; Prince Regent Lane, Greengate Street, The Broadway, High Street and Plaistow Road, which is a former Roman road; and the A124 (Barking Road), which passes south west/ north east through Plaistow and past the former West Ham United football ground. Commercial and retail premises are on the A112 at Greengate Street leading north and Prince Regent Lane south, leading 0.3 miles (0.5 km) to Newham Sixth Form College and along the A124.

== Toponymy ==
The name Plaistow is believed by some to come from Sir Hugh de Plaiz or Plaitz who, in 1065, married Philippa de Montfitchet, of the Mountfitchet Castle family; she owned the district and is reputed to have named it the Manor of Plaiz.

However, in his book What's in a Name?, first published in 1977, author Cyril M. Harris states that c. 1200 Plaistow was recorded as Plagestoue, derived from the Old English pleg, meaning 'sport' or 'playing', and stowe 'place'. It was a place where miracle plays were performed so it was a 'playing place'. While the book concentrates on the names of London railway stations, Harris could have confused Plaistow in Essex (and later London) with the Plaistow, near Crich in Derbyshire, which is recorded as Plagestoue in the Darley Charters of 1200. Nevertheless, the derivation from pleg + stowe could apply equally to all places named Plaistow, Plaister, etc.

Plaistow in Essex is reported as appearing as Playstowe in the county's Patent Rolls of 1414. This is also quoted by James Kemble, another who cites the derivation from pleg + stowe – a 'place for playing'.

The book Fifty Years a Borough, 1886-1936, The Story of West Ham, compiled by Donald McDougall on behalf of West Ham County Borough Council, leans towards the derivation from Hugh de Plaiz, as Lord of the Manor, and that Plaistow was the Stow or village of the de Plaiz family.

== History ==
=== Medieval and Tudor ===
Hugh de Balun was a property-owner in the area in the 12th century and belonged to the same family as Hamelin de Balun. Known as Balostret in the 1371 Calendar of Inquisitions Miscellaneous, Balaam /ˈbeɪləm/ Street is one of the oldest roads in Plaistow and is probably named after de Balun, though some argue its namesake is in fact a Walter Balame.

In 1353, Sir Richard de Playz gave the manor of Plaistow to the abbot of Stratford-Langthorne. When this abbey was dissolved the manor was appropriated by the Crown, and granted to Sir Roger Cholmeley in 1553.

=== 18th century ===
Daniel Defoe's 1724 work Tour of the Eastern Counties (Note: It is part of his A Tour Thro' the Whole Island of Great Britain.) mentions Plaistow as a town in which there had been much new building as well as repairs to existing houses since the Glorious Revolution. Plaistow is connected with the legend of notorious highwayman Dick Turpin. (Note: Born 1705; executed 1739.) Several stories state that among Turpin's first crimes was the theft of two oxen from his employer, a Mr Giles of Plaistow, in 1730. Turpin is also alleged to have run a smuggling gang that operated between Plaistow and Southend-on-Sea.

Plaistow ward of West Ham civil parish in 1867

In Aaron Hill's time there (1738–1750), Plaistow was a rural village described as a day's coach journey from Westminster, despite it being a distance of only some 8 miles (13 km). The Black Lion public house in the High Street is one of the oldest landmarks in Plaistow and is reputed to date back to at least 1742.

=== 19th century ===
Newly-appointed as pastor to a Congregationalist church in Plaistow, John Curwen opened the Plaistow Public School in 1844. That year also saw Plaistow become a chapelry as well as an Anglican parish in its own right, split off from All Saints Church, West Ham; Plaistow's chapel of ease St Mary's became the new parish's church. Curwen also started a printing business in Plaistow in 1863.

In the 1870s, John Marius Wilson described it in his Imperial Gazetteer of England and Wales as a village, a chapelry and a ward in the Parish of West Ham in Essex. The population of the chapelry was recorded as 11,214 in 1861. James Thorne, in his 1876 work Handbook to the Environs of London, mentions Plaistow, Essex, as a village and ecclesiastical district of West Ham parish with a population of 6,699. Thorne recounts the changes to the old village of Plaistow, with the gentry, merchants and others of renown having gone and the occupations of the residents changed from agricultural and pastoral to manufacturing. In 1886 Plaistow became part of the new County Borough of West Ham.

The area gained several new Anglican churches in the second half of the 19th century – St Philip's in 1860, St Andrew's in 1868, St Katherine's in 1891, St Martin's in 1894 and St Thomas's in 1898. Only St Martin's and St Andrew's survive; St Andrew's is mentioned in Thorne's work and, like its adjoining vicarage (1871), is a grade II listed building. John Curwen's son, John Spencer Curwen, (Note: Curwen founded the Stratford & East London Music Festival, the oldest in England, in 1882.) published a paper called Old Plaistow in 1891 describing houses of the area.

=== 1900–1995 ===
It was not until 1905 that Plaistow was connected to the telephone network, though it became its own UK Parliamentary constituency in 1918, consisting of the Plaistow and Hudsons wards of the County Borough of West Ham, plus part of the Canning Town ward. That constituency was subsumed into the West Ham's in 1950.

The Memorial Baptist Church was built in 1921 as a monument to the dead of the First World War. Opened in 1922, it is now a grade II listed building. Its ten Memorial Bells bear the names of more than 150 men who died in the fighting (Note: The largest number of names on any set of bells in the world.) The bells were cleaned and restored using a National Heritage Lottery grant between February and August 2011 as part of a larger restoration project.

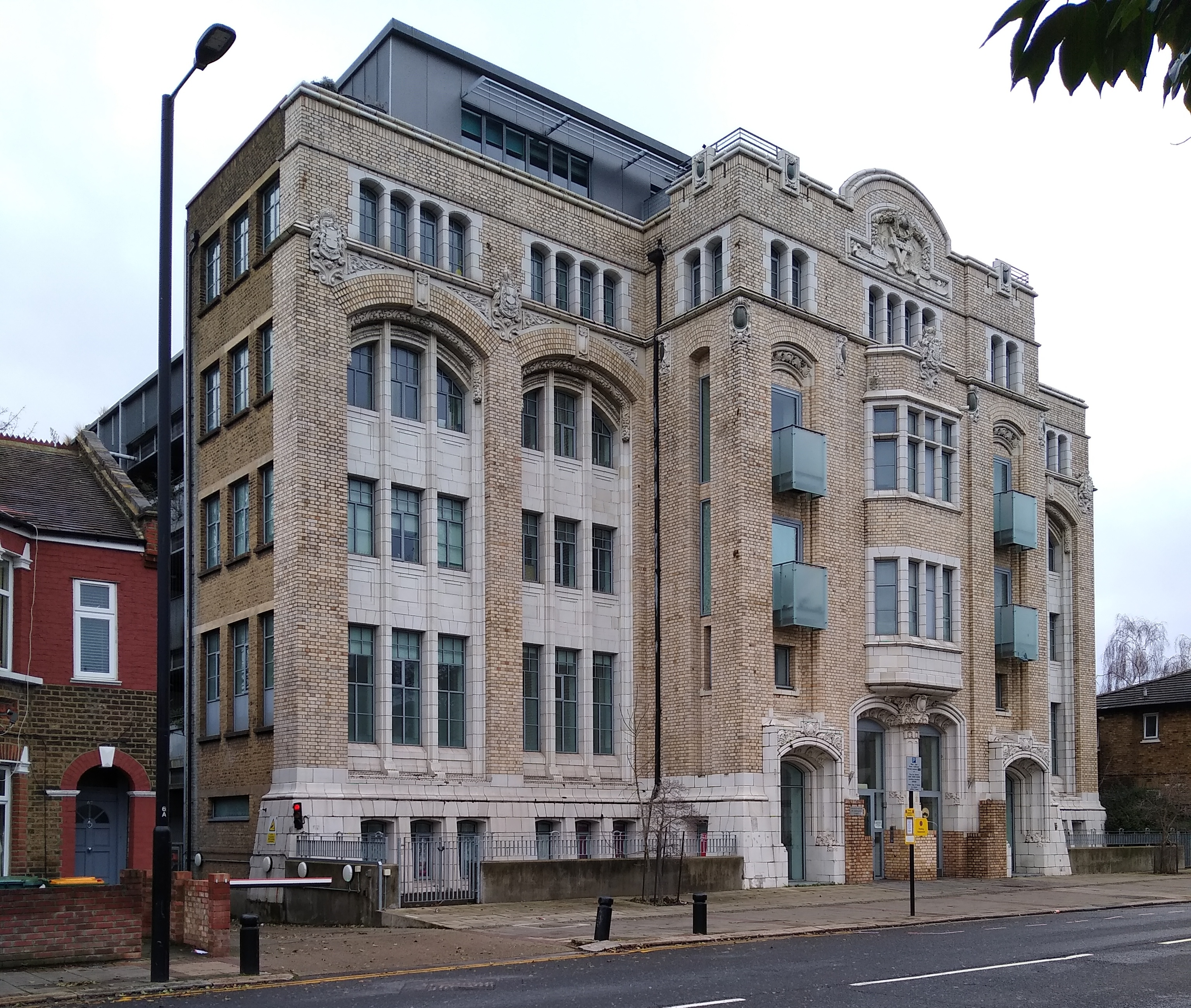
Greengate House photographed in 2021

In 1921, the YMCA opened Greengate House on Greengate Street. Now a grade II listed building, it was once used as an Art college by the University of East London and students included Jake and Dinos Chapman. In 2010, the building was demolished but the grand and ornate façade was retained and modernised; a new block of flats was built behind it.

The area was heavily damaged during the Blitz in the Second World War. The Plaistow North area is largely made up of a local authority housing estate, which was constructed in the 1960s on a bomb-damaged site. The estate used to include five 14-storey 1960s tower blocks, but much has changed since and the area has undergone a major redevelopment programme. The Black Lion public house was frequented by West Ham United football players especially such as Bobby Moore in the 1960s and '70s with several West Ham footballers spotted in the area since.

In 1965, Plaistow became part of the new London Borough of Newham, formed when West Ham joined with the County Borough of East Ham and small parts of Barking and Woolwich.

=== 1995–present ===
Just before the end of the 1990s, a £92 million regeneration programme known as the Forest Gate and Plaistow SRB5 got under way, with the aim of renewing and revitalising neighbourhoods, creating jobs, building new homes and improving many existing ones.

West Ham and Plaistow New Deal for Communities (NDC) was part of a government programme designed to tackle social exclusion, community safety, unemployment and low educational attainment in areas of severe need throughout the country. It was awarded £54.6 million to bring about improvements to the local area over a ten-year period to 2010, with the intention of improving the quality of life and providing more opportunities for residents in the West Ham and Plaistow area.

In March 2010, the NDC set up Newham New Deal Partnership (Newham NDP), a not-for-profit organisation, to continue providing community benefit to the NDC area and beyond, and continue the work carried out over the ten years of the NDC Programme. Newham NDP works in partnership with the East London Business Alliance, East Thames Group, London Borough of Newham and One Housing Group to provide community benefits to the area either directly or in partnership with other stakeholders.

In March 2011, the Memorial Community Church was awarded money by the Big Lottery Fund Reaching Communities programme, to improve community facilities there.

On 10 December 2012, Plaistow South was named as one of fifty areas of England to share in a Big Lottery Scheme grant of £200 million. Plaistow South received £1 million to fund locally-designed projects to improve the area. In January 2013, councillors approved a new housing development of both private and affordable homes on the site of the old Plaistow Hospital. Construction began in March 2013 with completion of Phase 1 in 2015 and Phase 2 in 2016.

== Governance ==
Plaistow is part of the West Ham and Beckton constituency for elections to the House of Commons.

Plaistow is part of the Plaistow North, Plaistow South and Plaistow West & Canning Town East wards for elections to Newham London Borough Council.

== Transport ==
=== Railways ===
Plaistow and Upton Park underground stations are in the district, in London fare zone 3. Both are served by the London Underground's District and Hammersmith & City lines, which link the area directly to destinations in Central London, including Tower Hill, King's Cross St Pancras, Westminster and Paddington. Eastbound trains run towards Barking, Dagenham and Upminster.

West Ham station is less than one mile away, in fare zones 2 and 3. The station is on the Jubilee line and Docklands Light Railway (DLR), which links the area directly to several key destinations and interchanges, including Stratford, London City Airport, London Bridge and London Waterloo.

Stratford station is also nearby, to the north of the district, which is served by the Central and Jubilee lines, DLR and National Rail trains. This links the area to destinations across North East London, Essex and East Anglia. Canning Town station is to Plaistow's south-west on the Jubilee line and the DLR.

Since 2022, the area has also been linked directly to London Heathrow Airport and Reading, via the Elizabeth line from the nearby Custom House station.

=== Buses ===
Plaistow is on the London Buses network, served by routes: 5, 69, 115, 147, 241, 262, 276, 300, 325, 330, 473, 678 and N15. Routes 69 and night bus N15 run overnight through Plaistow.

=== Cycling ===
The Greenway, a shared-use path, runs through the area. The route runs unbroken from Hackney Wick to Plaistow, via the Queen Elizabeth Olympic Park, Stratford and West Ham. Eastbound, the route runs towards Newham University Hospital, East Ham, Beckton and Cycle Superhighway 3 towards Barking. The Greenway runs atop Joseph Bazalgette's Northern Outfall Sewer. It is a part of Transport for London's cycle network, numbered Cycleway 22.

Cycle Superhighway 2 (CS2) runs along the northern edge of Plaistow, through Stratford. The route runs non-stop and mostly traffic-free westbound towards the City, via Bow, Mile End and Whitechapel.

Cycle Superhighway 3 (CS3) runs along the southern edge of Plaistow. The route runs non-stop and mostly traffic-free towards the City, via Canning Town, Poplar and Limehouse. The route continues beyond the City traffic-free to Lancaster Gate (Hyde Park), via Westminster and Buckingham Palace, providing Plaistow with a direct, continuous cycle link to destinations in the West End. Eastbound, CS3 runs to Barking.

=== Roads ===
Plaistow is linked to other areas of London and South East England by road, including:

- A112 High Street | Greengate Street | Prince Regent Lane - Southbound to the A13 , London City Airport and North Woolwich; Northbound to Stratford, Leyton and Waltham Abbey.
- A114 Stopford Road – Northbound to Upton, Leytonstone and Whipps Cross.
- A124 Barking Road – south-west to Canning Town and the A13 ; north-east towards East Ham, Barking and Upminster.

The A13 runs along the southernmost edge of Plaistow. The road runs westbound towards the City of London, passing Canning Town, Poplar, and Canary Wharf en route. Eastbound, the road carries traffic towards Barking, Dagenham, the M25 , Tilbury and Southend-on-Sea.

== Education ==
Nathan Kemp, assistant headteacher at Tollgate Primary School in Plaistow, won Teacher of the Year in the 2012 annual national Teaching Awards.

Michael Patient of Tollgate was one of the winners of a Pearson teaching award in 2014, winning a silver award for outstanding new teacher of the year.

== In popular culture ==
The location for the video shoot of "(Keep Feeling) Fascination" by the Human League was a house painted entirely in orange, and surrounding terraced streets at the corner of First Avenue and Third Avenue in Plaistow. The area has since been redeveloped.

"Plaistow Patricia" is a song from the highly acclaimed album New Boots and Panties!! by Ian Dury and the Blockheads released in 1977.

In the graphic novel V for Vendetta, written by Alan Moore and illustrated by David Lloyd, Doctor Delia Surridge lives in Plaistow.

== Media ==
Voice of Africa Radio (VOAR) was a multilanguage internet and local radio station broadcasting from Plaistow. It was set up on 1 January 2000 and began as an unlicensed broadcaster, not obtaining a broadcast licence until 16 February 2006. It was the first licensed African radio station in the UK, but had its licence revoked by Ofcom on 4 March 2016 for persistent failure to broadcast.

== Sport and leisure ==
Parks in the area include the 9.5 acres (3.8 ha) Plaistow Park, which was known as Balaam Street Recreation Ground from its opening in 1894 to its renaming in 1999), and the 10 acres (4 ha) Memorial Park, which merges into the East London Cemetery. There are several small parks in the area, with the large West Ham Park 1 mile (1.6 km) north.

Newham Leisure Centre, Newham University Hospital and Newham Sixth Form College's main campus are in the area; the latter lies in the south-east, near to the hospital.

The Terence McMillan Stadium, named for the first mayor of Newham, Terence McMillan, who occupied the position in 1965–1966, is located in Plaistow, close to the hospital and the college. It is the former home of the Newham and Essex Beagles track and field athletics club and part of the Newham Leisure Centre.

East End Road Runners is a running club based at the Newham Leisure Centre and was the recipient of England Athletics' award for London Development Club of the Year in 2011. Non-league football teams Athletic Newham (formerly Lopes Tavares) and Fire United Christian play at the Terence McMillan Stadium, which also became the home ground of Clapton, rivals of Athletic Newham in the Essex Senior League, in 2020.

The West Ham Boys' Amateur Boxing Club is located at the rear of the Black Lion public house in High Street.

The 59 Club, a charitable motorcycle club, is based in Plaistow and located in the Swift Centre in Barking Road.

== Notable residents ==
=== Arts and entertainment ===
Aaron Hill, writer and dramatist, lived at Hyde House during his retirement and until his death in 1750. William Holl the Younger, noted portrait and figure engraver, was born in Plaistow in 1807.

Singers David Essex, Ronnie Lane, Sandra Kerr, Jade Ewen, Mumzy Stranger and Alison Hinds were born in Plaistow, as was comedian and folk singer Richard Digance. Singer and entertainer Joe Brown was born in Lincolnshire, but lived in Plaistow from the age of two. Record producer Norman Newell was born in Plaistow.

A number of grime MCs and DJs have origins in Plaistow, including Ghetts, Durrty Goodz and Crazy Titch. Rapper 21 Savage was born in Plaistow and moved as a youth to Atlanta in the United States.

Actor Terence Stamp attended Tollgate Primary School and Plaistow Grammar School. Actor Honor Blackman was born in Plaistow, as were actors Jimmy Akingbola, Ron Pember and Roberta Taylor, and comedian, actor and playwright Andi Osho.

=== Sport ===
Multi-times Olympic athlete Fred Alsop was born in Plaistow in 1938.

England international footballers Sol Campbell, Tony Cottee, Rob Lee and Martin Peters were born in Plaistow.

England international speedway rider Reg Fearman was from Plaistow. He managed England and Great Britain national teams, and was also chairman of the British Speedway Promoters' Association.

Edward Temme, born in Plaistow, was a member of the British Olympic Water Polo teams of 1928 and 1936; he was the first man to swim the English Channel in both directions. He is reputed to have swum non-stop in both directions and to have achieved this feat twice.

=== Other ===
Other famous residents have included:

- William Clowes, one of England's early surgeons whose books were the leading surgical writings of the Elizabethan age, who spent his retirement in Plaistow until his death in 1604.
- Sir Thomas Foot, Lord Mayor of London, who used Hyde House in High Street as his seat in the 17th century.
- William Dodd, clergyman who was hanged for forgery, lived on Balaam Street 1754 to 1766.
- Edmund Burke PC, Irish statesman and author who moved to England and became a Whig MP, who lived in Plaistow c.1759–1761 on Balaam Street.
- George Edwards, sometimes referred to as the father of British ornithology, who retired to Plaistow in 1763 until his death in 1773.
- Luke Howard, who devised the naming and classification of clouds and cloud formations in 1802 that are still in popular use today. He also operated a business in pharmaceuticals in Plaistow from 1796 until 1803 when he moved the business to nearby Stratford. He continued to reside in Plaistow until 1812, when he moved to Tottenham. The family's pharmaceutical business was instrumental in the development of quinine, and both Howard and his son, quinologist John Eliot Howard, born in Plaistow in 1807, were elected Fellows of the Royal Society.
- Robert Humphrey Marten, businessperson and reformer, who lived in Plaistow from 1807 until his death in 1839.
- Winifred Langton, communist, internationalist and activist born in Plaistow in 1909.
- Roderic Gregory, biologist and professor of physiology, who isolated gastrin (the stimulator of gastric acid), born in Plaistow in 1913 and awarded the CBE in 1971.
- Sir David Amess, who was born in Plaistow in 1952, was a Conservative MP, representing Basildon from 1983 to 1997 and Southend West from 1997 until he was murdered in 2021. Amess was knighted in the 2015 New Year Honours.
