= Jake's Progress =

Jake's Progress is the title of two albums and a TV series:

- Jake's Progress (album), a 1969 album by Jake Thackray
- Jake's Progress (TV series), a TV miniseries written by Alan Bleasdale.
- Jake's Progress (soundtrack), a 1995 soundtrack album to the above series by Elvis Costello and Richard Harvey
