= Antoine Pol =

French poet

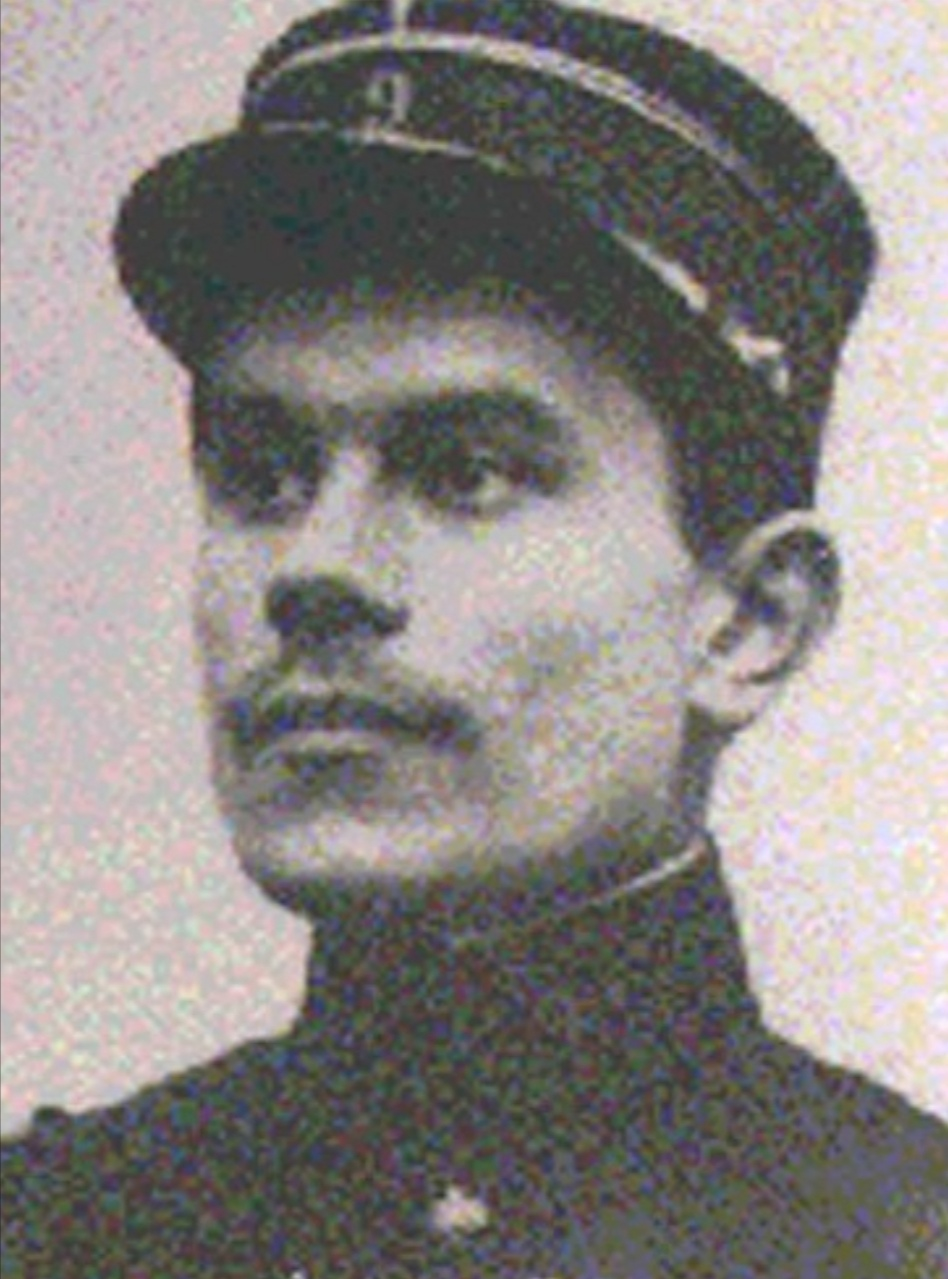
- Born: 23 August 1888; Douai, France
- Died: 21 June 1971 (aged 82); Seine-Port

Antoine Pol (23 August 1888 in Douai – 21 June 1971 in Seine-Port) was a French officer, businessman, and poet who became famous for a poem he wrote in 1911, published in 1918 as "The Passers-by" (Les Passantes) and composed and performed by Georges Brassens in 1972 on his album "Fernande".

== Biography ==
Antoine-François Paul was born to Florimond Paul and Celeste Julia Lesmesas. After attending the Lycée Albert-Châtelet school in Douai between 1893 and 1906, he was admitted in 1909 to the École centrale Paris, where he graduated as an arts and manufacturing engineer, class of 1913.

In 1911 he wrote the poem "The Passers-by", and in 1913 he was appointed second lieutenant in the artillery, and in 1914 he was recruited to the 9th Artillery Regiment.

On August 3rd, 1915 he married Yvonne Marie Jeanne Manbaud, daughter of Colonel Henri-Pierre Manbaud (1860–1924).

In 1916 he was promoted to lieutenant, in 1918 to captain, and ended the war with the Croix de Guerre. He then published his collection of poems, Emotions poétiques. In January 1919 he was in charge of the operation of the German mines, in the service of the Lorraine iron mines. From April 1921 to April 1925 he served as commercial director of the La Houve mines in Strasbourg.

In 1932 he became general manager of the Établissements Châtel & Dollfus, a fuel trading company in Paris, and later became its chairman.

In 1949 he was elected president of the Central Syndicate of Coal Importers in France.

After retiring in 1959, he devoted his time to poetry, bibliophily, and butterflies.

He died at the age of 82 in 1971 shortly before he was about to meet Georges Brassens for the first time.

== Les Passantes ==
Antoine Paul is best known as the author of the poem "The Passers-by", which was composed and performed by Georges Brassens in 1972 on the album "Fernande".

The poem received enthusiastic reviews in the French daily La Croix described as "a poetic collection that will appeal to enthusiastic souls" and in "Le Petit Comtois" who wrote "How can one not love this poet, husband and father, who sees with the light of his heart (the name of one of his most charming sonnets) so many things that others do not see?"

Georges Brassens discovered the poem in a bookstore in 1942 and first composed it. He then forgot about it and reworked it many times until 1969. Wanting to record it, he sought to locate Antoine Paul to obtain his permission, but only in 1970 he got it. Brassens asked to meet Paul to get to know him and play him the melody he had composed for "The Passers-by and the Returners". Antoine Paul was happy to hear this, but died in June before they could meet. The song premiered at the Bobino Concert Hall in Montparnasse in December 1972.

In 2023, the history of Les Passantes inspired the theatrical production L'improbable histoire des Passantes, written by Gérald Duchemin (in collaboration with Hervé Masquelier). The play premiered at the Festival Off d'Avignon and featured Hervé Masquelier in the leading role

== Bibliography ==
- 1918: Émotions poétiques
- 1924: Le Livre de maman
- 1941: Destins, poèmes de ce temps et de toujours
- 1947: Plaisirs d'amour
- 1970: Croquis
- 1971: Coktails
- Les Passantes (poem)
