= Quaker Bible =

1764 English translation by Anthony Purver

- Full name: A new and literal translation of all the books of the Old and New Testament; with notes critical and explanatory
- Complete Bible published: 1764
- Copyright: Public domain
- Genesis 1:1–3 God created the Heaven and the Earth at the Beginning. The Earth However was vacant and void, and Darkneſs overwhelmed the Deep; but the Spirit of God hovered atop of the water.Firſt God ſaid, Let there be light; which there was accordingly. John 3:16 For God thus loved the World, ſo that he gave his only begotten Son, that every one who believes in him may not periſh, but have everlaſting Life.

The Quaker Bible, officially A new and literal translation of all the books of the Old and New Testament; with notes critical and explanatory, is the 1764 translation of the Christian Bible into English by Anthony Purver (1702–1777), a Quaker. The translation was published in two Volumes in London by W. Richardson and S. Clark in 1764, but is not generally regarded as successful.

== Comparison with the New English Bible ==
In 1970, following the publication of the New English Bible, Harold A. Guy wrote an article printed in the Expository Times; "An Eighteenth Century New English Bible", discussing Purver's Bible translation. Guy makes no further reference to the NEB to justify the analogy claimed by the title of his article.

Whilst both Purver's Bible and the New English Bible endured long gestation periods, that is where any similarity ends. Nevertheless, exploring the attempted analogy can help to highlight certain factors about Purver's version:

- Purver was a self-taught translator and laboured for 30 years with the project single-handed – compared to the New English Bible which involved a large number of academics.
- Failing to interest a publisher, Purver sold the manuscript for £1,000 to Dr. John Fothergill who published the Bible at his own expense. The two volumes sold for four guineas. There is no evidence of any volume of sales. This was in contrast to the New English Bible, which was backed before publication by the mainstream Churches in Great Britain and Northern Ireland (including the London Yearly Meeting of the Religious Society of Friends), and had a built in user base. Sales had already been "road tested" by the sales of the New Testament published in 1961.
- Unlike the Purver version the New English Bible was launched with nationwide publicity.
- In 1764, the Purver version was a novelty, as in the 18th century there was only one translation which held the field, and that was the King James Version. The New English Bible followed on from a number of versions, notably the Revised Standard Version.
- Despite the fact that the Purver Bible had no other competitors as an alternative to the King James Version, the Bible was not successful and although Purver prepared a second edition, it failed to see the light of day. The New English Bible in contrast, whilst receiving widespread criticism, has gone on to a second edition as the Revised English Bible.

Despite the failed analogy, in his article Harold Guy does preserve some details of the story behind the Purver version, and provides some examples of the text.

== Failure ==
A portion of Purver's translation was published in parts about 1742 by Felix Farley of Bristol, but the publication received little support. Purver failed to get the whole text published, and gained no backing for his venture, even by the Religious Society of Friends. Even when the Manuscript was published by Dr. John Fothergill at his own expense, the full translation also failed to make any impression.

Various reasons can be advanced for the failure of Purver's translation; lack of publicity; the fact that it lacked authority (a one-man translation) and it had not been backed by any Church, not even the Religious Society of Friends, to which Purver belonged. Yet the failure to make its mark may owe itself to the deficiencies of his translation.

By some it is held to be an unreliable translation; The Dictionary of National Biography records that Purver "…on arriving at a difficult passage, he would shut himself up for two or three days and nights, waiting for inspiration". Charles Haddon Spurgeon, who was acquainted with Purver's version remarks "A Quaker Translation. Often ungrammatical and unintelligible. Not without its good points, but much more curious than useful."
