= St Philip and St James' Church, Plaistow =

Coordinates: 51°31′26.153″N 0°1′15.876″E

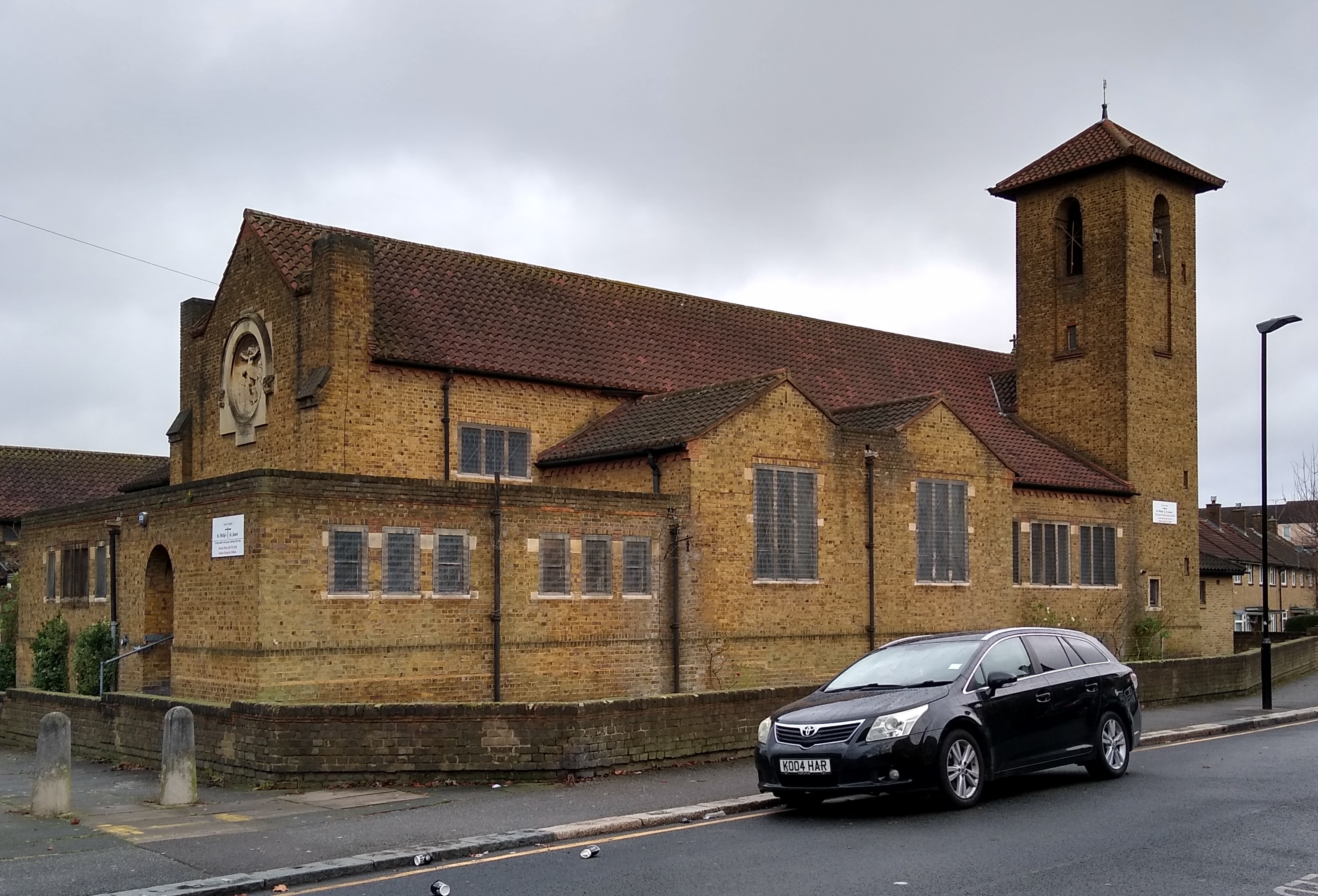
St Philip and St James' Church

St Philip and St James’ Church is a Church of England church in Plaistow, east London. It originated as two churches before being merged into the joint parish of St Philip and St James in 1955. That parish in its turn became part of the Parish of the Divine Compassion along with three other parishes in Plaistow and Canning Town - St Mary's, St Matthias' and St Martin's.

== St Philip's ==
It was founded as a small mission church built on Whitwell Road in 1860 by St Mary's Church. It was taken on by the Society of Divine Compassion in 1894 but destroyed in 1941 during the London Blitz. The foundation stone for a new building was laid in 1954.

Between 1876 and 1882, the Guild of St Alban the Martyr, an Anglo-Catholic settlement, worked closely with St Philip's Church, as a mission of St Andrew's Plaistow.

It originated in Forest Gate as an iron building opened around 1870 to serve a conventional district. It became a parish in 1881, formed from those of Emmanuel Church, St John's and All Saints
