= St Matthias' Church, Canning Town =

Coordinates: 51°31′23.786″N 0°0′39.048″E

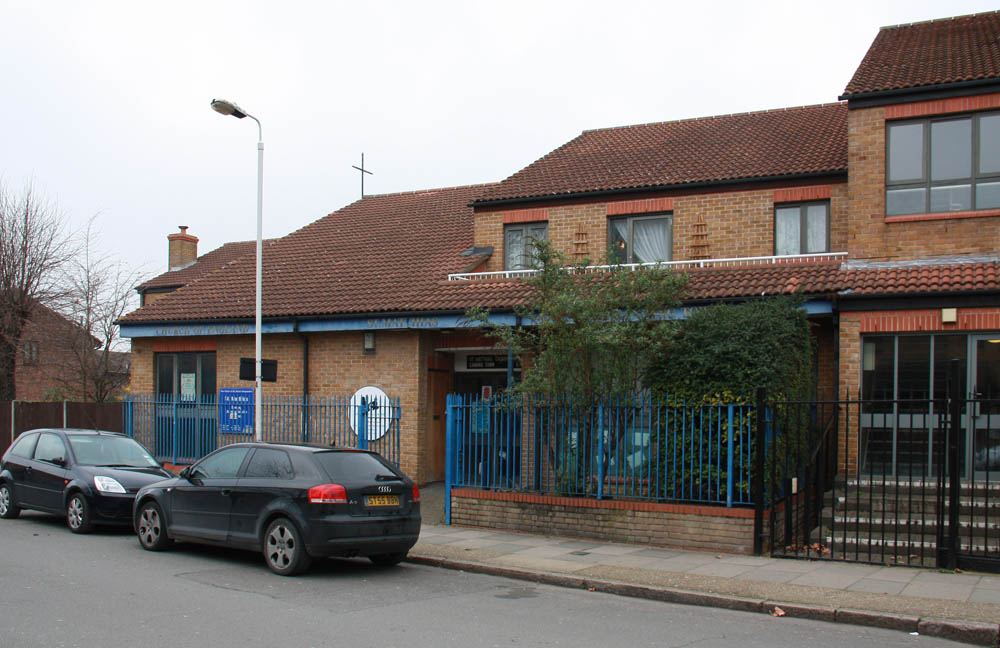
St Matthias' Church

St Matthias' Church is a Church of England parish church in Canning Town, east London. The modern building comprises a chapel, community rooms and a home for residents with disabilities.

== History ==
The origins of St Matthias Church in Canning town are found in 1887 with a gospel mission from St Mary's Church, Plaistow. It was named after St Matthias' Church in Torquay, which had assisted with funding the mission.

In 1906 the mission merged with that of St Cyprian on Beaconsfield Road. In 1907 a permanent church building was built and a parish formed.

This parish contained sections of the parish of St Mary's, St Andrew's and St Gabriel's. In 1961 parts of the parish of Holy Trinity and more from St Gabriel's were added. With the three churches of St Mary's Church, St Martin's, and St Philip and St James’, it formed part of the Parish of the Divine Compassion.

By 1989 the original church building was demolished and replaced in 1991 by an integrated chapel, community rooms and home for residents with disabilities.

== Present day ==
In 2016, St Matthias' Church received a planted congregation from neighbouring church All Hallows Bow at the invitation of the Bishop of Barking. All Hallows had itself been the recipient of a church plant project in 2010 involving St Paul's Shadwell (itself the recipient of one from Holy Trinity Brompton in 2005) and has since seen significant growth. Details of this can be found in a report by The Centre for Theology & Community entitled 'Love, Sweat and Tears: Church Planting in East London'

== Sources ==
- A History of the County of Essex: Volume 6. Originally published by Victoria County History, London, 1973; Pages 114-123
