= St Peter's Church, Upton Cross =

Former church in Newham, London, England

Coordinates: 51°32′22.141″N 0°1′23.508″E

St Peter's Church was a Church of England church on Upton Lane in the Upton Cross area of Newham, East London. Its origins were in a mission of St Mary's Church, Plaistow on Pelly Road, holding services in a barn then in an iron church. Joseph Lister's former home Upton House was bought by the bishop of St Albans in 1885, becoming the vicarage, whilst its garden provided the site for a permanent church, built in 1893 and given a separate parish the following year using parts of those of All Saints, St Mary's, Emmanuel and St Stephen's. The parish was merged into that of Emmanuel in 1962 - the church was left standing as a chapel of ease to Emmanuel, but its vicarage was demolished, the site being sold in 1968. Funds from that sale and the sale of the parish hall were intended for a new church, church hall and clergy house, but in 1972 St Peter's Church was declared redundant, demolished and its site sold off, leading to the scheme's abandonment three years later.
