= John Fothergill (physician) =

English physician and plant collector

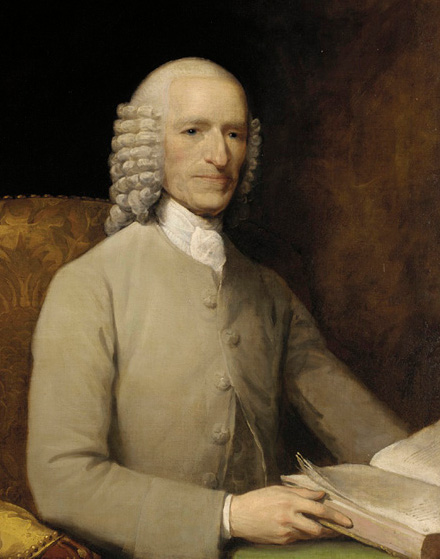
John Fothergill by Gilbert Stuart

John Fothergill FRS (8 March 1712 – 26 December 1780) was an English physician, plant collector, philanthropist and Quaker. His medical writings were influential, and he built up a sizeable botanic garden in what is now West Ham Park in London.

== Life and work ==
Fothergill was born at Carr End, near Bainbridge in Yorkshire, the son of John Fothergill (1676–1745), a Quaker preacher and farmer, and his first wife, Margaret Hough (1677–1719). After studying at Sedbergh School, Fothergill was apprenticed to an apothecary. In 1736, he obtained the degree of Doctor of Medicine at Edinburgh and followed this by further studies at St Thomas's Hospital, London. After visiting continental Europe in 1740, he settled in London, where he gained an extensive practice. During the influenza epidemics of 1775 and 1776, he is said to have treated 60 patients a day.

In 1745, Fothergill gave a brief lecture to the Royal Society of London, citing the work of a Scottish physician and surgeon, William Tossach (c. 1700–1771). This is the first known lecture on the practice of mouth-to-mouth ventilation. He is also credited with first identifying and naming trigeminal neuralgia in his work Of a Painful Affection of the Face in 1773. He also wrote about angina and diphtheria.

Fothergill's pamphlet Account of the Sore Throat attended with Ulcers (1748) contains one of the first descriptions of streptococcal sore throat in English and was translated into several languages. His rejection of ineffective traditional therapies for the disease saved many lives. He was a personal friend of Benjamin Franklin. He also supported the publication of Franklin's papers on electricity and wrote a preface to them.

== Botanist and Quaker ==
Fothergill made a study of conchology and botany in his leisure time. In 1762, he bought Upton House in West Ham, Essex (now in Greater London), where he built up an extensive botanical garden and grew many rare plants obtained from various parts of the world (now West Ham Park). In the garden, with its glasshouses, John Coakley Lettsom (1744–1815), a Quaker physician and a protégé of his, exclaimed that "the sphere seemed transposed, as the Arctic Circle joined with the equator". Lettsom published a catalogue of Fothergill's garden: Hortus Uptonensis, or a catalogue of the plants in the Dr Fothergill's garden at Upton, at the time of his decease anno 1780. Fothergilla is named in his honour. The standard author abbreviation Foth. is used to indicate him when citing a botanical name. He was elected a Fellow of the Royal Society in 1763 and became a member of the American Philosophical Society in 1770.

Fothergill was the patron of Sydney Parkinson, the South Sea voyager, and of William Bartram, the American botanist in his southern travels of 1773–1776. A translation of the Bible, known as the Quaker Bible, made by Anthony Purver, was fashioned and printed at his expense. He founded Ackworth School, Pontefract, Yorkshire in 1779.

John Fothergill died in London on 26 December 1780 aged 68, of urinary retention perhaps linked with prostate cancer. Fanny Burney, having earlier described him as "an upright, stern old man... an old prig," later recorded when she was his patient: "He really has been... amazingly civil and polite to me... as kind as he is skilful." His niece Betty Fothergill described him in her journal as "surely the first of men. With the becoming dignity of age he unites the cheerfulness and liberality of youth. He possesses the most virtues and the fewest failings of any man I know".

Barbara Wheeler's father was attended during his illness by Dr. Fothergill in 1777. She and her brother, Daniel Wheeler, were inspired to convert to Quakerism after the meeting. In 1815, she thus refers to the Quaker physician in her autobiography:

And here I cannot help bearing testimony to the memory of the late Dr. Fothergill, the first Quaker I ever saw, whose presence was never waited for by the mournful family above a minute or two beyond the time fixed for his coming. His gentle though firm demeanour calmed sorrow into silence. His penetrating eye and abstracted thought always inspired confidence in his judgment, though there might not appear a least prospect of success. To him, my father spoke of his concerns as to a friend, and of his complaints as to a physician of distinguished skill.

— Barbara Wheeler

== See also ==
- Fothergill's sign
