= Pauvre Martin =

1953 song by Georges Brassens

"Pauvre Martin" ("Poor Martin") is a 1953 song by the French singer Georges Brassens. It first appeared on his album, Le Vent.

In this sad and melancholic song, inspired by the work of François Villon, Brassens evokes the situation of agricultural workers and small landowners who toil on small farms and who derive a living wage, modestly, without complaint. The song was covered by Barbara in 1969.
