= St Martin's Church, Plaistow =

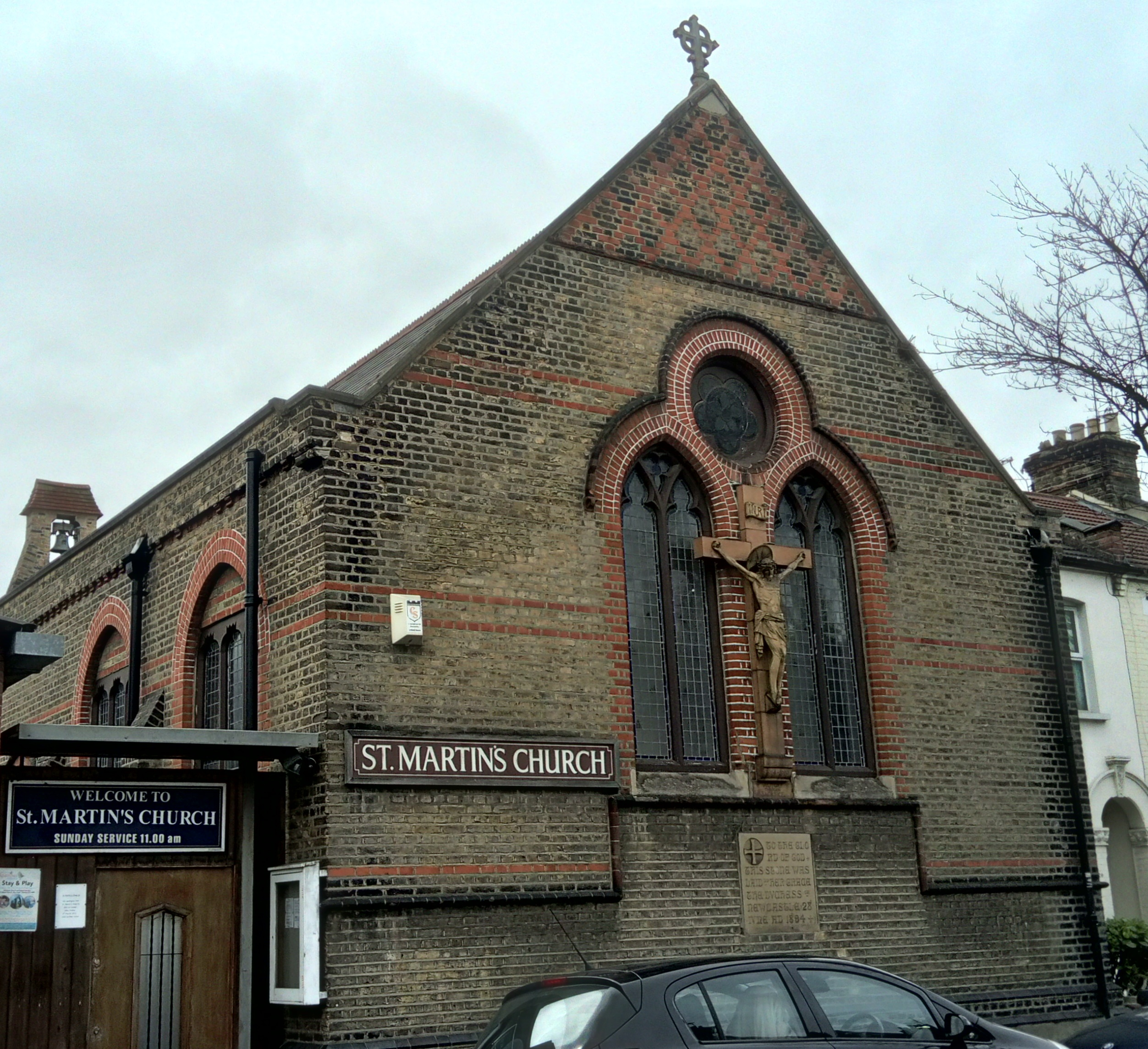
- St Martin's Church, Plaistow
- 51°31′45.966″N 0°2′14.874″E
- Location: Plaistow, Newham
- Country: England
- Denomination: Church of England
- Churchmanship: Anglo-Catholic
- Website: https://www.achurchnearyou.com/church/6534/

History
- Status: Active
- Dedication: Martin of Tours
- Consecrated: 1894

Administration
- Province: Canterbury
- Diocese: Chelmsford
- Archdeaconry: Archdeacon of West Ham|West Ham
- Deanery: Newham
- Parish: Plaistow, St Martin

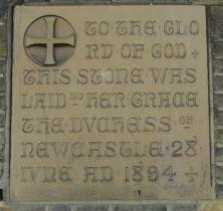
The foundation stone of the church.

St Martin's Church is a part of the Church of England on Boundary Road in Plaistow, Newham, East London. It was built in 1894 as a mission church, with the foundation stone laid on 28 June that year by Henrietta Pelham-Clinton (née Hope), Dowager Duchess of Newcastle and widow of the 6th Duke of Newcastle, who also funded the opening of St Thomas' Roman Catholic Church in Woodford the following year.

Until 1997 its parish hall was in timber, with a World War Two bomb shelter attached - that year the firm Cottrell and Vermeulen refurbished the hall and added a community building and housing. With the three churches of St Mary's Church, Plaistow, St Matthias’ Church, Canning Town and St Philip and St James’ Church, Plaistow, it formed part of the Parish of the Divine Compassion until 19 October 2017.

From October 2017 St Martin's became a separate parish for the first time in many decades.

Rev Canon Ann Easter was ministry for the next two years, and on 2 May 2019 Rev Canon Jeanette Meadway became Vicar of St Martin's.

In July 2019 regular Masses in Portuguese were started at St Martin's Church and in March 2021 regular Masses in Spanish were also started.
