= Edward Temme =

British swimmer and water polo player

- Born: Edward Harry Temme; 16 September 1904; Plaistow, Essex, England
- Died: 20 June 1978 (aged 73); Padua, Veneto, Italy
- Occupation(s): Swimmer; insurance clerk

Edward Harry Temme (16 September 1904 – 20 June 1978) was an English swimmer and insurance clerk.

Temme was the first man to swim across the English Channel both ways, from France to England on 5 August 1927 and from England to France on 18 August 1934. He was also a water polo player who competed in the 1928 Summer Olympics in Amsterdam and the 1936 Summer Olympics in Berlin.

== Biography ==
Temme was born in Stratford Road, Plaistow, Essex (now part of east London). He was a member of the British water polo team that finished fourth at the 1928 Summer Olympics, playing in four matches. Eight years later, he was part of the British team that finished eighth at the 1936 Summer Olympics, playing in six matches.

Temme kept his job as an insurance clerk and trained to cross the English Channel after work and at weekends. He was 6 feet 2 inches (1.88 m) tall and weighed 200 pounds (91 kg). He swam from France to England on 5 August 1927, starting at Cap Gris-Nez near Calais and reaching Lydden Spout, near Dover, in 14½ hours. He died in Padua, Veneto, Italy.
