= Voice of Africa Radio =

Coordinates: 51°31′45.6″N 0°1′19″E

Voice of Africa Radio (also known as VOAR) was a London-based FM radio station, founded on 1 January 2000 to correct the exclusion and marginalisation of the African community from the electronic media. Initially, the station operated unlicensed, covering the Greater London area on 107.7 MHz. It attracted a wide range of African businesses that advertised and sponsored most of its programmes. Listeners were mainly the youth, but also various African High Commissioners and Heads of State.

Voice of Africa Radio finally won its bid for a five-year permanent FM licence in London on 16 February 2006, after six years of campaigning, making it the first and only legally licensed African radio station in the UK. Its offices are based in Plaistow.

The station went live on 20 August 2007, with a range of African music spanning the continent of Africa and several phone–in programmes which discuss issues that are pertinent to Africans at local, national and international level.

After experiencing problems with pirate radio stations operating on the assigned frequency (94.3 MHz), Ofcom proposed changing the station's carrier frequency to 94.0 MHz which took effect in February 2011.

The station lost its licence in March 2016 after being unable to broadcast for a lengthy period of time.
