= St Thomas' Church, Plaistow =

Church in England from 1898 to 1950

Coordinates: 51.532382°N 0.028946°E

St Thomas' Church, Plaistow was a Church of England church on Northern Road in Plaistow, Newham. It opened in 1898 as a mission church of St Mary's Church, Plaistow. It was demolished around 1950.
