= St Katherine's Church, Plaistow =

Church of England church

Coordinates: 51.53390°N 0.02019°E

St Katherine's Church, Plaistow was a Church of England church on Chapman Road in Plaistow, Newham. It opened in 1891 as a mission church of St Mary's Church, Plaistow, using a building that had earlier been used to house the infant department of that church's day schools. In 1894 a permanent church was completed. In 1965 it was demolished for redevelopment.
