= The Last Will and Testament of Jake Thackray =

Studio album by Jake Thackray
- Released: 1967
- Recorded: August 1967
- Studio: Chappells Recording Studios, London
- Genre: Baroque folk; chanson; orchestral pop
- Length: 40:42
- Label: EMI
- Producer: Norman Newell

Jake Thackray chronology
The Last Will and Testament of Jake Thackray (1967)	Jake's Progress (1969)

Professional ratings
Review scores
Source	Rating
Allmusic	4.5/5 stars

The Last Will and Testament of Jake Thackray is the debut album by Jake Thackray. It was produced by Norman Newell in August 1967 and released on LP that year by EMI in the UK and Philips Records in the USA. The record company, unsure of how the public would respond to Thackray's lugubrious voice accompanied only by his guitar, added orchestral arrangements by Roger Webb and Geoff Love to many of the songs.

The album is now out of print, but its songs, digitally remastered, are included in the four-CD retrospective Jake in a Box. The fourth CD of the set also contains 26 songs recorded in April 1967, including the earlier version of the album (originally mono) and 13 other tracks. They include unreleased solo (vocal and guitar) versions of all the songs that are recorded with orchestral arrangements on the album, with the exception of "The Black Swan".

The song "Lah-Di-Dah" has been covered as a duet by Petula Clark and Rod McKuen, and by the band Sky Larkin.

== Musical style ==
The album differs from Thackray's subsequent albums in that many of its songs feature lush orchestral accompaniment. In their book Beware of the Bull - The Enigmatic Genius of Jake Thackray, Thompson and Watterson write that the use of orchestra on "Ulysses" and "The Statues" adds appropriate touches of colour and drama, and that "The Black Swan" evokes the romantic balladry of Jacques Brel, whom Thackray admired. However, they write that other songs lose the “charming intimacy” of Thackray's original demos, and call "Jumble Sale" a “brash and busy rumba”. The rich accompaniment meant that Thackray had to overdub his vocals, which felt unnatural to him as a solo folk singer who would commonly use a flexible tempo in his songs for dramatic or comedic effect. Future albums would feature only Thackray's voice with little more than upright bass and guitar accompaniment, allowing him a less metrically rigid and more expressive vocal approach.

== Track listing ==
All tracks are written by Jake Thackray.

Side 1
No.	Title	Length
1.	"Lah-Di-Dah" (Performed with Roger Webb and his orchestra)	3:11
2.	"Country Bus" (Performed with accompaniment directed by Geoff Love)	3:55
3.	"The Cactus"	3:21
4.	"Scallywag" (Performed with accompaniment directed by Geoff Love)	4:25
5.	"The Black Swan" (Performed with Roger Webb and his orchestra)	3:00

Side 2
No.	Title	Length
1.	"Jumble Sale" (Performed with accompaniment directed by Geoff Love)	3:32
2.	"The Little Black Foal" (Performed with accompaniment directed by Geoff Love)	3:02
3.	"Personal Column"	3:59
4.	"Ulysses" (Performed with Roger Webb and his orchestra)	4:37
5.	"The Statues" (Performed with Roger Webb and his orchestra)	3:44
6.	"The Last Will and Testament of Jake Thackray" (Performed with Roger Webb and his orchestra)	3:00
