= Jake Thackray =

English singer-songwriter, poet and journalist (1938-2002)

Background information
- Born: John Philip Thackray; 27 February 1938; Kirkstall, Leeds, West Riding of Yorkshire, England
- Died: 24 December 2002 (aged 64) Monmouth, Wales
- Genres: Folk; chanson; satire
- Occupations: Singer-songwriter; musician; poet; humourist; journalist
- Instruments: Vocals; guitar
- Years active: 1967–1991
- Label: EMI

John Philip "Jake" Thackray (27 February 1938 – 24 December 2002) was an English singer-songwriter, poet, humourist and journalist. Best known in the late 1960s and early 1970s for his topical comedy songs performed on British television, his work ranged from satirical to bawdy to sentimental to pastoral, with a strong emphasis on storytelling, making him difficult to categorise.

Thackray sang in a lugubrious baritone voice, accompanying himself on a nylon-strung guitar in a style that was part classical, part jazz. His witty lyrics and clipped delivery, combined with his strong Yorkshire accent and the northern setting of many of his songs, led to his being described as the "North Country Noël Coward", a comparison Thackray resisted, although he acknowledged his lyrics were in the English tradition of Coward and Flanders and Swann, "who are wordy, funny writers". However, his tunes derived from the French chansonnier tradition: he claimed Georges Brassens as his greatest inspiration and he was also influenced by Jacques Brel and Charles Trenet. He also admired Randy Newman. He was admired by, and has influenced, many performers including Jarvis Cocker, Alex Turner, Benjamin Clementine, Mike Harding, Momus, Ralph McTell, Morrissey, and Jasper Carrott.

== Early life ==
John Philip Thackray was born in Leeds, West Riding of Yorkshire, the son of Ernest Thackray, a policeman, and Ivy May Thackray, née Armitage. He was educated at the Jesuit St. Michael's College in Leeds and St David's College, a Catholic boarding seminary in Dolgellau, north-west Wales. He considered joining the priesthood but instead chose to study English Literature and Language at Durham University. After graduation he spent three years abroad teaching English, mainly in France – in Lille, in Brittany and in the Pyrenees – but also including six months in Algeria at the height of the war for independence in 1961–1962. During his time in France he had some of his poetry published and discovered the chansonnier tradition and in particular the work of Georges Brassens. "I missed out on rock and all my influences were French," he would later say. In 1966, he had two brief columns – What is a Prof? and What is a Student? published in the BBC's The Listener magazine.

== Musical career ==
In 1963 Thackray returned to his native Yorkshire, teaching at Intake School in Rodley, Leeds. Teaching himself to play the guitar, he found that one way to get unruly pupils to take an interest in their studies was through his songs. This and performing in folk clubs led to appearances on local BBC radio programmes, which brought him to the attention of producer Norman Newell. Thackray recorded thirty demos with Newell, eleven of which were soon to be re-recorded and released as his debut album, The Last Will and Testament of Jake Thackray, in 1967. Many of the songs were given Newell’s trademark orchestral accompaniment in an attempt to broaden the album’s appeal beyond folk audiences. Its title track exhorted his friends to mark his death with a party, and then forget him. The album also included "Lah-Di-Dah", in which a prospective bridegroom assures his bride he loves her so much that he will try to be nice to her dreadful family.

This in turn led to a BBC television slot, composing a weekly topical song for Bernard Braden's consumer magazine programme Braden's Week. He was not immediately popular — his first appearance in late 1968 provoked letters demanding his dismissal — but he eventually won over the audience. After Braden's Week was cancelled in 1972, Thackray took up the same role on its successor show, That's Life!. In nearly thirty years of performing he would make over a thousand radio and TV appearances, including slots on The David Frost Show and Frost Over America, and his own show, Jake's Scene, on ITV.

In 1968, he married Sheila Marian Clarke-Irons, a 21-year-old student. His second album, Jake's Progress, was recorded at Abbey Road Studios while the Beatles put the finishing touches to their Abbey Road album next door. Released in 1969, it abandoned the orchestral arrangements of its predecessor for a small acoustic band. It included the song "The Blacksmith and the Toffee Maker", which Thackray adapted from a story in Laurie Lee's Cider with Rosie. He began recording a new album in 1970, but these recordings were scrapped. In 1971 he released Live Performance, a live recording of 14 songs from his 1970 performance at the Queen Elizabeth Hall in London (an expanded, 29-song double CD of the same performance would be released in 2006).

A third studio album, Bantam Cock, followed in 1972. Its title track became a folk standard and was covered by folk singer Fred Wedlock, folk group the Corries and comedian Jasper Carrott among others. Other songs included "Isabel Makes Love upon National Monuments", "Sister Josephine", and "Brother Gorilla", an English adaptation of Georges Brassens' "Le Gorille". In 1973 he opened for Brassens when he performed at the inauguration of the Sherman Theatre in Cardiff, which he would describe as the high spot of his career.

After Bantam Cock Thackray's television appearances continued, but his recording career stalled. A compilation album, The Very Best of Jake Thackray, was released in 1975. His final studio album, On Again! On Again!, appeared in 1977. Its title track, a comedic, long-winded tirade about women who talk too much, would see Thackray accused of misogyny, but the album also included "The Hair of the Widow of Bridlington", a song of female self-determination in the face of social disapproval. It also featured two more Brassens adaptations, "Isabella" (based on Brassens' "Marinette") and "Over to Isobel" (based on "Je rejoindrai ma belle"). The same year he published a book of lyrics, Jake's Progress, illustrated by Bill Tidy.

From the late 1970s, he had made most of his living on the live circuit, touring in Europe, North America and the Far East, but in 1981 he returned to television with Jake Thackray and Songs, a six-part series on BBC2 featuring Thackray and guests, including Richard and Linda Thompson and Ralph McTell, performing in a variety of venues. An album of the same name, recorded live at the Stables Theatre, Wavendon, Milton Keynes, as part of the recordings for the TV show, followed. A BBC-licensed DVD of Jake Thackray and Songs was released in 2014. Thackray's last release during his life was a compilation, Lah-Di-Dah, released in 1991.

Although he gave up teaching for show business, Thackray did not really like being what he called "a performing dick". He was uncomfortable with big audiences, and favoured pubs and community halls as performance venues in preference to grander ones such as the London Palladium (although he appeared there in a Royal Variety Performance). He became disillusioned with stage life. He is recorded as saying "I'd never liked the stage much and I was turning into a performing man, a real Archie Rice [the hack music hall comic in John Osborne's The Entertainer], so I cancelled gigs and pulled out". He was plagued by a self-doubt and a breakdown in confidence that Ralph McTell describes as "catastrophic". His style of work was also falling out of fashion: his literate, witty lyrics and tales of rural Yorkshire had little resonance in the punk and Thatcher years, folk audiences had lost interest in contemporary song and, in the days of alternative comedy, his bawdy humour was deemed sexist and outdated. He ultimately gave up performing in the early 1990s and turned to journalism: for four years he wrote a weekly column for the Yorkshire Post.

== Retirement and death ==
In the 1990s, Thackray withdrew to his home in Monmouth, South Wales, where he had settled with his family in the late 1960s. Beset by health and financial problems: he had become an alcoholic and was declared bankrupt in 2000. He had always been an observant Roman Catholic and became increasingly religious in his later years, limiting his musical activities to performing the Angelus at his local church. He died of heart failure on 24 December 2002, at the age of 64, leaving his widow, Sheila, from whom he was separated, and three sons: Bill, Sam and Tom.

== Revival in interest ==
In May 2002, a group of fans formed the Jake Thackray Project with the intention of making more of Thackray's work available to the public. With Thackray's cooperation, the project team, led by record producer David Harris, received permission from EMI to produce a double CD of 42 songs not on any then-available release, limited to 200 copies, which was released in November 2002 with cover art by Bill Tidy. After Thackray's death the following month, EMI consented to a further edition of 100 copies. This revival of interest led to the release of two mass market CDs the following year: The Very Best of Jake Thackray, and The Jake Thackray Collection, both were released by EMI, with the latter exclusive to HMV. The Jake Thackray Project went on to release a remastered live recording (the CD Live in Germany), and two DVDs: the privately recorded Live at the Unicorn (2009) and the BBC-licensed Jake Thackray and Songs (2014). A musical written by Barnsley-born poet Ian McMillan based on Thackray's songs and their characters, Sister Josephine Kicks the Habit, premiered in 2005 and toured the north of England. A rewrite by Alan Plater was due to tour the UK in 2007, but was put on hold following the death of executive producer Ian Watson. In 2014 Jake Thackray was featured on the BBC Radio Four 'Great Lives' Series.

2006 saw a major retrospective. EMI released an expanded, 29-song double CD edition of Live Performance, and Jake in a Box, a 4-CD box set containing Thackray's four studio albums and six singles in their entirety, plus 25 unused tracks recorded in the Last Will and Testament sessions in 1967, eleven songs recorded for the abandoned album in 1970 and a handful of other rarities. Comedian and writer Victor Lewis-Smith produced a television documentary, Jake on the Box, for the BBC. In 2014, The Jake Thackray Project released a DVD of Jake Thackray and Songs, by arrangement with BBC music, featuring all of Thackray's performances from the television series, along with songs by three of the guest artists, Alex Glasgow, Pete Scott and Ralph McTell. In 2020, attempts to create a one-man show celebrating his life and work — accompanied by excerpts of his performances — formed a subplot in the mockumentary "Meet the Richardsons" in which Jon Richardson expresses his admiration for Thackray's life and works.

== Discography ==
=== Singles ===
- "Remember Bethlehem (The Intake School Carol)" — Columbia/EMI — 1967
- "Lah-Di-Dah" / "The Black Swan" — Columbia/EMI — 1968
- "Tra La La" / "Le Cygne Noir" — Columbia/EMI — 1969
- "Country Boy" (Promo) — Columbia/EMI — 1972
- "On Again! On Again" — EMI — 1977

=== Studio albums ===
- The Last Will and Testament of Jake Thackray — Columbia/EMI — 1967
- Jake's Progress — Columbia/EMI — 1969
- Bantam Cock — Columbia/EMI — 1972
- On Again! On Again! — EMI — 1977

=== Live albums ===
- Live Performance — Columbia/EMI — 1971; reissued 1976; reissued in 2006 as an expanded double CD
- Jake Thackray and Songs — Dingle’s Records — 1981; re-released on streaming platforms in 2022 and on CD in 2023 by The Jake Thackray Project, by arrangement with the BBC.
- Live in Germany — The Jake Thackray Project – 2005
- Live at the Lobster Pot Volume 1 — Lobster Pot — 2005
- Live at the Lobster Pot Volume 2 — Lobster Pot — 2005

=== Compilations ===
- The Very Best of Jake Thackray — EMI — 1975
- Lah-Di-Dah — EMI — 1991
- The Jake Thackray Project — The Jake Thackray Project – 2002 (initially limited to 200 copies, with another 100 released the following year)
- The Very Best of Jake Thackray — EMI — 2003
- The Jake Thackray Collection — EMI (HMV exclusive) — 2003
- Jake in a Box (4-CD Box set) — EMI — 2006

=== DVDs ===
- Live at the Unicorn — The Jake Thackray Project — 2009
- Jake Thackray and Songs — The Jake Thackray Project — 2014, by arrangement with BBC Music
- Sister Josephine Kicks the Habit - The Jake Thackray Musical — 2005
- Jake Thackray at the BBC – A double-DVD set, including all Thackray's other BBC performances. Released by The Jake Thackray Project in December 2022, by arrangement with BBC Music.

=== Books ===
- Jake’s Progress — a book written by Thackray containing the lyrics to most of his songs along with anecdotes and spoken routines from his concerts. Released by Star Books in 1977.
- Beware of the Bull - The Enigmatic Genius of Jake Thackray — a biography written by Paul Thompson and John Watterson, with the cooperation of the Thackray family, and published in hardback by Scratching Shed Publishing in August 2022. The book received excellent reviews and was included by the Daily Telegraph in its pick of the best music books of 2022. The paperback edition, published in February 2023, has a foreword by comedian Jon Richardson, and includes some additional material which only came to light following the book's original publication.
- Jake Thackray - The Unsung Writer — an anthology of Thackray's prose, edited by Paul Thompson, published in August 2025 by Scratching Shed Publishing. The collection covers forty years of writing, from early poetry through to Thackray's journalism. It includes a short story, his first published work, the script for The Golden Ukulele, a music written for his pupils, and more than one hundred of his acclaimed Yorkshire Post and Catholic Herald columns.
