= Upton House, Newham =

Coordinates: 51.5395°N 0.0232°E

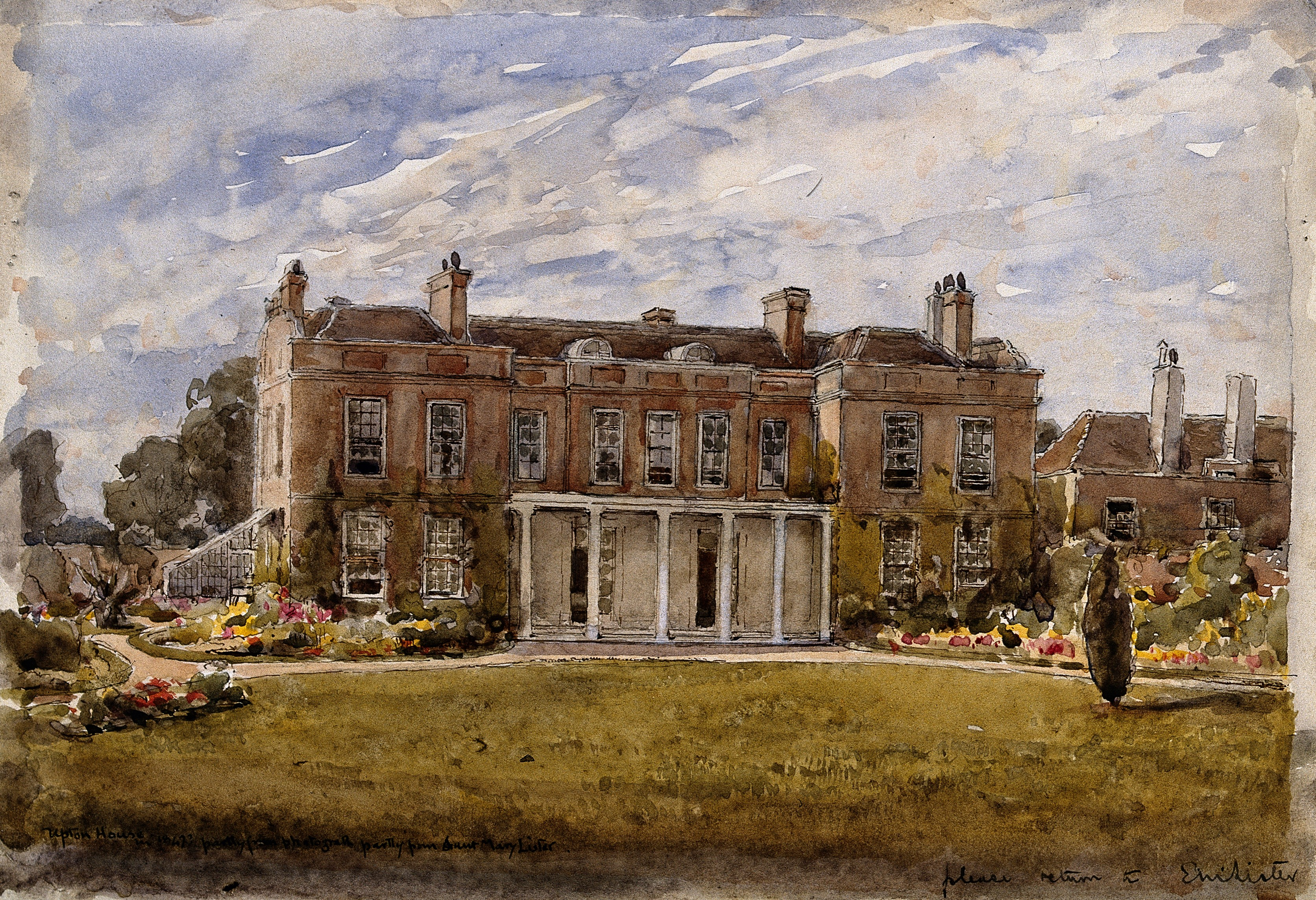
Upton House, West Ham; birthplace of Joseph Lister. Watercolour partly after a photograph, partly after a sketch by Mary Lister, 1920/1940

Upton House was a building in West Ham, Essex (now the London Borough of Newham) on what is now the corner of Lancaster Road and Upton Lane It was rebuilt in 1731. In 1827, it was the birthplace of the surgeon Joseph Lister. In 1893 a temporary church for St Peter's Church, Upton Cross was set up in its gardens, with the house forming the vicarage - the permanent church was later built in the gardens. The vicarage was demolished in 1967-1968 and its site is now occupied by Joseph Lister Court.
