= West Ham Park =

Park in London Borough of Newham, England

Coordinates: 51°32′21″N 0°1′4″E

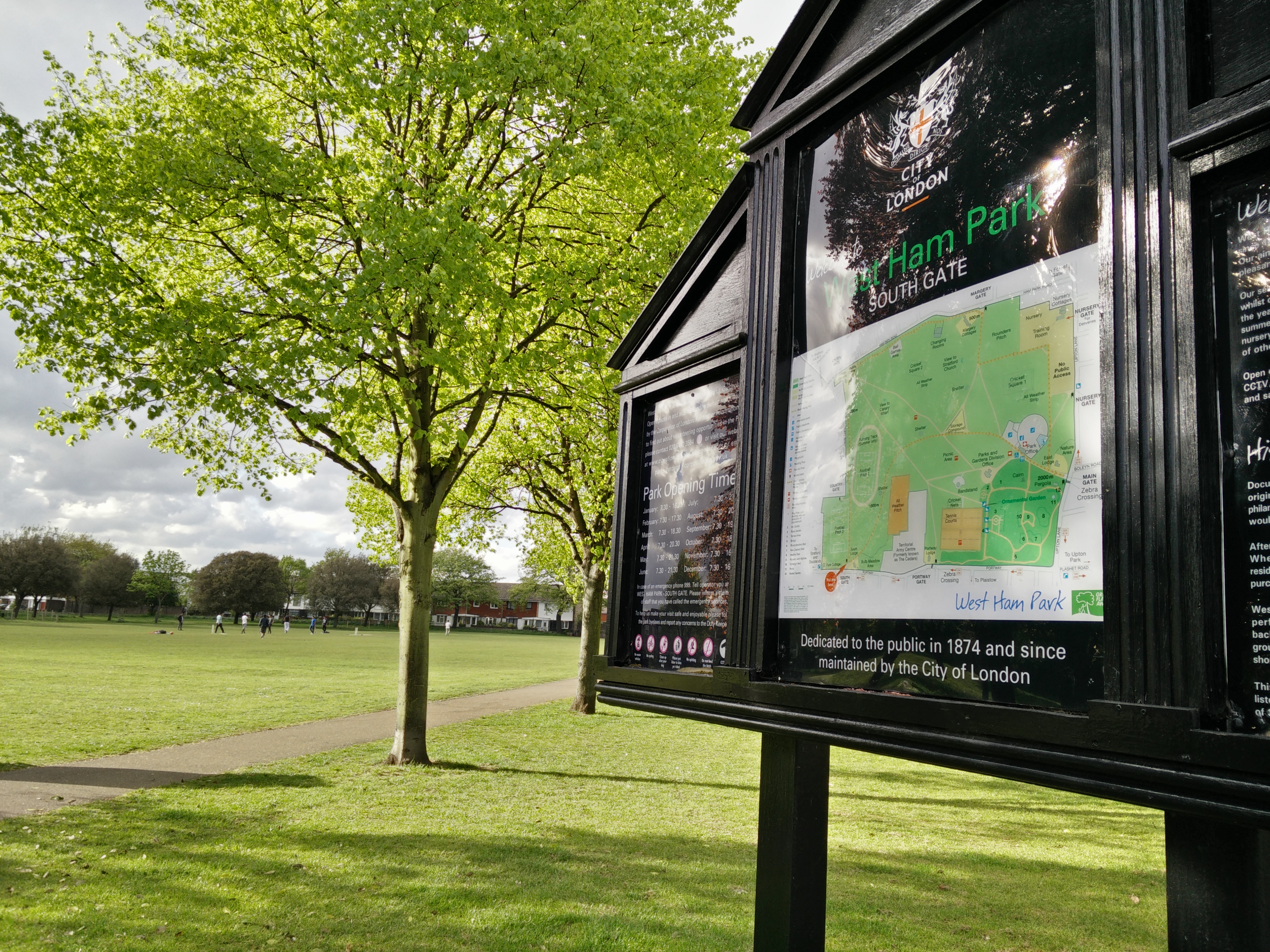
West Ham Park sign

West Ham Park is a privately owned public park in West Ham in the London Borough of Newham. Spanning 77 acres (31 ha), it is the largest park in the borough. The park has been owned and managed by the City of London Corporation since 1874.

Records from 1566 show that the park had been a part of the estate of Upton House, later known as Ham House. William Rooke, who had inherited the estate, enlarged it to 28 acres (11 ha) in 1559. The estate was purchased by John Elliott in 1752, who owned it for 10 years. It was acquired in 1762 by John Fothergill, who enlarged the grounds to around 80 acres (32 ha) and created a sizeable botanical garden, which had been described as 'second only to Kew'. He would often accept rare plants in lieu of his fees as a physician. After Fothergill's death in 1780, the contents of the garden were largely sold off.

The estate was sold to James Sheppard in 1787, and after his death was purchased by Samuel Gurney, his son-in-law, in 1812. During this period, Gurney's sister Elizabeth Fry resided there. It was later passed to John Gurney, who lived in Norfolk and had no use for the estate. Ham House was demolished in 1872. In 1874, John Gurney gave a large contribution towards the purchase of the Ham House estate and grounds by the Corporation of the City of London, to serve as a public open space.

The park was the home to Upton Park FC, a local football club that drew large crowds at home matches. The venue was the site of the first ever FA Cup goal, scored by Jarvis Kenrick for Clapham Rovers in a 3–0 victory over Upton Park on 11 November 1871.

The park has ornamental gardens, children's playgrounds, and sporting facilities including five-a-side football pitches, cricket nets and tennis courts. Until its closure in 2016, a nursery stood at the northeast corner of the park, and was one of the largest operations of its kind in the UK, producing over 200,000 spring and summer bedding plants each year for the park, gardens and churchyards in the City of London and other Corporation open spaces. Plants grown in the nursery were also used for state occasions and banquets hosted by the City of London Corporation.
