= Jake's Progress (album) =

Studio album by Jake Thackray
- Released: 1969
- Recorded: Abbey Road Studios, April 1969
- Genre: Folk
- Label: EMI
- Producer: Norman Newell

Jake Thackray chronology
The Last Will and Testament of Jake Thackray (1967)	Jake's Progress (1969)	Live Performance (1971)

Professional ratings
Review scores
Source	Rating
Allmusic	4/5 stars

Jake's Progress is the second album by Jake Thackray. It was recorded at Abbey Road Studios, produced by Norman Newell, and released on LP by EMI in 1968. The album is currently out of print, but its songs, digitally remastered, are included in the four-CD retrospective Jake in a Box, which also includes alternate versions of eight of the songs – "Left on the Shelf" (in the first person, rather than, as on the album, the third), "The Blacksmith and the Toffee-Maker", "Family Tree", "One-Eyed Isaac", "Grandad", "Salvation Army Girl", "Sophie" and "Nurse" – recorded during the sessions for The Last Will and Testament of Jake Thackray in 1967. "The Blacksmith and the Toffee-Maker" was adapted by Thackray from a story from Laurie Lee's Cider with Rosie.

== Track listing ==
All tracks are written by Jake Thackray.

Side 1
No.	Title	Length
1.	"Country Girl"	3:34
2.	"Family Tree"	3:22
3.	"Sophie"	3:00
4.	"Worried Brown Eyes"	3:43
5.	"On the Shelf"	3:22
6.	"Salvation Army Girl"	2:53
7.	"The Blacksmith and the Toffee-Maker" (based on a story by Laurie Lee)	4:29

Side 2
No.	Title	Length
1.	"The Hole"	3:44
2.	"Caroline Diggeby-Pratte"	3:07
3.	"Grandad"	3:28
4.	"Mrs. Murphy"	2:54
5.	"One-eyed Isaac"	2:30
6.	"Nurse"	2:07
7.	"The Castleford Ladies Magic Circle"	2:27

== Personnel ==
- Jake Thackray - vocals, guitar
- Frank Horrox - piano
- Ike Isaacs - guitar
- Frank Clarke - bass
- Geoff Love - musical supervision
