= St Mary's Church, Plaistow, Newham =

Church of england church

Coordinates: 51°31′54.171″N 0°1′28.834″E

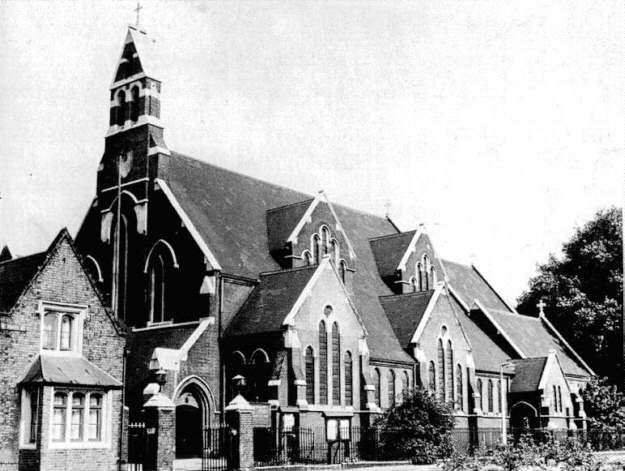
The Victorian building of St Mary's Church, Plaistow

St Mary's Church is a Church of England church in Plaistow in the (East-) London Borough of Newham. With the three churches of St Matthias’, St Martin's, and St Philip and St James’, it formed part of the Parish of the Divine Compassion. Its Victorian building, designed by Sir Arthur William Blomfield in 1890-1894, was demolished in 1976. They now worship in a smaller church built in 1981.

It was built as a chapel of ease to All Saints Church, West Ham, then the only parish church in the area. It was promoted to a parish in its own right in 1844. The site was granted by Sir John H Pelly and the church designed in the neo-Gothic style influenced by the late Perpendicular style by Thomas Curtis. Notable among its vicars was Thomas Given-Wilson, who raised is capacity to 1,000 through a comprehensive rebuild. The parish also built several mission churches - St Peter's, Upton Road (1880s), St Katherine's on Chapman Road (1891; replaced by a permanent church in 1894; demolished 1965), St Thomas' on Northern Road (1898-1950) and St Matthias' Canning Town (1887).

== Sources ==
- A History of the County of Essex: Volume 6. Originally published by Victoria County History, London, 1973; Pages 114-123
- London Church Buildings - Plaistow
