= Le Gorille =

Song by Georges Brassens

from the album La Mauvaise Réputation
- Released: 1952
- Genre: Chanson
- Length: 3:36
- Label: Polydor
- Composer: Eugène Metehen
- Lyricist: Georges Brassens

La Mauvaise Réputation track listing
- 8 tracks A-side: 1. "La Mauvaise Réputation"; 2. "Le Parapluie"; 3. "Le Petit cheval" 4. "Le Fossoyeur"; B-side: 1. "Le Gorille"; 2. "Corne d'aurochs" 3. "La Chasse aux papillons" 4. "Hécatombe"

"Le Gorille" is a 1952 song by Georges Brassens, found on his album La Mauvaise Réputation. It was also released as a single, with La Chasse Aux Papillons as B-side.

== Lyrics ==
The song describes how a group of women in a zoo observe the genitalia of a male gorilla. The animal suddenly escapes and all the women, except for a 100-year old lady, run away. This leads to the refrain of the song: "Gare au gorille!" ("Watch out for the gorilla!"). The gorilla, which is in a rut, mistakes a judge in a black robe for a woman and rapes him. Brassens reveals that this very same judge had sentenced a man to the guillotine earlier that day and now, just like the convicted criminal, screams in vain for mercy.

== Reception ==
Le Gorille was very controversial at the time of its release. First of all because of its pornographic lyrics, but secondly also because it took a stance against the death penalty when it was still in effect in France. It was banned on all French radio stations.

== Covers ==
Le Gorille has been covered and translated several times:

- Fabrizio De André covered it in Italian as Il Gorilla (1968) on his album Volume 3.
- Yossi Banai covered it in Hebrew as הגורילה (Ha-Gorila). Dan Almagor covered it in the same language.
- Jake Thackray covered it in English as Brother Gorilla on his album Bantam Cock (1972).
- Franz Josef Degenhardt covered it in German as Vorsicht Gorilla (1986).
- Le Gorille has been covered by French singer Renaud on his album Renaud chante Brassens (1996).
- Oulahlou covered it as Macahu, changing the gorilla with a donkey, the old lady with a young girl and the judge with a police officer. His song is a critique of the Algerian police force during the Black Spring.
- The Polish cover band Zespół Reprezentacyjny covered it as "Goryl".
- Swedish-Dutch songer Cornelis Vreeswijk covered it as Djävulens sång on his album Visor, svarta och röda (1972).
- Christos Thivaios covered it as Ο Γορίλλας ("The Gorilla").
- Joaquín Carbonell covered it in Spanish as "El Gorila" ("The Gorilla").
- Jiří Dědeček covered it in Czech as "Byj jednou jeden goril" on his album Žalozpěv pro lehký holky.
