= Georges Brassens =

French singer-songwriter and poet (1921–1981)

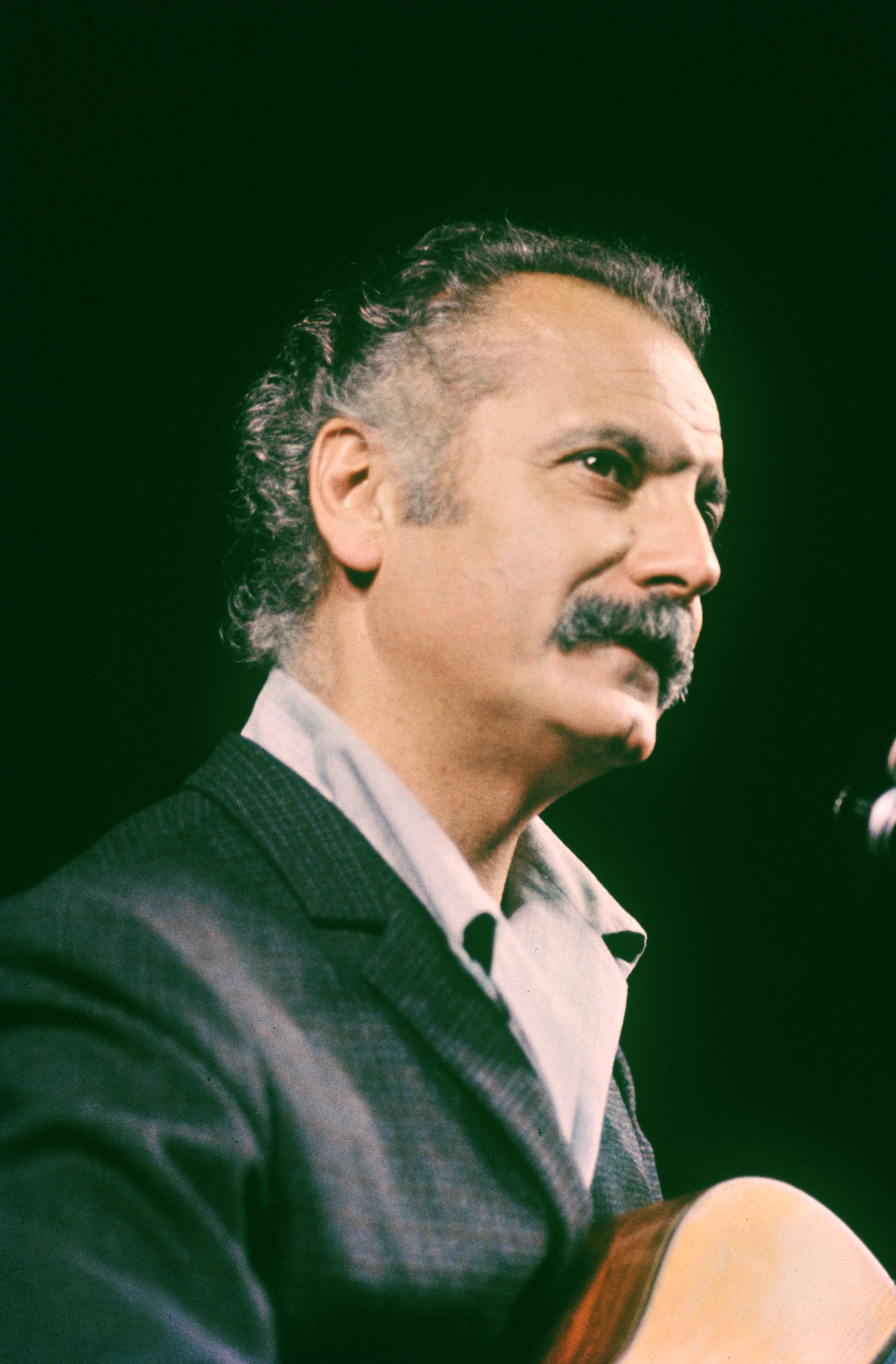
- Georges Brassens in concert at the Théâtre national populaire, September–October 1966

Background information
- Born: Georges Charles Brassens; 22 October 1921; Cette (now Sète), France
- Died: 29 October 1981 (aged 60) Saint-Gély-du-Fesc, France
- Genres: Chanson; folk; acoustic
- Occupation: Singer-songwriter
- Instrument: Acoustic guitar
- Years active: 1951–1981
- Label: Universal Music

Georges Charles Brassens (French: [ʒɔʁʒ(ə) ʃaʁl bʁasɛ̃s]; Occitan: [ˈbɾasens]) was a French singer-songwriter and poet.

Georges Brassens is considered one of France's most accomplished postwar poets. He achieved fame through his elegant songs, characterised by harmonically complex music for voice and guitar, as well as articulate and diverse lyrics. He also set to music poems by both relatively obscure poets and such well-known ones as Louis Aragon (Il n'y a pas d'amour heureux), Victor Hugo (La Légende de la Nonne, Gastibelza), Paul Verlaine, Jean Richepin, François Villon (La Ballade des Dames du Temps Jadis), and Antoine Pol (Les Passantes).

== Early life ==
Brassens was born in Sète, a commune in the department of Hérault in Occitania, to a French father and an Italian mother from the town of Marsico Nuovo, Potenza, southern Italy.

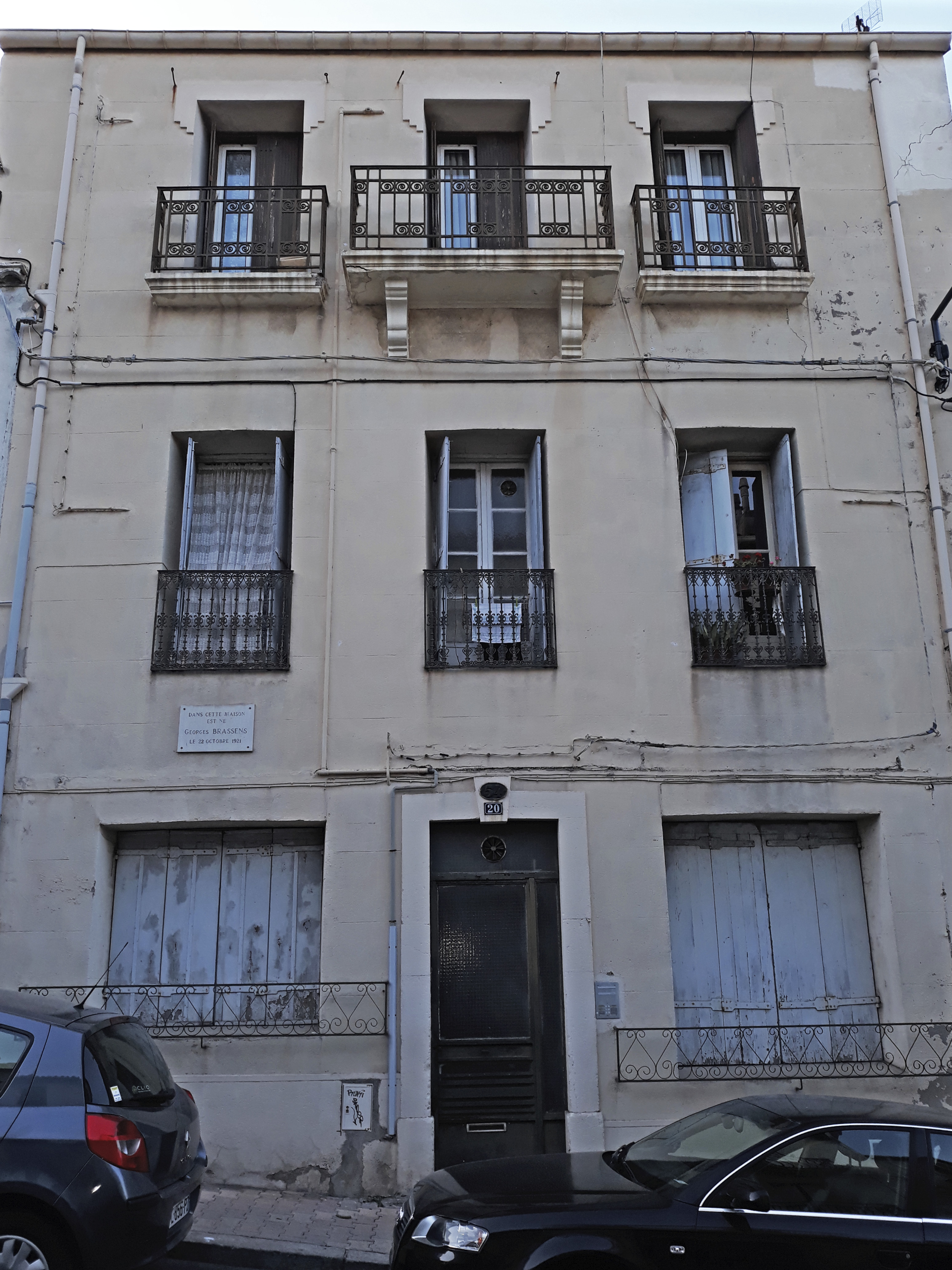
Birthplace of Georges Brassens in Sète

Brassens grew up in the family home in Sète with his mother Elvira Dagrosa, father Jean-Louis, half-sister Simone (daughter of Elvira and her first husband, who was killed in World War I), and paternal grandfather Jules. His mother, whom Brassens labeled "militantly for songs" (militante de la chanson), had a love for music.

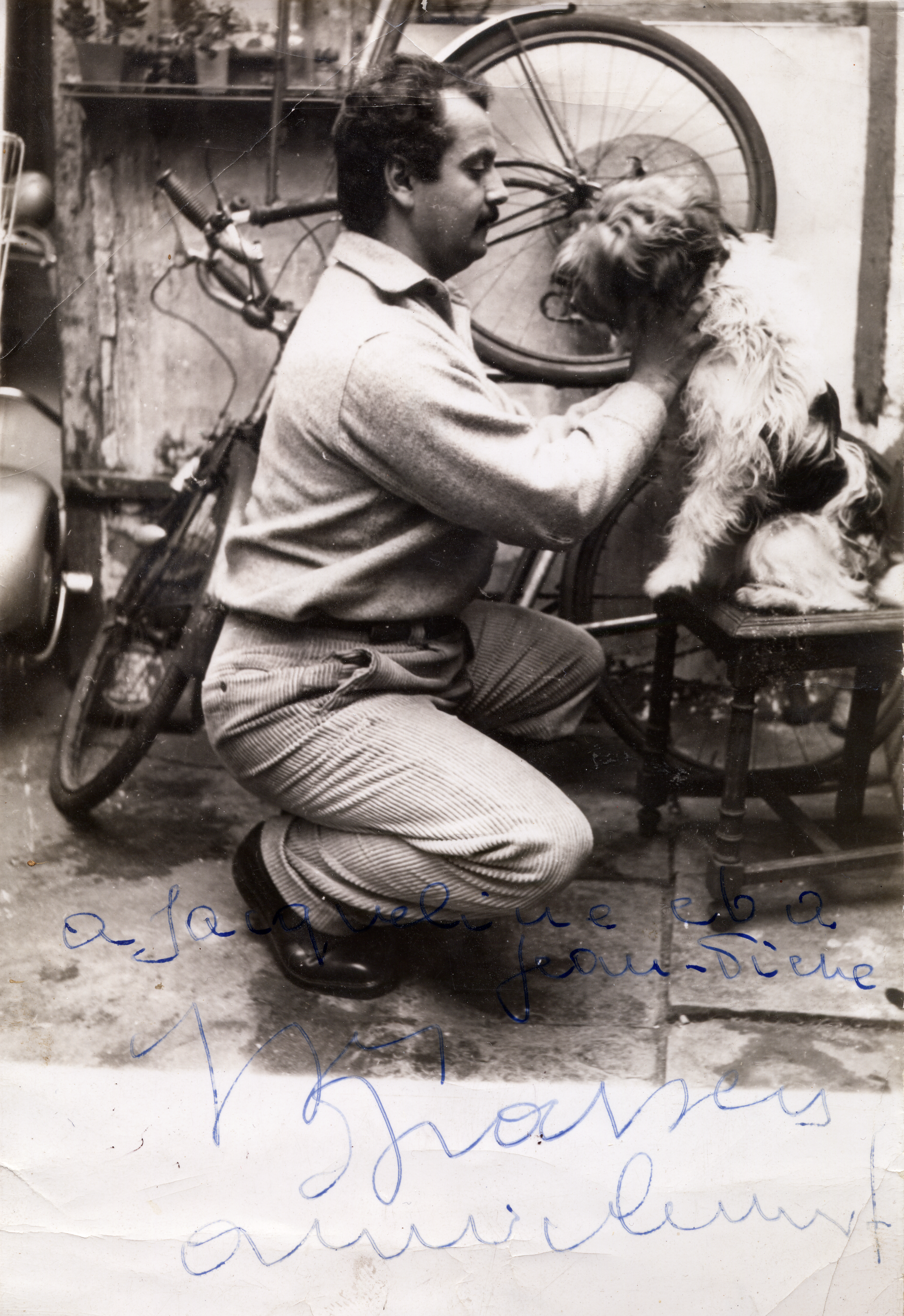
Brassens in 1952

== Career ==
He toured with Pierre Louki, who wrote a book of recollections entitled Avec Brassens (éditions Christian Pirot, 1999, ISBN 2-86808-129-0). After 1952, Brassens rarely left France. A few trips to Belgium and Switzerland; a month in Canada (1961, recording issued on CD in 2011) and another in North Africa were his only trips outside France – except for his concerts in Wales in 1970 and 1973 (Cardiff). His concert at Cardiff's Sherman Theatre in 1973 saw Jake Thackray — a great admirer of his work – open for him.

== Songs ==
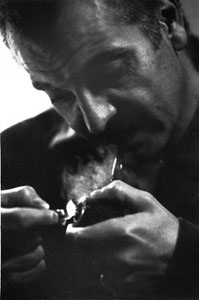
Brassens photographed in 1964 by Erling Mandelmann

Some of his most famous songs include:

- 'La Guerre de '14–'18', a song which satirises claims that World War One was an "ideal war" but condemns it as being "the greatest human slaughterhouse in human history". Later adopted by English comedic duo Flanders and Swann as the basis for their own satire, 'The War of 14–18', which mocks traditional English martial glory.
- "Brave Margot," about a young girl who gives a young kitten the breast, which attracts a large group of male onlookers.
- "La Mauvaise Réputation" – "the bad reputation" – a semi-autobiographical tune with its catchy lyric: "Mais les braves gens n'aiment pas que l'on suive une autre route qu'eux" (But the good folks don't like it if you take a different road than they do.) Pierre Pascal adapted part of the lyrics to Spanish under the title "La mala reputación", which was later interpreted by Paco Ibañez.
- "Pauvre Martin," the suffering of a poor peasant.
- "Le Gorille"
- "Fernande" – a 'virile antiphon' about the women lonely men think about to inspire self-gratification (or to nip it in the bud). Its infamous refrain (Quand je pense à Fernande, je bande, je bande..., 'When I think about Fernande, I get hard') is still immediately recognized in France.

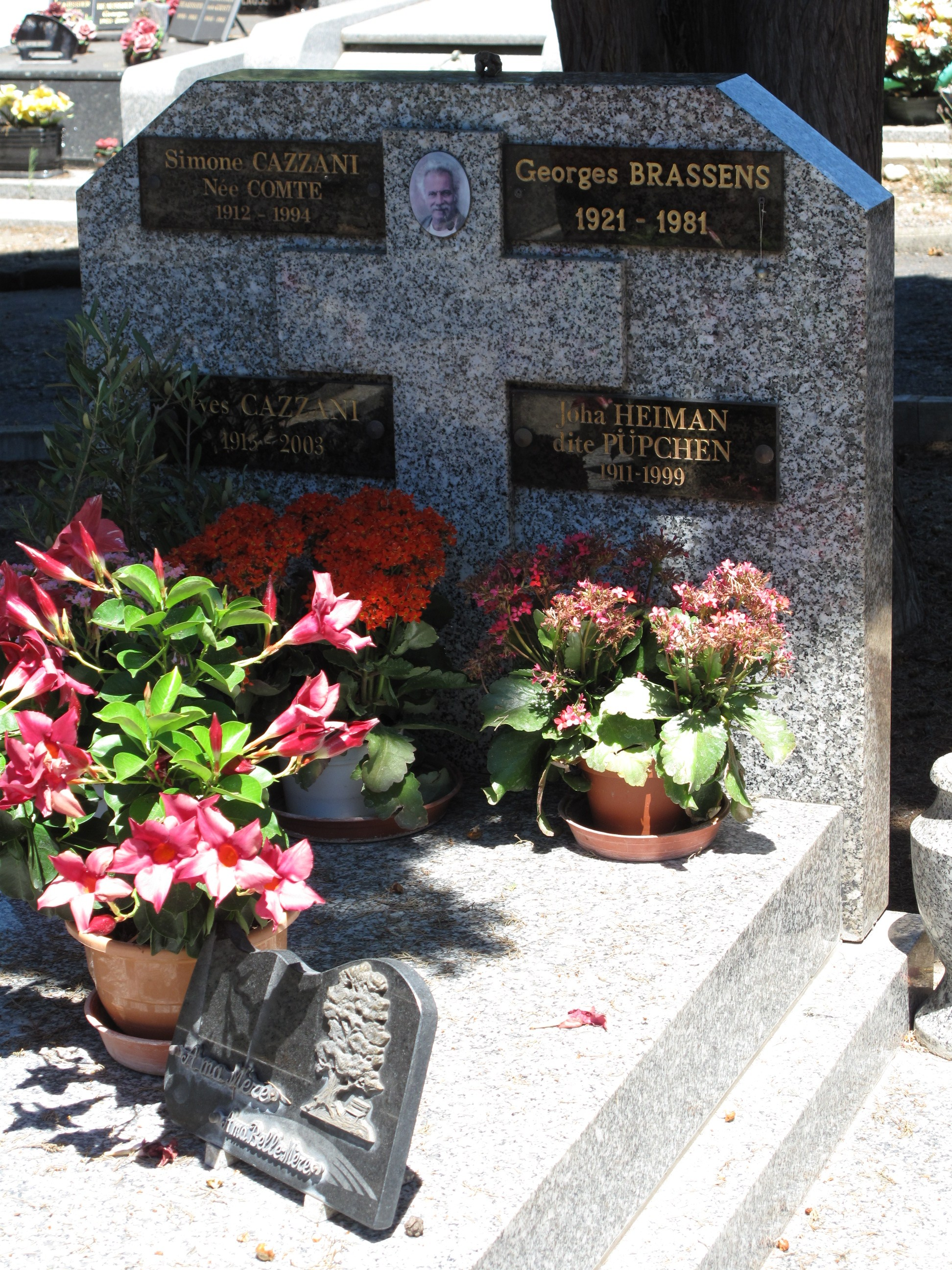
The tomb of Georges Brassens in Cimetière Le Py in Sète

== Legacy ==
In 1984, the Parc Georges-Brassens was opened in Paris. In 2014, Australian-French duo Mountain Men released a live tribute album Mountain Men chante Georges Brassens.

== Discography ==
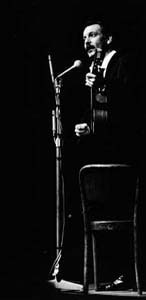
Brassens performing live in 1964

=== Studio albums ===
- 1952: La Mauvaise Réputation
- 1953: Le Vent (or Les Amoureux des bancs publics)
  - including Pauvre Martin
- 1954: Les Sabots d'Hélène (or Chanson pour l'Auvergnat)
- 1956: Je me suis fait tout petit
- 1957: Oncle Archibald
- 1958: Le Pornographe
- 1960: Les Funérailles d'antan (or Le Mécréant)
- 1961: Le Temps ne fait rien à l'affaire
- 1962: Les Trompettes de la renommée
  - including Jeanne
- 1964: Les Copains d'abord
- 1966: Supplique pour être enterré à la plage de Sète
- 1969: Misogynie à part (or La Religieuse)
- 1972: Fernande
- 1976: Trompe la mort (or Nouvelles chansons)
- 1979: Brassens-Moustache jouent Brassens en jazz (with Moustache and les Petits français, jazz versions of previously released songs; re-released in 1987 as Giants of Jazz Play Brassens)
- 1982: Georges Brassens chante les chansons de sa jeunesse (cover album of old songs)

=== Live albums ===
- 1973: Georges Brassens in Great Britain
- 1996: Georges Brassens au TNP (recorded in 1966)
- 2001: Georges Brassens à la Villa d'Este (recorded in 1953)
- 2001: Bobino 64
- 2006: Concerts de 1959 à 1976 (box set featuring concerts from 1960, 1969, 1970, 1973 and 1976)
