= Norman Newell =

English record producer (1919–2004)

Norman Newell OBE
- Also known as: David West
- Born: Norman Newell; 25 January 1919; Plaistow, Essex, England
- Died: 1 December 2004 (aged 85) Angmering, Sussex, England
- Genres: Popular music, musical theatre, traditional pop
- Occupations: Record producer, songwriter, lyricist
- Years active: 1945–2001
- Label: Columbia

Norman Newell (25 January 1919 – 1 December 2004) was an English record producer and lyricist, who was mainly active in the 1950s and 1960s. He was also the co-writer of many notable songs. As an A&R manager for EMI, he worked with musicians such as Shirley Bassey, Dalida, Claude François, Vera Lynn, Russ Conway, Bette Midler, Judy Garland, Petula Clark, Jake Thackray, Malcolm Roberts, Bobby Crush and Peter and Gordon.

Newell was particularly known for his recorded productions of West End musicals. His songs have been covered by Judy Garland, Frank Sinatra, Celine Dion and Aretha Franklin. In 1999, Newell's song, "Portrait of My Love", originally recorded by Matt Monro in 1960, was honoured at the BMI Awards in London for having two million radio plays.

== Early life ==
Newell was born at 34 Liddon Road in Plaistow, Essex (now part of Greater London) to a poor family. He was the son of Sydney Edward Newell, a boiler stoker and later foreman road builder, and his wife, Mary Louisa, née Burke. Sydney had served as a private in the labour corps during the First World War, and suffered from premature blindness, which resulted in Newell's mother having to support the family on a low income.

Newell's early life was marred by illness, with scarlet fever forcing him to miss his eleven-plus examination. He aspired to be an actor, but expected to work for London Transport. Despite doing well in poetry and English at his Plaistow secondary school, he left at the age of 14, and took a job at the offices of the local bus garage in Upton Park.

He joined the Royal Artillery in 1937, and spent much of the Second World War stationed in Yeovil, organising revues and shows for the troops. During the war, he befriended the variety performer Bill Waddington, and wrote lyrics to his music. Following the end of the war, Waddington found Newell a job selling sheet music at the Cinephonic Music Company on Charing Cross Road. He began his career as a songwriter for the London-based publisher.

== Music producer ==
Newell joined EMI's Columbia label as a staff producer in 1949, and was head of the label for its most successful years. During this period, he produced records by Petula Clark, the French male voice choir Les Compagnons de la chanson, Josef Locke, Ronnie Ronalde, The Beverley Sisters, Dorothy Squires and the bandleader Victor Silvester. He also discovered the singer Steve Conway, who recorded Newell's "My Thanks To You" (with music by Noel Gay).

In 1953, Newell moved to the new Philips record label, and produced their first release by a British artist, Johnny Brandon. Newell asked Geoff Love to arrange the song, and this marked the start of their professional relationship, in which Love's albums as Manuel and his Music of the Mountains would be produced by Newell. Following six months working at MGM in America, Newell came back to EMI in 1954, whereupon he recorded the comedians Norman Wisdom and Joyce Grenfell. Although Newell "did not understand" rock 'n' roll, he produced albums of the television shows Drumbeat and 6.5 Special. He used Trevor Stanford as a rehearsal pianist, and began recording with him in 1957, under the name Russ Conway, the surname being a tribute to Steve Conway, who had died in 1952.

Newell went freelance in 1965, and was then put under contract with EMI, where he produced the top selling single of 1965, "Tears", by comedian Ken Dodd.

== Lyricist ==
Newell was a much sought-after lyricist, sometimes writing under the pen-name David West, and responsible for co-writing songs that included "Portrait of My Love" (music by Cyril Ornadel), a UK Singles Chart hit for Matt Monro. In addition, he provided the English lyrics for "More" (the theme from the film Mondo Cane). Newell also wrote the English lyrics of Shirley Bassey's 1961 No. 1 hit "Reach for the Stars", (composed by Nini Oliviero and Riz Ortolani) and Bassey's "This Is My Life" ("La vita", written by Antonio Amurri and Bruno Canfora). Commenting on the latter, Bassey said that "Norman knows more about me than I do."

Further compositions by Newell were "The Importance of Your Love" ("Important C'est La Rose", by Gilbert Bécaud); "Born to Sing" ("Mourir sur scène", by Dalida); "Monday Morning Again" ("Le Lundi au Soleil", by Claude François) and "Never, Never, Never" ("Grande grande grande"), which was a hit for Bassey in 1973. With the composer Philip Green, he co-wrote the United Kingdom's 1963 Eurovision Song Contest entry, "Say Wonderful Things", recorded by Ronnie Carroll. The song was later recorded in the United States by Patti Page.

He wrote the English lyrics to the German song "Sailor", a number one UK hit for Petula Clark and a top ten hit for Anne Shelton in 1961. In 1964, Newell produced Peter and Gordon's number one UK hit "A World Without Love", which also topped the charts in the United States and several other countries. The song "Forget Domani", from the film The Yellow Rolls-Royce (1964), with lyrics by Newell to music by Riz Ortolani, won a Golden Globe Award for Best Original Song.

Newell wrote English-language lyrics to "The White Rose of Athens" for Nana Mouskouri, and Vicky Leandros's 1972 Eurovision Song Contest winning entry, "Après toi" ("Come What May"). "Come What May" reached No. 2 on the UK and Republic of Ireland singles charts in 1972.

In his later years, Newell penned lyrics to Pietro Mascagni's "Intermezzo" from Cavalleria rusticana. The song, entitled "Pray For Love", was recorded by Vince Hill.

Newell was an early influence on lyricist Gary Osborne: the latter knew Newell through family connections.

His numerous contacts in the music publishing industry in the United Kingdom assisted EMI in securing the rights for British recordings of cast albums for many American shows opening in London. Newell also wrote the lyrics for the West End musical Mister Venus (with music by Russ Conway), but the show was not a success. Despite starring Frankie Howerd, the show ran for just 16 performances at the Prince of Wales Theatre in 1958.

== Later career ==
Newell continued working as a producer into the 1980s, including on Shirley Bassey's Gold selling album I Am What I Am, recorded with the London Symphony Orchestra. He also wrote the English lyrics for the 1983 Julio Iglesias recording of "Hey", which featured in the Platinum selling album Julio.

He also produced several cast recordings of West End musicals for First Night Records: Seven Brides For Seven Brothers – Original London Cast (1986), Annie Get Your Gun – 1986 London Cast (starring Suzi Quatro and Eric Flynn), Kiss Me, Kate – 1987 Royal Shakespeare Company Cast (starring Paul Jones, Nichola McAuliffe and Fiona Hendley), and South Pacific – 1988 London Cast (starring Gemma Craven and Emile Belcourt). George Martin said of Newell that he "always wanted to be a Stephen Sondheim," but noted that "his main strength came from his ability to handle big showbiz entertainers." He also continued to write lyrics, notably for the song "Born to Sing" (original song "Mourir Sur Scène", a hit for Dalida in 1983) which was the B-side to Bassey's 1986 single "There's No Place Like London", written and produced by Lynsey de Paul.

Newell retired in 1990. However, he continued to write lyrics, and his final works were with Les Reed.

== Honours ==
During his career, Norman Newell won a Grammy, an Emmy and three Ivor Novello Awards for his contribution to the entertainment industry, as well as six British Music Industry Awards. He was awarded an OBE in 2003.

== Personal life and death ==
Newell, who was gay, lived in Rustington, West Sussex. After a series of debilitating strokes, he was moved to a local nursing home. He died on 1 December 2004, aged 85.
