= Verre =

Verre or Verres may refer to:

- Verre (restaurant), Dubai, United Arab Emirates
- Valerio Verre (born 1994), Italian footballer
- Verres (ca. 120 BC – 43 BC), a Roman magistrate, notorious for his misgovernment of Sicily
- Verrès, town and comune in the Aosta Valley region of north-western Italy
- Verres (beetle), a genus of beetles in family Passalidae

== See also ==
- 53W53, formerly known as Tower Verre, New York City skyscraper
- Orangeside triggerfish, scientific name S. verres
