= Hélène Darroze =

French chef (born 1967)

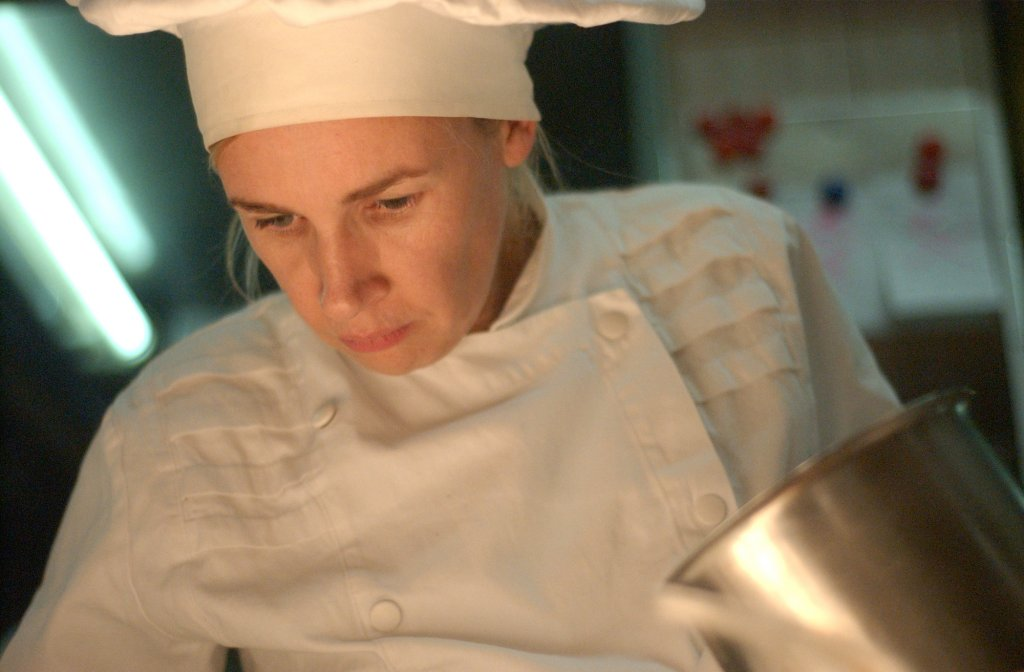
- Darroze in 2007
- Born: 23 February 1967 (age 59); Mont-de-Marsan, France
- Education: BEM Management School
- Culinary career
- Cooking style: French cuisine
- Rating
- Michelin stars
- Current restaurants
- Hélène Darroze at the Connaught; Marsan par Hélène Darroze; Hélène Darroze à Villa La Coste
- Awards
- Legion of Honour (Chevalier)

Hélène Darroze (born 23 February 1967) is a French chef. She has 6 Michelin stars and three restaurants in Europe, Hélène Darroze at The Connaught in London with 3 stars, Marsan par Hélène Darroze in Paris with 2 stars and Hélène Darroze à Villa La Coste in Provence with 1 star.

== Career ==
In 1990, after graduating from university, Darroze began working for Alain Ducasse in the office of the Le Louis XV restaurant in Monaco, where she was convinced to enter the kitchen by Ducasse. It was her first time working anywhere other than her family restaurant and she later said that she was working in the office about half the time. After working for Ducasse for three years, she returned to her family's restaurant and kept its existing Michelin star. After the restaurant suffered financial difficulties and closed in 1999, she opened Restaurant Hélène Darroze in Rue d'Assas, Paris and won her first Michelin star in 2001, picking up a second in 2003. The second star was lost in the 2010 version of the guide.

In 2008, Darroze was named as the new chef at the Connaught in London, replacing Angela Hartnett, who had operated Angela Hartnett at The Connaught there on behalf of Gordon Ramsay Holdings. Darroze took over as part of a £70m refurbishment of the hotel and, in addition to the restaurant, she is also responsible for the hotel's catering services. The restaurant was awarded a Michelin star in 2009, and then a second star in 2011 and a third in 2021.

In 2012 Darroze was admitted into the French Legion of Honour as a Chevalier (Knight) by President Nicolas Sarkozy.

== Personal life ==
Darroze was raised in Mont-de-Marsan. She is a fourth generation chef, the previous three having run a family restaurant in Villeneuve-de-Marsan, France. Before becoming a professional chef, she earned a degree in hospitality management from the KEDGE Business School in 1990.

Darroze has two adopted daughters from Vietnam, Charlotte and Quiterie. She alternates on a weekly basis between staying in London and in Paris, in order to split her time between her restaurants.

== See also ==
- List of female chefs with Michelin stars
