= Ed Balls document leak =

2011 British political controversy

The Ed Balls document leak was a political controversy in the United Kingdom that arose on 9 June 2011. It was based on a database of 55 private documents leaked by The Daily Telegraph that purported to show that Ed Balls played a central role in a plot, launched two months after the 2005 general election dubbed "Project Volvo", to oust Tony Blair as prime minister and replace him with Gordon Brown. The files included private letters between Blair and Brown, and also purported to show that the government went ahead with plans to increase public spending, despite receiving advice to the contrary.

The day following the revelations Cabinet Secretary Sir Gus O'Donnell sanctioned an investigation into the leaking of the papers, after receiving a complaint from Balls, who maintained that the documents referred only to attempts made by him and agreed with by Blair and Brown, "to ensure a 'stable and orderly transition'" between the two Labour politicians.

== Background ==
In May 2009 The Daily Telegraph and The Sunday Telegraph published details of MPs' expenses. This led to a number of high-profile resignations from both the ruling Labour administration and the Conservative opposition. The release of the 66 documents in June 2011 was the second time in recent history that the Telegraph Group had made available to the public documents that could be potentially damaging to political figures.

Balls had been a key figure in New Labour's economic reform agenda. However, he and Brown had differed from the Blairites in being more keen to stress their roots in Labour party intellectual traditions such as Fabianism and the co-operative movement, in addition to taking a modernising approach when it came to policy.

== The files ==
On the evening of 9 July 2011 The Daily Telegraph published the first set of files, consisting of more than 30 documents, which allegedly showed that Balls, and to some extent Ed Miliband and Douglas Alexander, had played a "key role" in undermining Tony Blair in the wake of the 2005 New Labour general election win, "in a plot codenamed Project Volvo". The cache of documents also appeared to reveal in handwritten notes made by Brown his negative feelings towards Blair; material which had previously only been the subject of considerable media speculation.

The following day, 10 July, the newspaper released a further 19 documents "obtained from the personal files of Mr Balls" which purportedly provided evidence that Brown took decisions to press ahead with increased public spending, despite receiving advice that "any increase in taxpayer expenditure should only be in line with inflation". Another memorandum appeared to show that Brown and Balls were warned "that plans to scrap the 10p tax rate would hit millions of poorer Britons and pensioners."

== Denial of allegations ==
Balls maintained both before and after the documents were leaked that he had not been part of a campaign to replace Blair with Brown. In July 2010, Balls dismissed as "total, absolute nonsense" that he had taken part in a coup to oust Blair, and in a BBC interview on 15 June 2010 with Andrew Neil Balls responded to the question "Andrew Rawnsley says the coup was not run by Gordon. It was run by Ed. Is that made up too?" by answering "Complete and utter total balderdash and rubbish".

Subsequent to the documents being published by The Daily Telegraph, Balls again denied any involvement in any role to unseat Blair, calling the allegations ""false and mendacious" and saying "The idea that there was a plot or a coup is untrue and not justified by these papers". Balls claimed that his role at that time was to "hold things together" and that the differences between Blair and Brown amounted to "creative tensions".

== Media reaction ==
In the immediate aftermath of the release, The Guardian stated that the controversy raised questions as to whether O'Donnell's investigation "will raise questions about whether the new government was involved in the leaking of the papers", an insinuation that was lent support by Michael White in the same paper. Toby Young, in The Daily Telegraph, wrote that the leak of the documents had shown that there had been a cover up and suggested that Balls' position as shadow chancellor was untenable. Steve Richards, writing in The Independent, wrote that "the documents are not incriminating. Indeed, the context in which they were written shows why it would be more of a shock if such memos had not been composed as Labour's long internal battle reached a dénouement". The New Statesman wrote "there is no doubt that they are damaging to the shadow chancellor. They contradict his public insistence that he never sought to undermine Blair", and also questioned the timing of the information coming to light.

== See also ==
- Premiership of Tony Blair
- Premiership of Gordon Brown
- Blair–Brown deal
