= Best Home Cook =

British television cooking competition

- Genre: Cooking; Reality
- Presented by: Claudia Winkleman
- Judges: Mary Berry (2018–2021); Chris Bavin (2018–2021); Angela Hartnett (2020–2021); Dan Doherty (2018)
- Composers: Matthew Cracknell; Peter Nickalls
- Country of origin: United Kingdom
- Original language: English
- No. of series: 3
- No. of episodes: 24

Production
- Executive producer: Claire Nosworthy
- Running time: 60 minutes
- Production company: KEO Films

Original release
- Network: BBC One
- Release: 3 May 2018 – 17 February 2021

Best Home Cook (previously Britain's Best Home Cook) is a competitive cooking show produced by KEO Films and distributed internationally by Endemol Shine Group. It premiered on BBC One on 3 May 2018, presented by Claudia Winkleman, with judges Mary Berry, Chris Bavin, and Dan Doherty. A second series, with "Britain's" dropped from the title and Angela Hartnett replacing Doherty, returned in January 2020. The series was created in the wake of Berry's previous show, The Great British Bake Off, departing the BBC for Channel 4, and has received mixed reviews from critics. The programme was axed in 2022.

== Series 1 (2018) ==
=== Cooks ===
Cook	Age	Occupation	Hometown
Cyrus Kay	27	Wine consultant and entrepreneur	York
Dipa Jakhu	44	Civil servant	Wolverhampton
Fiona Hamill	59	Retired shop keeper	County Down, Northern Ireland
Josie Ingram	37	Wealth client executive	Glasgow
Katie Davies	32	Police emergency call handler and dispatcher	Neath, Wales
Philip Friend	48	Maths teacher	Surrey
Pippa Middlehurst	28	Oncology research biobank technician	Salford
Queta "Q" Double	38	Children's A&E nurse	Balcombe, West Sussex
Tobi Akingbolagun	27	Compliance manager	London
Trevor Jones	29	Farmer	Kent

=== Elimination table ===
Contestant	Episode														
Contestant	1		2		3		4		5		6		7		8
Pippa	ULT				ULT						ULT	E	ULT	E	WINNER
Dipa		E		E		E	ULT				ULT	E		E	RUNNERS-UP
Philip				E			ULT			E		E	ULT	E	RUNNERS-UP
Tobi					ULT			E	ULT	E		E		OUT	
Katie			ULT		ULT				ULT			OUT			
Trevor		E		E						OUT					
Cyrus			ULT					OUT							
Josie		E		E		OUT									
Q				OUT											
Fiona		OUT													

(WINNER) This cook won the competition.
(RUNNER-UP) This cook finished in second place.
(ULT) The cook was one of the judges' favourites in the ultimate challenge.
The cook got through to the next round.
(E) The cook was in the elimination round, but not eliminated.
(OUT) The cook was eliminated.

== Series 2 (2020) ==
=== Cooks ===
Cook	Age	Occupation	Hometown
Ayo Salau	28	Accountant	London
Elisabetta Ludica	52	NHS receptionist	London
Georgia May Salamat	24	Model	London
Kate Smith	62	Farmer's wife	Devon
Katie Mahady	33	Supermarket supervisor	Essex
Oli Mannion	34	Restaurant supervisor	Cheshire
Robin Watkinson	63	Maintenance supervisor	Bristol
Sarah Woods	42	Pharmaceutical recruitment partner	Cheshire
Sean Hughes	37	IT project manager	Warwickshire
Suzie Arbuthnot	36	Accountant	Northern Ireland

=== Elimination table ===
Contestant	Episode														
Contestant	1		2		3		4		5		6		7		8
Suzie	ULT		ULT				ULT				ULT			E	WINNER
Georgia	ULT		ULT		ULT			E					ULT	E	RUNNER-UP
Sarah						E			ULT				ULT	E	3RD PLACE
Oli		E						E				E		OUT^{[b]}	
Katie							ULT	E		E^{[a]}		OUT			
Robin				E		E	ULT			E^{[a]}		OUT			
Elisabetta					ULT			OUT							
Ayo	ULT			E	ULT	OUT									
Kate				OUT											
Sean		OUT													

^{[a]} Because the judges were unable to decide on the worst dish during the elimination challenge, no-one was eliminated this week. As a result, two cooks were eliminated the following week.

^{[b]} Oli was not well enough to compete in the Rustle-up challenge and was automatically placed into the elimination challenge.

(WINNER) This cook won the competition.
(RUNNER-UP) This cook finished in second place.
(3RD PLACE) This cook finished in third place.
(ULT) The cook was one of the judges' favourites in the ultimate challenge.
The cook got through to the next round.
(E) The cook was in the elimination round, but not eliminated.
(OUT) The cook was eliminated.

== Celebrity series (2021) ==
=== Celebrities ===
Celebrity	Age	Known for	Hometown
Desiree Burch	42	Comedian & television presenter	California, United States
Ed Balls	53	Retired Labour politician	Norfolk, England
Ed Byrne	48	Comedian & actor	Dublin, Ireland
Ferne McCann	30	Former The Only Way Is Essex star	Essex, England
Gareth Thomas	46	Former Wales rugby player	Bridgend, Wales
Karim Zeroual	27	Television presenter & actor	London, England
Rachel Johnson	55	Journalist & author	London, England
Ruth Madeley	33	Actress	Westhoughton, England
Shobna Gulati	54	Actress	Oldham, England
Tom Read Wilson	34	Receptionist on Celebs Go Dating	London, England

=== Elimination table ===
Contestant	Episode														
Contestant	1		2		3		4		5		6		7		8
Ed Balls			ULT		ULT		ULT	E^{[a]}		E	ULT		ULT	E	WINNER
Tom						E				E		E	ULT		RUNNER-UP
Rachel					ULT			E^{[a]}	ULT			E		E	3RD PLACE
Ferne	ULT					E	ULT		ULT	E			ULT	OUT	
Shobna	ULT						ULT		ULT	E		OUT			
Ed Byrne			ULT					E^{[a]}		OUT					
Karim		E		E		E				OUT					
Ruth		E		E		OUT									
Gareth	ULT			OUT											
Desiree		OUT													

^{[a]} Because the judges were unable to decide on the worst dish during the elimination challenge, no-one was eliminated this week.

(WINNER) This cook won the competition.
(RUNNER-UP) This cook finished in second place.
(3RD PLACE) This cook finished in third place.
(ULT) The cook was one of the judges' favourites in the ultimate challenge.
The cook got through to the next round.
(E) The cook was in the elimination round, but not eliminated.
(OUT) The cook was eliminated.
