= Open House with Gloria Hunniford =

- Genre: Lifestyle
- Presented by: Gloria Hunniford
- Country of origin: United Kingdom
- Original language: English
- No. of series: 6
- No. of episodes: 900

Production
- Running time: 60 minutes (including adverts)
- Production company: Thames Television

Original release
- Network: Channel 5
- Release: 27 April 1998 – 14 November 2003

Open House with Gloria Hunniford was an afternoon television show, produced by Thames Television and broadcast on Channel 5 in the United Kingdom between 27 April 1998 and 20 December 2002. It was presented by Gloria Hunniford and focused on lifestyle, cookery, and human interest issues. It was broadcast five days a week from Monday to Friday.

The programme was one of Channel 5's earliest shows, attracting relatively strong ratings for Channel 5, with a regular audience of 900,000. However, despite its favourable ratings, it was announced in September 2002 that the daily show would be axed as part of a revamp of the channel's daytime schedule. Hunniford continued to present occasional celebrity specials until November 2003.
