= Chris Bavin =

English television presenter (born 1980)

- Born: Christopher Bavin; 1 February 1980 (age 46); Surrey, England
- Occupations: Television presenter, fresh produce importer
- Years active: 2013–present
- Employer: BBC
- Known for: Eat Well for Less? Best Home Cook; Britain in Bloom; Food: Truth or Scare; Tomorrow's Food; Wanted: A Simple Life
- Spouse: Millie Bavin
- Children: 3

Christopher Bavin (born 1 February 1980) is a television presenter and fresh produce importer, known for co-presenting Britain's Best Home Cook, Eat Well for Less?, Britain in Bloom, Food: Truth or Scare, and is one of the presenters on Tomorrow's Food, and a multitude of consumer affairs programmes, all shown on BBC One.

== Career ==
Bavin's background is in the fresh produce industry, importing and selling to the wholesale markets across the UK. Bavin has been working in the fresh produce industry for 18 years.

In 2009, Bavin and his wife opened their own high street store 'The Naked Grocer' in Walton on Thames, Surrey. They ran the business both from the store and from a farm for seven years and in that time won the title of 'National Independent Retailer of the Year' twice, along with Elmbridge's 'Outstanding Contribution to the Community Award' in 2013.

Bavin became involved with the BBC when he was called by a researcher from RDF Television, this eventually led to him co-presenting Eat Well For Less?. Alongside his presenting career, Bavin also imports fruit and vegetables for company Pacific Produce, he is a key note speaker and also works as a retail consultant.

=== Television ===
Since 2013, Bavin has co-presented Eat Well for Less? alongside Gregg Wallace. It is a factual BBC One show that helps families across the UK to reduce their shopping budgets without compromising on quality. Eight series have been aired, with the latest being shown in summer 2022.

In February 2016, Bavin co-presented Food: Truth or Scare with Gloria Hunniford. The programme returned for a second series in February 2017. It was a health-medical BBC One documentary in which they examined the facts behind headlines and offer advice about which foods are healthy or harmful.

From January to March 2016, Bavin presented Tomorrow’s Food alongside Dara Ó Briain, Angela Hartnett and Dr Shini Somara. The BBC One show looks at the cutting-edge technologies and produce appearing in farms, supermarkets, kitchens and restaurants around the world, and how this is transforming the way we grow, buy and eat our food.

In February 2016, Bavin appeared as a guest panelist on the Channel 5 programme The Wright Stuff.

In September 2016, Bavin presented an episode of The Truth About. This BBC One science documentary series tackled everyday issues that affect us all. Each episode featured different presenters and experts in their fields. Bavin presented the episode titled The Truth About Meat, in which he set out to understand whether certain claims about meat, linking it to cancer and heart disease, are justified.

He is a judge on BBC's Britain's Best Home Cook alongside Mary Berry and Dan Doherty. The series aired in 2018, and returned for a second series in 2020 with Bavin judging alongside Berry and Angela Hartnett.

Bavin is the presenter of BBC One's Wanted: A Simple Life; series one started in February 2021. The series is made by the production team behind Wanted Down Under.

In October 2022 Bavin alongside Anita Rani and Julie Ashfield presented Channel 4's 'Aldi's Next Big Thing'.

== Personal life ==
Bavin married Millie Bavin in 2011. They have three children.

Before the couple opened "The Naked Grocer", Millie worked as a buyer in fashion retail and also as a costume designer for film and TV.
