= Ed Balls =

British broadcaster and politician (born 1967)

The Right Honourable Ed Balls
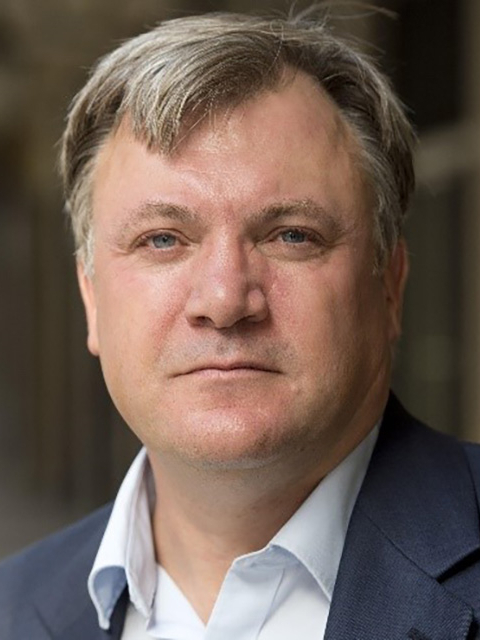
- Official portrait, 2021

Secretary of State for Children, Schools and Families
- In office 28 June 2007 – 11 May 2010
- Prime Minister: Gordon Brown
- Preceded by: Alan Johnson (Note: as Secretary of State for Education and Skills)
- Succeeded by: Michael Gove (Note: as Secretary of State for Education)

Economic Secretary to the Treasury
- In office 6 May 2006 – 28 June 2007
- Prime Minister: Sir Tony Blair
- Preceded by: Ivan Lewis
- Succeeded by: Kitty Ussher

Member of Parliament for Morley and Outwood Normanton (2005–2010)
- In office 5 May 2005 – 30 March 2015
- Preceded by: Bill O'Brien
- Succeeded by: Andrea Jenkyns

Shadow Cabinet portfolios
- 2010: Education
- 2010–2011: Home Department
- 2011–2015: Chancellor of the Exchequer

Personal details
- Born: Edward Michael Balls; 25 February 1967 (age 59) Norwich, Norfolk, England
- Party: Labour Co-op
- Spouse: Yvette Cooper (m. 1998)
- Children: 3
- Parents: Michael Balls; Carolyn Riseborough
- Education: Keble College, Oxford (BA); Harvard University (MPA)
- Website: www.edballs.co.uk
- Ed Balls's voice Balls speaks at the opening of Bristol Brunel Academy; Recorded 6 September 2007

Edward Michael Balls (born 25 February 1967) is a British broadcaster, economist and former politician. He served as a junior minister in the treasury portfolio from 2006 to 2007, as Secretary of State for Children, Schools and Families from 2007 to 2010, and as Shadow Chancellor of the Exchequer from 2011 to 2015. A member of Labour Co-op, he was the Member of Parliament (MP) for Normanton and later for Morley and Outwood between 2005 and 2015.

Balls attended Nottingham High School before he studied philosophy, politics and economics at Keble College, Oxford, and was later a Kennedy Scholar in economics at the John F. Kennedy School of Government, Harvard University. He was a teaching fellow at Harvard from 1988 to 1990, when he joined the Financial Times as the lead economic writer. Balls had joined the Labour Party while attending Nottingham High School, and became an adviser to Shadow Chancellor Gordon Brown in 1994, continuing in this role after Labour won the 1997 general election, and eventually becoming the Chief Economic Adviser to the Treasury.

At the 2005 general election, Balls was elected as the MP for Normanton (which in 2010 became Morley and Outwood), and in 2006 became Economic Secretary to the Treasury. When Brown became Prime Minister in 2007, Balls became Secretary of State for Children, Schools and Families, serving until the 2010 general election, in which Labour was defeated after 13 years in government. Balls retained his seat, however, and was appointed Shadow Secretary of State for Education under (temporary) Leader of the Opposition Harriet Harman. In the 2010 Labour leadership election, which had been triggered by Brown's resignation as Leader of the Labour Party, Balls ran as a candidate but placed third. He was then appointed, by new Labour leader Ed Miliband, as Shadow Home Secretary. He served in this role until 2011, when he was appointed Shadow Chancellor of the Exchequer, a role that he held until he was unseated at the 2015 general election.

Following his electoral defeat, he became a senior fellow at Harvard University Kennedy School's Mossavar-Rahmani Center for Business and Government, and a visiting professor to the Policy Institute at King's College London. He was appointed chairman of Norwich City F.C. in December 2015, a position he held until December 2018. In 2020, he was appointed Professor of Political Economy at King's College London. Balls was a contestant on series 14 of the BBC's Strictly Come Dancing, surviving until week 10, and in 2021 was the winner in the BBC's Celebrity Best Home Cook. He is currently a presenter for the ITV breakfast show Good Morning Britain as well as a host of the politics podcast Political Currency with George Osborne.

== Early life ==
Balls' father is zoologist Michael Balls; his mother is Carolyn Janet Riseborough. His younger brother is Andrew Balls, the CIO for Global Fixed Income at the investment firm PIMCO. His grandfather was a lorry driver who died of cancer when Balls was young. His father, in Norfolk, was active in the local Labour party, delivering leaflets, and was chairman of the Campaign for the Advancement of Norfolk Education – CANE.

Balls was born at Norfolk and Norwich Hospital in Norwich. He spent his early years in Bawburgh, Norfolk before moving to Keyworth, Nottinghamshire at the age of eight, where he attended Crossdale Drive Primary School and the private all-boys Nottingham High School.

He was in the school choir, and played violin in the orchestra, where the head of music was Kendrick Partington, the organist of St Peter's Church, Nottingham.

When Prince Philip visited the school in 1984 to open a new science block, Balls, as a Venture scout in the sixth form, met the Prince wearing outdoor walking clothing. Ed Davey, as head boy, met the Prince too, as one of three brothers who had gained the Duke of Edinburgh gold award.

He was a house captain, and gained A-levels in English, History, and Economics in 1985.

Raised as an Anglican he read Philosophy, politics and economics at Keble College, Oxford, graduating with a First – according to John Rentoul in The Independent – ahead of David Cameron. Later he attended the John F. Kennedy School of Government at Harvard, where he was a Kennedy Scholar specialising in Economics.

Balls joined the Labour Party in 1983 while still at school. While at Oxford University he was a partially active member of the Labour Club, but also signed up to the Liberal Club as well as the Conservative Association, "because they used to book top-flight political speakers, and only members were allowed to attend their lectures" according to friends. Balls was a founding member of The Steamers, an all-male drinking club, and suffered embarrassment when a contemporary photo of him wearing Nazi uniform appeared in the papers.

=== Early career ===
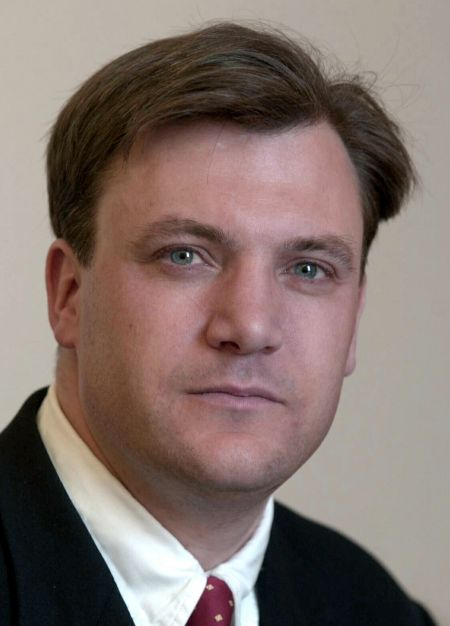
Official portrait, 2002

Between 1988 and 1990, Balls was a Teaching Fellow at Harvard University. He joined the Financial Times in 1990 as a lead economic writer until his appointment as an economic adviser to Shadow Chancellor Gordon Brown in 1994. When Labour regained power at the 1997 general election, Brown became Chancellor and Balls continued to work as his economic adviser, eventually becoming Chief Economic Adviser to the Treasury.

== Political career ==
In July 2004, Balls was selected to stand as Labour and Co-operative candidate for the parliamentary seat of Normanton in West Yorkshire, a Labour stronghold whose MP, Sir Bill O'Brien, was retiring. He stepped down as Chief Economic Adviser to HM Treasury, but was given a position at the Smith Institute, a political think tank. HM Treasury and the Cabinet Office subsequently stated that "the normal and proper procedures were followed".

=== Member of Parliament ===
In the 2005 general election, he was elected MP for Normanton with a majority of 10,002 and 51.2% of the vote. After the Boundary Commission proposed changes which would abolish his constituency, Balls ran a campaign, in connection with the local newspaper the Wakefield Express, to save the seat and, together with the three other Wakefield MPs (his wife Yvette Cooper, Mary Creagh and Jon Trickett), fought an unsuccessful High Court legal action against the Boundary Commission's proposals.

In March 2007, he was selected to be the Labour Party candidate for the new Morley and Outwood constituency; unlike the previous safe Labour seat of Normanton, it was a marginal, which contained parts of the abolished Normanton and Morley and Rothwell constituencies, and was elected for the new seat in May 2010. On 5 February 2013, Balls voted in favour in the House of Commons Second Reading vote on marriage equality in Britain. Balls was a member of the Labour Friends of Israel.

=== Allegations over allowances ===
In September 2007, with his wife Yvette Cooper, he was accused by Liberal Democrat MP Norman Baker of "breaking the spirit of Commons rules" by using MPs' allowances to help pay for a £655,000 home in north London. Balls and Cooper bought a four-bedroom house in Stoke Newington, and registered this as their second home (rather than their home in Castleford, West Yorkshire) to qualify for up to £44,000 a year to subsidise a reported £438,000 mortgage under the Commons Additional Costs Allowance, of which they claimed £24,400. Both worked in London full-time and their children attended local London schools. Balls and Cooper claimed that "The whole family travel between their Yorkshire home and London each week when Parliament is sitting. As they are all in London during the week, their children have always attended the nearest school to their London house."

Balls and Cooper "flipped" the designation of their second home three times within the space of two years. In June 2008, they were referred to the Parliamentary Commissioner for Standards over allegations that they were claiming expenses for what was effectively their main home in London. Their combined claim was £24,000 i.e. "slightly more" than the single MP allowance. The commissioner exonerated them, adding that their motives were not for profit as they paid full capital gains tax.

=== Cabinet ===
Balls became Economic Secretary to the Treasury, a junior ministerial position at HM Treasury, in the Cabinet reshuffle of May 2006. While Economic Secretary, he was commissioned, alongside Jon Cunliffe, by the G7 finance ministers to prepare a report on economic aspects of the Israeli–Palestinian conflict.

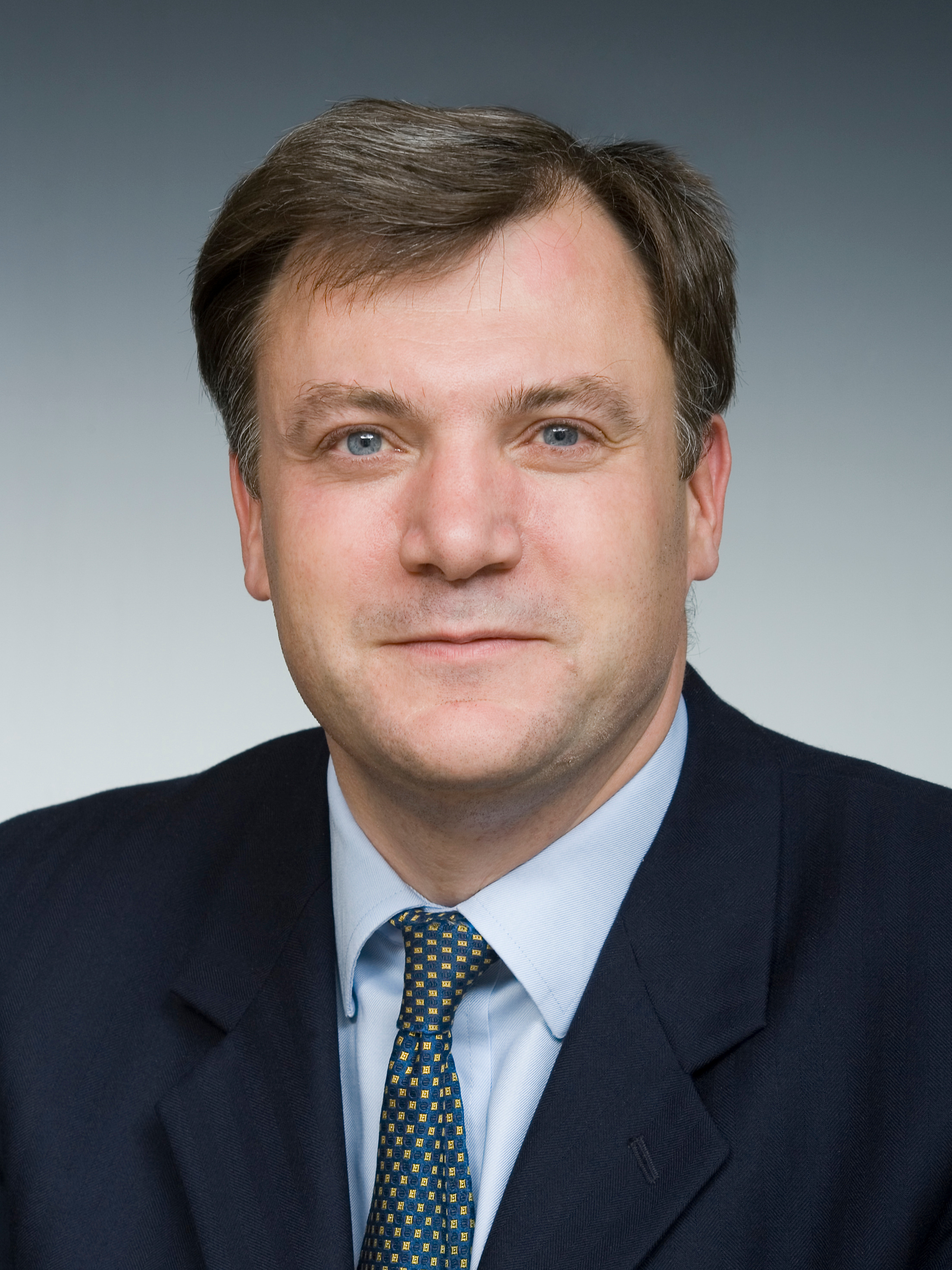
Official portrait, 2007

When Gordon Brown became Prime Minister on 27 June 2007, Balls was promoted to Secretary of State for Children, Schools and Families. At the Department for Children, Schools and Families, Balls brought together schools and children's policy for the first time in the Children's Plan and raised the UK education and training leaving age to 18. In 2007 Balls was considered to be given the post of Chancellor, but the role was given to Alistair Darling.

In October 2008, Balls announced that the government had decided to scrap SAT tests for 14-year-olds, a move which was broadly welcomed by teachers, parent groups and opposition MPs. The decision to continue with SAT tests for 11-year-olds was described by head teachers' leader Mick Brookes as a missed opportunity.

In December 2008, following the case of the Death of Baby P, Balls intervened directly in the running of Haringey Social Services, ordering the immediate dismissal, without compensation, of Sharon Shoesmith the director of children's services. David Cameron had also called for her dismissal.

Prior to her dismissal, Shoesmith had been widely praised in her former role as Director of Education, though she was handicapped by having no social work background. An emergency OFSTED report ordered by Balls in November 2008 following the child abuse trial found that safeguarding arrangements were inadequate although Shoesmith's lawyers alleged that the final report had been altered. Shoesmith subsequently brought a Judicial review against Balls, Ofsted and Haringey Council and a series of appeals followed.

The Conservative Opposition supported Balls' right to dismiss her "because ministers want to uphold the principle that they – and not the courts, through judicial review – should be responsible for their decisions". She received compensation as her sacking was deemed "procedurally unfair" and the Department for Children, Schools and Families was subsequently refused leave to appeal to the Supreme Court.

In October 2013, it was reported that Shoesmith had agreed to an out-of-court settlement with Haringey Council; unconfirmed reports referred to a sum of 'up to £600,000'. Appeal Court judge Lord Neuberger had described Balls' dismissal of Shoesmith as 'unlawful', but in a statement issued on 29 October, Balls asserted that 'faced with the same situation [he] would do the same thing again.'

Balls sponsored the Children, Schools and Families Bill, which had its first reading on 19 November 2009. Part of the proposed legislation was to see regulation of parents who home educate their children in England, introduced in response to the Badman Review, with annual inspections to determine quality of education and welfare of the child. Home educators across the UK petitioned their MPs to remove the proposed legislation.

Several parts of the bill, including the proposed register for home educators, and compulsory sex education lessons, were abandoned as they had failed to gain cross party support prior to the pending May 2010 election.

=== 2010 Labour leadership election ===
Following the resignation of Gordon Brown as both prime minister and leader of the Labour Party, Balls announced on 19 May 2010 that he was standing in the election to replace Brown. Balls was the third candidate to secure the minimum of 33 nominations from members of the Parliamentary Labour Party in order to enter the leadership race. The other contenders were former Foreign Secretary David Miliband, former Health Secretary Andy Burnham, backbencher Diane Abbott and former Energy Secretary Ed Miliband, who was elected.

=== Shadow Cabinet ===
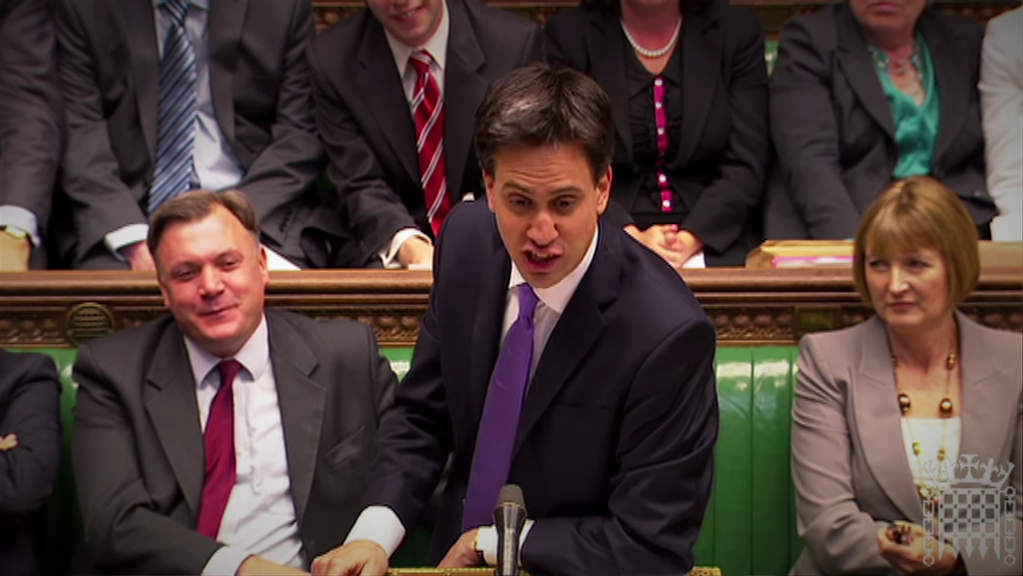
Ed Miliband at PMQs in 2012, flanked by Balls (left) and Harriet Harman (right)

Miliband appointed Balls Shadow Home Secretary on 8 October 2010, a job he held until 20 January 2011, when the resignation of Alan Johnson for "personal reasons" led to a reshuffle and Balls was appointed as Labour's Shadow Chancellor of the Exchequer.

As Shadow Chancellor, Balls regularly appeared with Miliband at joint press conferences relating to Labour policy. Together with Miliband, Balls promoted a "five-point plan for jobs and growth". The plan was described as aimed at helping the UK economy, and would have involved reinstating the bonus tax to fund building more social homes, bringing forward long-term investment, cutting VAT to 17.5%, cutting VAT on home improvements to 5% for one year, and instigating a one-year National Insurance break.

Balls declared in January 2012 that he would continue with the public sector pay freeze which led to opposition from Len McCluskey. He had a bruising exchange in the House of Commons with George Osborne regarding the Libor rate scandal, where Osborne accused Balls of being involved in the scandal. Conservative MPs became unhappy after Bank of England deputy governor, Paul Tucker denied encouragement to pressurise Barclays with Andrea Leadsom saying Osborne had made a mistake and should apologise.

=== 2015 general election ===
In the 2015 general election Balls lost his seat to the Conservative Party's Andrea Jenkyns by a margin of 0.9%. It was claimed that the Labour leader's office had known for two weeks that Balls was likely to lose. Larry Elliott of The Guardian described this as the Portillo moment of the election. On 11 May, it was reported that, on leaving the Commons, Balls would receive up to £88,000 in expenses for relocation and to close down his parliamentary office.

=== Ed Balls Day ===
Ed Balls
(@edballs)
tweeted:

Ed Balls

28 April 2011

On 28 April 2011, Balls, urged by an assistant to search Twitter for a recent article about himself, accidentally entered his intended search term in the wrong box and sent a tweet reading only "Ed Balls". The tweet was retweeted by thousands; Balls was unaware that it was possible to delete tweets. The tweet has never been deleted. The incident is now celebrated as "Ed Balls Day" every 28 April, with followers retweeting his original message and commemorating the occasion in other ways. When invited to send something to be auctioned to raise funds for the party in 2015, Balls submitted a framed, signed printout of the tweet. To celebrate "Ed Balls Day" in 2016, Balls baked a cake featuring the tweet.

Six years on from the original tweet, Ed Balls Day 2017 drew tweets from organisations including Virgin Atlantic and the National Trust – the latter in response to a tweet parodying Prime Minister Theresa May's criticism of the National Trust for omitting the word "Easter" from promotional material for Easter egg hunts.

Ten years after the incident, Ed Balls Day was still being celebrated, with many offering each other a "Happy Ed Balls Day" online, in the style of a public holiday.

On 17 November 2024, Balls made "Ed Balls" the first post on his Bluesky account.

== Political activities ==
Balls has played a prominent role in the Fabian Society. In 1992, he wrote a Fabian pamphlet advocating Bank of England independence, a policy adopted when Gordon Brown became Chancellor in 1997. Balls was elected Vice-Chair of the Fabian Society for 2006 and Chair of the Fabian Society for 2007. As Vice-Chair of the Fabian Society, he launched the Fabian Life Chances Commission report in April 2006 and opened the society's Next Decade lecture series in November 2006, arguing for closer European cooperation on the environment.

Balls has been a central figure in New Labour's economic reform agenda. He and Brown have differed from the Blairites in being keen to stress their roots in Labour Party intellectual traditions such as Fabianism and the co-operative movement, as well as their modernising credentials in policy and electoral terms. In a New Statesman interview in March 2006, Martin Bright writes that Balls "says the use of the term 'socialist' is less of a problem for his generation than it has been for older politicians like Blair and Brown, who remain bruised by the ideological warfare of the 1970s and 1980s". In the interview, Balls said:

When I was at college, the economic system in eastern Europe was crumbling. We didn't have to ask the question of whether we should adopt a globally integrated, market-based model. For me, it is now a question of what values you have. Socialism, as represented by the Labour Party, the Fabian Society, the Co-operative movement, is a tradition I can be proud of.

Balls attended the 2006, 2014, and 2015 Bilderberg meetings. Balls was a member of the Labour Friends of Israel.

== Later career ==
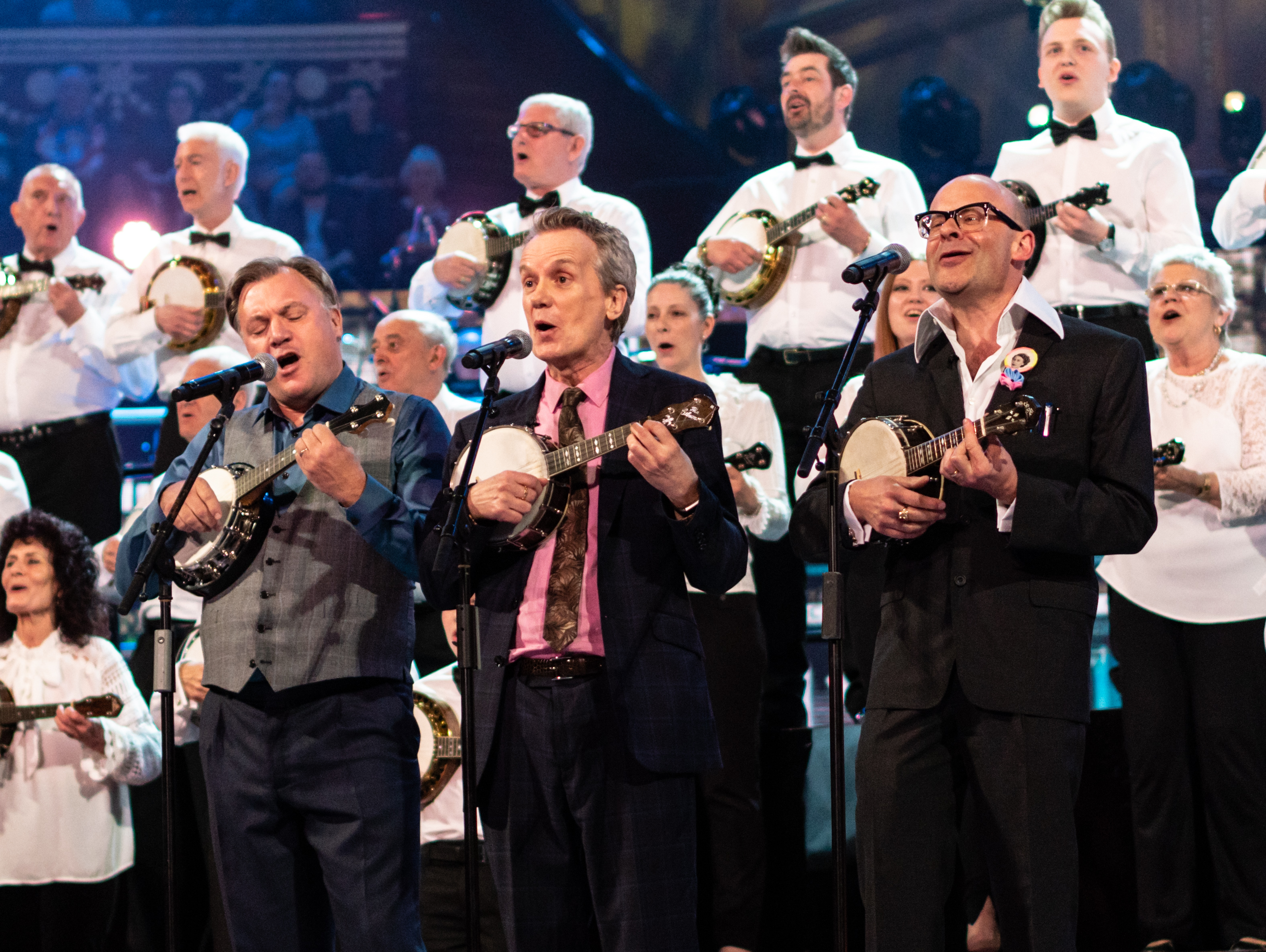
Balls (left) performs at The Queen's Birthday Party with Frank Skinner (centre) and Harry Hill (right).

After leaving politics, Balls was appointed Senior Fellow at the John F. Kennedy School of Government, and also became visiting professor of King's College, London. He was appointed as the chairman of Norwich City F.C. in December 2015, the football club he supports. He stood down in December 2018.

In 2016 he took part in The Great Sport Relief Bake Off and series 14 of the BBC's Strictly Come Dancing. He was partnered with Katya Jones, a Russian professional dancer. Writing about his performance in the sixth week Halloween special, Michael Hogan of The Daily Telegraph said "The dad-dancing politician got a standing ovation from the studio audience, chuckles from the judges and enough viewer votes to keep him out of yet another dance-off." His dance to "Gangnam Style" was nominated for the Must-See Moment Award at the 2017 Television BAFTAs. He was eventually eliminated in week 10.

Balls' autobiographical memoir Speaking Out was published in August 2016. In the book, he said Labour's four-week general election campaign in 2015 was "astonishingly dysfunctional" and "we weren't ready – and didn't deserve – to return to government". He also described Jeremy Corbyn's leadership project as a "leftist utopian fantasy, devoid of connection to the reality of people's lives".

A three-part documentary, Travels in Trumpland with Ed Balls, began broadcasting on BBC Two on 29 July 2018. It looked at supporters of the then President Trump and how things have changed. During one episode, Balls took part in a professional wrestling match in order to explore the correlation between Trump and the sport. Another three-part documentary, Travels in Euroland with Ed Balls, began broadcasting on BBC Two on 23 January 2020. It explores anti-elite sentiment in Europe, the rise of right-wing politics, and the effect austerity has had in European politics.

In September 2017, Balls was placed at Number 74 in 'The 100 Most Influential People on the Left' by commentator Iain Dale. In November 2017, Balls was a contestant on the British TV show Would I Lie to You?, where he revealed that he had once negotiated the Home Office budget while crawling in a children's ball pit.

In January and February 2021, Balls was the winner in BBC One's Celebrity Best Home Cook. In May 2021, in celebration of "Lifelong Learning Week", Balls hosted a special event at adult education provider City Lit alongside its Principal, Mark Malcomson. Balls discussed the importance of lifelong learning and his time at City Lit as well as his memoir Appetite. Balls received a City Lit Lifetime Fellowship Award as recognition for the support and inspiration he provided to the organisation and its students.

On 8 and 15 November 2021, Balls presented Ed Balls: Crisis In Care on BBC Two, a two-part documentary exploring the challenges facing social care providers in England. On 30 November 2021, he was the subject of the BBC television programme Who Do You Think You Are?.

On 14 September 2023, Balls and George Osborne started hosting the economics-focused politics podcast Political Currency. On 17 January 2024, Balls received publicity for accidentally kicking Good Morning Britain presenter Susanna Reid in the head during a segment on travel etiquette. He apologised immediately, and repeated his apologies later in the programme.

On 5 August 2024, Balls interviewed MP Zarah Sultana on the then ongoing anti-immigrant riots in the UK, in which he repeatedly interrupted and verbally clashed with her when she argued the unrest should be condemned as "Islamophobic". During the same broadcast, Balls interviewed his own wife, Yvette Cooper, in her role as Home Secretary. Ofcom reported a total of 8,201 complaints received over the episode, stemming from both of the interviews.

== Personal life ==
Balls married Labour MP Yvette Cooper, who later became Home Secretary, Foreign Secretary and Health Secretary, in Eastbourne on 10 January 1998. Cooper is Member of Parliament for Pontefract, Castleford and Knottingley, the neighbouring constituency to Morley & Outwood from 2010 to 2024. They have three children. In January 2008, they became the first married couple to serve together in HM Cabinet when Cooper became Chief Secretary to the Treasury, although Cooper had attended cabinet sessions as housing minister prior to then.

In September 2010, the British Stammering Association announced that Balls had become a patron of the association. Its chief executive, Norbert Lieckfeldt, commended Balls for talking about his stammer in public.

In June 2013, Balls was fined for going through a red light in December 2012. He has also admitted speeding in April 2013 and using his mobile phone while driving during the 2010 general election campaign. On 5 August 2014, he was fined £900 and given five penalty points on his driving licence for failing to stop after a car accident. He said he knew that the cars had touched, but did not stop to check as he did not think any damage had been done.

Balls was portrayed by Nicholas Burns in the 2015 Channel 4 television film Coalition.

Balls is a member of a band called Centrist Dad. Balls, who plays the drums, is accompanied by Robert Peston on vocals, and John Wilson on bass guitar.

== Publications ==
- Speaking Out: Lessons in Life and Politics (20 April 2017) ISBN 978-1784755935
- Appetite: A Memoir in Recipes of Family and Food (19 August 2021) ISBN 978-1398504745

== See also ==
- Ed Balls document leak

Parliament of the United Kingdom
Preceded by Bill O'Brien	Member of Parliament for Normanton; 2005–2010	Constituency abolished
New constituency	Member of Parliament for Morley and Outwood; 2010–2015	Succeeded by Andrea Jenkyns
Political offices
Preceded by Ivan Lewis	Economic Secretary to the Treasury; 2006–2007	Succeeded by Kitty Ussher
Preceded by Alan Johnson as Secretary of State for Education	Secretary of State for Children, Schools and Families; 2007–2010	Succeeded by Michael Gove as Secretary of State for Education
Preceded by Michael Gove as Shadow Secretary of State for Children, Schools and Families	Shadow Secretary of State for Education; 2010	Succeeded by Andy Burnham
Preceded by Alan Johnson	Shadow Home Secretary; 2010–2011	Succeeded by Yvette Cooper
Preceded by Alan Johnson	Shadow Chancellor of the Exchequer; 2011–2015	Succeeded by Chris Leslie
Party political offices
Preceded by Seema Malhotra	Chair of the Fabian Society; 2006–2007	Succeeded by Anne Campbell
Sporting positions
Preceded by Alan Bowkett	Chairman of Norwich City F.C. 2015–2018	Succeeded by James Stedman Cullen
