= Gloria Hunniford =

Northern Irish television presenter (born 1940)

Gloria Hunniford OBE
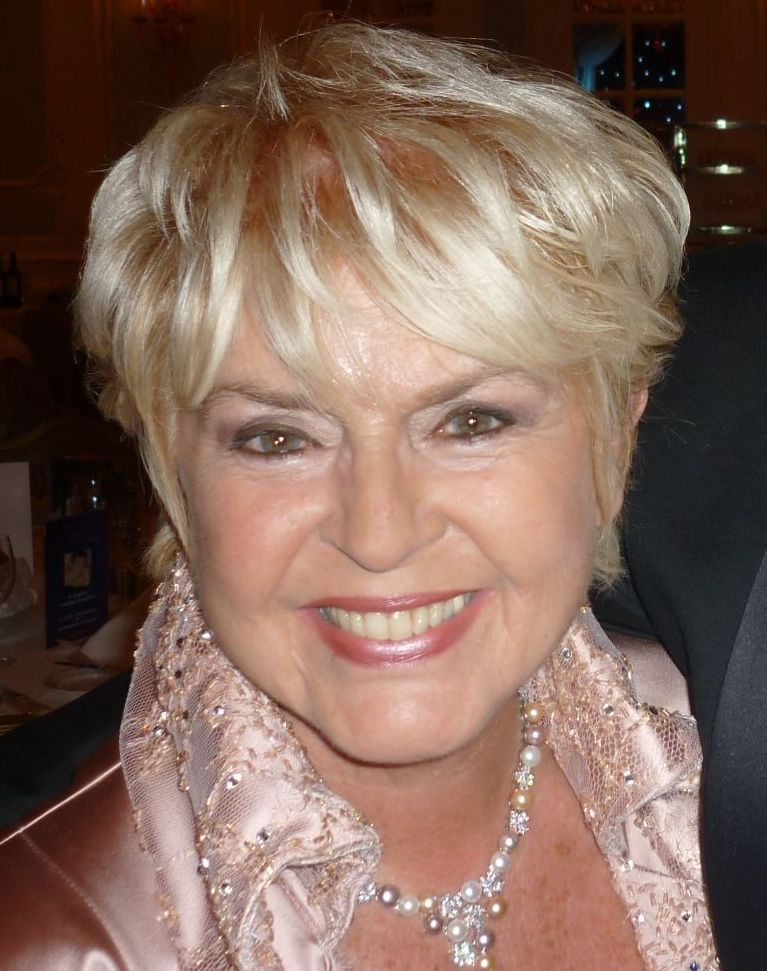
- Hunniford in 2011
- Born: Mary Winifred Gloria Hunniford; 10 April 1940 (age 86); Portadown, Northern Ireland
- Occupations: Television and radio presenter, singer
- Years active: 1947–present
- Television: Open House with Gloria Hunniford; Rip Off Britain; Loose Women
- Spouses: Don Keating (m. 1970; div. 1992) Stephen Way (m. 1998; died 2024)
- Children: 3; including Caron Keating

Mary Winifred Gloria Hunniford (born 10 April 1940) is a television and radio presenter, broadcaster and singer from Northern Ireland. She is known for presenting programmes on the BBC and ITV, such as Rip Off Britain, and her regular appearances as a panellist on Loose Women. She has been a regular reporter on This Morning and The One Show. She also enjoyed a singing career from the 1960s to the 1980s.

== Early life ==
Gloria Hunniford was born in Portadown, into a Protestant family. Her father, a magician, was a member of the Orange Order. She had an older sister, Lena, and a younger brother, Charles. In her teens, she spent some time in Kingston, Ontario, Canada, a period she considers important in broadening her outlook.

== Career ==
=== Television ===
After starting off as a singer, Hunniford worked as a production assistant for UTV in Belfast, then as a local radio broadcaster for the BBC; it was at UTV that she met her first husband, Don Keating, a Catholic. In the 1970s and 1980s, she was the presenter of Good Evening Ulster and on ITV's Sunday Sunday and We Love TV. She has also appeared on many programmes as a guest, including Blankety Blank and on Call My Bluff.

Hunniford recorded two albums that were released in the 1970s. In 1985, she sang at the Royal Variety Performance. As part of the film musicals theme, she sang "Secret Love" from Calamity Jane, as originally performed by Doris Day.

In 1995, Hunniford became one of the presenters of the long-running BBC chat show series Pebble Mill at One where she also presented a special one-off episode interviewing Doris Day.

From 1998 to 2003, Hunniford presented Open House with Gloria Hunniford for Channel 5. In August 2010, she appeared as a panellist/presenter on the ITV daytime programme 3@Three.

Since 2009, Hunniford has co-presented Rip Off Britain, a consumer complaints programme on BBC One with Angela Rippon and, for the first two series, Jennie Bond, and then, for the third series, with Julia Somerville replacing Bond. Together, the trio of Hunniford, Rippon and Somerville also presented Charlie's Consumer Angels.

In 2012, Hunniford presented the BBC One documentary series Doorstep Crime 999.

From 8 September 2014, Hunniford became a regular panellist on ITV chat show Loose Women. She was previously a guest panellist in 2003. She has guest anchored the show on 4 occasions between October 2014 and August 2016.

In 2014, Hunniford presented the first series of BBC One programme Home Away from Home. Gyles Brandreth presented the second series. She has also presented three series of Food: Truth or Scare with Chris Bavin from 2016.

In January 2022, Hunniford appeared on the third series of The Masked Singer as "Snow Leopard". She was second to be unmasked.

=== Strictly Come Dancing ===
In 2005, Hunniford appeared in the third series of the BBC's Strictly Come Dancing, dancing with Darren Bennett and was eliminated from the competition on the third week.

=== Guest appearances ===
Hunniford has appeared on numerous programmes including Gloria Live, Wogan, Holiday, Songs of Praise, That's Showbusiness, Kilroy and Sunday, Sunday.

In 2008, Hunniford was a regular panellist on Through the Keyhole and was a celebrity homeowner on an episode in 2018. On 27 September 2013, Hunniford appeared on an episode of Piers Morgan's Life Stories. On 28 January 2014, Hunniford took part in an episode of Celebrity Who Wants to Be a Millionaire?

=== Radio ===
Hunniford had her own daily radio show on BBC Radio 2, starting with the lunchtime show in January 1982 before moving to an afternoon slot between 2.00 pm and 3.30 pm in January 1984, where she remained for 11 years until April 1995, when she was replaced by Debbie Thrower. Hunniford also hosted Sounding Brass, a music phone-in request programme with a live brass band, devised by radio producer Owen Spencer-Thomas.

== Other work ==
Hunniford has made a health and exercise video called Fit for Life. She also has written an Irish recipe book with her sister Lena, Gloria Hunniford's Family Cookbook.

=== Charity involvements ===
Hunniford is a Patron of Hope for Tomorrow, a UK charity providing Mobile Cancer Care Units (MCCUs). Hunniford is also a patron of The Stag Theatre in Sevenoaks, a not-for-profit charity and a community arts venue with a 451-seat theatre, two cinema screens, alternative performance studio and meeting rooms. Any surplus revenue is reinvested back into the business and building.

== Personal life ==
Hunniford was married to Don Keating, who was English but had Irish Catholic roots, from 1970 to 1992. They had a daughter, Caron Keating, and two sons, Paul and Michael.

Hunniford's daughter Caron Keating (5 October 1962 – 13 April 2004) died of breast cancer in Kent. Hunniford set up a cancer charity in her daughter's name, the Caron Keating Foundation.

Hunniford was appointed Officer of the Order of the British Empire (OBE) in the 2017 Birthday Honours for services to cancer charities.

On 5 September 1998, Hunniford married hairdresser Stephen Way at parish church St Peter's, Hever, Kent. He died aged 85, on 13 August 2024.

Hunniford lives in Sevenoaks, Kent.

In June 2022, Hunniford suffered a fall at home, breaking a bone under her eye. As a result, she missed out on the Platinum Jubilee celebrations.

On 14 May 2026, Hunniford received the Freedom of the City of London for her outstanding contribution to entertainment and campaigning work as a breast cancer charity ambassador.

=== Political views ===
On The Alan Titchmarsh Show on 6 May 2011, Hunniford revealed her support for David Cameron's Conservative-led coalition government, describing herself as "a bit of a David Cameron fan", although she criticised the government's decision to continue giving aid to Pakistan when it was making cuts in the UK.

In August 2014, Hunniford was one of 200 public figures who were signatories to a letter to The Guardian opposing Scottish independence in the run-up to September's referendum on that issue.

== Filmography ==
Television

Year	Show	Role	Note(s)
1978–1987	Good Evening Ulster	Presenter	
1982–1990	Sunday, Sunday	Presenter	
1984–86	We Love TV	Presenter	
1988, 1992–93	Eurovision Song Contest Previews	Presenter	
1995	Pebble Mill at One	Presenter	
1998–2002	Open House with Gloria Hunniford	Presenter	
2003, 2014—	Loose Women	Guest panellist (2003)	Guest Anchor (2014–2016)
2003, 2014—	Loose Women	Regular panellist (2014—)	Guest Anchor (2014–2016)
2004–05, 2011	This Morning	Guest presenter	Newspaper reviewer
2005	Strictly Come Dancing	Contestant	
2009	The One Show	Guest presenter	Regular contributor and reporter
2010	3@Three	Panellist	
2009—	Rip Off Britain	Presenter	
2012	Doorstep Crime 999	Presenter	
2013—	The Travelling Picture Show	Presenter	Broadcast in Northern Ireland
2014	Home Away From Home	Presenter	1 series
2016—	Food: Truth or Scare	Co-presenter	3 series; with Chris Bavin
2017	When Chat Shows Go Horribly Wrong	Narrator	1 episode
2017	Britain's Home Truths	Presenter	1 episode
2018	Get Away for Winter	Narrator	1 series
2022	The Masked Singer	Contestant (Snow Leopard mask)	2 episode; season 3
2023	B&B by the Sea	Herself	1 episode

== Discography ==
=== Albums ===
- That's How I Spell I.R.E.L.A.N.D. (1970), Outlet
- Good Evening...Gloria Hunniford (1979), Release
- A Taste of Hunni (1982), Ritz (compilation)

=== Singles ===
- "Are You Ready for Love" (1969), Metronome
- "Give the Children Back Their Childhood" (1979), Release
- "True Love" (1987), Honey Bee – Foster & Allen with Gloria Hunniford
- "Give the Children Back Their Childhood" (1988), Ocean
- "Pudsey's Picnic" (1989), President – Gloria Hunniford, Adrian Love & Graham Dolby

== See also ==
- List of Strictly Come Dancing contestants
