= Mary Berry =

English food writer and television presenter (born 1935)

Dame Mary Berry DBE
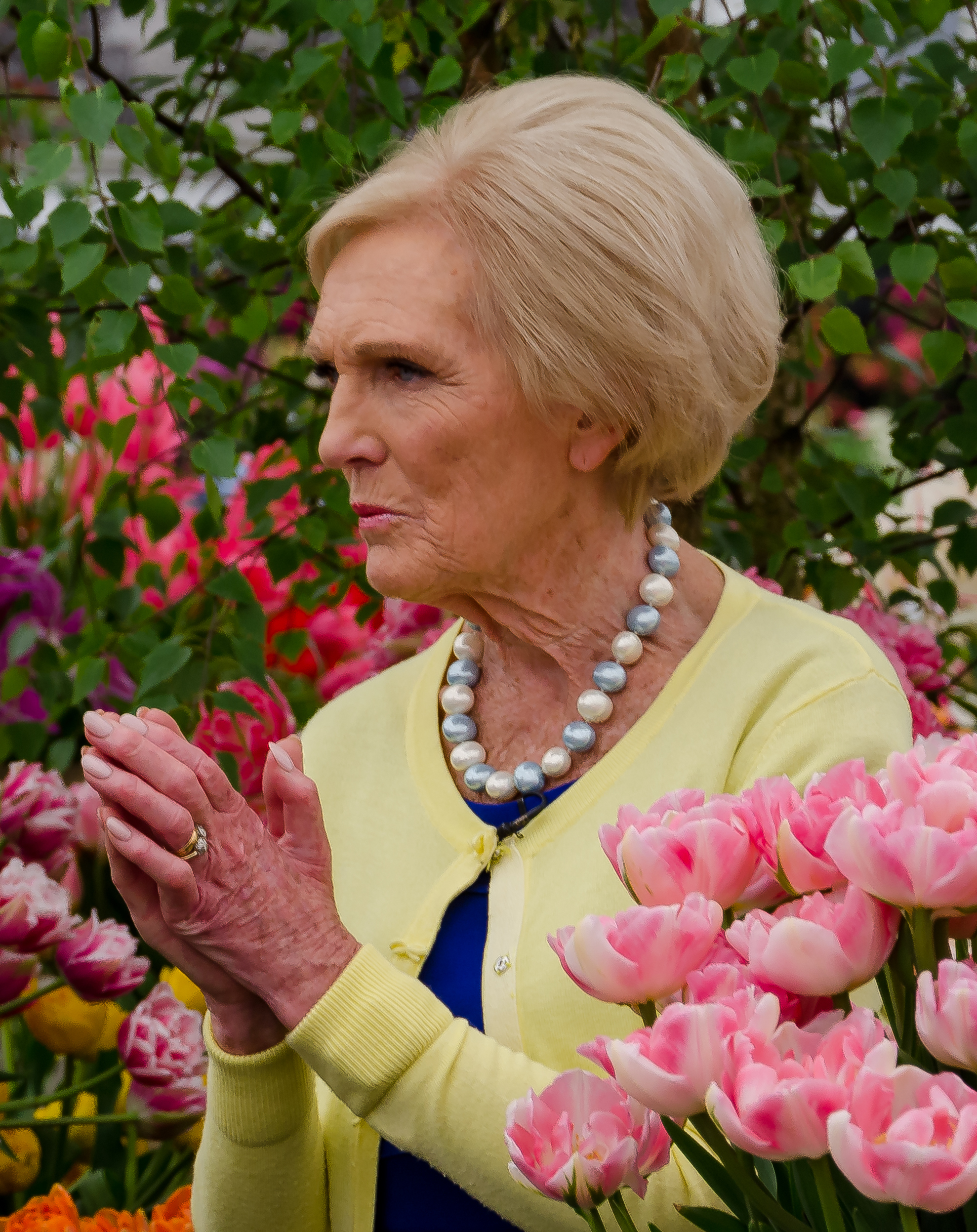
- Berry at the Chelsea Flower Show in May 2017
- Born: Mary Rosa Alleyne Berry; 24 March 1935 (age 91); Bath, Somerset, England
- Other names: Mary, Queen of Cakes
- Education: Bath College of Domestic Science; Le Cordon Bleu
- Occupations: Food writer; chef; baker; television presenter; author
- Television: The Great British Bake Off (2010–2016); The Mary Berry Story (2013); Mary Berry Cooks (2014); Mary Berry's Absolute Favourites (2015); Mary Berry's Foolproof Cooking (2016); Mary Berry Everyday (2017); Classic Mary Berry (2018); Britain's Best Home Cook (2018–2021); Mary Berry's Quick Cooking (2019); A Berry Royal Christmas (2019); Mary Berry's Simple Comforts (2020); Mary Makes Christmas (2024); Mary Berry's Christmas Countdown (2026)
- Spouse: Paul Hunnings (m. 1966)
- Children: 3
- Mary Berry's voice from the BBC programme Desert Island Discs, 29 July 2012.
- Website: maryberry.co.uk

Dame Mary Rosa Alleyne Hunnings (née Berry; born 24 March 1935) is an English food writer, chef, baker and television presenter. After being encouraged in domestic science classes at school, she studied catering at college. She then moved to France at the age of 22 to study at Le Cordon Bleu culinary school, before working in a number of cooking-related jobs.

Berry has published more than 75 cookery books, including her best-selling Baking Bible in 2009. Her first book was The Hamlyn All Colour Cookbook in 1970. She hosted several television series for the BBC and Thames Television. Berry is an occasional contributor to Woman's Hour and Saturday Kitchen. She was a judge on the television programme The Great British Bake Off from 2010 until 2016.

== Early life ==
Berry was born on 24 March 1935, the second of three children, to Margaret (née Wilson; 1905–2011) and Alleyne William Steward Berry (1904–1989), a chartered surveyor and planner who served as Mayor of Bath in 1952 and was closely involved in establishing the University of Bath at Claverton Down. Mary's paternal great-great-grandfather, Robert Houghton, was a master baker in the 1860s who provided bread for a local workhouse in Norwich. Her mother, who was originally from Scotland, died in 2011 aged 105.

At the age of 13, Berry contracted polio and had to spend three months in the Claverton Down Isolation Hospital. Her illness resulted in her having a twisted spine, a weaker left hand and thinner left arm. She has said that the period of forced separation from her family while in the hospital "toughened [her] up" and taught her to make the most of every opportunity she would have.

Berry attended Bath High School, an all-girls independent school. She described her academic abilities as "hopeless" until she attended domestic science classes with a teacher called Miss Date, who was particularly encouraging of her cooking abilities. Her first creation in the class was a treacle sponge pudding which she took home, and her father told her that it was as good as that made by her mother. She then studied catering at Bath College of Domestic Science.

== Career ==
Berry's first job was at the Bath Electricity Board showroom and then conducting home visits to show new customers how to use their electric ovens. She would typically demonstrate the ovens by making a Victoria sponge, a technique she would later repeat when in television studios to test out an oven she had not used before. Her catchment area for demonstrations was limited to the greater Bath area, which she drove around in a Ford Popular supplied as a company car.

Her ambition was to move out of the family home to London, which her parents would not allow until she was 21. At the age of 22, she applied to work at the Dutch Dairy Bureau, while taking City & Guilds courses in the evenings. She then persuaded her manager to pay for her to undertake the professional qualification from the French Le Cordon Bleu school.

She left the Dutch Dairy Bureau to become a recipe tester for PR firm Benson's, where she began to write her first book. She has since cooked for a range of food-related bodies, including the Egg Council and the Flour Advisory Board. In 1966 she became food editor of Housewife magazine. She was food editor of Ideal Home magazine from 1970 to 1973.

Her first cookbook, The Hamlyn All Colour Cookbook, was published in 1970. She launched her own product range in 1994 with her daughter Annabel. The salad dressings and sauces were originally only sold at Mary's AGA cooking school, but have since been sold in Britain, Germany and Ireland with retailers such as Harrods, Fortnum & Mason and Tesco.

In December 2012, Berry became the first president of the new Bath Spa University Alumni Association. She has also appeared on a BBC Two series called The Great British Food Revival, and her solo show, Mary Berry Cooks, began airing on 3 March 2014.

In her own kitchen, she uses a KitchenAid mixer which she describes as being the one gadget she could not live without. She has always had an AGA cooker, and used to run cooking courses for AGA users. She describes Raymond Blanc's restaurant Le Manoir aux Quat' Saisons as one of her favourites, as well as the Old Queen's Head, local to where she lived in Penn, High Wycombe.

In February 2015, Berry featured in a programme in aid of the Third World charity Comic Relief. In May 2015, she began presenting a new BBC Two series called Mary Berry's Absolute Favourites. In November 2015, she was the subject of a two-part biographical documentary entitled The Mary Berry Story. Starting on 30 November 2015, she was one of the two judges for a four-week American edition of the popular baking competition The Great Holiday Baking Show on ABC, which followed a similar format to the British competition.

Berry became President of the National Garden Scheme in 2016; for over 20 years, she had opened her garden for charity.

In November 2016, it was announced that Berry would present a new six-part series, Mary Berry Everyday in which she would share her cooking tips, family favourites and special occasion recipes. The show aired on BBC Two.

In April 2017, Berry launched a series of cakes that could be bought from supermarkets. The cakes contain emulsifiers and preservatives that Berry has previously described as "unwanted extras". From 22 November 2017 to 13 December 2017, Berry presented a four-part series called Mary Berry's Country House Secrets on BBC One. In this series, she ventured to four of the UK's stately homes and explored each through the prism of food and history. The locations were Highclere Castle, Scone Palace, Powderham Castle and Goodwood House.

In 2018, Berry was a judge on Britain's Best Home Cook alongside chef Dan Doherty and Chris Bavin.

Berry's new six-part television cookery series called Mary Berry's Simple Comforts premiered on BBC Two, 9 September 2020.

Mary Berry Saves Christmas, a BBC One special in which Berry helps a group of amateur cooks make a Christmas feast for their families, was shown on Christmas Day 2020.

In 2021, Berry was a celebrity judge on the BBC series Celebrity Best Home Cook alongside Angela Hartnett and Chris Bavin; while Claudia Winkleman was the show's presenter. In December 2021, Berry presented Mary Berry's Festive Feasts, a BBC TV special in which she teaches three novice cooks to create a Christmas feast.

In 2022, Berry was named as one of the judges for the Platinum Pudding, a competition to create a British pudding to celebrate the Platinum Jubilee of Queen Elizabeth II. In March 2022 BBC One aired the three-part series Mary Berry's Fantastic Feasts. In May 2022, Berry was a judge on the BBC One programme The Jubilee Pudding: 70 Years in the Baking, where she helped choose a brand new pudding to mark the Queen's Platinum Jubilee. In June 2022, the BBC commissioned the BBC Two series Mary Berry Cook And Share; which premiered on 7 September 2022.

In September 2022, the BBC commissioned Mary Berry's Ultimate Christmas, a Christmas special that Berry presented.

During November and December 2023, Berry presented Mary Makes It Easy; a six-part series that aired on BBC Two. In December 2023, BBC One aired Mary Berry's Highland Christmas; a festive cookery special presented by Berry.

In July 2024 the BBC commissioned the six-part series Mary's Foolproof Dinners. It aired later in the year on BBC Two, and was accompanied by a book of the same name, that includes 120 new recipes from the series and from Mary Berry's Highland Christmas.

Mary Makes Christmas, a one-off festive television special aired in December 2024 on BBC1.

On 24 March 2025 a special live edition of BBC's The One Show featured Berry for a celebration of her 90th birthday.

In autumn 2025, Berry presented Mary at 90: A Lifetime of Cooking; a six-part cookery series featuring some of Berry's favourite recipes. On Christmas Eve 2025, A Mary Berry Christmas was broadcast on BBC2, a Christmas cookery programme featuring Berry and celebrities; Alison Steadman, Harry Aikines-Aryeetey and Zoe Ball.

=== The Great British Bake Off ===
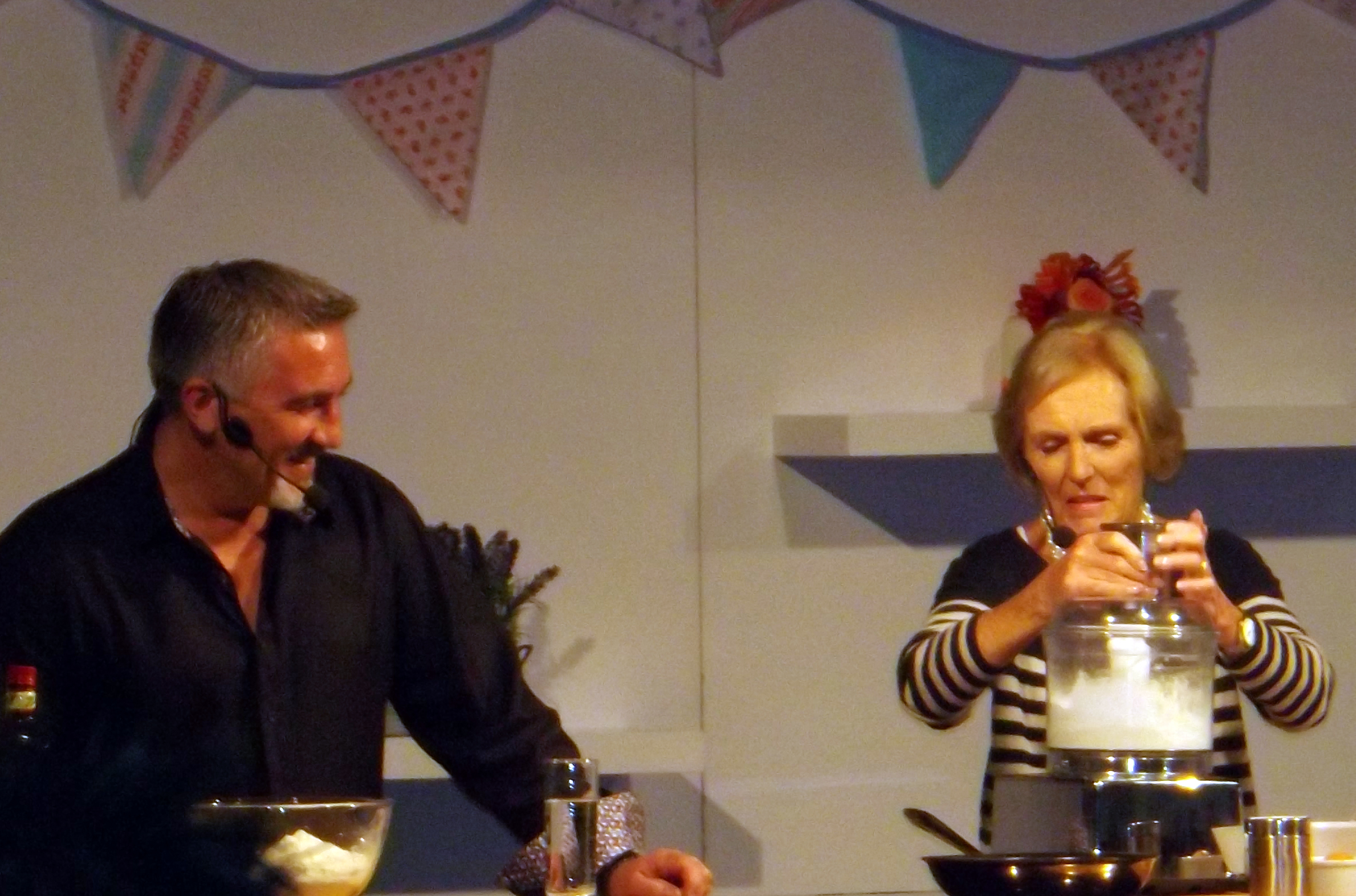
Mary Berry and Paul Hollywood at Cake International London 2013

From 2010 to 2016, Berry was one of the judges on BBC One's (formerly, BBC Two's) The Great British Bake Off alongside baker Paul Hollywood, who specialises in bread. Berry says that since working together, she has learned from him. However, some viewers were outraged during the first series when a decision was made to make the contestants use one of Hollywood's recipes for scones instead of one of Berry's.

Berry's work on the show with Hollywood led to The Guardian suggesting that it was the "best reality TV judging partnership ever." In September 2016, Love Productions announced that a three-year deal to broadcast the show on Channel 4 instead of the BBC from 2017 had been agreed. Co-hosts Mel Giedroyc and Sue Perkins announced that they would not be continuing with Bake Off on its new network. Berry announced she was also leaving Bake Off on the same day that fellow judge Paul Hollywood announced he would be staying with the show. She was replaced on the show by Prue Leith.

== The Platinum Pudding Competition ==
In January 2022, it was announced that Berry would chair and sit as a judge on The Platinum Pudding Competition, a nationwide baking competition launched throughout the United Kingdom on 10 January 2022 by Buckingham Palace, Fortnum & Mason and The Big Jubilee Lunch. The competition sought a new pudding dedicated to Queen Elizabeth II as part of the official Platinum Jubilee celebrations in 2022 marking the 70th anniversary of her accession on 6 February 1952.

== Personal life ==
Berry married Paul John March Hunnings in 1966. He worked for Harvey's of Bristol, selling antique books, and is now retired. The couple had two sons and a daughter; in 1989, one of their sons died aged 19, in a car accident. In 2011, Berry's mother Margaret died, aged 105.

In March 2013, Berry was placed second in a list of the fifty best-dressed over 50s by The Guardian. In September 2014, Berry was the subject of an episode of the BBC genealogy series Who Do You Think You Are? and discovered among her ancestors illegitimacy, bankruptcy and a baker.

In 2018 Berry and her husband moved to Henley-on-Thames, Oxfordshire. The couple had previously lived in Penn, Buckinghamshire for more than 40 years.

Berry is a member of the Church of England and worshipped at Holy Trinity Church in Penn from 1989. Her mother, who died in 2011, had also been an active church member. As part of the BBC Two programme Mary Berry's Easter Feast at Easter 2016, Berry visited Bishopthorpe Palace, the official residence of the Archbishop of York, who is the second most senior cleric in the Church of England, and filmed a special "Cooking with the Archbishop" segment.

Berry is a patron of Child Bereavement UK.

== Publications ==
Berry has written more than 70 cookery books since her first book was published in 1970, and has sold over five million copies. She regularly works on her cookery books with Lucy Young, who has been her assistant for over 20 years. Her best-selling Baking Bible was rated one of the ten best baking books by The Independent.

Since September 2014, Berry's recipes have also been packaged in an interactive mobile app called "Mary Berry: In Mary We Trust".

Her autobiography, Recipe for Life, was published in 2013 by Michael Joseph.

== Honours and awards ==
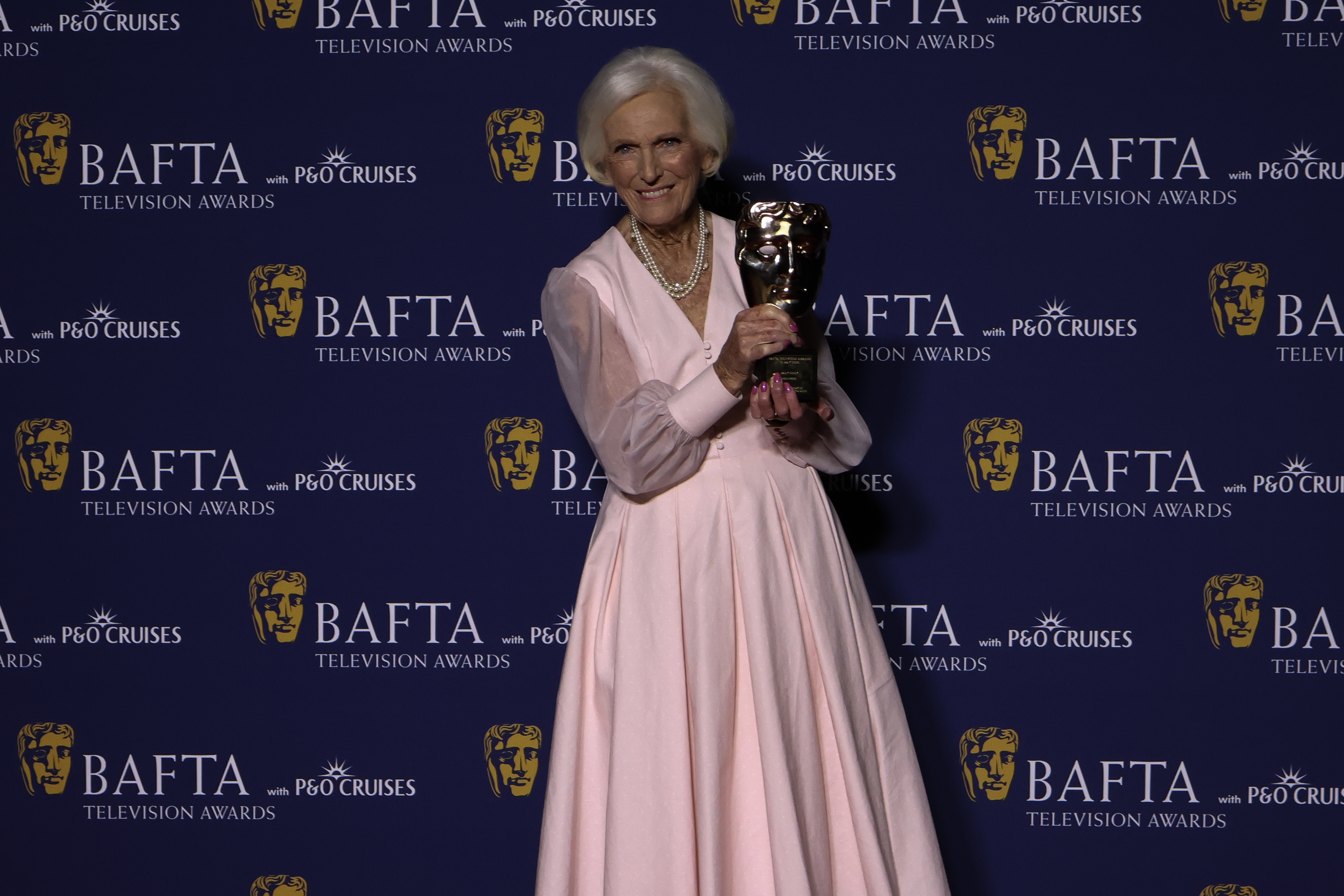
Berry with the BAFTA Fellowship in 2026

In June 2009, Berry was awarded the Guild of Food Writers Lifetime Achievement Award.

Berry was appointed Commander of the Order of the British Empire (CBE) in the 2012 Birthday Honours for services to culinary arts.

In 2012, she was awarded an honorary degree by Bath Spa University which incorporates the former Bath College of Domestic Science.

On 7 June 2014, Berry was awarded the Freedom of the City of Bath; and, having already received the Freedom of the City of London, on 19 November 2014, she was made a liveryman of the Worshipful Company of Bakers.

She was awarded the Specsavers National Book Awards "Outstanding Achievement" prize in December 2014.

On 25 January 2017, Berry won the award for Best TV Judge at the National Television Awards for Great British Bake Off.

Berry was appointed Dame Commander of the Order of the British Empire (DBE) in the 2020 Birthday Honours for services to broadcasting, the culinary arts and charity. She received the honour on 20 October 2021 at Windsor Castle.

On 10 May 2026, at the 2026 BAFTA Awards, Berry was awarded a BAFTA Fellowship for her exceptional contribution to television.
