= Angela Hartnett at the Connaught =

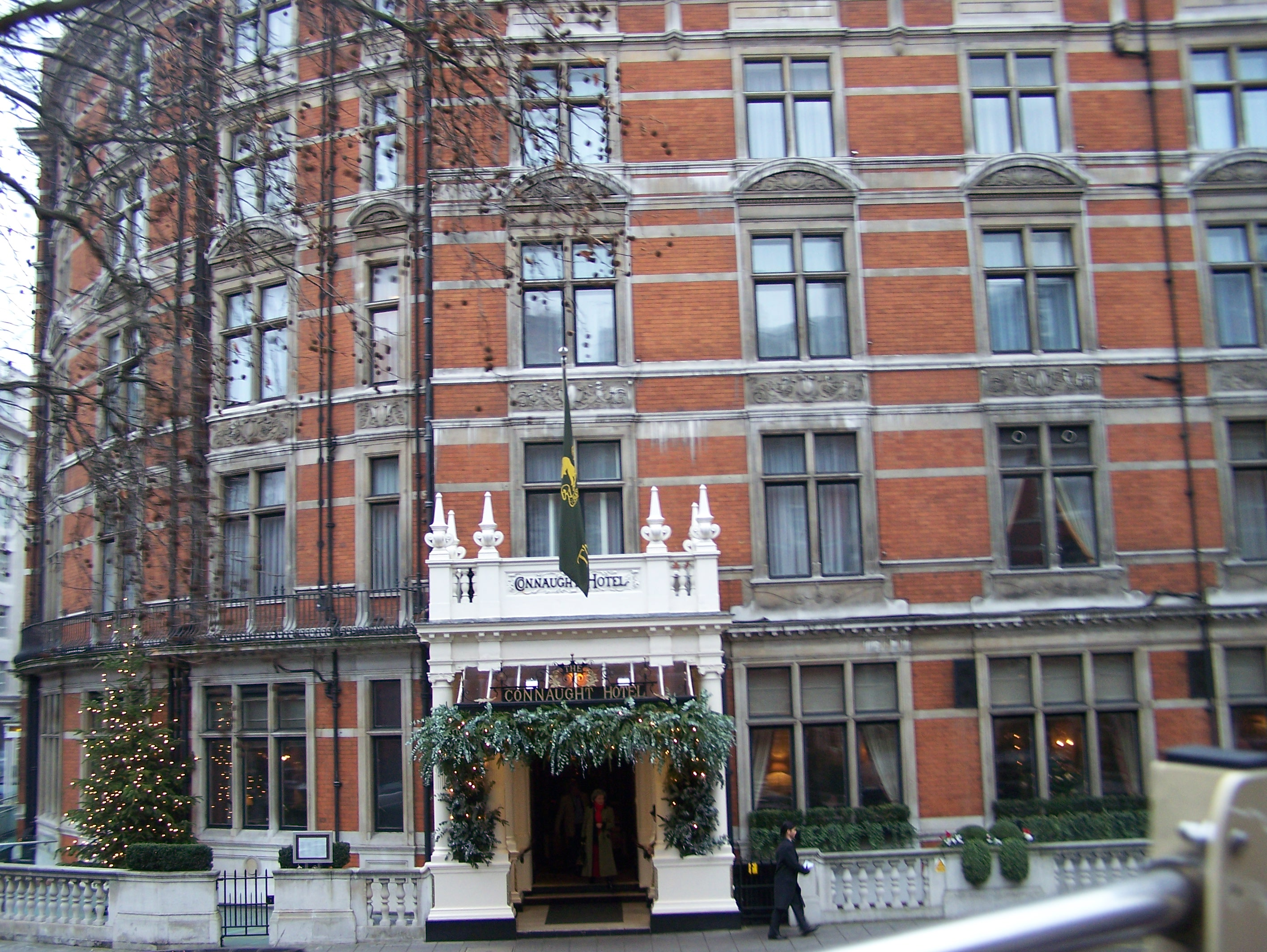
- The exterior of the Connaught hotel, photographed in 2006

- The location of The Connaught Hotel in London

Restaurant information
- Established: 2002; 24 years ago
- Closed: September 13, 2007; 18 years ago
- Chef: Angela Hartnett
- Food type: Modern European
- Rating: (Michelin Guide 2004–07)
- Location: Carlos Place, London, W1K 2AL, United Kingdom
- Coordinates: 51°30′36″N 00°08′59″W
- Seating capacity: 65

Angela Hartnett at the Connaught, also known as Menu, was a restaurant owned by Gordon Ramsay Holdings and run by chef Angela Hartnett. It was located within the Connaught hotel in Mayfair, London. The restaurant was opened following Ramsay's successful opening of Gordon Ramsay at Claridge's, within the Claridge's hotel, which is owned by the same equity group. Ramsay had originally been asked to move Restaurant Gordon Ramsay into the space, but suggested that Hartnett should run a new operation there instead. The restaurant was awarded a Michelin star in the 2004 guide and held it until it closed in 2007.

== History ==
Following the successful opening of Gordon Ramsay at Claridge's, Gordon Ramsay was invited to attend a public relations event for the Savoy Group in New York. It was there that he heard that the Connaught hotel in London was looking for a chef to take over the restaurant operation, and had recently been showing around a chef from the United States. The Connaught restaurant had previously been run by Michel Bourdin for 26 years. His father in-law and business partner Chris Hutcheson spoke to Blackstone Group, the owners of the Connaught at the time, and also of Claridges. They were immediately interested in Ramsay running the restaurant there. However, they wanted Ramsay to move his three Michelin Star restaurant at Royal Hospital Road into the hotel. Ramsay was opposed to this as he wanted to specifically keep that restaurant independent of any hotel operation.

The negotiations with Blackstone continued, who wanted a female chef to be brought in. Ramsay suggested Angela Hartnett, who was running his restaurant in Dubai and had worked with him since he ran Aubergine. She was brought back to the UK to meet with Blackstone alongside Hutcheson, and hit it off with members of the investment group immediately. Following the meeting, Blackstone agreed that she should be the one running the restaurant at the Connaught. It took six months to refurbish the main restaurant, but the hotel was also partially closed for refurbishment of many of its rooms. The restaurant's kitchen was gutted and refitted with new appliances, and vermin infestations were dealt with. New carpets were laid throughout the restaurants, although due to wear and tear, they needed to be replaced after only eleven months. It made a loss from the first month when it opened in 2002, and would take two years to turn a profit – far longer than the initial estimates of six months. The opening of the restaurant was filmed for a BBC television series, Trouble at the Top.

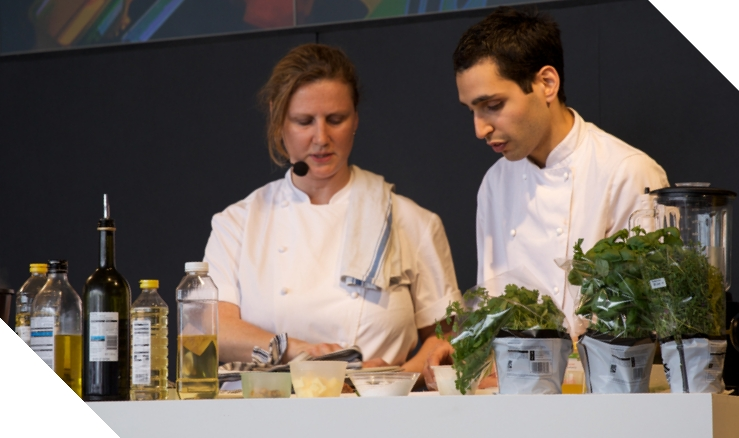
Angela Hartnett, photographed in 2009

The Connaught restaurant operation was run by 35 chefs to seat 65 diners, and initially run by Neil Ferguson who became Hartnett's head chef once she arrived properly from Dubai. Although later referred to as Angela Hartnett at the Connaught, it was initially called Menu. She was keen to distance the operation from a typical Ramsay restaurant, saying that he would not be working there at any point and the restaurant was not going to be a copy of the Claridges operation. Several of the previous staff transferred over into the new regime, although one successfully took Gordon Ramsay Holdings to court after being sacked and won a settlement of £30,000. Claire Porter, a chef who had appeared in an episode of Ramsay's Kitchen Nightmares, began working in the restaurant in 2004 but left soon afterwards. Diego Cardoso was one of the chefs who was transferred, and Hartnett recognised his ability. Cardoso became head chef at her restaurant in Florida in 2006. At the time, Harnett assured the media that she wouldn't be leaving the Connaught and would instead place a new head chef there in her stead.

Angela Hartnett at the Connaught closed as the hotel closed for refurbishment following the sale of the Savoy Group to the Quinlan Private Equity Group. Gordon Ramsay Holdings decided not to renew the lease following the renovation of the hotel. There was later speculation in the media that this was due to the restaurant's refusal to provide room service, something that owners Maybourne Hotel Group subsequently denied. When the restaurant reopened, the restaurant had been refurbished and taken over by another female chef, Hélène Darroze. Harnett took most of her team with her to eventually work at her new restaurant, Murano, and they were placed elsewhere within the restaurants of Gordon Ramsay Holdings whilst the new premises were prepared.

=== Menu ===
Hartnett described her menu as having Mediterranean influences due to her Italian roots. She was also keen to emphasise that she would be the one designing the menu, saying that "I'm not going to be doing Gordon's food, or Marcus Wareing's food, or anyone else's for that matter – I'm going to be doing my food." Prior to taking over the kitchen, she went on a culinary tour of Spain, France, Italy and the United States in order to find inspiration for the new menu. Whilst it was officially described as serving Modern European cuisine, some food critics claimed that it was serving Italian cuisine, whilst others thought it was French style Haute cuisine.

Italian dishes on the menu included a risotto with leeks and prawns, pheasant agnolotti and rabbit served with wild mushrooms and polenta. Other mains which were on the menu included fillets of John Dory with a bouillabaisse sauce, served with saffron potatoes and fennel. The dessert options included soufflés, which were made to order.

== Reception ==
The hotel's regulars were not happy with the restaurant upon opening. In Ramsay's autobiography Playing with Fire, he attributed this to the restaurant being fully booked and the former clientele were unable to simply arrive at the restaurant and expect to be seated as well as improvements to the previous menu. Restaurant critics who attended the restaurant shortly after opening gave it mixed reviews. Harden's restaurant guide described the opening as an "anticlimax".

Matthew Fort reviewed the restaurant for The Guardian in May 2003. He enjoyed the mix of classical French cooking such as a dish of roast lamb with aubergine and rosemary au jus, while he felt that other dishes had more Italian touches such as the monkfish with chicory and a sherry vinegar based sauce. He said that he was sad that the old restaurant had passed, but embraced the arrival of Harnett. He gave the restaurant a score of 18 out of 20.

Fay Maschler for the Evening Standard said that the "Italian influence on the cooking is deliciously subversive rather than high-handed". In 2004, she ranked the restaurant as one of the top 5 in London with a "female touch". The restaurant was awarded a Michelin star in the 2004 guide, which it held until 2007. It was named the Best New Restaurant at the BMW Square Meal Awards in 2003.
