= Political Currency =

British podcast

- Genre: talk
- Format: Audio podcast
- Language: English

Cast and voices
- Hosted by: Ed Balls; George Osborne

Production
- Length: c. 45 minutes

Technical specifications
- Video format: YouTube
- Audio format: Any podcast app

Publication
- No. of episodes: 341
- Original release: 14 September 2023

Reception
- Ratings: 3.7/5

Related
- Website: https://www.persephonica.com/shows/political-currency

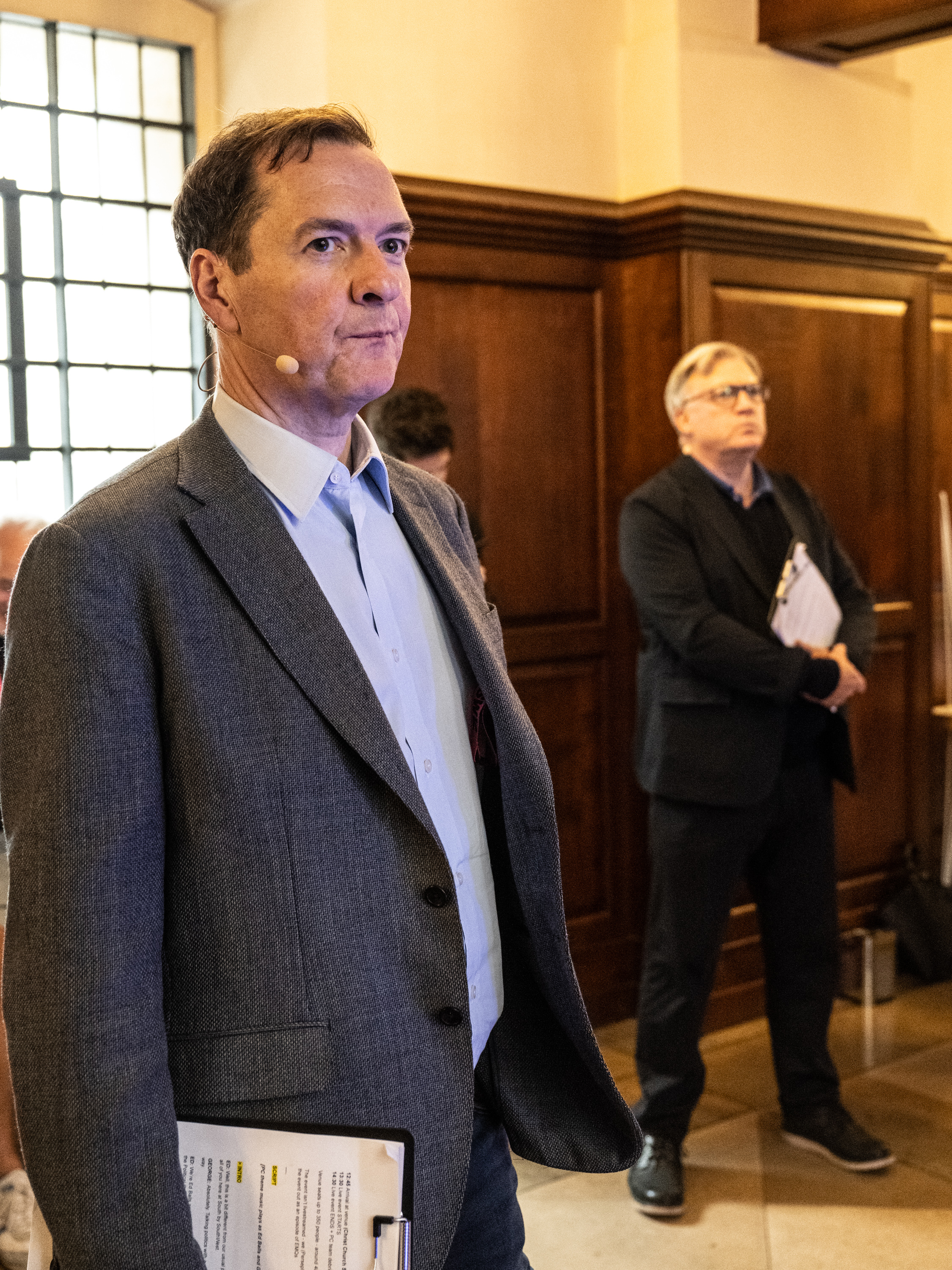
Osborne & Balls waiting to record an edition of the podcast at Christ Church Spitalfields during SXSW London, June 2025.

Political Currency is a British podcast hosted by George Osborne and Ed Balls. It launched on 14 September 2023 and is produced by Persephonica.

== Background ==
George Osborne is a former Chancellor of the Exchequer who served in David Cameron's Conservative government. He was fired as chancellor after Theresa May became prime minister in the aftermath of the 2016 Brexit referendum. Although tipped to be Cameron's successor as prime minister at one time, Osborne eventually left parliament in 2017. Subsequently, he was the editor of the Evening Standard and currently serves as the chair of the British Museum and joined Coinbase as an advisor.

Ed Balls served in New Labour governments, first as Tony Blair's Economic Secretary to the Treasury and later as Gordon Brown's Secretary of State for Children Schools and families and served as Chief Economic Adviser to the Treasury when Brown was chancellor. During Osborne's time in government, Balls was Ed Miliband's Shadow Chancellor shadowing Osborne. He lost his Morley and Outwood parliamentary seat in 2015 and retired from politics. He has since taught at Harvard and King's College, London, as well as taken part in reality TV shows. He also presents Good Morning Britain a morning talk show.

In June 2023, Persephonica announced that Osborne and Balls would host an economics-focused political podcast.

== Reception ==
Since it was announced and debuted, several commentators noted the podcast's similarity to The Rest is Politics, a successful podcast hosted by Alastair Campbell and Rory Stewart. Like Balls and Osborne, Campbell and Stewart belong to the Labour and Conservative parties respectively.

Rachel Cunliffe of the New Statesman was critical of the podcast, calling it a "howl of nostalgia for a bygone era", where Osborne and Balls were seeking political relevancy after having had their political careers ended years back. Nicholas Harris noted similarly on UnHerd, quipping that the podcast has an ironic name, "a resource of which these men are utterly spent".
