= Mary Berry Cooks =

2014 British TV series

- Genre: Food, entertainment
- Presented by: Mary Berry
- Starring: Mary Berry
- Country of origin: United Kingdom
- Original language: English
- No. of series: 1
- No. of episodes: 6 (list of episodes)

Production
- Production locations: Mary Berry's house, United Kingdom
- Running time: 30 minutes

Original release
- Network: BBC Two
- Release: 3 March – 7 April 2014

Related
- Mary Berry; Mary Berry's Absolute Favourites; Mary Berry

Mary Berry Cooks was a factual food programme which aired on BBC Two in 2014, hosted by Mary Berry.

== Episode guide ==
Episode	Category	Original air date	Recipes	Ratings (millions)
1	Afternoon Tea	3 March 2014	Whole lemon cake with lemon cheesecake icing Strawberry jam Teatime scones Loaf cake with apple and cinnamon Orange butterfly cakes Chocolate traybake with feather icing	3.2
2	Dinner party	10 March 2014	Chocolate fondant tart Guinea Fowl with porcini and lardons Rib-eye steak with Stilton butter Tomato and goats' cheese doughballs Blue cheese and fig tarts Salmon and asparagus terrine	2.75
3	Sunday Lunch	17 March 2014	Yorkshire Puddings; Chilled fresh fruit salad Fennel and potato gratin Fresh mint sauce Plum and marzipan tart tatin Three fish pie Roasted lamb with rosemary and paprika	2.61
4	For a Crowd	24 March 2014	Rich beef and mushroom stew Meringue tranche with berries and cream Salmon en croûte with pesto and roasted vegetables Fool-proof green salad Wholegrain mustard mash Chocolate and orange panna cotta	2.73
5	Weekday Supper	31 March 2014	Elderflower cordial Frozen elderflower posset Lamb dhansak Cottage pie with dauphinoise potato Rich beef and mushroom stew	3.02
6	Summer Lunch	7 April 2014	Fiery red rice salad Summer pudding loaf Broad bean and Little Gem salad Roast fillet of beef with roasted garlic and mustard cream Summer fruit smoothie Maple-glazed gammon with fresh apricot and ginger chutney Salmon fillets with herb sauce, quails' eggs and asparagus	2.6

== Book ==
The official Mary Berry Cooks recipe book was released on 27 February 2014.

== International broadcast ==
- Australia — Mary Berry Cooks premiered on Lifestyle Food on 9 January 2015.
