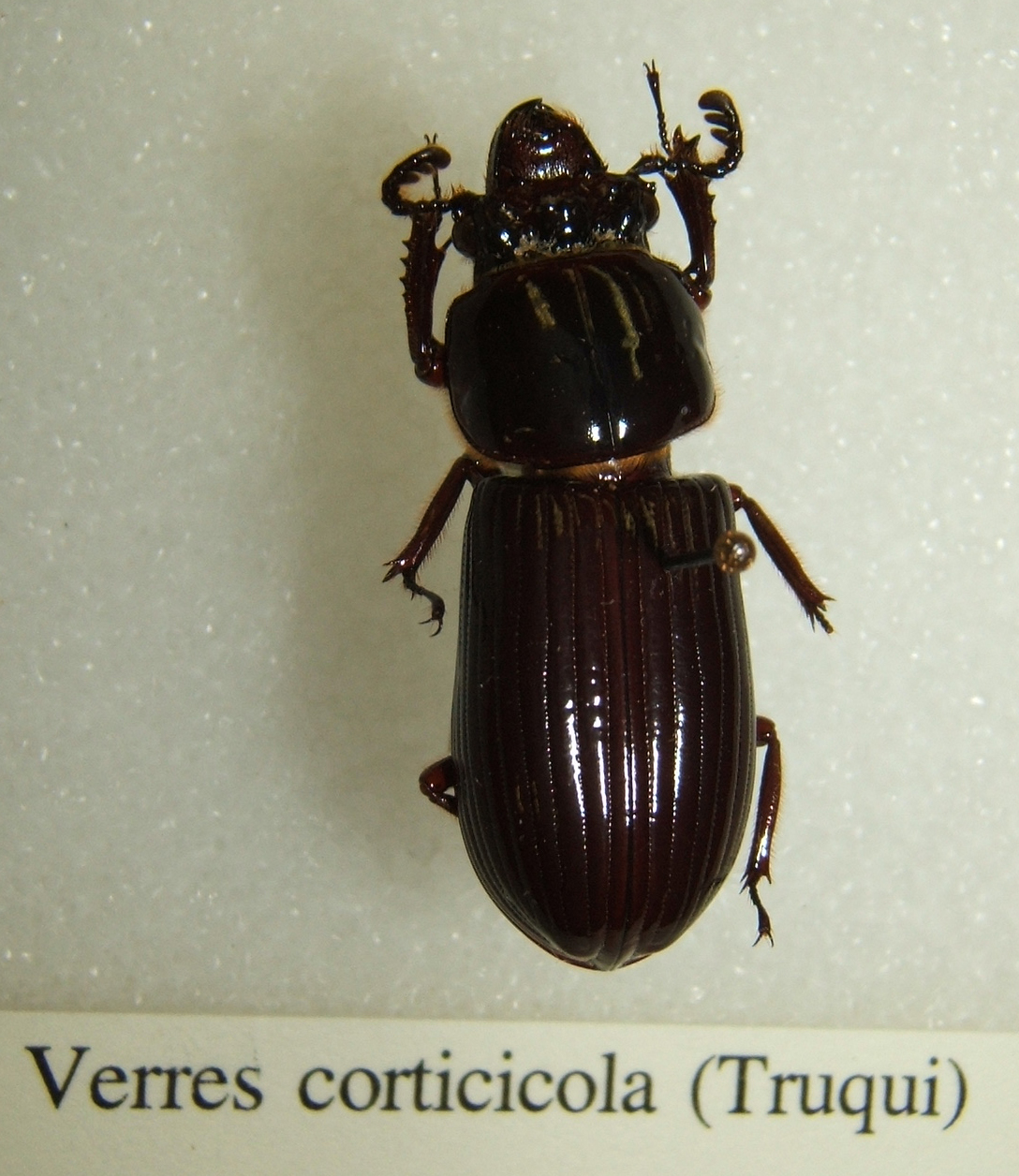
- Verres corticicola, adult

Scientific classification
- Kingdom: Animalia
- Phylum: Arthropoda
- Class: Insecta
- Order: Coleoptera
- Suborder: Polyphaga
- Infraorder: Scarabaeiformia
- Family: Passalidae
- Subfamily: Passalinae
- Tribe: Proculini
- Genus: Verres
- Species: V. corticicola

Binomial name
- Verres corticicola (Truqui, 1857)

Synonyms
- Passalus corticicola Truqui, 1857; Verres angustatus Kuwert, 1891; Verres brevicornis Luederwaldt, 1941

= Verres corticicola =

Species of beetle

Verres corticicola is a species of beetle in the family Passalidae. It is found in Colombia, Costa Rica, Guatemala, Honduras, Mexico, and Nicaragua.

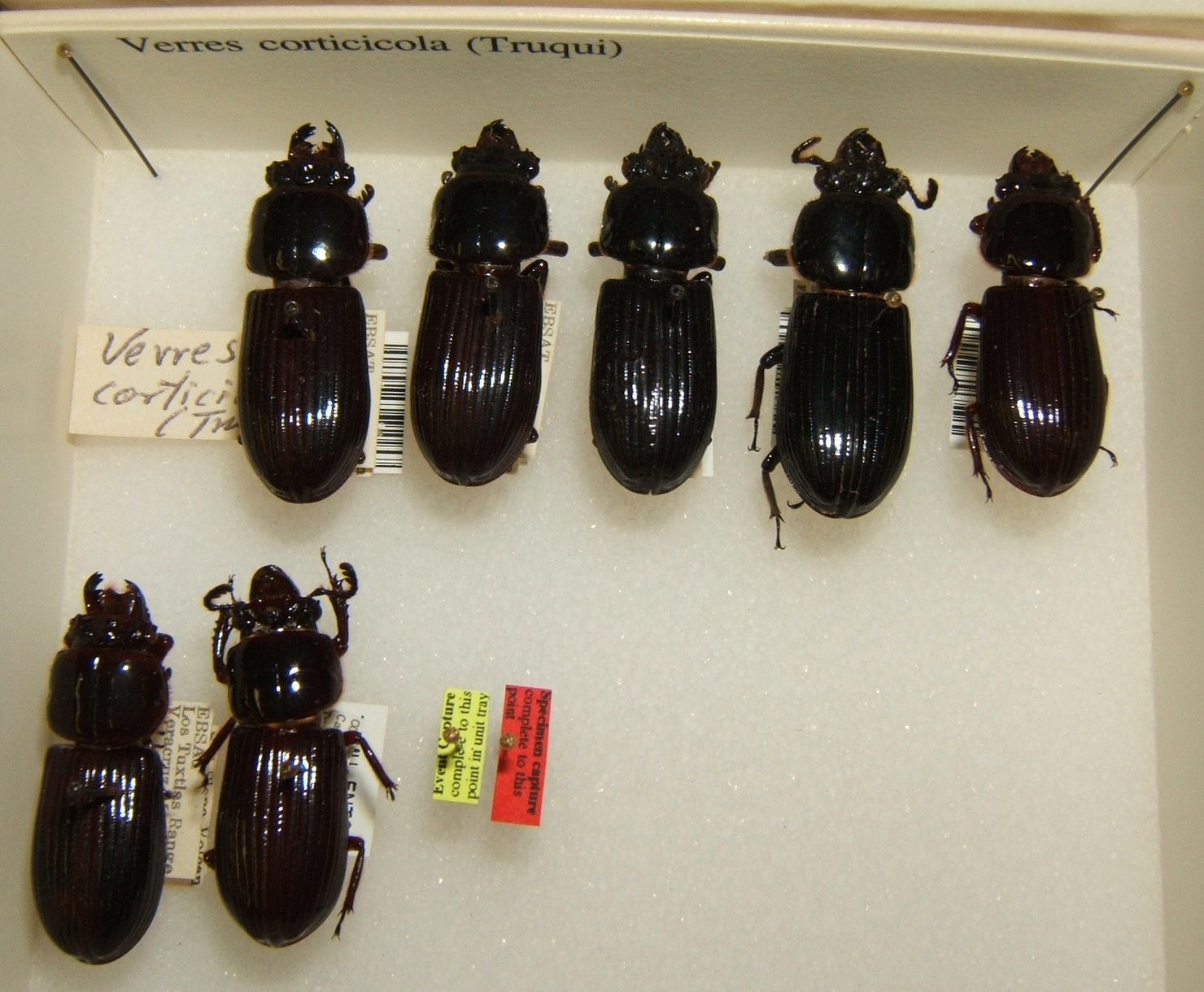
Specimen collection
