= Verre (restaurant) =

Restaurant information
- Established: 1 October 2001; 24 years ago
- Closed: 28 October 2011; 14 years ago
- Head chef: Angela Hartnett (2001–02); Jason Atherton (2002–05); Jason Whitelock (2005–??); Nick Alvis (??-2009)
- Chef: Gordon Ramsay
- Food type: European cuisine
- Location: Hilton Dubai Creek; Baniyas Street, Dubai, United Arab Emirates
- Seating capacity: 55 (initially 70)

Verre, also known as Gordon Ramsay at the Hilton Dubai Creek, was a restaurant operated by chef Gordon Ramsay which was located within the Hilton Dubai Creek. It was the first overseas restaurant to be opened by Ramsay, and was in operation for ten years between 2001 and 2011. It was a combined operation between Hilton and Ramsay, with the celebrity chef taking a percentage of the takings each month and Hilton drawing up staffing salaries and arranging the decor of the restaurant. These would both cause problems as Ramsay disliked the decor, and had to initially pay supplements to his staff to prevent them from leaving due to the lower wages paid by Hilton. Amongst the head chefs who worked at Verre, Angela Hartnett and Jason Atherton both went on to win Michelin stars upon their return to the UK. The restaurant was positively received by critics and was named the best restaurant in the Middle East in 2010.

== History ==
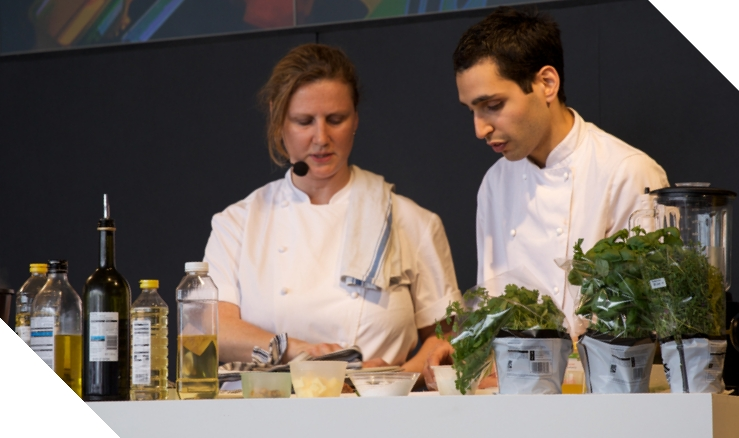
Angela Hartnett was the first head chef in the kitchen upon launch

The restaurant was the first in Dubai to be opened by a celebrity chef who had restaurants in Western Europe, and was also Gordon Ramsay's first restaurant outside of the United Kingdom. Called Verre, it was located within the Hilton hotel at Dubai Creek. It was also referred to as Gordon Ramsay at the Hilton Dubai Creek. Chefs such as Michel Rostang, Gary Rhodes, Nobu Matsuhisa and Marco Pierre White subsequently opening restaurants in hotels within the city. Verre originally sat 70 diners, but was later reduced to 55 seats. It was designed alongside the hotel by architect Carlos Ott. Both Ramsay and his business partner Chris Hutchinson had issues with the decor as they felt that a wooden floor and the lack of soft furnishings within the dining room destroyed the ambience of the restaurant. As the decor was down to the hotel, they had to request any changes through them.

The restaurant opened on 1 October 2001. Chef Angela Hartnett headed the kitchen when the restaurant was first launched, and stayed for a year until leaving to open Angela Hartnett at The Connaught in London alongside Ramsay where she won a Michelin star. She later returned in 2009 to celebrate eight years of the restaurant. Jason Atherton took over as head chef of the restaurant, having previously worked under Hartnett as executive chef. He stayed until 2005 when he moved back to London to become head chef at Ramsay's Maze. As with Hartnett, he too won a Michelin star at the new restaurant.

The restaurant initially had problems with retaining staff, who had worked in one of Ramsay's British based restaurants. While they worked at Verre, they were paid a lower Hilton based salary and so Ramsay introduced a top-up scheme to pay for the wages to increase to those which his staff were accustomed to. He later said this was a mistake, as following a decrease in customers after the 11 September attacks, the restaurant was barely keeping afloat due to the subsidies. The deal between Ramsay and Hilton resulted in him receiving only a signing fee as well as a monthly percentage of the takings. Ramsay and Hutchinson convinced Hilton to re-write the initial agreement and the wages were increased to staff allowing Ramsay to stop paying the subsidies.

In 2006 it was rumoured that Ramsay intended to move the restaurant to the Conrad Dubai upon its opening in 2009. However, the Conrad did not open until 17 September 2013, when it opened with a restaurant from Marco Pierre White amongst others. Verre was redeveloped in 2010, and a chef's table was added to the kitchen.

The lease expired after ten years and was not renewed as Ramsay was withdrawing from a number of overseas operations, although it was also speculated in the media that Ramsay could be looking to open somewhere in Dubai which was closer to the currently popular areas. Head chef Nick Alvis and executive chef Scott Price remained at the restaurant, which was renamed to Table 9. The final day of operation was 28 October 2011, while Table 9 opened for the first time on 9 November.

== Reception ==
Terry Durack reviewed the restaurant in 2005 whilst it was under Jason Whitelock. He felt that the restaurant was typical Ramsay with dishes of pork belly, foie gras and pineapple appearing on the menu. He said that the red mullet with olive tapenade and accompanied by ratatouille was a "showstopper". He said that Ramsay's take on steak and eggs was good value, with a fillet of beef served alongside a quail's egg and a slice of caramelised pig's trotter. He gave the restaurant a score of 17 out of 20, marking it as "special, can't wait to go back" on his scale. Richard Vines visited for Bloomberg in 2007, saying that the menu was well balanced and showed Whitelock's talent.

In 2010, the restaurant was named the best restaurant in the Middle East by Esquire magazine. The restaurant was ineligible for Michelin stars as the Michelin Guide did not cover the Middle East back then.
