= We Love TV =

- Genre: Game show
- Presented by: Gloria Hunniford
- Voices of: Robin Houston
- Composer: Laurie Holloway
- Country of origin: United Kingdom
- Original language: English
- No. of series: 3
- No. of episodes: 20

Production
- Running time: 30 minutes (inc. adverts)
- Production company: LWT

Original release
- Network: ITV
- Release: 14 September 1984 – 16 August 1986

We Love TV is a British game show that aired on ITV from 14 September 1984 to 16 August 1986 and is hosted by Gloria Hunniford.

== Transmissions ==
Series	Start date	End date	Episodes
1	14 September 1984	28 October 1984	7
2	30 August 1985	11 October 1985	7
3	12 July 1986	16 August 1986	6
