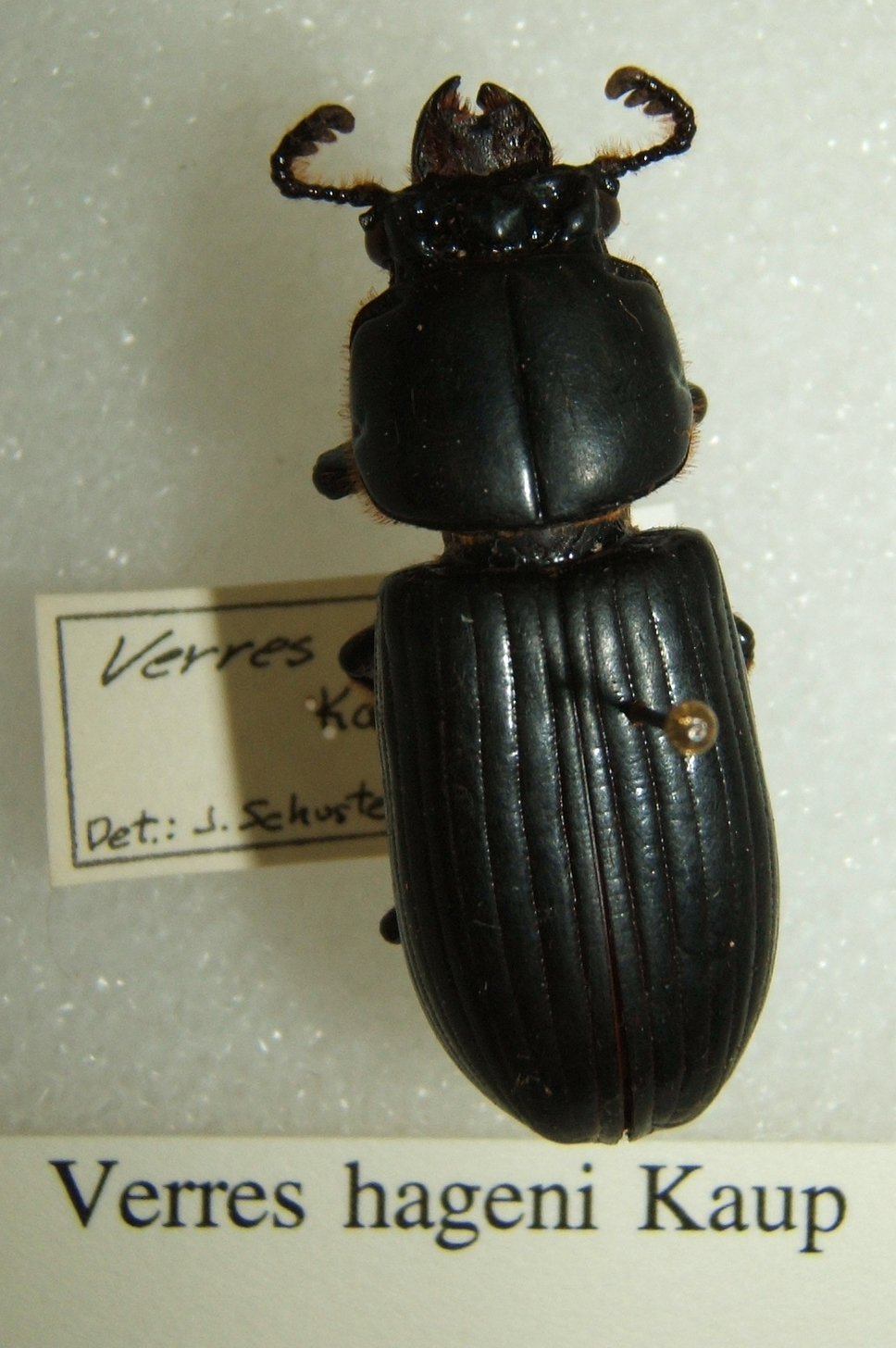
- Verres hageni, adult

Scientific classification
- Kingdom: Animalia
- Phylum: Arthropoda
- Class: Insecta
- Order: Coleoptera
- Suborder: Polyphaga
- Infraorder: Scarabaeiformia
- Family: Passalidae
- Genus: Verres
- Species: V. hageni

Binomial name
- Verres hageni Kaup, 1871

Subspecies
- Verres hageni muzoensis Hincks, 1950; Verres sternipunctatus Kuwert, 1891; Verres vernicatus Casey, 1897

= Verres hageni =

Species of beetle

Verres hageni is a species of beetle in the family Passalidae. It is found in Mexico, Central America, and Colombia.
