= Angela Hartnett =

English chef (born 1968)

Angela Hartnett OBE
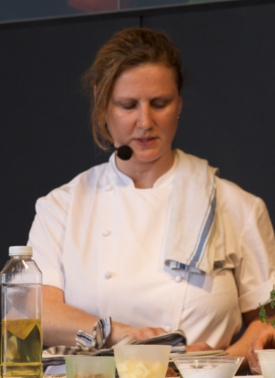
- Hartnett in 2009
- Born: Angela Maria Hartnett; September 1968 (age 58); Canterbury, Kent, England
- Education: Cambridge Polytechnic
- Spouse: Neil Borthwick
- Culinary career
- Cooking style: Italian
- Ratings
- Michelin stars AA Rosettes
- Current restaurants
- Murano (restaurant); Cafe Murano; Hartnett Holder & Co.
- Previous restaurants
- Merchant's Tavern; Angela Hartnett at the Connaught Hotel
- Television shows
- ITV1 Hell's Kitchen; BBC2 Kitchen Criminals; BBC2 Take on the Takeaway; BBC2 Great British Menu
- Awards
- Best Newcomer Award; Square Meal Guides' BMW Best New Restaurant

Angela Maria Hartnett OBE (born September 1968) is an English chef and television personality. A protégée of Gordon Ramsay, she was chef-patron at Angela Hartnett at the Connaught in London. Currently, she is chef-patron for Murano in Mayfair; Café Murano in Bermondsey, Covent Garden, Marylebone and St James's; and Cucina Angelina in Courchevel (France). In 2004, she gained her first Michelin star.

== Early life and education ==
Angela Hartnett was born in Kent to Patrick Hartnett, an Irish sailor in the Merchant Navy, and Giuliana Pesci, whose parents had migrated from Bardi in Emilia-Romagna to Ferndale in the Rhondda Valley, part of a substantial Welsh Italian community. Her father died when she was seven years old.

Hartnett's mother moved the young family (older brother and younger sister) to Upminster in Outer London to be closer to both sets of grandparents. Their Italian maternal grandmother cared for the children whilst Giuliana worked long hours as a dinner lady and nanny. At 18, Hartnett went to Italy for a year to work as an au pair before graduating with a degree in history at Cambridge Polytechnic.

== Career ==
Hartnett learned on the job at a hotel in Cambridge, then at the Sandy Lane Hotel restaurant in Barbados. In 1994, she returned to the UK, and undertook a one-day trial at Gordon Ramsay's first restaurant Aubergine. Alongside Marcus Wareing, she worked six days a week alongside Ramsay for longer than the two weeks Wareing predicted – Ramsay called her a bitch occasionally, alongside his favoured name for her: Dizzy Lizzy. She supported Ramsay at Zafferano and L'Oranger, then joining Wareing as his sous chef at Petrus. After launching Amaryllis in Scotland with David Dempsey in 2001, Hartnett helped with the launch of Verre in Dubai, Ramsay's first overseas restaurant.

In 2003, Hartnett got the 'Best Newcomer Award' and the SquareMeal Guides' BMW Best New Restaurant award for the two restaurants at the Connaught. In 2004, she gained her first Michelin star. In 2007, she opened Cielo, a Ramsay Group restaurant in Boca Raton. She made her first television appearance in the first series of ITV1's Hell's Kitchen. In 2015, Angela took part in the final episode, and oversaw the final task for MasterChef UK.

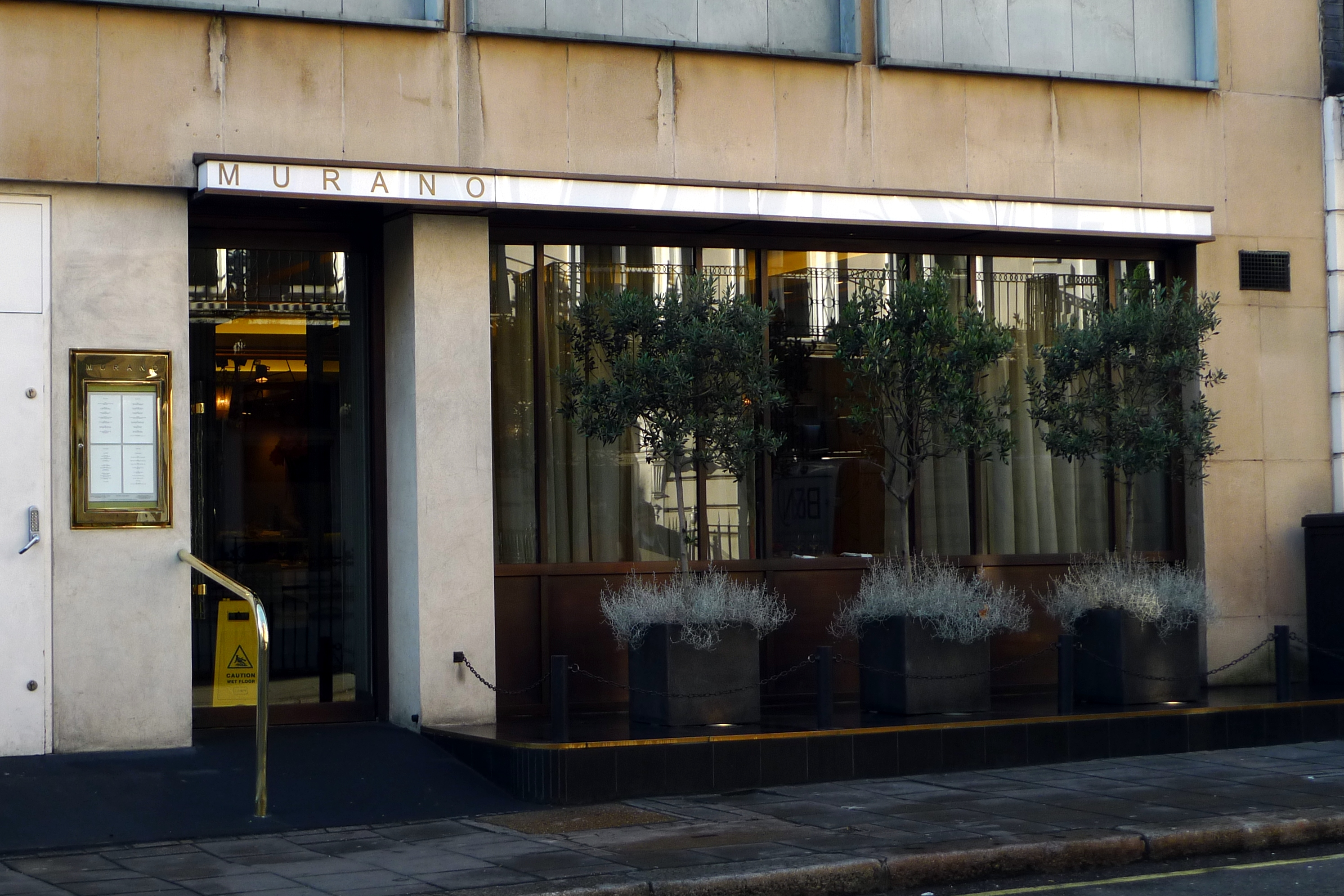
Murano in 2010

Just before the Connaught hotel closed for restoration in mid-2007, Hartnett published her first book, Cucina: Three Generations of Italian Family Cooking; while it was closed she was seen on BBC's Kitchen Criminals and Take on the Takeaway. Gordon Ramsay Holdings Ltd agreed to cease their contract with the Connaught Hotel in September 2007, and in August 2008 Hartnett launched Murano, a fine-dining Italian restaurant in Mayfair. Murano was awarded a Michelin star and four AA Rosettes. She created Cafe Murano, a more relaxed setting, in St James in November 2013 and a further site in Covent Garden in July 2015. She has since opened 2 more Cafe Muranos in Bermondsey and Marylebone. In 2013 she opened Merchant's Tavern in collaboration with Neil Borthwick and Canteen founders Dominic Lake and Patrick Clayton-Malone.

From January to March 2016, Hartnett presented Tomorrow’s Food alongside Dara Ó Briain, Chris Bavin and Dr Shini Somara. The BBC One show looks at the cutting-edge technologies and produce appearing in farms, supermarkets, kitchens and restaurants around the world, and how this is transforming the way we grow, buy and eat our food. In 2020, Hartnett joined Bavin and Mary Berry as a judge on the BBC One reality cooking show Best Home Cook, replacing series one judge Dan Doherty.

Hartnett was appointed Member of the Order of the British Empire (MBE) in the 2007 New Year Honours for services to the hospitality industry and Officer of the Order of the British Empire (OBE) in the 2022 New Year Honours for services to the hospitality industry and to the National Health Service during the COVID-19 response.

For some years she has been a judge for the BBC Food and Farming Awards. One of her fellow judges, journalist Sheila Dillon, profiled her in "A Life Through Food" on The Food Programme in January 2022. In 2018 Hartnett was profiled in Maya Gallus's documentary The Heat: A Kitchen (R)evolution. In 2022, Hartnett launched the podcast Dish with television and radio presenter Nick Grimshaw in partnership with Waitrose.

The third Cafe Murano location opened in Bermondsey in 2019 and a fourth Cafe Murano location opened in Marylebone in 2025.

== Personal life ==
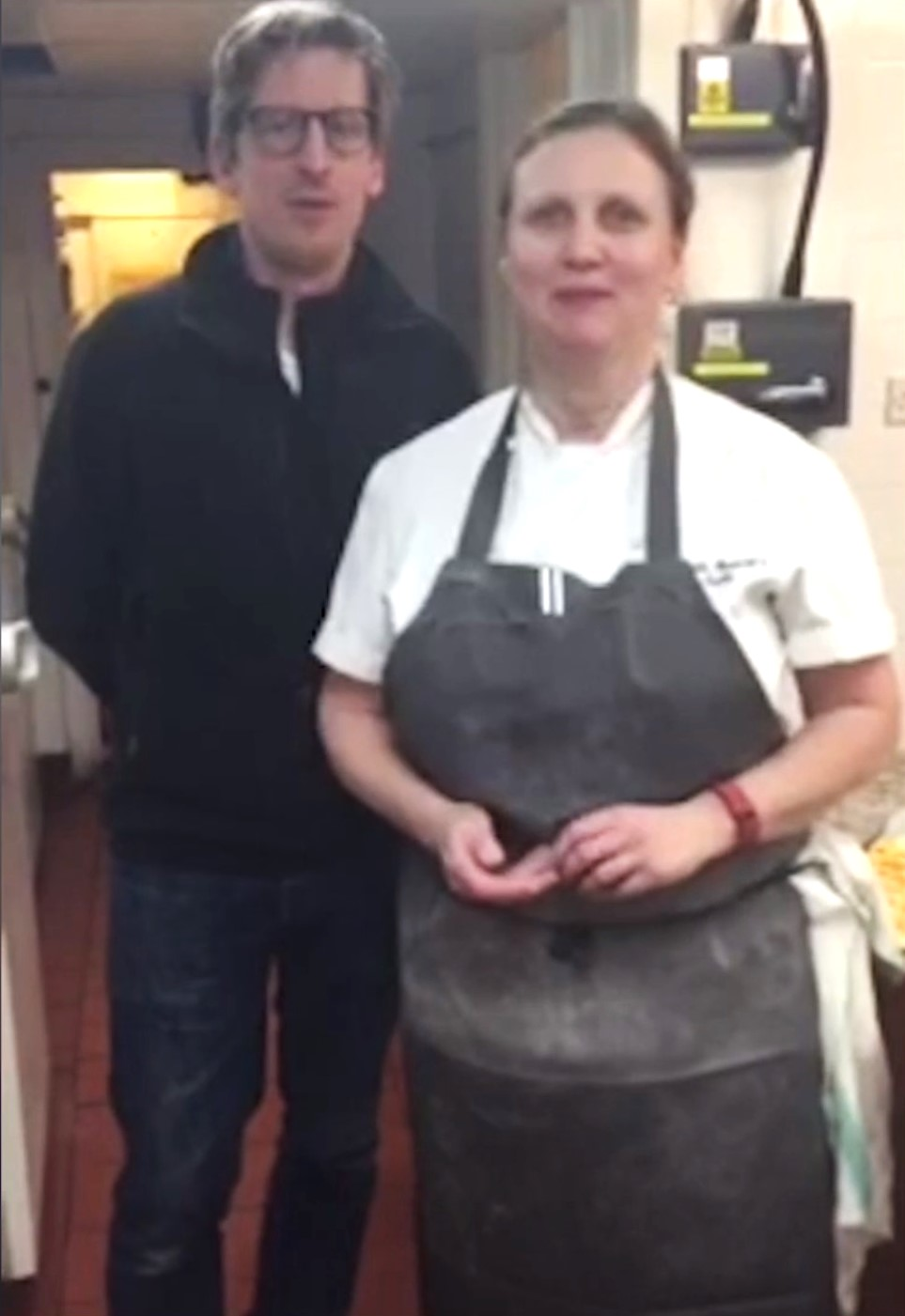
Hartnett with her husband, Neil Borthwick, in 2016

Hartnett is married to Neil Borthwick, head chef of Hartnett's restaurant Merchant's Tavern and former sous-chef of Phil Howard's Michelin-starred The Square, and lives in Spitalfields with her sister, in a house owned by Hartnett and her brother. She owned a Jack Russell called Alfie that she rescued from Battersea Dogs Home in 2007, and also has a beagle named Otis that was previously owned by her sister Anne. She spends a holiday every year in Bardi, the town from where most of the Welsh-based Italian families can trace their roots.
