= Murano (restaurant) =

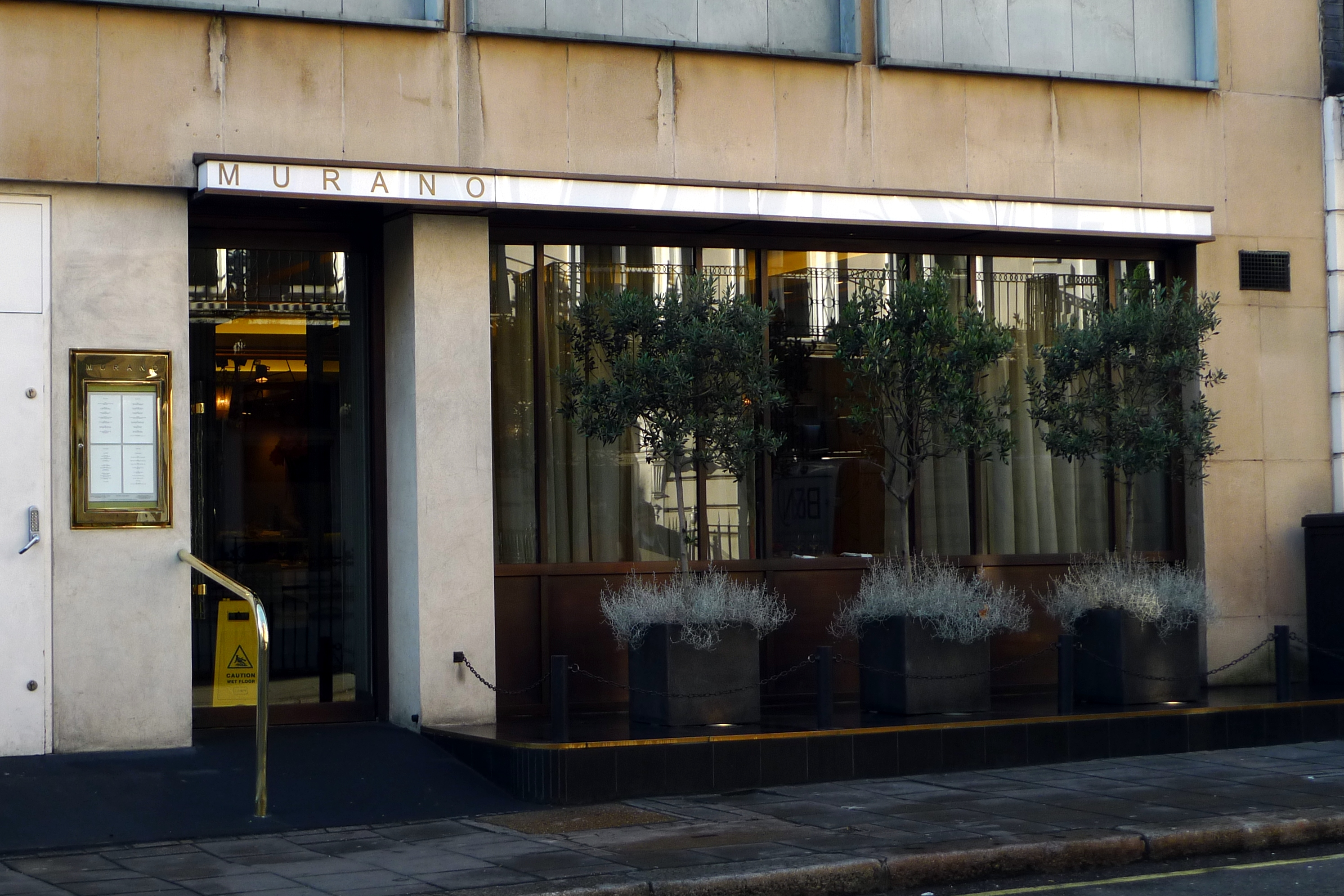
- The restaurant in 2010
- Interactive map of Murano

Restaurant information
- Established: August 2008; 18 years ago
- Owner: Angela Hartnett
- Food type: Italian
- Dress code: Relaxed/smart-casual
- Rating: (Michelin Guide); AA Rosettes
- Location: 20 Queen Street, Mayfair, London, W1J 5PP, United Kingdom
- Coordinates: 51°30′26″N 0°8′50″W
- Reservations: Yes
- Other information: Nearest station: Green Park
- Website: www.muranolondon.com

Murano is a restaurant situated in London, England. It was opened in August 2008 by chefs Angela Hartnett and Gordon Ramsay. Murano was purchased outright from Ramsay by head chef Hartnett with the handover taking place in October 2010. It was awarded one Michelin star in 2009, which has been retained ever since.

== Description ==
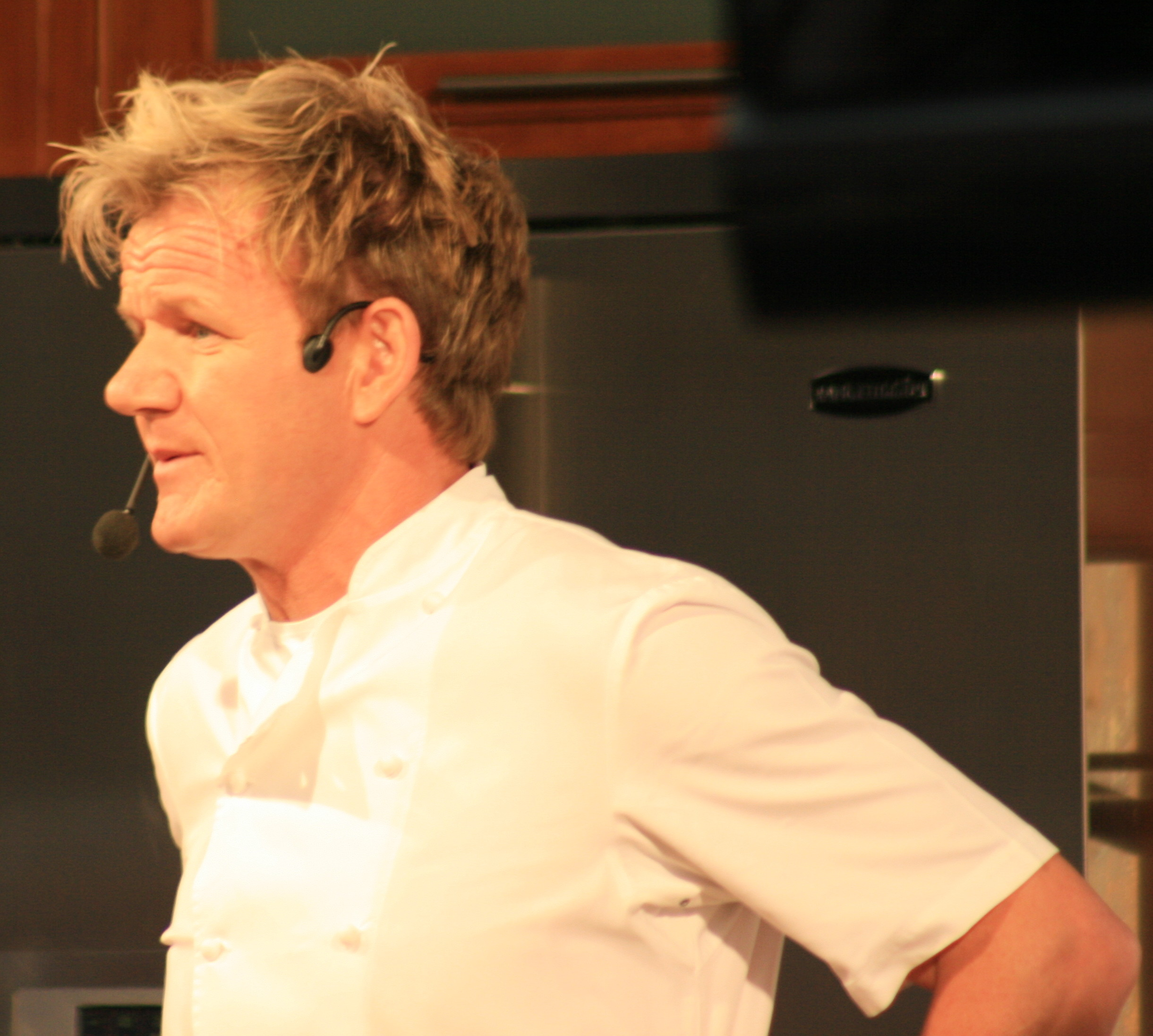
Ramsay in 2008

The restaurant is located on 20 Queen Street, Mayfair, London, next door to an Indian restaurant, Tamarind of London, which had previously held a Michelin star. Murano was opened in August 2008 by Gordon Ramsay and Angela Hartnett. The cuisine style of the restaurant is largely Italian. Hartnett purchased Murano from Ramsay with the handover taking place on 8 October 2010.

== Reception ==
In January 2009, the Michelin Guide awarded the restaurant one star. The star has been retained ever since then. In an October 2008 review, Matthew Norman of The Guardian lauded Murano's "superb" staff service and its "majestic" food. Jasper Gerard of The Telegraph paid Murano a visit in September 2008, praising the quality of the food and giving it a score of 8.5 out of 10. After sampling a few dishes at the restaurant, Zoe Williams of The Telegraph commented that "Murano proves the chauvanists wrong. Women can - and do - cook to the highest level." A reviewer for the magazine Time Out wrote in an October 2012 review that she enjoyed the restaurant's "perfectly proportioned" crab tortelli, rating Murano with four out of five stars. On Murano's interior design, she wrote, "Plump upholstery, crisp linens and warm leather ensure a sumptuous, serene setting for a meal that draws as much on French fine dining as Italian staples."

== See also ==
- List of Italian restaurants
