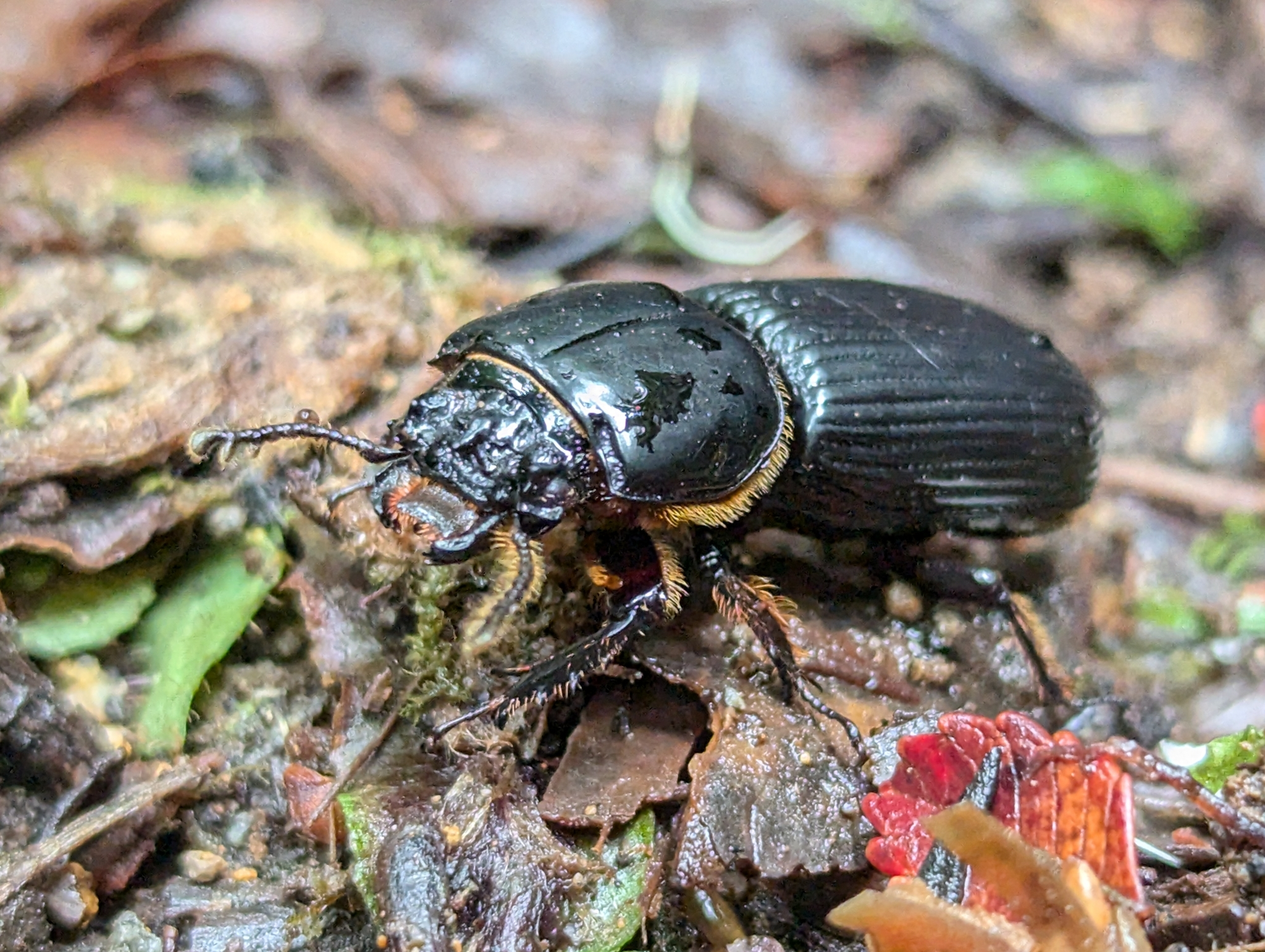
- Verres, Costa Rica

Scientific classification
- Domain: Eukaryota
- Kingdom: Animalia
- Phylum: Arthropoda
- Class: Insecta
- Order: Coleoptera
- Suborder: Polyphaga
- Infraorder: Scarabaeiformia
- Family: Passalidae
- Subfamily: Passalinae
- Tribe: Proculini
- Genus: Verres; Kaup, 1871

Synonyms
- Neoverres Hincks, 1934; Platyverres Bates, 1886; Verroides Kuwert, 1891

= Verres (beetle) =

Genus of beetles

Verres is a genus of beetles in the family Passalidae. There are about 11 described species in Verres. They are found in Mexico, Central and South America.

== Species ==
These 11 species belong to the genus Verres:

- Verres cavicollis Bates, 1886 (Costa Rica, Ecuador, Guatemala, Honduras, Mexico, Panama)
- Verres cavifrons Kuwert, 1891 (Panama)
- Verres corticicola (Truqui, 1857) (Colombia, Costa Rica, Guatemala, Honduras, Mexico, Nicaragua)
- Verres deficiens Kuwert, 1891 (Costa Rica)
- Verres furcilabris (Eschscholtz, 1828) (Central and South America)
- Verres hageni Kaup, 1871 (Mexico, Central and South America)
- Verres intermedius (Kaup, 1868) (Mexico)
- Verres longicornis (Luederwaldt, 1934) (Costa Rica)
- Verres onorei Boucher & Pardo-Locarno, 1997 (Colombia, Ecuador)
- Verres schoolmeestersi Pardo-Locarno, 2014 (Colombia)
- Verres sternbergianus Zang, 1905 (Colombia, Costa Rica, Ecuador, Panama, Venezuela)
