= The Berkeley =

Hotel in Knightsbridge, London

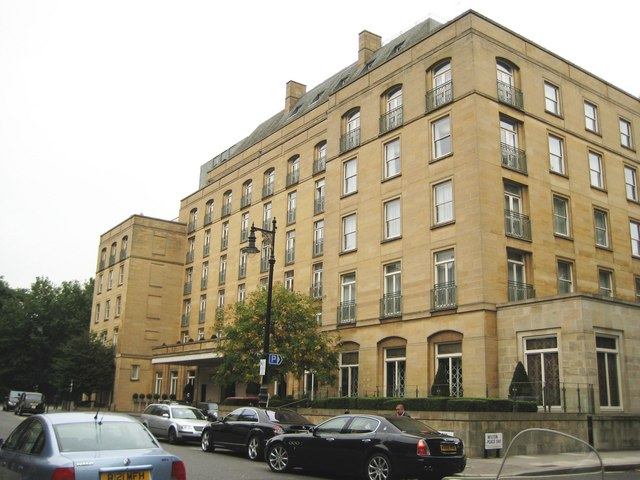

General information
- Type: Luxury hotel
- Location: Wilton Place, Knightsbridge, London, England
- Coordinates: 51°30′7.2″N 0°9′21.96″W
- Opened: 1972; 54 years ago
- Owner: Maybourne Hotel Group
- Affiliation: The Walpole Committee

Design and construction
- Architect: Brian O'Rorke

Website
- the-berkeley.co.uk

The Berkeley is a 5-star luxury hotel located at Wilton Place in Knightsbridge, London. The hotel is owned and managed by the Maybourne Hotel Group, which also owns The Connaught and Claridge's in Mayfair, London.

== History ==
=== 1800s and early 1900s ===
Originally located on the corner of Piccadilly and Berkeley Street, the Gloucester coffee house was used as the base for drivers of mail coaches travelling to the West Country. As a result, it started to expand and became a hotel for travellers both to and from London who were travelling on the mail coach services. In 1897, with the coming of the railways, the building was formally renamed the Berkeley Hotel, a location trusted by the parents of debutantes to keep an eye on the reputation of their daughters.

In 1900, Richard D'Oyly Carte bought the hotel, and his family remained in control for the next century. From June 1915 to July 1916 Ugo Ciocca was the Maitre d'hotel in the Berkeley Hotel Grill-room. In the 1920s the Berkeley became one of the first London hotels with air conditioning, and in the 1930s double glazing. Ferraro, the maitre d'hotel of the Berkeley Grill, was a fixture of London nightlife in the 1920s and 1930s and appears in several novels of the period, such as Dennis Wheatley's Three Inquisitive People, written 1932 but not published till 1940. He also is mentioned in P. G. Wodehouse's 1931 novel, Big Money, some of which takes place at the Berkeley. Ian Stewart became bandleader in 1946.

=== Late 1900s and 2000s ===
In 1972, the hotel moved to a new building designed by British architect Brian O'Rorke on Wilton Place, Knightsbridge. Incorporating restored features from the original building, it was also unique in that it was London's only hotel with a rooftop swimming pool until well into the 21st century. The Berkeley's top floor, its seventh, also housed its Bamford Haybarn Spa, which debuted in 2013.

During the 1980s, Madame Somoza became a frequent customer at the restaurant, and even Queen Elizabeth II used to lunch there with friends.

In the winter months, the Health Club & Spa transformed its rooftop terrace into a pine-filled forest cinema. Hotel guests and visitors alike were treated to winter classics on the big screen while nestling between warm down-feather Moncler blankets and hot water bottles.

In 1998, the Savoy Group was sold to Blackstone Group and Colony Capital. In April 2004, the Savoy Group, including the Berkeley, was sold to a group of Irish investors led by Derek Quinlan. In January 2005, the group was renamed Maybourne, a separate management company, which retained the Berkeley, Claridge's and the Connaught.

In 2016, Rogers Stirk Harbour + Partners, led by Richard Rogers, completed a new entrance for the hotel, the practice's first hotel project. The entrance features a glass canopy supported by sixteen nine-metre carbon-fibre beams, with glass pavilions on either side. The practice said it used materials and techniques more commonly found in Formula One cars and racing bicycles.

== Restaurants and bars ==
In 1998, Pierre Koffmann moved his Michelin starred "La Tante Claire" from the area of Chelsea to the hotel, serving his signature dish of pig's trotter stuffed with morel mushrooms. The original Chelsea site was taken over by Gordon Ramsay, who opened the signature Restaurant Gordon Ramsay there. Replaced at the hotel in 2003 by the Gordon Ramsay-run "Boxwood Café", after its closure Koffmann returned in April 2010 to open the signature "Koffmann's" restaurant at the hotel. Koffmann's at The Berkeley closed on 31 December 2016.

Marcus Wareing headed the Michelin 1 star-rated "Marcus", until it closed permanently on 26 December 2023.

The Collins Room, which has been described as "elegant but unfussy", serves afternoon teas, and, in particular, is home to Prêt-à-Portea cakes and pastries inspired by the latest collections of leading fashion houses. Prêt-à-Portea specialty items change every six months to reflect the changes of seasons; the designer brands they commemorate may include such labels as Hermès, Loewe or Kenzo. The afternoon tea menus also feature various savoury items, and an extensive tea list. The room has since closed, and its space was taken over by La Môme London.

The Blue Bar was designed by Dublin architect David Collins, and was decorated entirely in Lutyens Blue, a colour he created in honour of Edwin Lutyens. Two compilation albums of music played in the bar were released through Warner: The Blue Bar, featuring a mix of ambient techno and electronica, and Blue Bar, Vol. 2.

In July 2019, the hotel opened a second bar, the Berkeley Bar and Terrace, with an outdoor terrace overlooking St Paul's Church.

In February 2022, Cédric Grolet opened a patisserie at the hotel, next to the Berkeley Café.

In February 2025, La Môme London opened at the hotel, in the space previously occupied by Marcus and the Collins Room. It is a branch of the Cannes restaurant La Môme, run by the French restaurateurs Ugo and Antoine Lecorché.

The hotel includes the Berkeley Rooftop Pool and Bar.
