= Reid baronets of Ellon =

Escutcheon of the Reid baronets of Ellon

The Reid baronetcy, of Ellon in the County of Aberdeen, was created in the Baronetage of the United Kingdom on 28 August 1897 for James Reid. He was physician to Queen Victoria and Kings Edward VII and George V.

== Reid baronets, of Ellon (1897) ==
- Sir James Reid, 1st Baronet (1849–1923)
- Sir Edward Reid, 2nd Baronet (1901–1972)
- Sir Alexander Reid, 3rd Baronet (1932–2019)
- Sir Charles Edward James Reid, 4th Baronet (born 1956)

The heir apparent is the present holder's only son Marcus James Reid (born 1994).

== Notes ==
Baronetage of the United Kingdom
Preceded by Faudel-Phillips baronets	Reid baronets of Ellon; 28 August 1897	Succeeded by Maple baronets
