= The Connaught (hotel) =

Luxury hotel in London

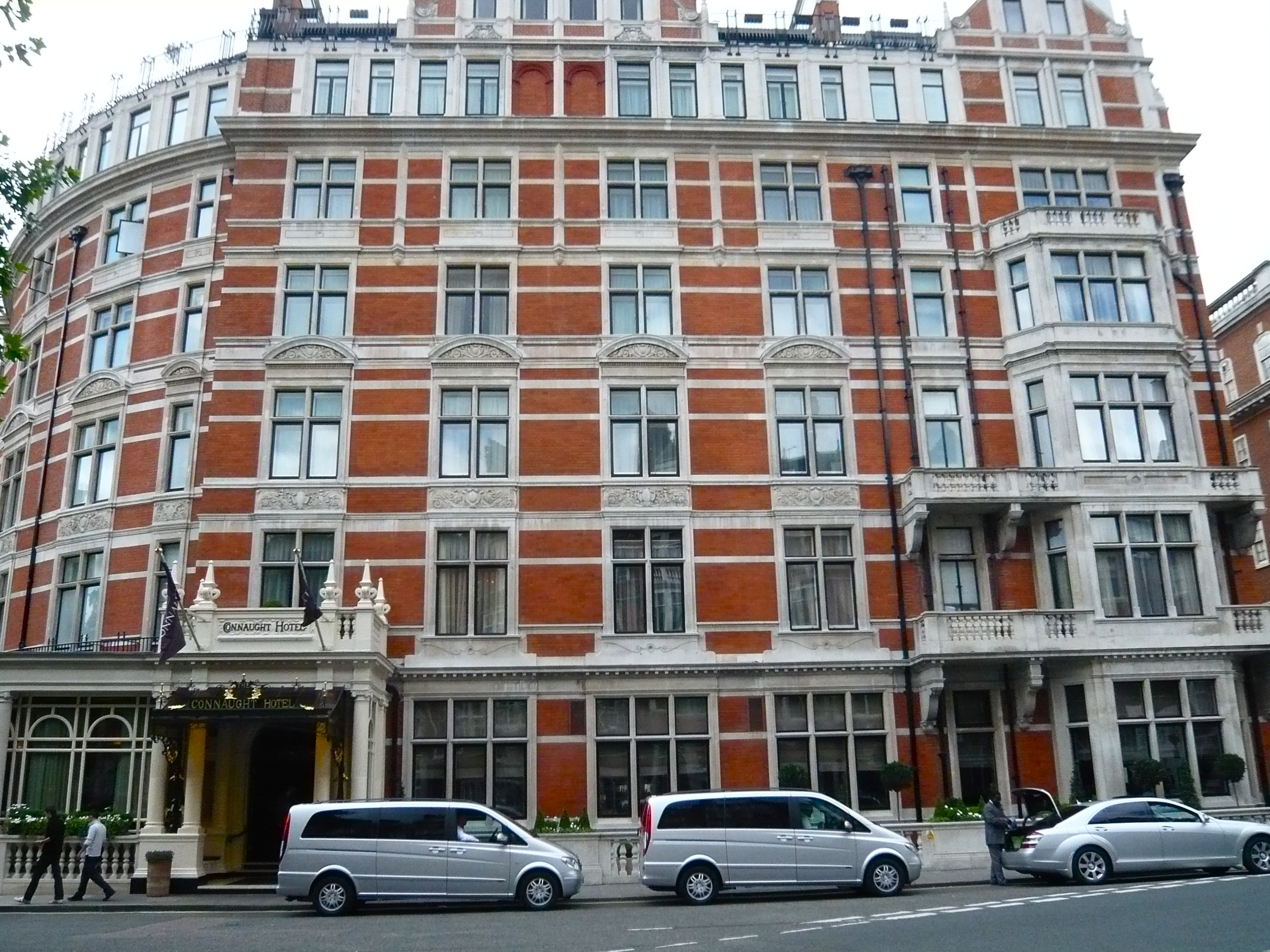

General information
- Type: Luxury hotel
- Location: Carlos Place, Mayfair, London, England
- Coordinates: 51°30′36″N 0°08′59″W
- Named for: The Duke of Connaught
- Opened: 1815 (original building); 1897 (current building)
- Owner: Maybourne Hotel Group
- Affiliation: The Walpole Committee

Technical details
- Floor count: 6

Other information
- Number of rooms: 121
- Number of restaurants: 3
- Number of bars: 3
- Parking: yes

Website
- the-connaught.co.uk

The Connaught is a five-star luxury hotel located on the corner of Carlos Place and Mount Street in Mayfair, London. Established in the early 19th century, it has changed hands several times. The hotel is currently owned and managed by the Maybourne Hotel Group.

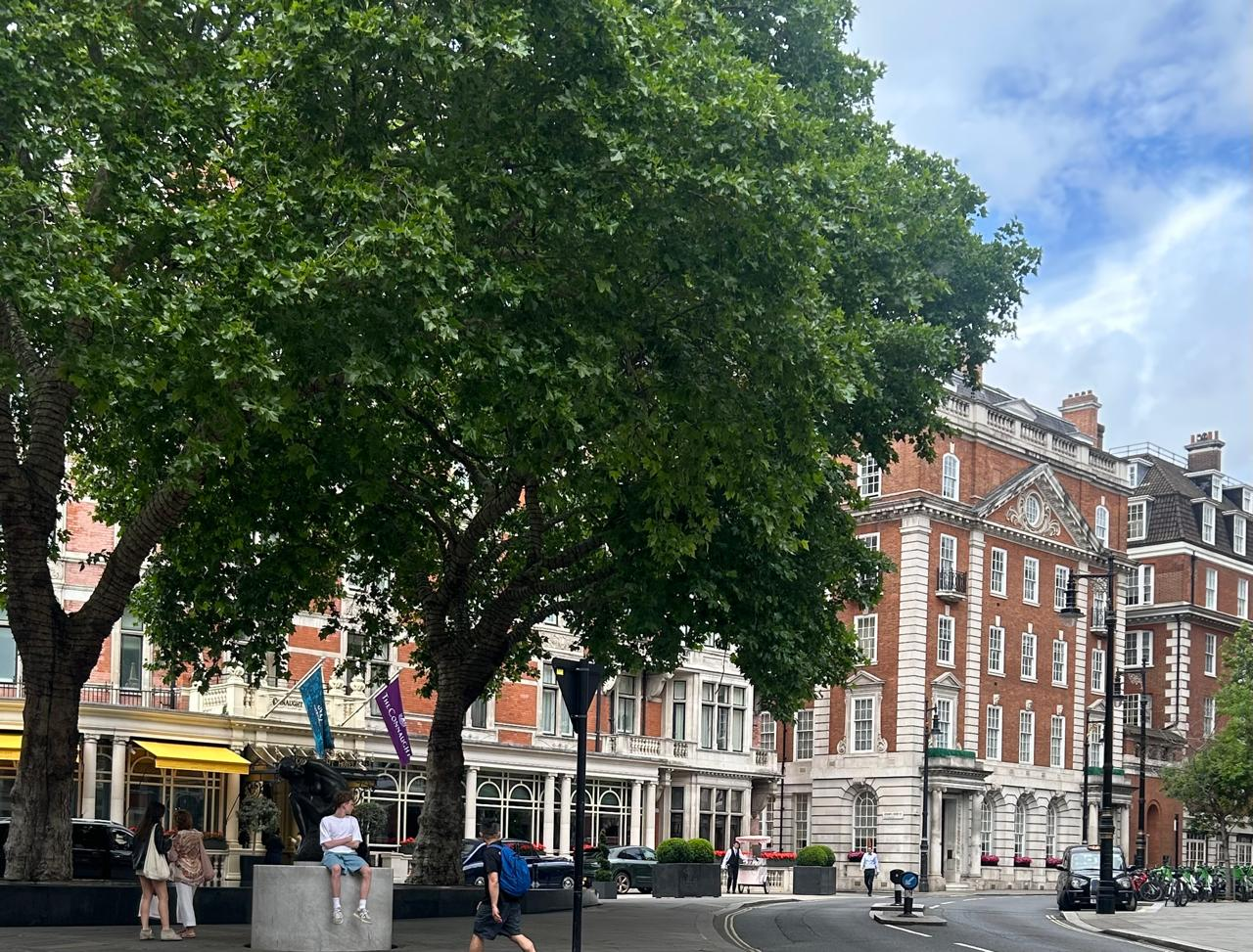
Connaught Hotel and Mayfair House in front of Tadao Ando's fountain Silence

== History ==
The hotel first opened in 1815 as the Prince of Saxe-Coburg Hotel, an offshoot of Grillion's Hotel that had been established by Alexander Grillion in Albemarle Street, Mayfair. It was originally a pair of Georgian houses in Charles Street, near Grosvenor Square. The 1st Duke of Westminster decided to redevelop the area, and the street was changed, becoming Carlos Place. In 1892, the hotel's owner applied to rebuild it, but work did not start until two years later, when the original houses were demolished.

In 1897, the Coburg Hotel was reopened. In 1917, during the First World War, a decision was made to change the name to the less-German "Connaught". The name was taken from the title of Queen Victoria's third son, Prince Arthur, the first Duke of Connaught.

In 1935, Rudolph Richard, a young Swiss hotelier, became general manager of The Connaught and ran the hotel almost as an English private house, with the highest standards of comfort and service. In 1956, The Connaught was acquired by the Savoy Group, owners of Claridge's, The Berkeley and the Savoy Hotel in London. In 1998, the Savoy Group was sold to Blackstone Group and Colony Capital.

In April 2004, the Savoy Group, including The Connaught, was sold to a group of Irish investors led by Derek Quinlan. In January 2005, the group was renamed Maybourne, a separate management company, which retained The Berkeley, Claridge's and The Connaught.

=== Restoration ===
In March 2007, The Connaught closed for a £70 million restoration programme, described as a "contemporary interpretation". Guy Oliver was the lead designer of the restoration, refurbishment and redecoration of the old hotel, completing a total of 88 rooms and suites (including The Prince's Lodge, The Eagles Lodge and The Sutherland and Somerset Suites) as well as the restoration and redecoration of the main staircase, new lifts, concierge and public areas, L'Espelette Restaurant and The Georgian and Regency Rooms. Immediately after this work was completed he designed a further 31 rooms and suites in the new addition to the hotel, a terrace penthouse, and all of the public spaces and function rooms, including the Ballroom, Maple Oak and Silver Rooms. The Maybourne Hotel Group stated that they intended to preserve the traditional values for which the hotel is known. The chef was Angela Hartnett, but she was later replaced by French chef Hélène Darroze.

The hotel reopened in December 2007 with fewer rooms than usually available; development continued throughout 2008 when The Connaught Bar, designed by David Collins, opened. The hotel also has a swimming pool and Asian-inspired spa managed in conjunction with Aman Resorts. Other changes included a new Espelette Restaurant, with a covered terrace, which was replaced by Jean-Georges at The Connaught in 2017, and the Coburg Bar, then managed by Andreas Cortes, who later became the hotel's director of food and beverage.

== Design features ==
The current building was designed by Lewis Isaacs and Henry L. Florence and built between 1894 and 1896. The Connaught Hotel is a Grade II listed building on the National Heritage List for England. Together with Grosvenor Group , the Connaught commissioned a water feature called Silence, designed by Tadao Ando. It is installed outside the hotel in Mount Street.

=== Restaurants and bars ===
In 2017, Jean-Georges Vongerichten opened Jean-Georges at The Connaught. First opened in 1955, the Connaught Grill reopened in 2020, also overseen by Vongerichten. As of 2023, the Connaught Grill’s executive chef is Ramiro Lafuente Martinez.

In 2021, Hélène Darroze at The Connaught was awarded three Michelin stars in the Michelin Guide Great Britain and Ireland, and retained them each year from 2022 to 2026.

In October 2020, the hotel opened a patisserie on Mount Street, selling cakes made by executive pastry chef Nicolas Rouzaud and his team; it was renamed Nicolas Rouzaud at The Connaught in 2025.

The Connaught Bar is run by mixologist Agostino Perrone, and has received several international awards including World’s Best Cocktail Bar at the coveted Tales of the Cocktail Spirited Awards in both 2012 and 2016, the only bar in the world to have won it twice. It was named the world’s best bar in The World’s 50 Best Bars in 2020 and 2021, and placed fifth on the list in 2023. In 2026, it was ranked 8th on the list, and 10th on the inaugural Europe’s 50 Best Bars list, which also named it the best bar in the UK.

In 2021, The Connaught opened a new bar, the Red Room, featuring artwork by Louise Bourgeois and Jenny Holzer, and stained-glass windows by Brian Clarke. The hotel also has a cigar lounge, The Connaught Cigar Merchants, located behind the Red Room.

== Notable guests ==
The Connaught has hosted guests such as Edward VII, Charles de Gaulle, U.S. Admiral Alan G. Kirk, Princess Grace of Monaco, Cecil Beaton, Cary Grant, David Niven, Lauren Bacall, Eric Clapton, Jack Nicholson and Ralph Lauren. The hotel was a particular favourite of actor Sir Alec Guinness, who from the 1970s until shortly before his death in 2000 would often stay at the Connaught when working in London. A suite was always at his disposal and he would often entertain friends in the Grill or in a private dining room.

== Gallery ==
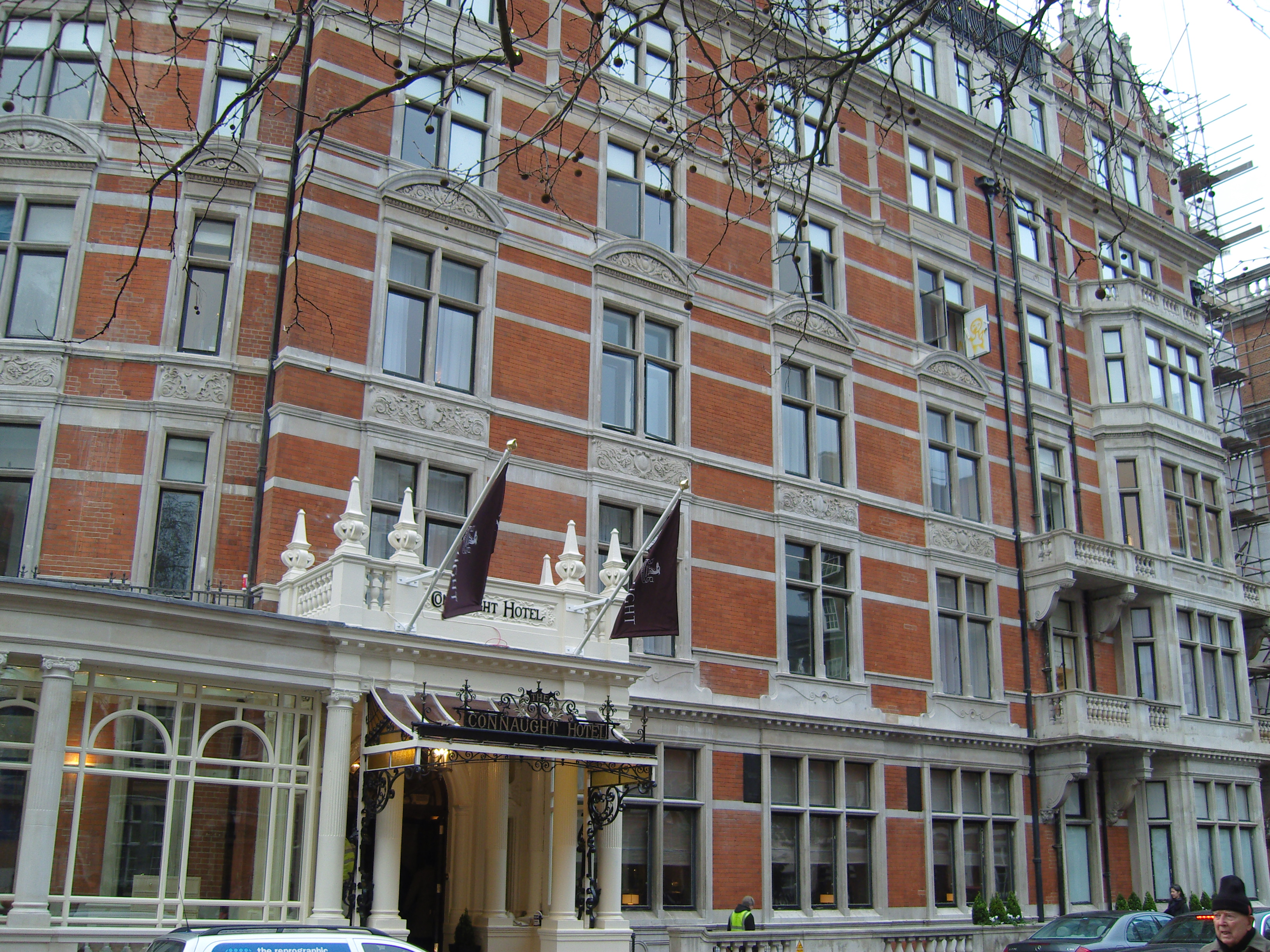
The Connaught in 2008

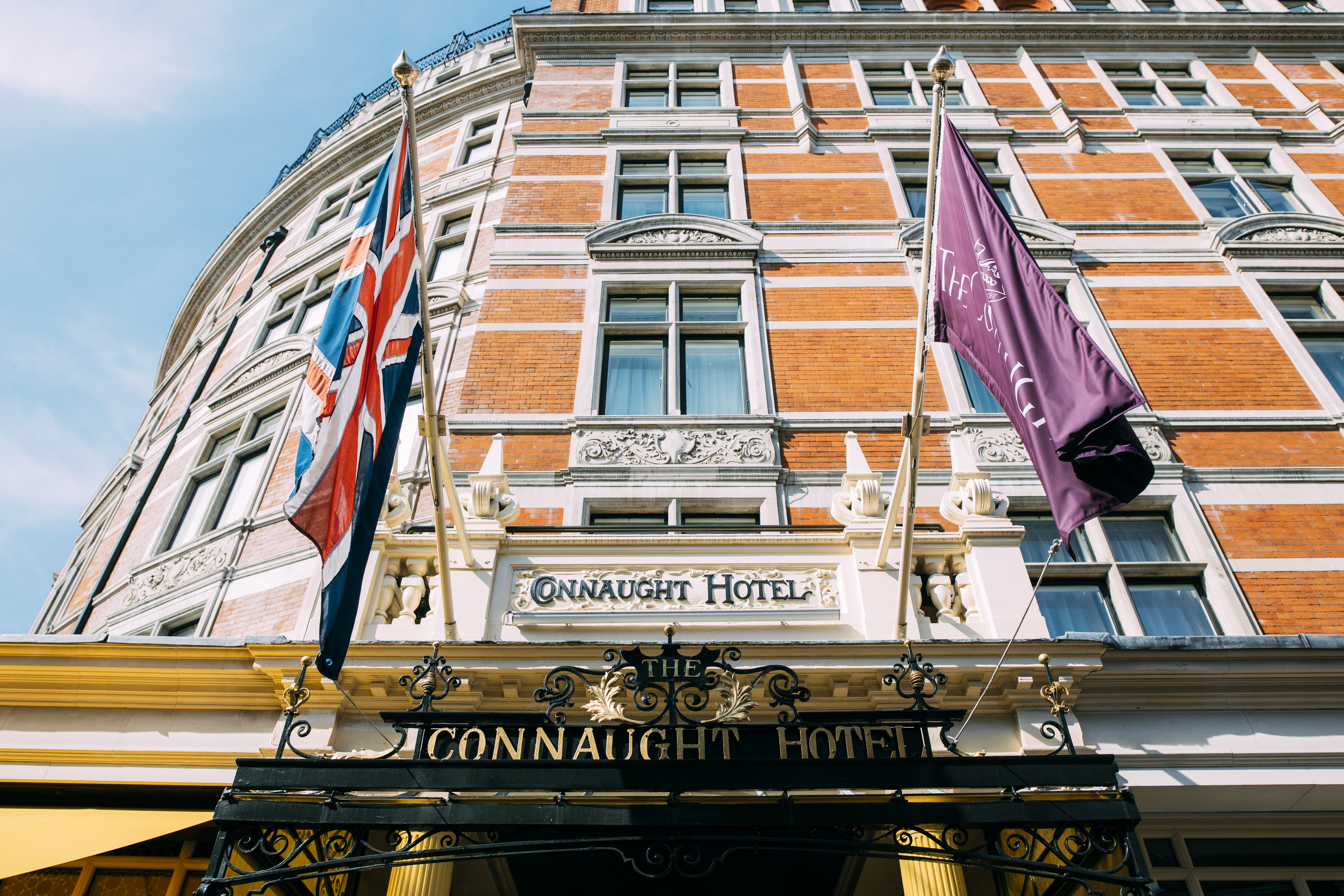
The entrance in 2019
