= Savoir =

Savoir might refer to:

- Savoir Adore, American musical group
- Va savoir, French film
- Savoir Beds, British luxury bed company
- "Savoir aimer", French song
- Alfred Savoir, French playwright
- Savoir Flair, fashion magazine
- Savoir Media, French media company
- Savoir, the Family History
- Savoir (Emily in Paris), fictional company in Emily in Paris

== See also ==
- Savoir faire (disambiguation), French phase
