= Faudel-Phillips baronets =

Title in the Baronetage of the United Kingdom

The coat of arms of the Faudel-Phillips of Grosvenor Gardens and Queen's Gardens, Baronets.

The Faudel-Phillips Baronetcy, of Grosvenor Gardens in the Parish of St George Hanover Square in the County of London and of Queen's Gardens, West Brighton, in the County of Sussex, was a title in the Baronetage of the United Kingdom. It was created on 27 August 1897 for George Faudel-Phillips, Sheriff of London and Middlesex between 1884 and 1885, High Sheriff of the County of London between 1895 and 1896 and Lord Mayor of London between 1896 and 1897. Born George Phillips, he had assumed the additional surname of Faudel, which was that of his maternal uncle. His father Sir Benjamin Samuel Phillips had been Lord Mayor of London between 1865 and 1866. The title became extinct on the death of the 3rd Baronet in 1941. Their families were Jewish emigrants from Germany, Poland, and possibly other countries, and had settled in England in the 1700s and 1800s. The family seat was Balls Park, Hertfordshire. All three holders of the title served as High Sheriff of Hertfordshire.

== Faudel-Phillips baronets, of Grosvenor Gardens and Queen's Gardens (1897) ==
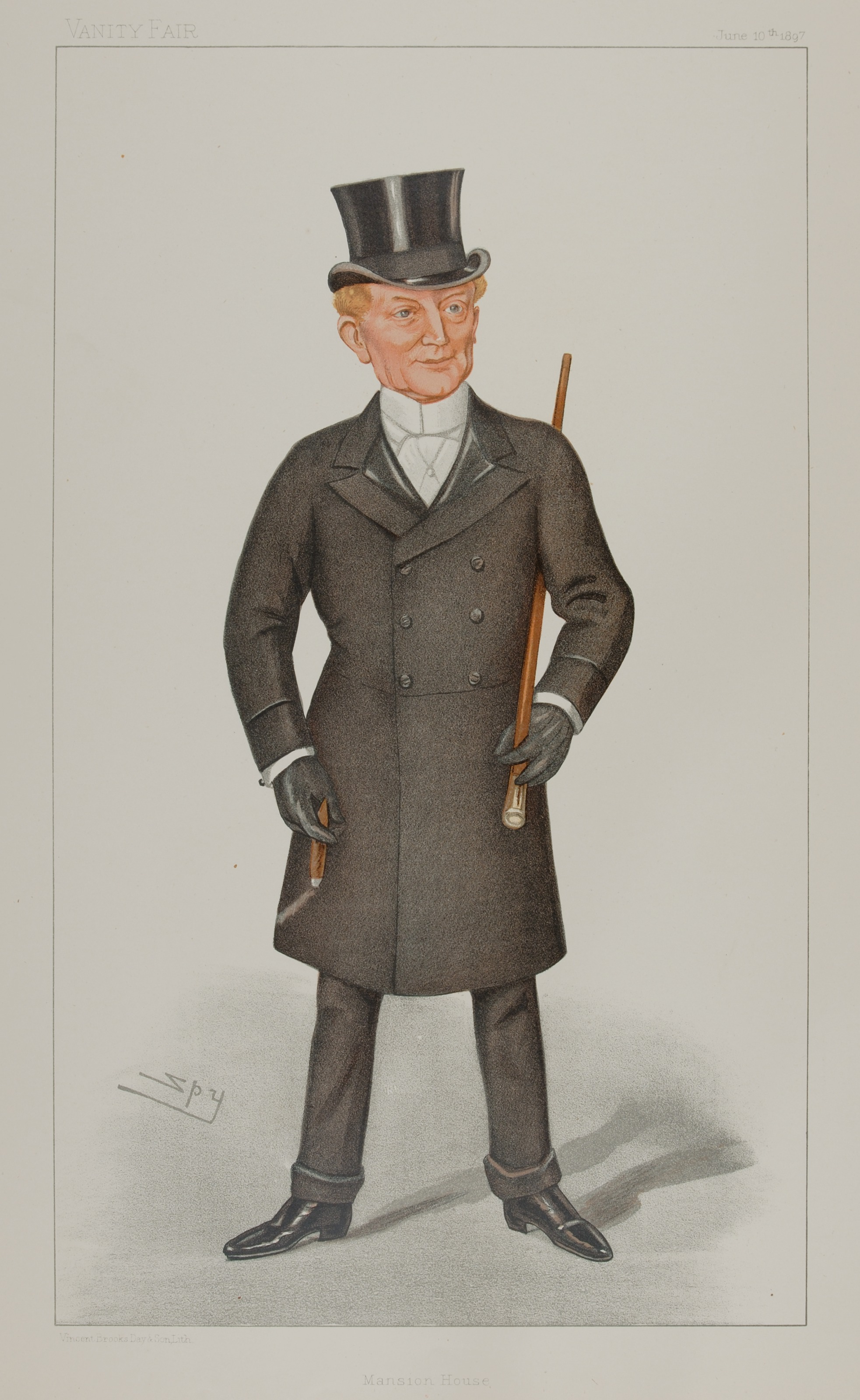
Sir George Faudel-Phillips, Bt, Vanity Fair caricature, 1897, by Leslie Ward ("Spy")

- Sir George Faudel Faudel-Phillips, GCIE, 1st Baronet (1840–1922), married to Helen Levy, a daughter of Joseph Moses Levy
- Sir Benjamin Samuel Faudel-Phillips, 2nd Baronet (1871–1927)
- Sir Lionel Lawson Faudel Faudel-Phillips, 3rd Baronet (1877–1941), married to Armyne Evelyn Gordon, daughter of Lord Granville Armyne Gordon (14 June 1856 – 14 June 1907), son of Charles Gordon, 10th Marquess of Huntly, Chief of Clan Gordon.

Baronetage of the United Kingdom
Preceded by Wilson baronets	Faudel-Phillips baronets of Grosvenor Gardens and Queen's Gardens; 27 August 1897	Succeeded by Reid baronets
