= Sir Alexander Reid, 3rd Baronet =

Sir Alexander James Reid, 3rd Baronet, DL, JP (6 December 1932 – 8 April 2019) was High Sheriff of Cambridgeshire from 1987 to 1988.

== Life ==
He was born on 6 December 1932 and educated at Eton and Magdalene College, Cambridge. He served in Malaya with the Gordon Highlanders and was Captain of the 3rd Battalion (TA) until 1964.

== Family ==
He married Michaela Kier on 15 October 1955; they had one son (the heir, Charles Edward James Reid, born 24 June 1956) and three daughters.

== Other ==
A Director of Ellon Castle Estates from 1965 to 1996, he was also Chairman of Governors at Heath Mount School from 1976 to 1992.

== See also ==
Baronetage of the United Kingdom
Preceded by Edward Reid	Baronet (of Ellon); 1972–2019	Succeeded by Charles Edward James Reid
