= Sir Edward Reid, 2nd Baronet =

British merchant banker

Sir Edward James Reid, 2nd Baronet, KBE (20 April 1901 – 23 February 1972) was a British merchant banker.

Reid was born in London on 20 April 1901, the son of Sir James Reid, 1st Baronet, physician at the royal court, by his wife Honourable Susan Baring, daughter of Edward Charles Baring, 1st Baron Revelstoke. Edward VII stood as sponsor at his baptism in May 1901, and he was Page of Honour to George V between 1911 and 1917. He was educated at Eton and King's College, Cambridge, and succeeded his father as second baronet in 1923.

Joining his mother's family firm of Baring Brothers in 1922, he rose to become a director in 1926 and partner in 1928. During his career his German connections meant he played significant roles in a number of banking negotiations both pre- and post- World War II. He was Chairman of the Accepting Houses Committee (1946–1966), Chairman of the British Banking Committee for German Affairs (1948–1962), and President of the Institute of Bankers (1962–1964). He retired from Barings in 1966 as senior partner.

He worked for the War Office during World War II, and wrote a report in 1945 for MI5 regarding the German production of fake British bank notes.

He was appointed an Officer of the Order of the British Empire 1947, promoted to Knight Commander in 1967. He died on 23 February 1972.

Baronetage of the United Kingdom
Preceded by James Reid	Baronet (of Ellon); 1923–1972	Succeeded by Alexander James Reid
