= St Paul's Church, Knightsbridge =

Church in Greater London, England

St Paul's Church
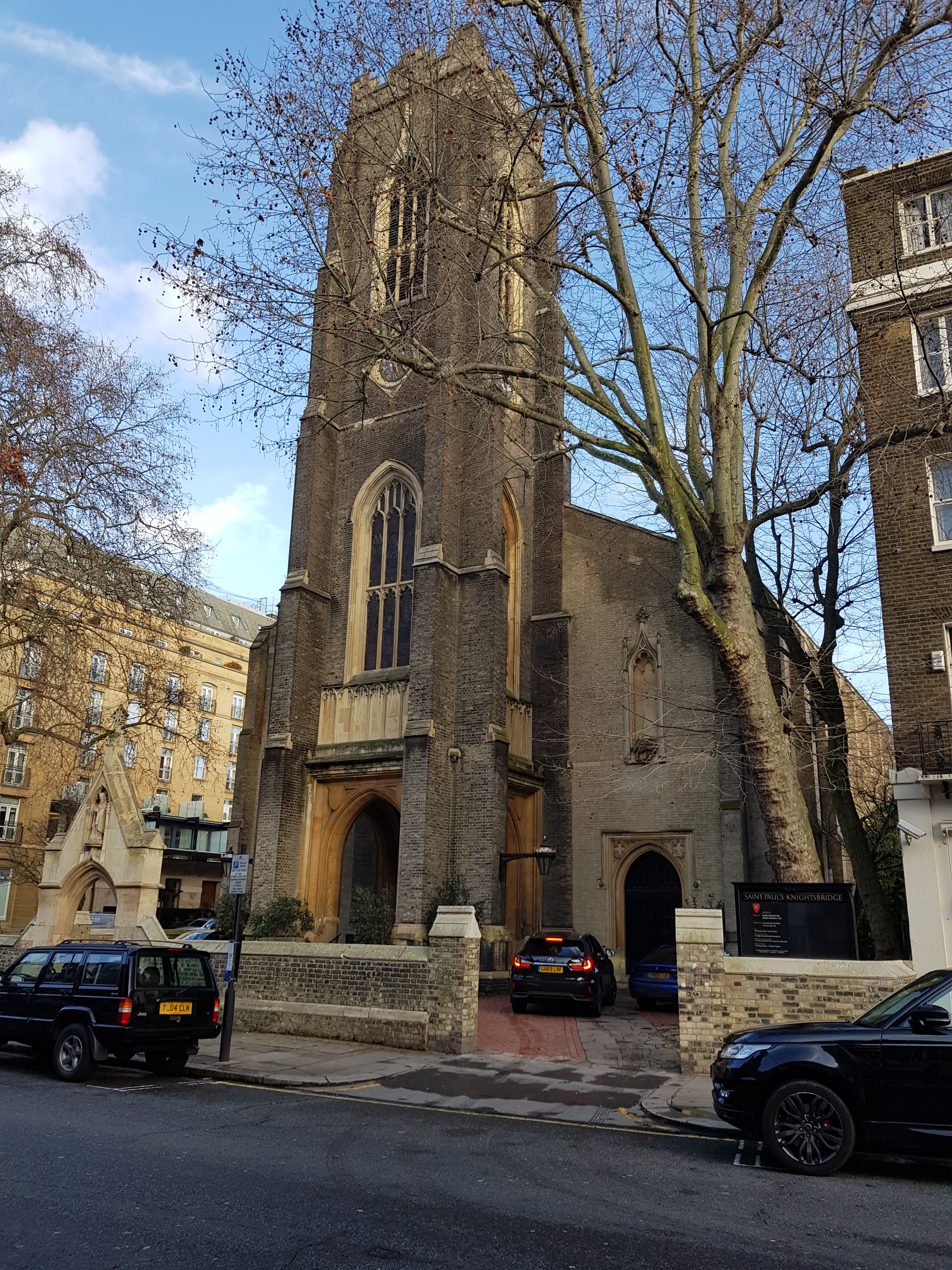
- St Paul's Church
- 51.5015°N 0.1557°W
- Location: 32a Wilton Place, Knightsbridge, London SW1X 8SH
- Country: England
- Denomination: Church of England
- Churchmanship: Anglo-Catholic
- Website: stpaulsknightsbridge.org

History
- Dedication: Saint Paul

Architecture
- Heritage designation: Grade II*
- Designated: 24-Feb-1958
- Architect: Thomas Cundy the younger
- Style: Victorian Gothic
- Years built: 1843

Administration
- Province: Canterbury
- Diocese: London
- Archdeaconry: Charing Cross
- Deanery: Westminster (St Margaret)
- Parish: St Paul, Wilton Place

Clergy
- Archbishop: Archbishop of Canterbury
- Bishop: Bishop of London
- Vicar(s): Alan Gyle; Rosie Richardson; James Chegwidden

St Paul's Church, Knightsbridge, is an English Grade II* listed Anglican church in the Anglo-Catholic tradition, located at 32a Wilton Place in Knightsbridge, London.

== History and architecture ==
The church was founded in 1843, the first in London to champion the ideals of the Oxford Movement, during the incumbency of the Rev. W. J. E. Bennett. The architect was Thomas Cundy the younger.

After the building's consecration in 1843, the chancel with its rood screen and striking reredos was added in 1892 by the noted church architect George Frederick Bodley, who also decorated St Luke's chapel, which stands in the place of a lady chapel to the south of the sanctuary, the lady chapel of St Paul's having traditionally been seen as being the church of St Mary's, Bourne Street.

The tiled panels around the walls of the nave, created in the 1870s by Daniel Bell, depict scenes from the life of Jesus. The Stations of the Cross that intersperse the tiled panels, painted in the early 1920s by Gerald Moira, show scenes from the crucifixion story. The font dates from 1842 and is carved with biblical scenes from both the Old and New testaments. There are statues of the Virgin and Child (1896) above the entrance to the chapel and of St Paul (1902) above the lectern.

A memorial in the church commemorates 52 members of the First Aid Nursing Yeomanry who died on active service during the Second World War while carrying out secret intelligence work for the Special Operations Executive in occupied countries in addition to providing transport drivers for the Auxiliary Territorial Service. Among the names on the memorial are three holders of the George Cross.

St Paul's sister parish in the United States is St. Paul's Parish, K Street, in Washington, D.C..

== Notable events ==
=== Weddings ===
- 15 January 1857: Sir Edward Colebrooke, 4th Baronet, and Elizabeth Richardson
- 28 November 1865: The Rev. Basil Wilberforce and Charlotte Langford
- 13 February 1884: George Osborne (later 10th Duke of Leeds) and Katherine Lambton
- 9 February 1886: Ailwyn Fellowes (later 1st Baron Ailwyn) and Agatha Joliffe
- 19 October 1886: Evelyn Boscawen (later 7th Viscount Falmouth) and Kathleen Douglas-Pennant
- 1 November 1894: James Hamilton (later 3rd Duke of Abercorn) and Rosalind Bingham
- 28 November 1899: Sir James Reid and the Honourable Susan Baring
- 28 July 1900: George Cornwallis-West and Jennie Churchill (née Jerome; mother of Winston Churchill)
- 30 April 1902: Julian Byng (later 1st Viscount Byng of Vimy) and Evelyn Moreton
- 25 July 1905: George Montagu (later 9th Earl of Sandwich) and Alberta Sturges
- 29 November 1909: Charles Greville, 3rd Baron Greville and Olive Kerr
- 19 January 1916: Lieutenant (later Admiral) Frederic Wake-Walker and Muriel Elsie Hughes
- 2 January 1946: Bruce Shand and Rosalind Cubitt (parents of Queen Camilla)
- 3 February 1977: Charles Wellesley (later 9th Duke of Wellington) and Princess Antonia of Prussia
- 21 Dec 2015: Frank Lampard and Christine Bleakley

=== Funerals and memorial services ===
- 1937: J. Bruce Ismay, English businessman
- 1985: The Rev. Walter Hussey, English priest of the Church of England
- 2007: Mark Birley, British entrepreneur
- 2012: Angharad Rees, British actress
- 2017: Patricia Knatchbull, 2nd Countess Mountbatten of Burma, British peeress
- 2018: Annabelle Neilson, English socialite

== Gallery ==
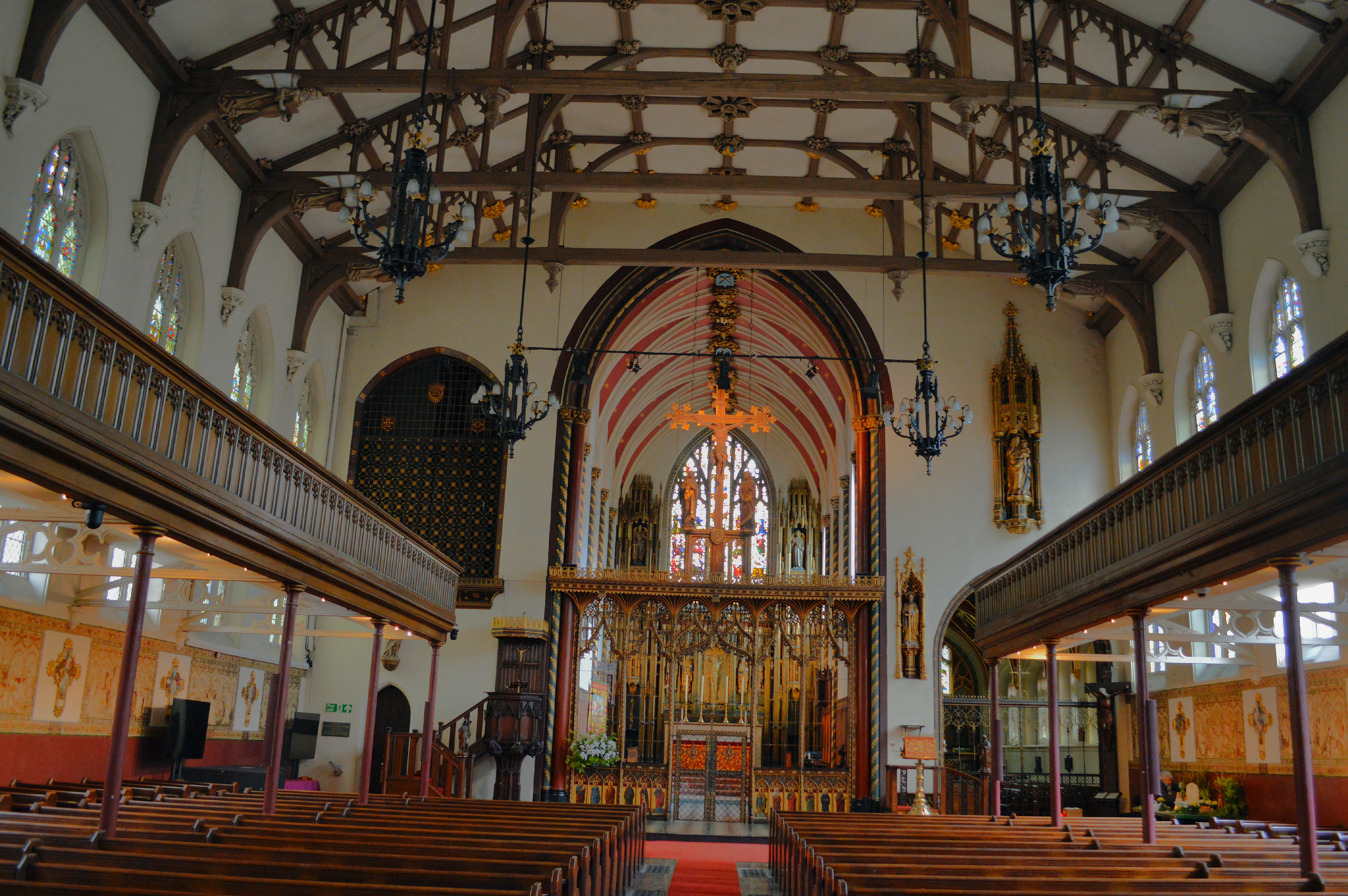
Interior

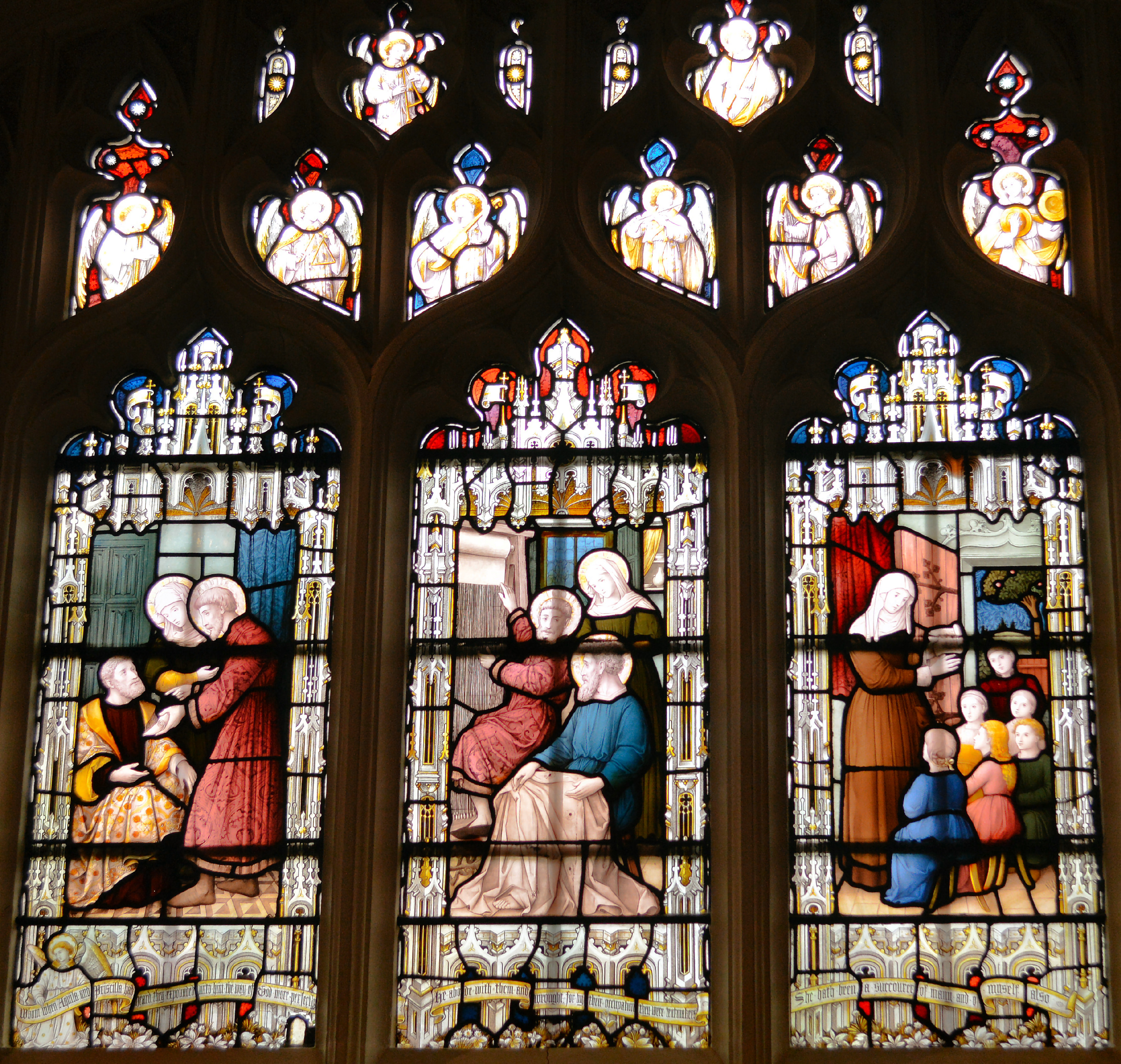
Stained glass by Lavers and Westlake (1895)

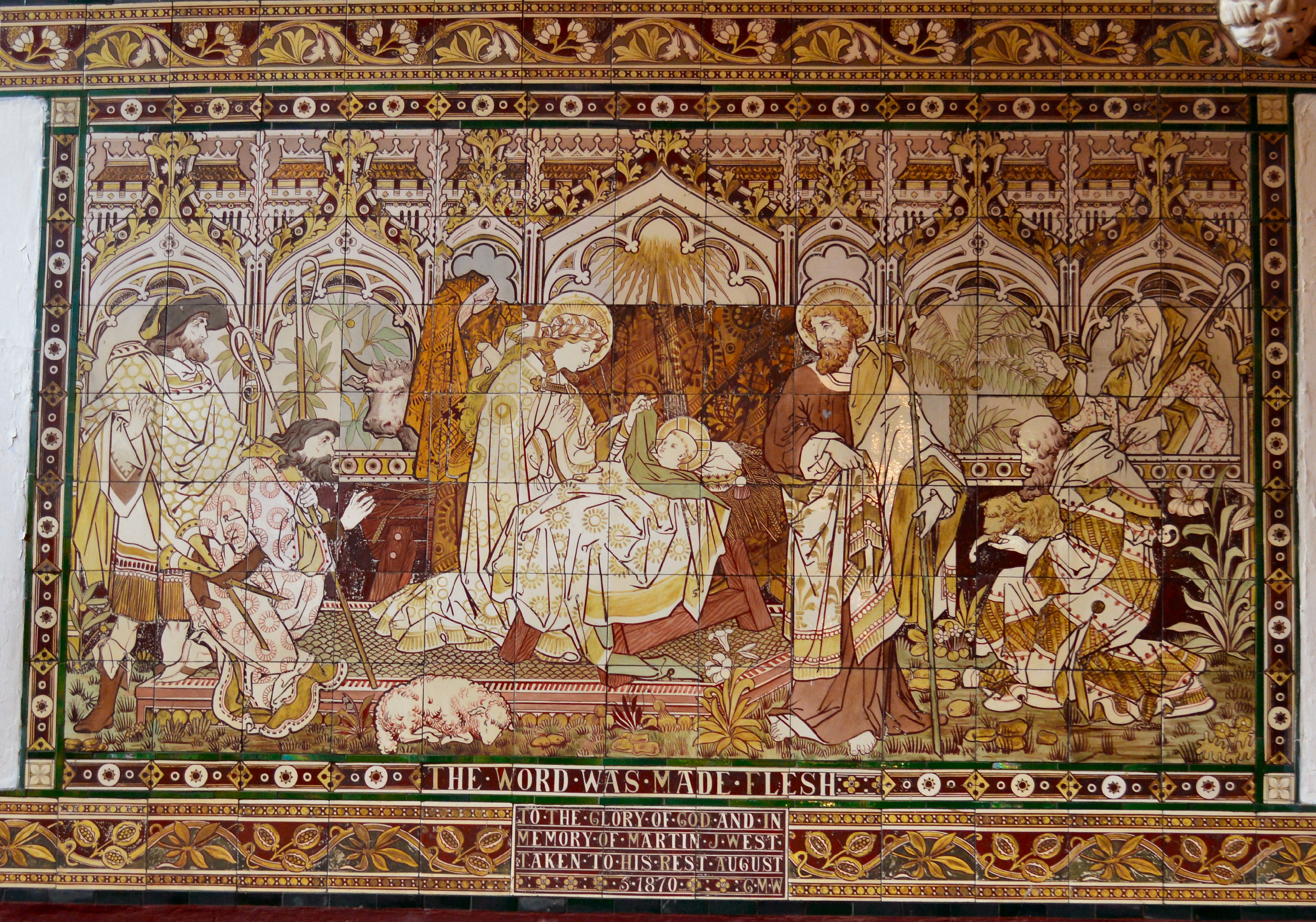
Tiled panel by Daniel Bell

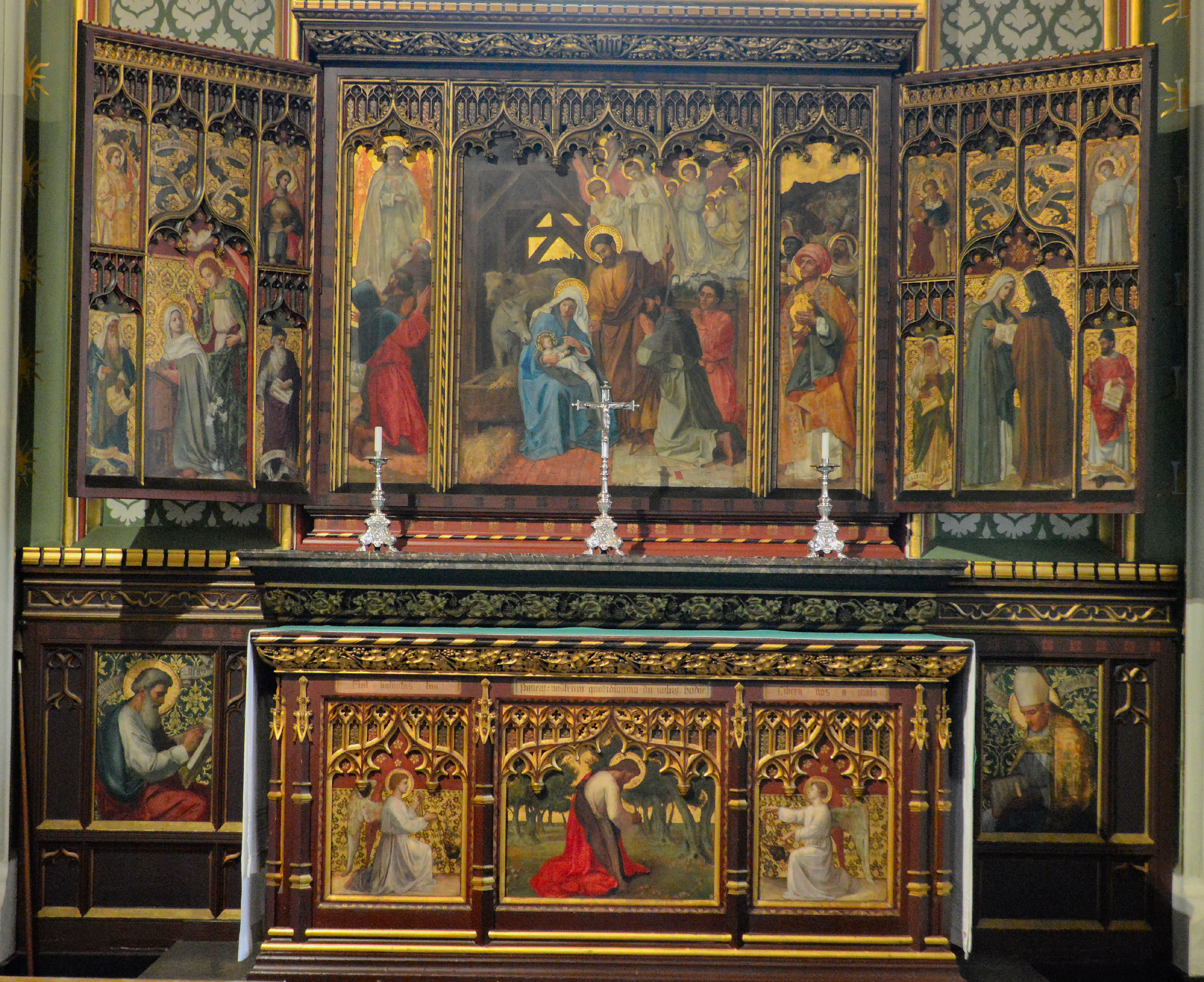
Altar by Arthur Blomfield (1889)

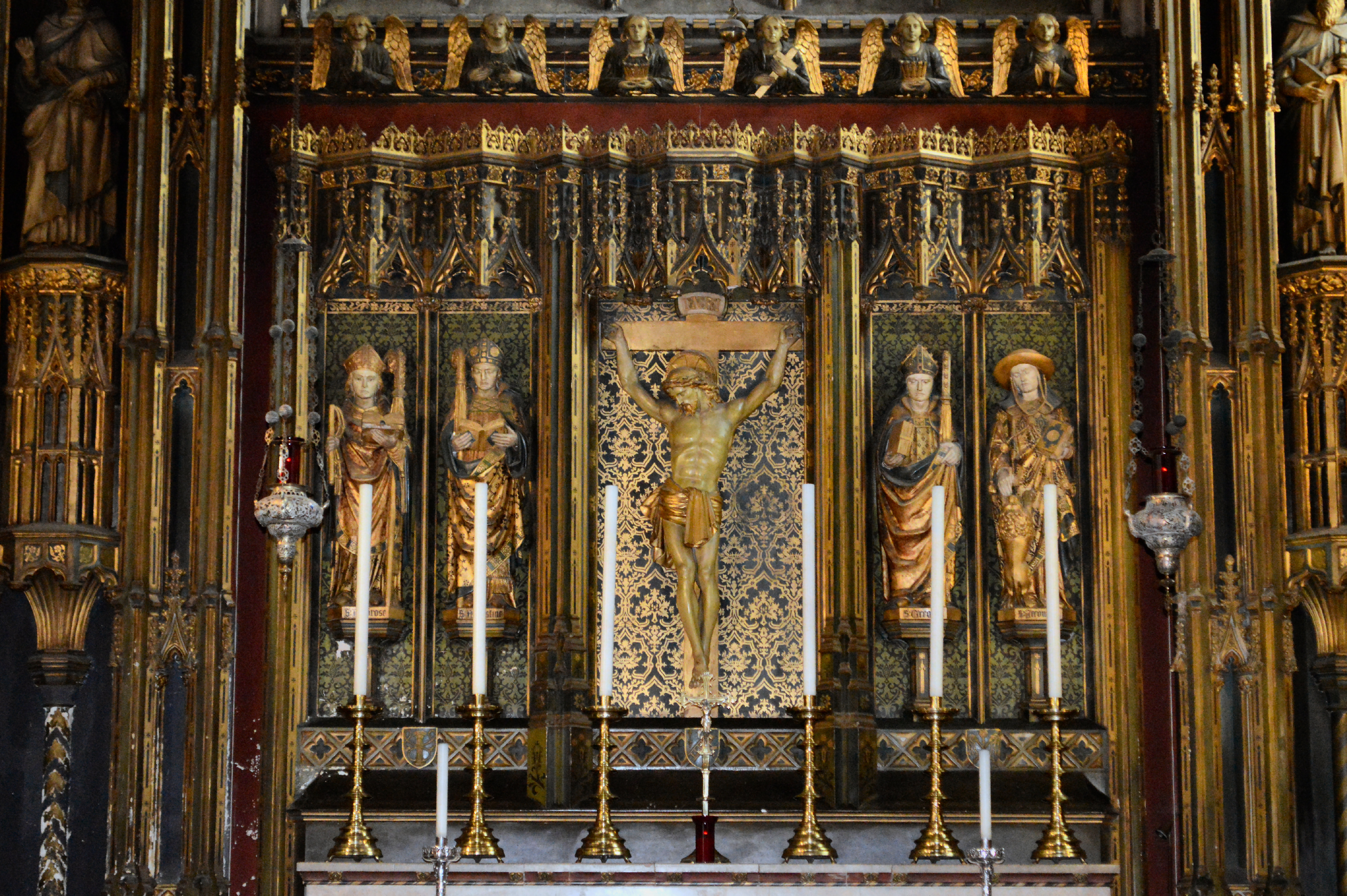
Reredos

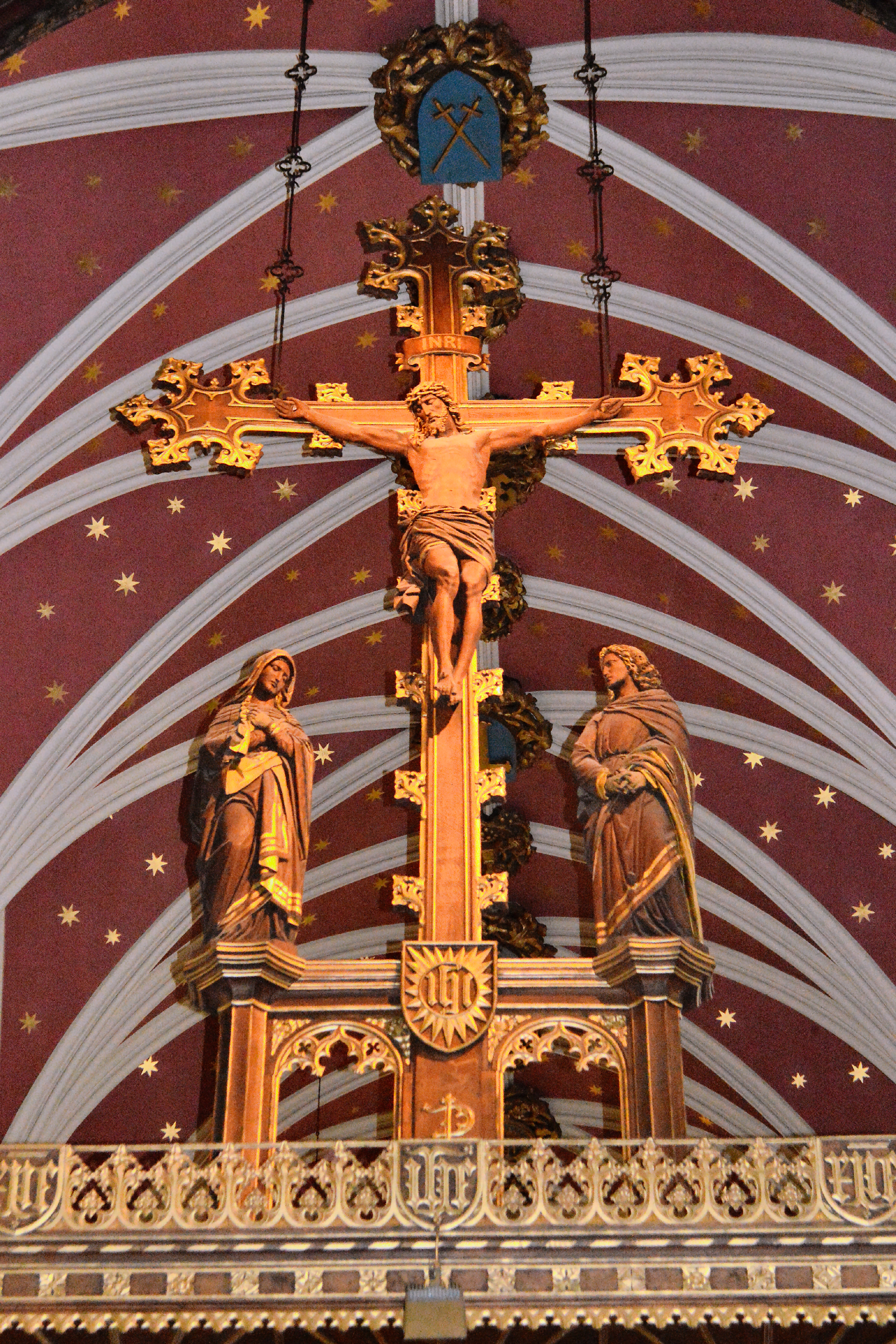
Rood cross

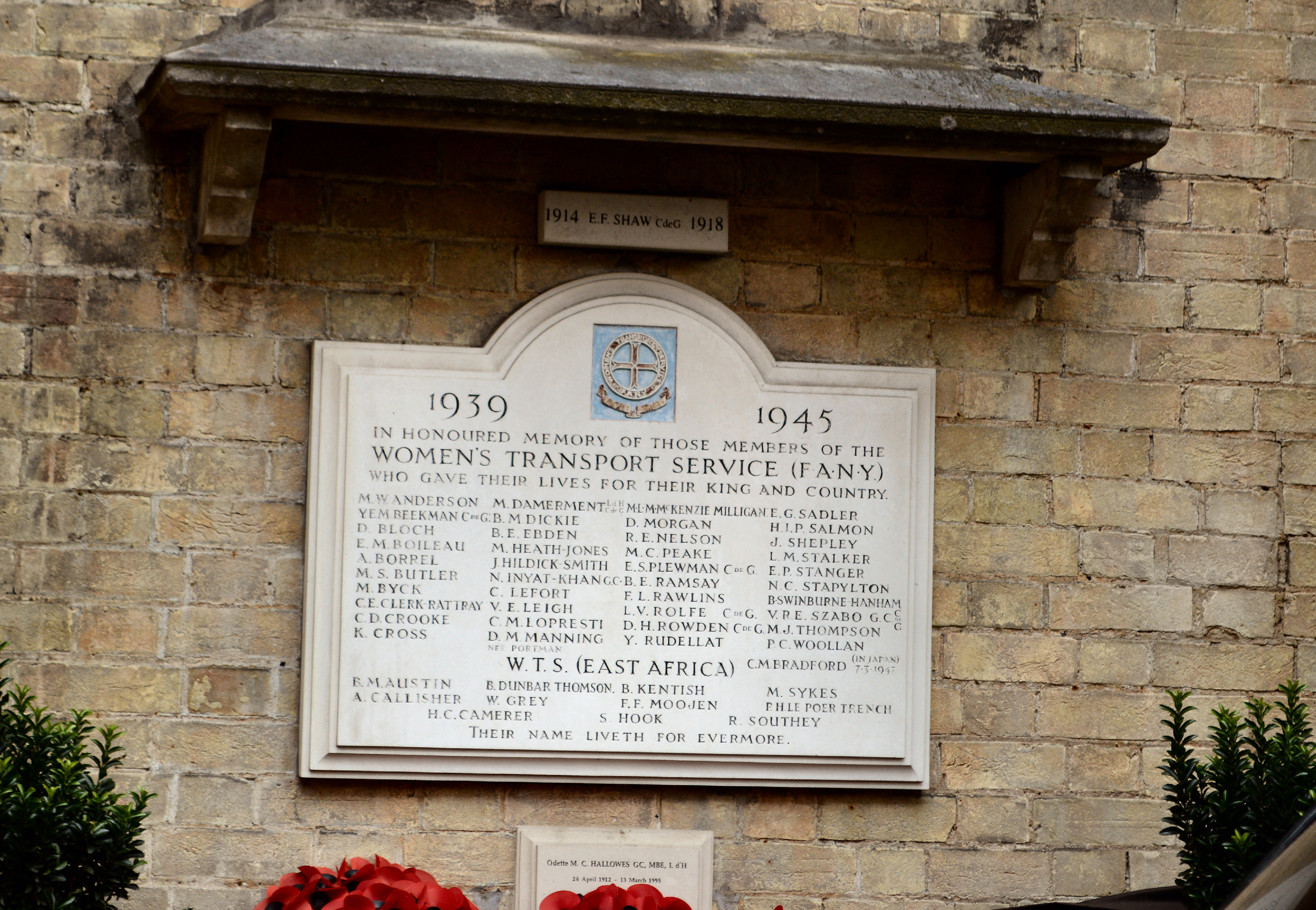
Women's Transport Service WW2 War Memorial

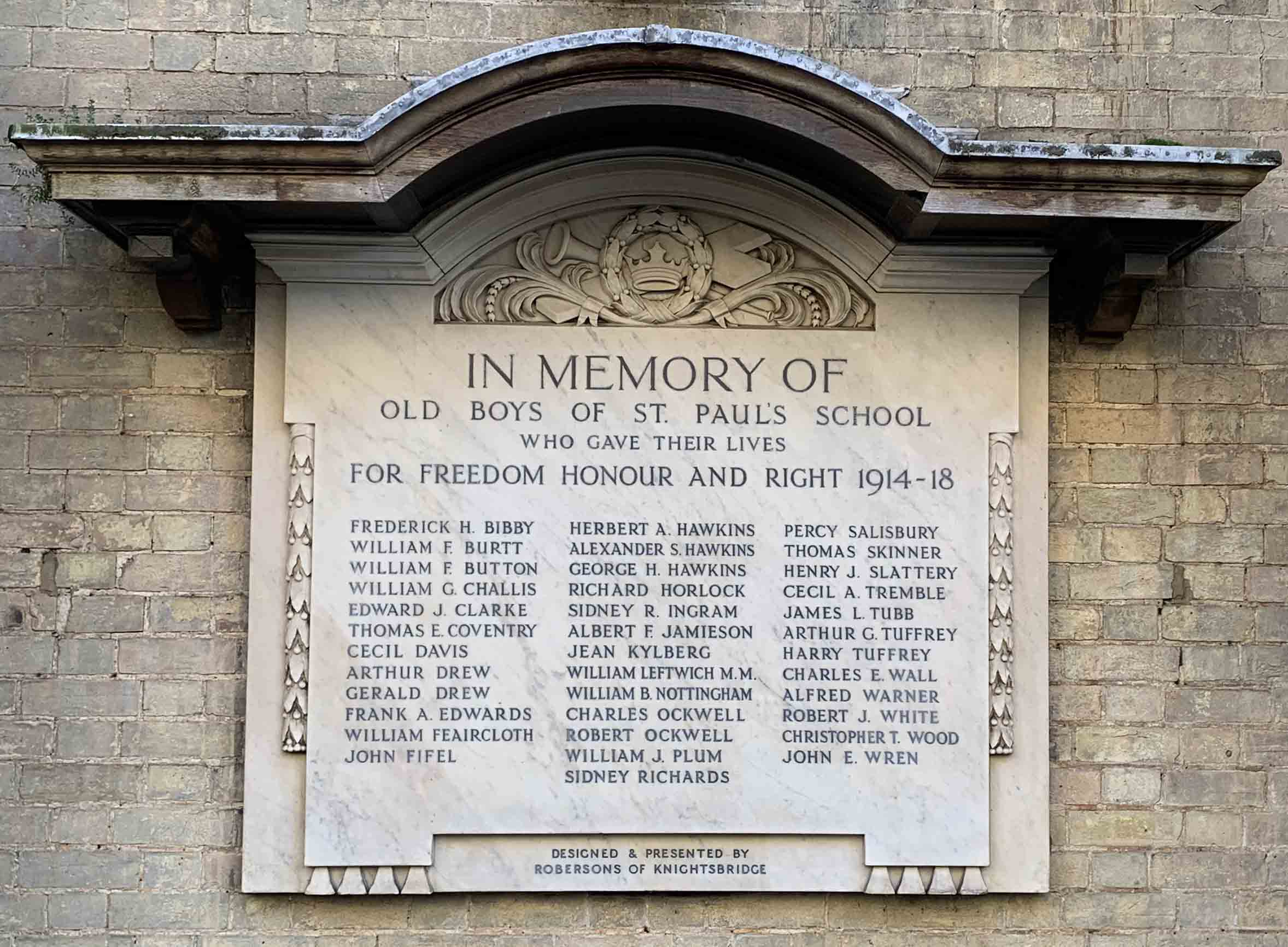
Memorial to Old Boys of St Paul's School
