= Maybourne =

Luxury hotel operator

- Type: Private
- Industry: Hospitality, tourism
- Headquarters: London, United Kingdom
- Website: www.maybourne.com

Maybourne is a British luxury hotel operator, which owns and manages The Berkeley, Claridge's, The Connaught and The Emory in London, The Maybourne Beverly Hills in Los Angeles and The Maybourne Riviera in Roquebrune-Cap-Martin.

== History and background ==
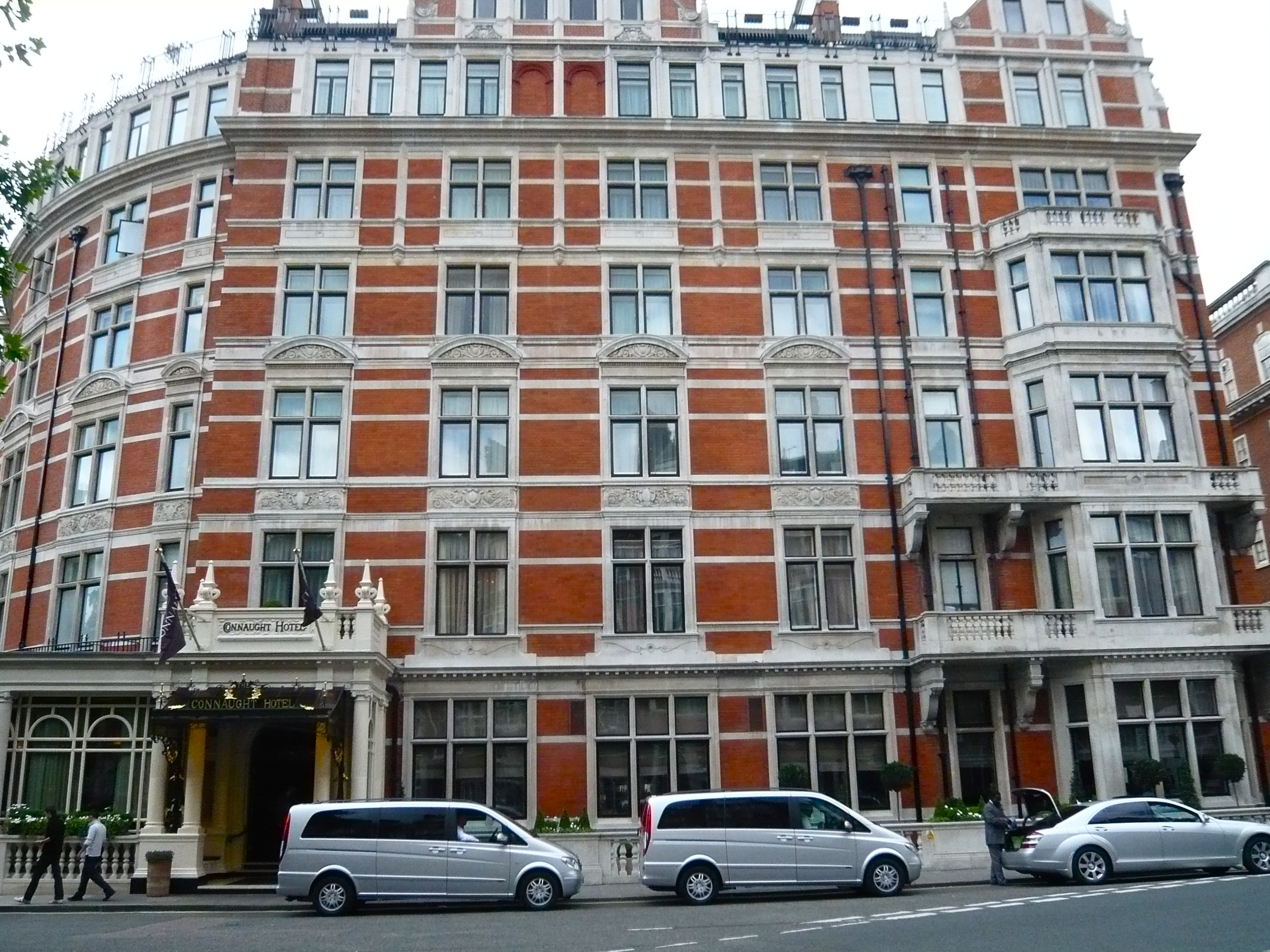
Maybourne's oldest hotel The Connaught

Maybourne, formerly the Savoy Hotel Group, has been operating luxury hotels in London with origins that go back over 200 years. The group was renamed when the Savoy Hotel was sold off from the original group of four hotels – The Savoy, Claridge's, The Berkeley and The Connaught.

The oldest hotel in the group is The Connaught, which was originally built as the Prince of Saxe Coburg Hotel in 1815. It was renamed The Connaught in 1917 after Queen Victoria's third son, Prince Arthur, the first Duke of Connaught.

The Maybourne name was formed when a group of Irish investors, headed by Derek Quinlan, bought the Savoy group of hotels from Blackstone and Colony Capital in 2003 for £750m. It was decided soon afterwards that the Savoy Hotel did not fit into the plans, thus this hotel was sold to Kingdom Holding for approximately £250m. As the three remaining hotels were in a very poor state of repair, one of the investors, Paddy McKillen, immediately set out on a plan to completely refurbish the properties, beginning with The Connaught. Finance for the purchase of the group was provided by Anglo Irish Bank. When the financial crisis hit, Anglo Irish Bank was not able to survive, and the group's loans were transferred to National Asset Management Agency (NAMA), a workout bank created by the Government of Ireland in response to the Irish financial crisis.

In a controversial move, NAMA sold the loans which were among the bank's best to the UK's Barclay brothers for their full par value plus all interest owed. This gave the Barclay brothers a once in a lifetime opportunity to launch a hostile attack on the hotel company. The Barclay brothers owned the Ritz Hotel in London and always nurtured an interest in the three Maybourne hotels. They immediately set a pre-pack administration in motion in an attempt to eliminate McKillen's shares and take over the company. McKillen went to the High Court on the day the attack was launched and succeeded in blocking the takeover attempt. This set in motion the most expensive High Court legal action of its time. The case became extremely bitter between McKillen and the brothers lasting five years and costing over £50m.

The Barclay brothers amassed shares from original shareholders in the Maybourne Hotel group which McKillen claimed was illegal. McKillen lost every case in the marathon legal action but effectively wore down the Barclay brothers and their interest in the company was successfully transferred to the Qatari royal family. McKillen is no longer a shareholder of the hotel group but provides a consultancy service to the group on a day-to-day basis.

In December 2019, Maybourne acquired the Montage Hotel in Beverly Hills, California, and said the acquisition was part of a global expansion strategy.

== Hotels ==
The Connaught on Carlos Place, Mayfair was closed for a year of restoration in 2008. It was reopened totally restored including a modern wing with 121 rooms, an Aman Spa, an underground swimming pool and a restaurant operated by 3 star Michelin chef, Helene Darroze. The chef Jean George Vongerichten runs the hotel's all-day dining restaurant and also the recently opened Connaught Grill. The Connaught bar has won international awards including World's Best Bar (Tales of the Cocktail) and has been voted the best bar in Europe (World's 50 Best 2019).

Claridge's opened in 1898. Designed by CW Stephens, it is located in the heart of Mayfair and became famous for its Art Deco design. By 2004, Claridge's with its famous lobby was also in a poor state of repair. McKillen with the architect Michael Blair won a major planning permission to excavate a five-level basement under the hotel by hand. The hotel maintained normal business while this major work was being carried out. These works were completed in 2022.

In 2019, the hotel unveiled a new restaurant, Davies and Brook, run by chef Daniel Humm, former holder of World's best restaurant at Eleven Madison Park in New York. The hotel is embarking on an ongoing series of room and suite restorations, recently unveiling a new Royal Suite, an Empress Eugenie Suite and a Prince Alexander Suite.

The Berkeley, which was built on its present site in 1972 in Knightsbridge, has been completely renovated over the last few years. In 2017 a major contemporary front façade face lift was unveiled. It was designed by The Pritzker prize-winning architect Richard Rogers. Michelin starred chef Marcus Wareing has his famous restaurant at the Berkeley, and it is home to the Blue Bar. Hong Kong–based designer Andre Fu completed a series of new pavilion penthouse suites at the hotel in 2018.

On 20 December 2019, Maybourne acquired Montage Beverly Hills, its first hotel outside London. It was announced that it would be known as The Maybourne Beverly Hills.

Photos	Hotel	Location	Notes
	Claridge's	London, United Kingdom	Established 1812 as Mivart's Hotel; current building opened 1898
	The Connaught	London, United Kingdom	Founded 1815 as the Prince of Saxe Coburg Hotel; current building completed 1897; renamed The Connaught in 1917
	The Berkeley	London, United Kingdom	Began in the early 18th century as a coffee house; renamed The Berkeley Hotel in 1897; moved to its present site in 1972
	The Emory	London, United Kingdom	Opened in April 2024
	The Maybourne Riviera	Roquebrune-Cap-Martin, France	Opened in 2021; the former Vista Palace hotel
	The Maybourne Beverly Hills	Beverly Hills, United States	Acquired in December 2019; the former Montage Beverly Hills hotel
	The Maybourne Saint-Germain	Paris, France	Scheduled to open in 2027; conversion of the Îlot Saint-Germain, the former Ministry of Defence headquarters
	The Savoy	London, United Kingdom	Sold in January 2005 (former property)
