= Édouard Nignon =

French chef (1865–1934)

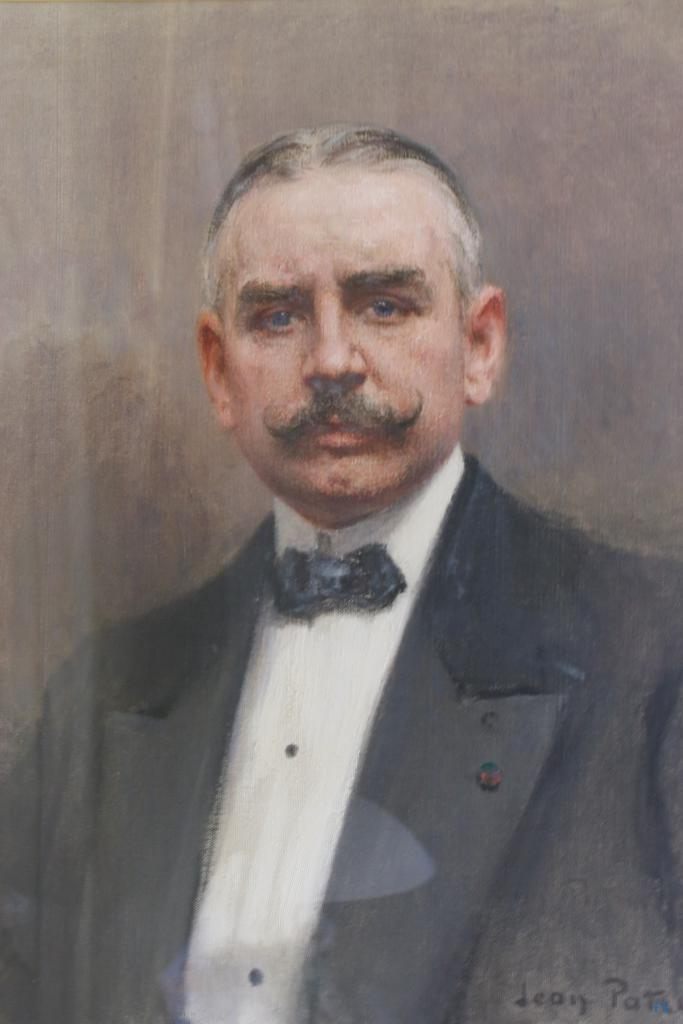
- Born: 9 November 1865; Nantes
- Died: 30 October 1934 (aged 69); Bréal-sous-Montfort

Édouard Nignon (French pronunciation: [edwaʁ niɲɔ̃]; 9 November 1865, Nantes - 30 October 1934, Bréal-sous-Montfort) was a French chef and writer of cookbooks.

== Life ==
One of eight children of a day laborer and a seamstress, Nignon became an apprentice at Cambronne Restaurant at the age of 9. A year later, he joined Monier Restaurant, where he learned to read and write. After more work in Angers and Cholet, he arrived to Paris, where he assisted famous chefs and eventually became a chef himself.

He lived in Austria and Russia, where he served the highest dignitaries, including the emperors Nicholas II of Russia and Franz Joseph I of Austria. He worked as the chef of Claridge's in London from 1894 to 1901. In 1908, he bought Larue Restaurant in Paris. He retired in 1928.

When his restaurant was going through a crisis in World War I, he started writing cookbooks. His most famous cookbook, Éloges de la cuisine française ("Praise of French Cuisine"), was published in 1933. It promoted deglazing with water, clear broths, and parsimonious seasoning.

Nignon is credited with inventing the beuchelle tourangelle, a veal kidney and rice stew inspired by the Austrian beuschel stew. Interested in unusual taste combinations, he created oysters with camembert and homard a la dinardaise, a lobster salad with the "insane trio" of truffles, mustard and pickles.

== Legacy ==
Ignored by the general public, Nignon has been recognized by chefs as one of the fathers of modern cuisine. His legacy has been revived after a long period of being eclipsed by his more famous contemporary, Auguste Escoffier.

Michel Guérard, one of the founders of nouvelle cuisine, described Nignon as a visionary chef who had a huge influence on French cooks such as himself and Joël Robuchon. A recent article on contemporary cookbooks called Nignon "the Flaubert of the ovens," who created "gourmet epics". His Eulogies were called a "seminal book" of "bourgeois cuisine."

An original copy of Nignon's Heptameron was sold for 16 thousand euros in the 2010s.

Chef Yvon Garnier founded Culinary Institute Edouard Nignon in Nantes.

== Works ==
- 1919 : L'Heptaméron des gourmets ou les Délices de la cuisine française (The Seven Days of Gourmets or the Delights of French Cuisine)
- 1926 : Les Plaisirs de la table, où sous une forme nouvelle, l'auteur a dévoilé maints délicieux secrets et recettes de bonne cuisine, transcrits les précieux avis de gourmets fameux et de fins gastronomes, conseillers aimables et sûrs en l'art de bien manger (The pleasures of the table, where the author uses a new form to reveal many delicious secrets and recipes of fine cuisine, transcribing precious advice of famous gourmets and fine gastronomes, kind and confident counsellors of the art of fine dining)
- 1933 : Éloges de la cuisine française (Praise of French cuisine), with a preface by Sacha Guitry.
