= Michaela Reid =

Danish/British author

Michaela, Lady Reid is a Danish/British author. Although her parents were Danes, she was educated in the UK, reading law at Girton College, Cambridge. She married Sir Alexander Reid, the grandson of Sir James Reid, personal physician to Queen Victoria. She discovered Sir James's papers in the 1960s after moving into Ellon Castle in Aberdeenshire. Her book based on these papers, Ask Sir James, was critically acclaimed and has been reprinted by Eland Books.

She lives in Lanton, Scottish Borders.
