= Wilton Place =

Street in Knightsbridge, London

Coordinates: 51°30′3.16″N 0°9′21.53″W

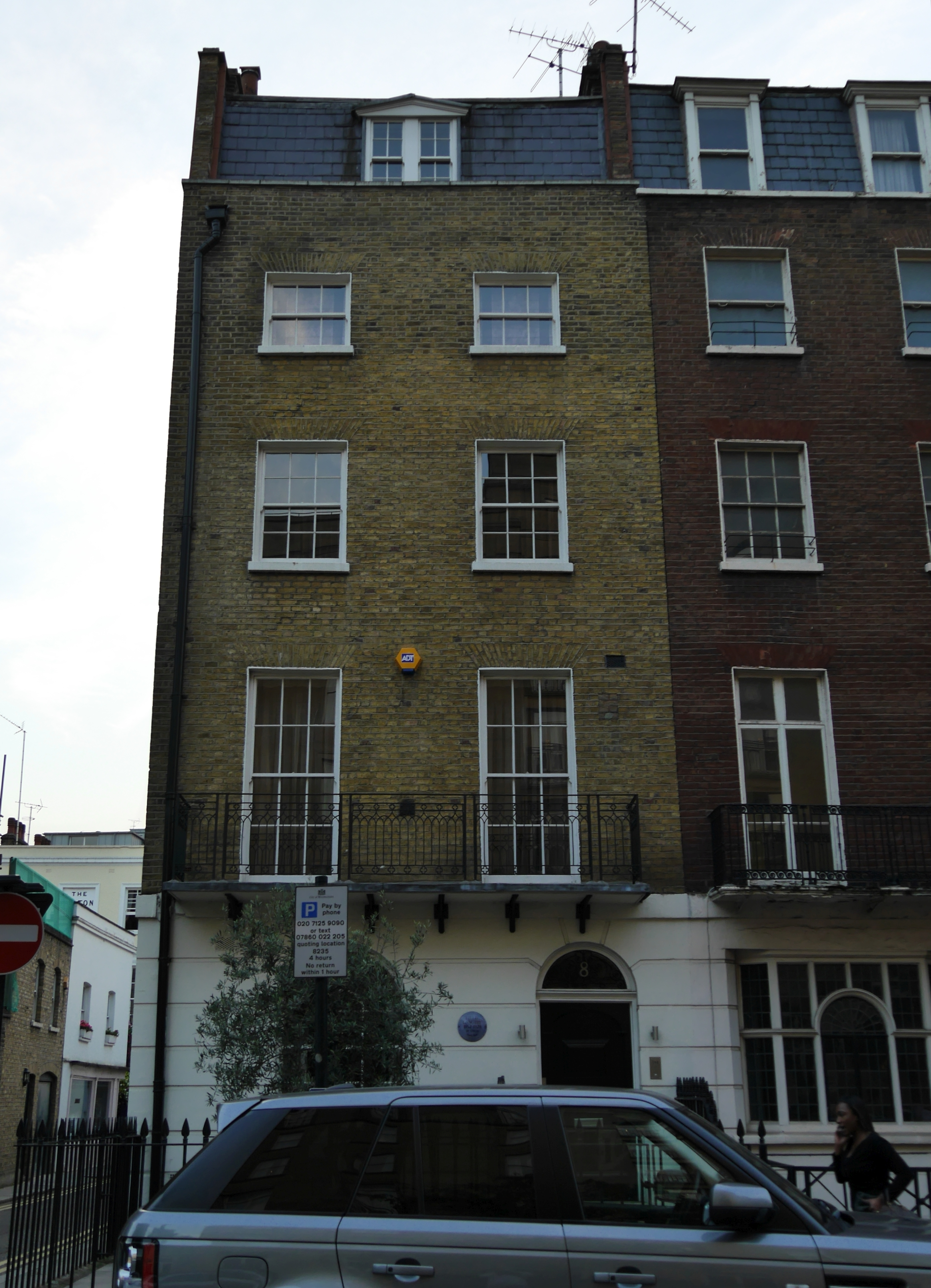
8 Wilton Place, London

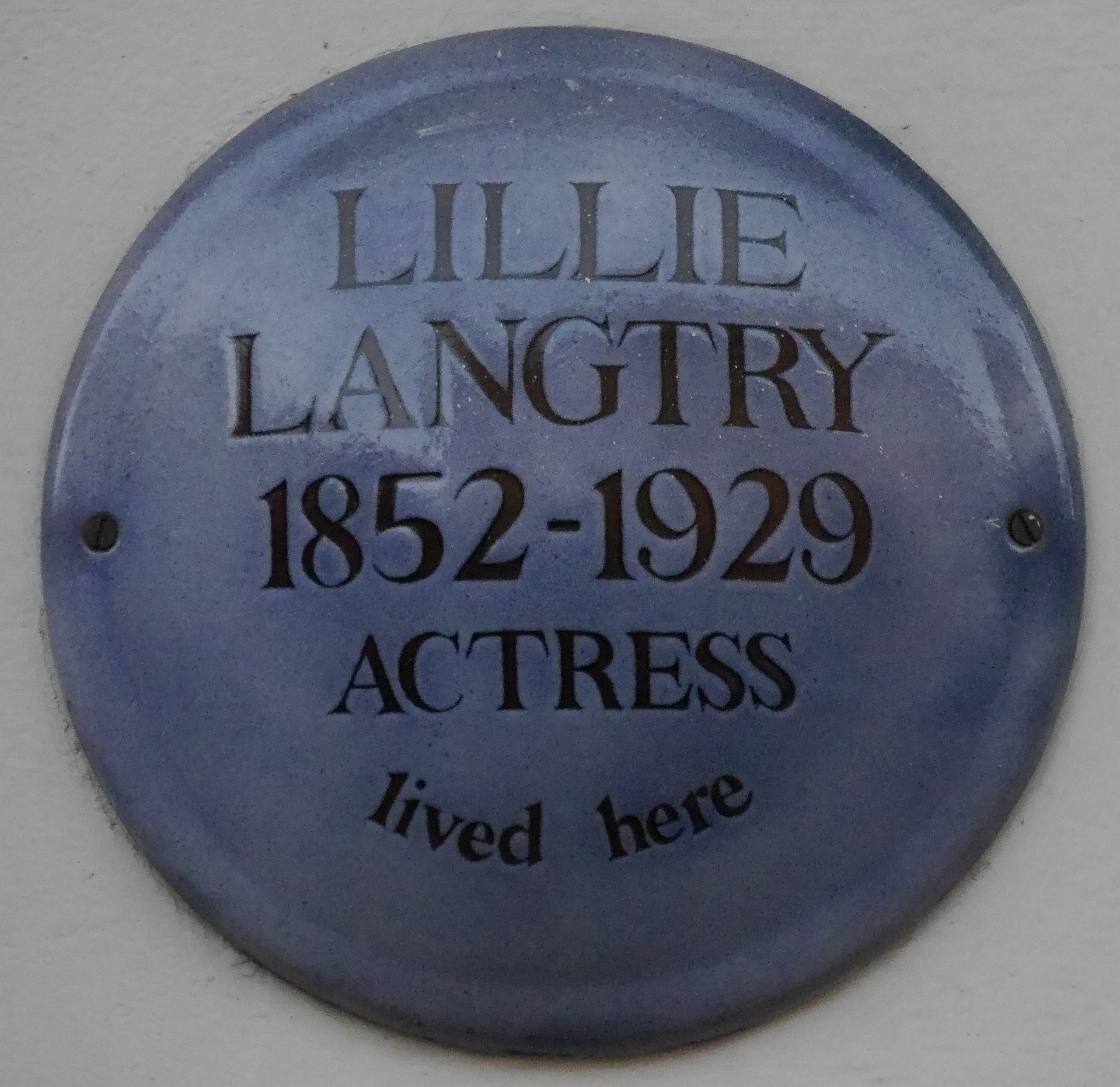
Lillie Langtry plaque, 8 Wilton Place

Wilton Place is a street in Knightsbridge, London. It runs north–south between Knightsbridge to the north and Wilton Crescent to the south.

It is home to The Berkeley, a five star hotel, and St Paul's Church, Knightsbridge.

The Berkeley stands on the site of what was Esmeralda's Barn, a nightclub given to Reggie Kray by the infamous landlord Peter Rachman. It was next to a bistro called Joan's Kitchen.

- No 8 was home to the actress Lillie Langtry.
- No 25 was home to the botanist William Bentham.
