= Savoir Beds =

Bed and mattress company

- Trade name: Savoir Beds
- Company type: Privately Held Company
- Industry: Luxury Goods
- Founded: 1905
- Founder: The Savoy Hotel
- Headquarters: London, United Kingdom
- Key people: Rupert D'Oyly Carte
- Website: savoirbeds.com

Savoir Beds is based in London, UK and handcrafts luxury mattresses and box springs. Their mattresses are created from natural materials such as curled horsetail, cashmere, lambs wool and cotton. The company is best known for creating The Savoy Bed (or No.2 Bed), which was first made in 1905 for the Savoy Hotel. Savoir Beds continue to supply the Savoy Hotel, and installed beds during and after the hotel's 2010 refurbishment.

== History ==
Savoir Beds began life as part of the Savoy Hotel. In 1904 the hotel was expanded by Rupert D'Oyly Carte, who decided at the time that they should develop a bed unique to the Savoy Hotel. In 1905, this resulted in The Savoy Bed being created, which was manufactured by James Edwards Limited. The beds were covered in a Savoy designed ticking attributed to his stepmother, Helen Carte, which has become the trademark of Savoir Beds.

In 1924 the Savoy Hotel bought James Edwards Limited. At the time, the beds were made in a workshop that became known as The Savoy Bedworks, which is located close to London's theatre land. The No.2 Bed was supplied to other hotels, which were at that time part of the Savoy Group, including Claridge's and The Berkeley.

=== Recent decades ===
In 1987 The Savoy Bedworks moved to Mitcham, south of London, which became Savoir Beds in 1997, when Alistair Hughes and his business partner purchased it. The name change came after the Savoy sold off this arm of the business. Savoir Beds continued to make The Savoy Bed (or No.2 Bed) in the same way, taking on the craftsmen and equipment from the Savoy Hotel.

In 1998 Savoir Beds moved the Bedworks and craftsmen to Park Royal in northwest London. In 1999 Savoir Beds became a member of Walpole, the not-for-profit organisation that furthers the interests of the British luxury industry by harnessing and sharing the collective knowledge, experience and resources of the membership.

=== Showrooms ===
In 2001, Savoir Beds opened its first showroom in London's Wigmore Street. In June 2012 Savoir Beds opened a second bedworks in Treforest, South Wales. It also has a concession in Harrods.

As of 2020, Savoir Beds had showrooms in major cities worldwide, including London, Düsseldorf, Paris, New York, Shanghai, Hong Kong, Singapore, Moscow, Qingdao, Seoul and Taipei.
