= Claridge's =

Luxury hotel in London

General information
- Type: Luxury hotel
- Location: Brook Street, Mayfair, London, England
- Coordinates: 51°30′45″N 0°08′51″W
- Named for: William and Marianne Claridge
- Opened: 1856 (original building); 1898 (current building)
- Renovated: 1996; 2016–2021
- Owner: Maybourne Hotel Group
- Affiliation: The Walpole Committee

Technical details
- Material: Red brick with red Mansfield stone, slate roofs and cast iron balconies
- Floor count: Six plus four storeys of attics and five basement levels

Design and construction
- Architect: C. W. Stephens (1898)
- Other designers: Ernest George (interior)

Other information
- Number of rooms: 190
- Number of restaurants: 2 (Claridge's Restaurant, The Foyer & Reading Room)
- Number of bars: 3 (Claridge's Bar, The Fumoir, The Painter's Room)
- Facilities: Health Club & Spa
- Public transit: Bond Street

Website
- claridges.co.uk

Listed Building – Grade II
- Official name: Claridges Hotel and attached railings Claridges Hotel wing
- Designated: 8 May 1981
- Reference no.: 1219905

Claridge's is a 5-star hotel at the corner of Brook Street and Davies Street in Mayfair, London. The hotel is owned and managed by the Maybourne Hotel Group.

== History ==
=== Founding ===
Claridge's traces its origins to Mivart's Hotel, which was founded in 1812 in a conventional London terraced house and grew by expanding into neighbouring houses. In 1854, the founder (the father of biologist St. George Jackson Mivart) sold the hotel to William and Marianne Claridge, who owned a smaller hotel next door. They combined the two operations, and after trading for a time as "Mivart's late Claridge's", they settled on the current name.

The reputation of the hotel was confirmed in 1860, when Empress Eugenie made an extended visit and entertained Queen Victoria at the hotel. In its first edition of 1878, Baedeker's London listed Claridge's as "The first hotel in London".

=== Acquisitions ===
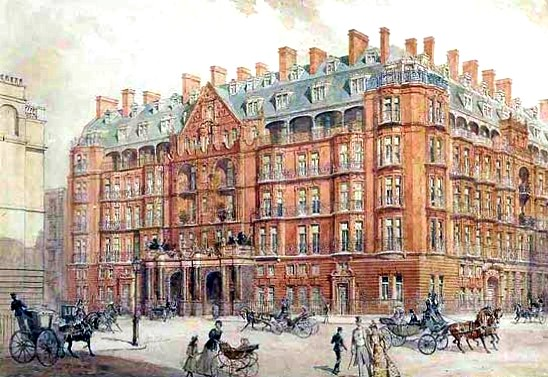
Drawing of the current Claridge's building from 1897, the year before the reopening

Richard D'Oyly Carte, the theatrical impresario and founder of the rival Savoy Hotel, purchased Claridge's in 1893, as part of The Savoy Group, and shortly afterwards demolished the old buildings and replaced them with the present ones. This was prompted by the need to install modern facilities such as lifts and en suite bathrooms. From 1894 to 1901, Édouard Nignon was the hotel chef.

=== 19th and 20th centuries ===
The new Claridge's, built by George Trollope & Sons, opened in 1898. It is a Grade II listed building. The hotel has 203 rooms and suites and around 400 staff.

After the First World War, Claridge's flourished due to demand from aristocrats who no longer maintained a London house, and under the leadership of Carte's son, Rupert D'Oyly Carte, an extension was built in the 1920s. During the Second World War, it was the base of the Kingdom of Yugoslavia's government in exile and home of Peter II of Yugoslavia.

In 1996, the foyer was restored by architect Thierry Despont.

In 1998, the group of hotels – along with the later-added Connaught – was sold for $867 million to two American private-equity funds, Blackstone and Colony Capital.

=== 21st century renovation and relaunch ===
In 2005, the private-equity owners sold The Savoy Group, including Claridge's, to a group of Irish investors led by Derek Quinlan. The investors later sold the Savoy Hotel and Savoy Theatre and renamed the group Maybourne Hotel Group. The Maybourne Hotel Group includes two other five-star hotels in London, The Berkeley and The Connaught.

Between 2016 and 2021, the hotel was renovated and expanded. Two floors were added through a roof extension, expanding capacity by 40 rooms or suites, including a penthouse. Additionally, plans were submitted for a five-storey subterranean "iceberg basement" containing a swimming pool, gym, spa, and wine store. The five-storey basement was met with resistance by local bodies, and Westminster Council by this time had established a "sub squad" to address the impact of underground development in London. A 22 m-deep (72 ft) excavation was dug beneath the Art Deco 1920s extension to create the five-level basement. Construction work was largely done by hand to avoid disturbing guests, and the hotel continued in operation throughout the building work. The project was recorded in a BBC documentary series, The Mayfair Hotel Megabuild.

== Notable guests ==
In his memoir The Moon's a Balloon, David Niven wrote that for film producer Alexander Korda, "Home was the penthouse at Claridge's". The hotel lobby and several guestrooms appear in Stephen Poliakoff's 2001 BBC television drama Perfect Strangers. Claridge's has hosted visiting royalty and guests of the Royal Family. The late King Hassan of Morocco travelled with his own mattress, but at the hotel he used a Savoy Mattress. Impressed by the quality, he ordered 24 identical mattresses from the Savoy for his palace.

King Peter II of Yugoslavia and his wife, Queen Alexandra, spent much of the Second World War in exile at Claridge's, and suite 212 was supposedly ceded by the United Kingdom to Yugoslavia for a single day (17 July 1945) to allow their heir, Crown Prince Alexander, to be born on Yugoslav soil, although no documentary evidence now exists to support the story.

At the end of the Second World War, when unexpectedly defeated in the general election of 1945, Winston Churchill was temporarily without a London home and took a suite at Claridge's.

In December 1951, West German chancellor Konrad Adenauer secretly met World Jewish Congress president Nahum Goldmann at Claridge's to begin negotiations on German reparations to Jewish survivors of the Holocaust.

== Restaurants and other facilities ==
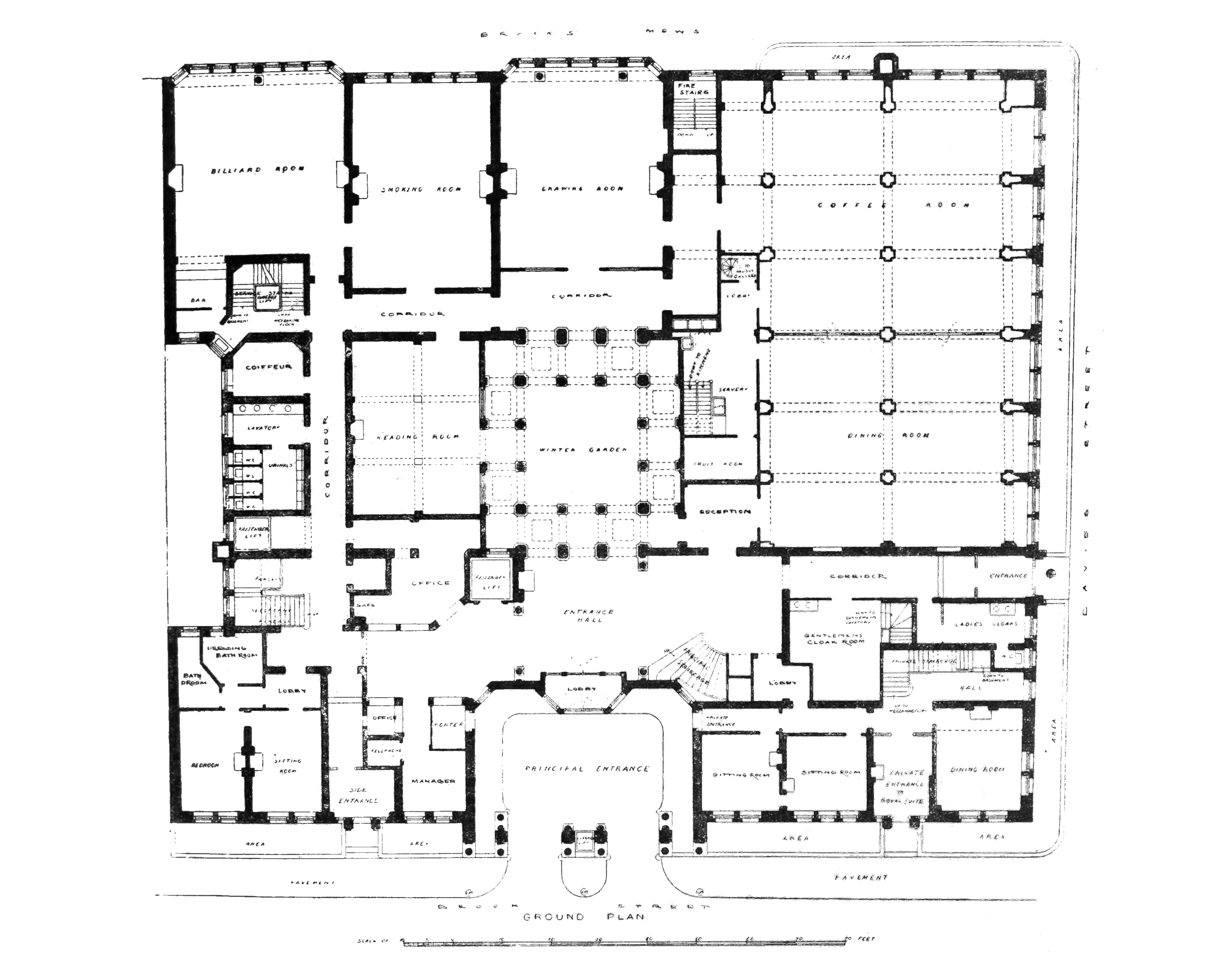
Ground floor plan of the hotel from 1898

Claridge's has been described as London's most "food centric hotel". It offers afternoon tea in The Foyer and Reading Room. There are three public ground floor bars; Claridge’s Bar acts as the main bar, when not being used for afternoon tea; The Fumoir, a former cigar bar until the smoking ban prohibited indoor smoking in 2007; and the Painter's Room, opened in 2021. A cafe at the back of the hotel opened in 2023 called The ArtSpace Café which has an extensive gallery space beneath it.

Davies and Brook, with head chef Daniel Humm, closed in 2021 after Humm proposed a vegan-only menu similar to that of Eleven Madison Park, his three-star Michelin restaurant in New York. The hotel received criticism for "not moving with the times". In 2023, the hotel opened Claridge's Restaurant in the same space.

For 12 years until June 2013, the fine dining main restaurant was run by Gordon Ramsay. Gordon Ramsay at Claridge's lost its Michelin status in January 2010. The restaurant closed in 2013 after having "lost its way". Harden's guide rated the restaurant second in London for "most disappointing cooking" and fourth for "most overpriced restaurant" in 2010.

In 2014, Claridge's went on to replace Ramsay's restaurant with Fera, which means 'Wild' in Latin. It was run by chef Simon Rogan. Fera was awarded a Michelin star in 2015 and Rogan left the restaurant in May 2017, leaving the restaurant's head chef Matt Starling in charge. Following Rogan's departure, the restaurant closed in December 2018.

For 10 days in 2012, the hotel hosted the restaurant Noma, while the restaurant in Copenhagen was closed for refurbishment. Owner René Redzepi and his head chef and staff from Noma served a £195-per-head nine-course New Nordic Cuisine menu that included scones and clotted cream, Lancashire hotpot with British ingredients, and live ants foraged in Denmark and flown to London.

In 2021, Claridge's opened an art deco bar in the Painter's Room featuring art work by Annie Morris.

== Artistic installations ==
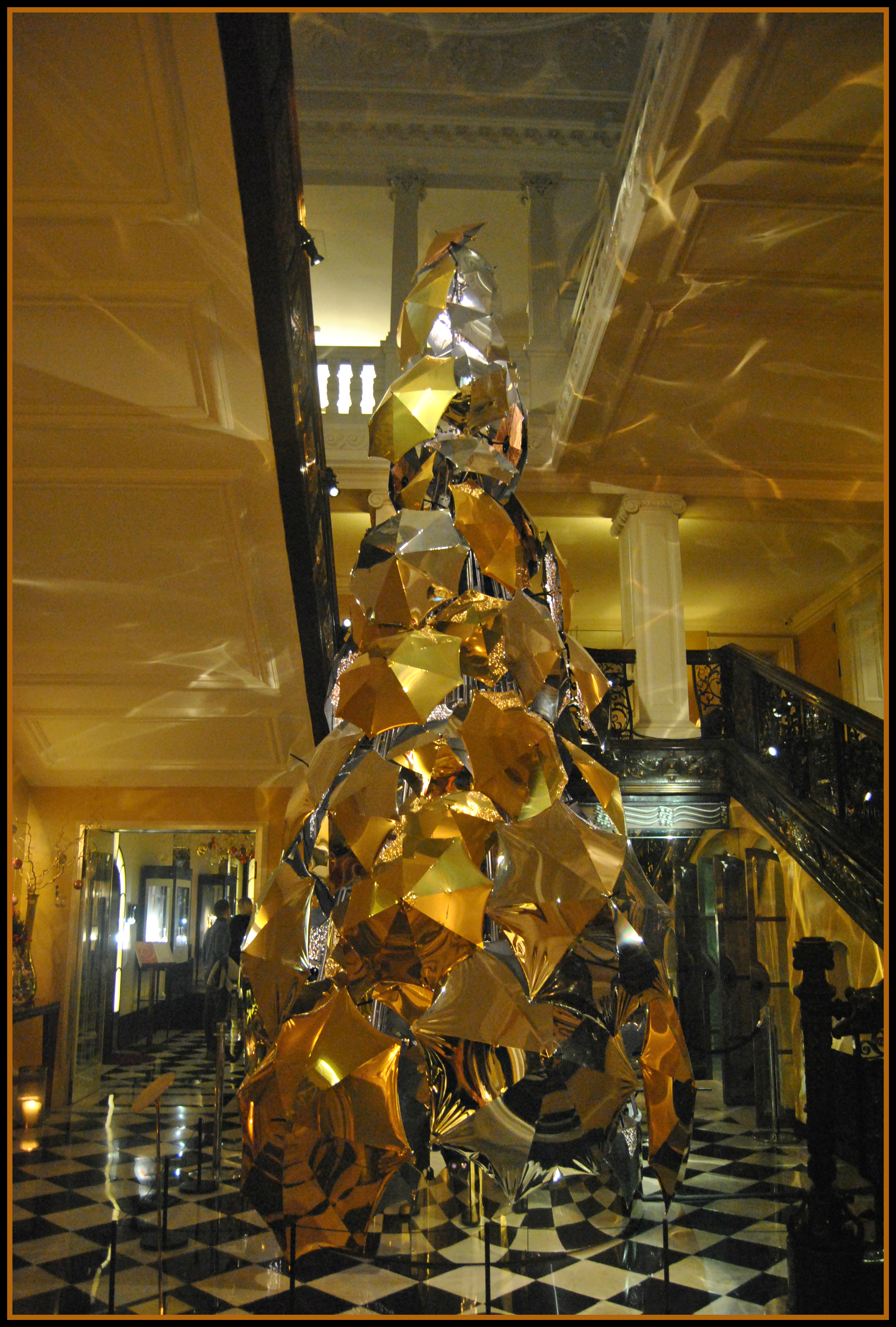
The 2015 Claridge's tree by Burberry's Christopher Bailey

Claridge's built an art gallery and started an artist in residence programme; illustrator David Downton became the first artist in residence in 2011. Downton created the Talking Heads Gallery, which displayed sketches from guests including Kristin Scott Thomas, Sarah Jessica Parker and Thandiwe Newton.

The hotel hired artist Damien Hirst, and over 200 of his prints were installed in guest rooms. During the Frieze Art Fair in 2019, Hirst's sculptures were displayed in the lobby. In 2021, a skylight designed by Hirst featuring butterflies was installed, and Claridge's Art Space opened and included an exhibition by Hirst and others. Since 2023, Claridge's rooftop penthouse suite has been housing 75 works by Hirst.

Illustrations by artist Annie Morris are painted directly on the walls of the Painter's Room bar.

The Christmas tree in the lobby is designed annually by artists, designers or fashion houses; these have included Diane von Furstenberg, Karl Lagerfeld, Christian Louboutin, Jimmy Choo, Burberry and Dolce & Gabbana. In 2015, Christopher Bailey decorated the tree with around 100 umbrellas, and 77,000 lights triggered by passersby.

== See also ==
- Inside Claridge's (British documentary television series)
