= Sir James Reid, 1st Baronet =

British doctor

Sir James Reid Bt., GCVO, KCB, VD, JP
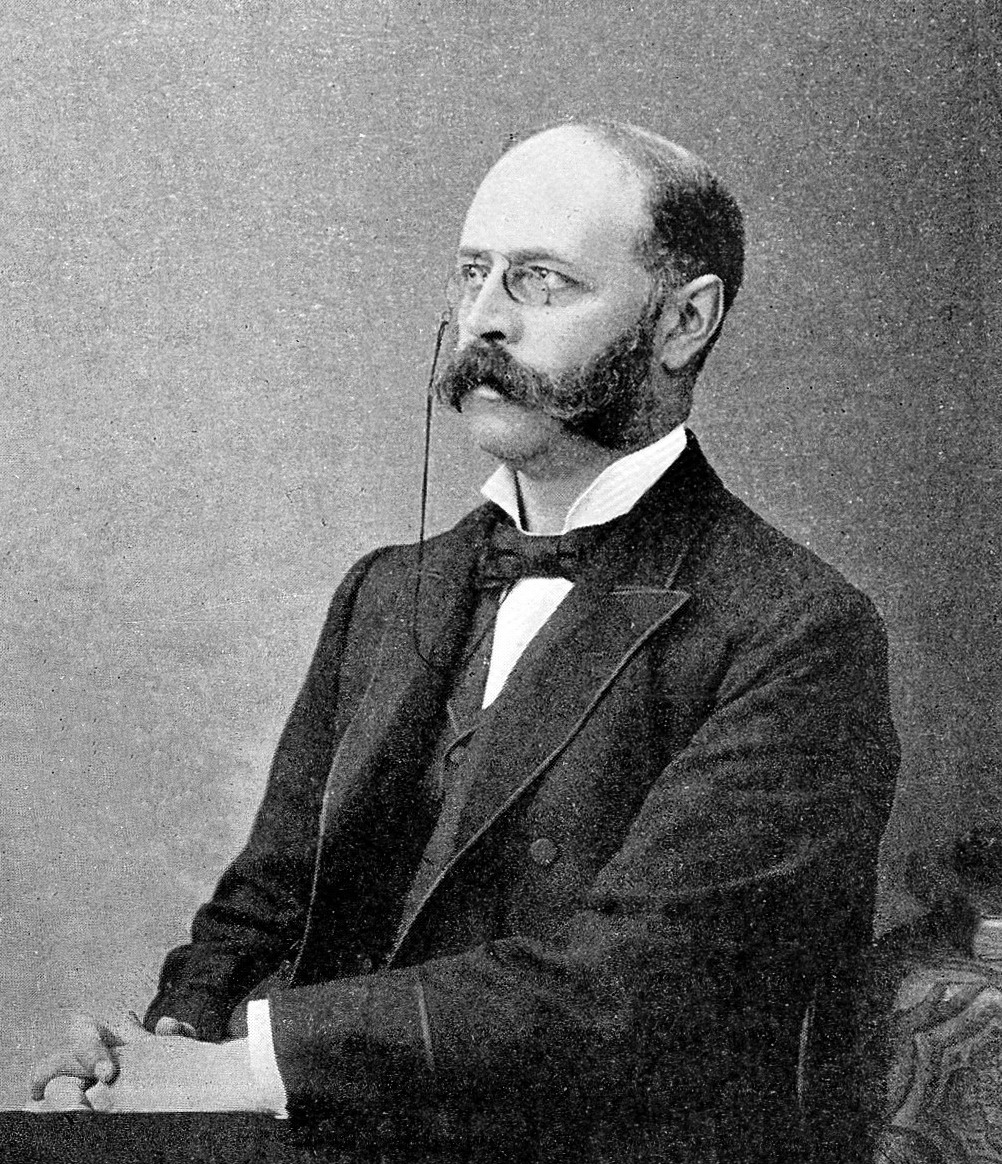
- Born: 23 October 1849; Ellon, Aberdeenshire, Scotland
- Died: 28 June 1923 (aged 73); London, England
- Education: University of Aberdeen
- Known for: Physician-in-ordinary to Queen Victoria, King Edward VII and King George V
- Medical career
- Profession: Physician

Sir James Reid, 1st Baronet GCVO KCB VD JP (23 October 1849 – 28 June 1923) was a British doctor who served as physician-in-ordinary to three British monarchs: Queen Victoria, King Edward VII and King George V.

At the age of 31, Reid was given medical charge of the Royal Household at Balmoral. Queen Victoria became increasingly dependent upon Reid as she grew older, and he accompanied her everywhere. He also attended to members of the royal family, and delivered several of Victoria's grandchildren.

== Early life and education ==
James Reid was born in Ellon in the north of Aberdeenshire, Scotland on 23 October 1849, the eldest son of James Reid and his wife Beatrice Peter. He was educated at Aberdeen Grammar School before gaining admission to the University of Aberdeen, where he was a gold medallist.

In 1869, he gained his master's degree in natural sciences and in 1872 his medical degree. After two years of practising medicine in London, he travelled to Vienna, then a seat for elite medical training, where for two years he attended various medical courses covering gynaecology, diseases of the ear, nose and throat, skin disease, eye disease and syphilis, in addition to learning German. In 1877, he returned to Scotland and joined his father's practice in Ellon, where he worked for the next three years.

== Royal Household ==
In April 1881, Reid was approached by Alexander Profeit, the queen's Factor at Balmoral. As a physician, a Scotsman from Aberdeenshire and able to speak German, Reid fulfilled Queen Victoria's chief criteria for resident medical attendant under the supervision of her then physician-in-ordinary, Sir William Jenner. After the queen interviewed Reid on 8 June 1881 at Balmoral, he was hired on a starting salary of £400 per year, and, aged 31, given medical charge of the Royal Household when it resided at Balmoral. Following the death of William Marshall, the resident physician to the queen, Reid was appointed to a permanent position and moved to London. In 1887, he was appointed physician-extraordinary to the queen and, two years later, he succeeded Sir William as physician-in-ordinary.

The queen became increasingly dependent upon Reid as she grew older. He accompanied her everywhere and reported to her every morning to enquire as to her health. She wrote to him every day and, when asked for advice by members of the Household, it became common for her to reply "ask Sir James". She consulted with him during her grief following the death of John Brown in 1883. Reid delivered several of the queen's grandchildren, including Charles Edward, the son of Prince Leopold, and Princess Beatrice's children; Alexander Mountbatten, 1st Marquess of Carisbrooke, Victoria Eugenie, Queen of Spain, Lord Leopold Mountbatten and Prince Maurice of Battenberg.

As physician to the queen, and at her instruction, Reid also attended to her "Munshi", Abdul Karim. In 1894, along with others, he protested against the role of Karim in Queen Victoria's life. On the question of Karim's background, Reid noted in his diary that John W. Tyler, superintendent at the central jail in Agra, had informed him that he "had constantly seen the Munshi's wife and female relations in India, as they were never shut up there from public gaze, belonging as they do to quite a low class; and that the idea of their being in purdah was never dreamt of until they came to England as ladies". In later years, Reid would become the main communicator between the Royal Household and the queen in matters relating to the Munshi.

He attended to the queen at Osborne House, the royal residence on the Isle of Wight, during her final ten days . As the queen's condition deteriorated, her daughters Helena, Louise and Beatrice were in attendance, later joined by their brother Bertie, the Prince of Wales. Reid helped them to accept and come to terms with the impending death of their mother. Reid had previously prescribed for the queen chlorodyne (chloral hydrate) for insomnia and the sedative Trional for arthritic pain, but there is no record that either of these was prescribed in the queen's final illness. On 17 January, Reid asked Sir Richard Douglas Powell, physician-in-ordinary, for his advice and as the queen's condition deteriorated further, asked Sir Thomas Barlow to attend to provide further medical support. The queen died on 22 January 1901, at half past six in the evening. Reid was given strict instructions as to burying the queen, including grave goods that had belonged to John Brown.

Reid then became physician-in-ordinary to Edward VII throughout the whole of that king's reign, and then finally to George V.

In March 1909 Edward VII fell ill. He suffered from chronic bronchitis, the result of smoking around twenty cigarettes and several cigars each day. Reid recommended a dose of radium and told Kaiser Wilhelm II, the king's nephew, that the king "was rapidly sinking." On 6 March 1910, the king was treated for "acute cardiac distress" (heart disease). Reid diagnosed an acute exacerbation of the chronic bronchitis, but he decided to hide the potential seriousness of this from the royal family and by 25 March, gave him a clean bill of health although the king was permanently wheezing, asthmatic, and could not walk upstairs. The king went on holiday to France but returned on 27 April. By 5 May, the king was turning blue, and Reid issued a bulletin saying that the king's condition was "causing some anxiety", and a few hours later announced that it was causing "grave anxiety." The king died soon afterwards, just before midnight.

== Later life ==
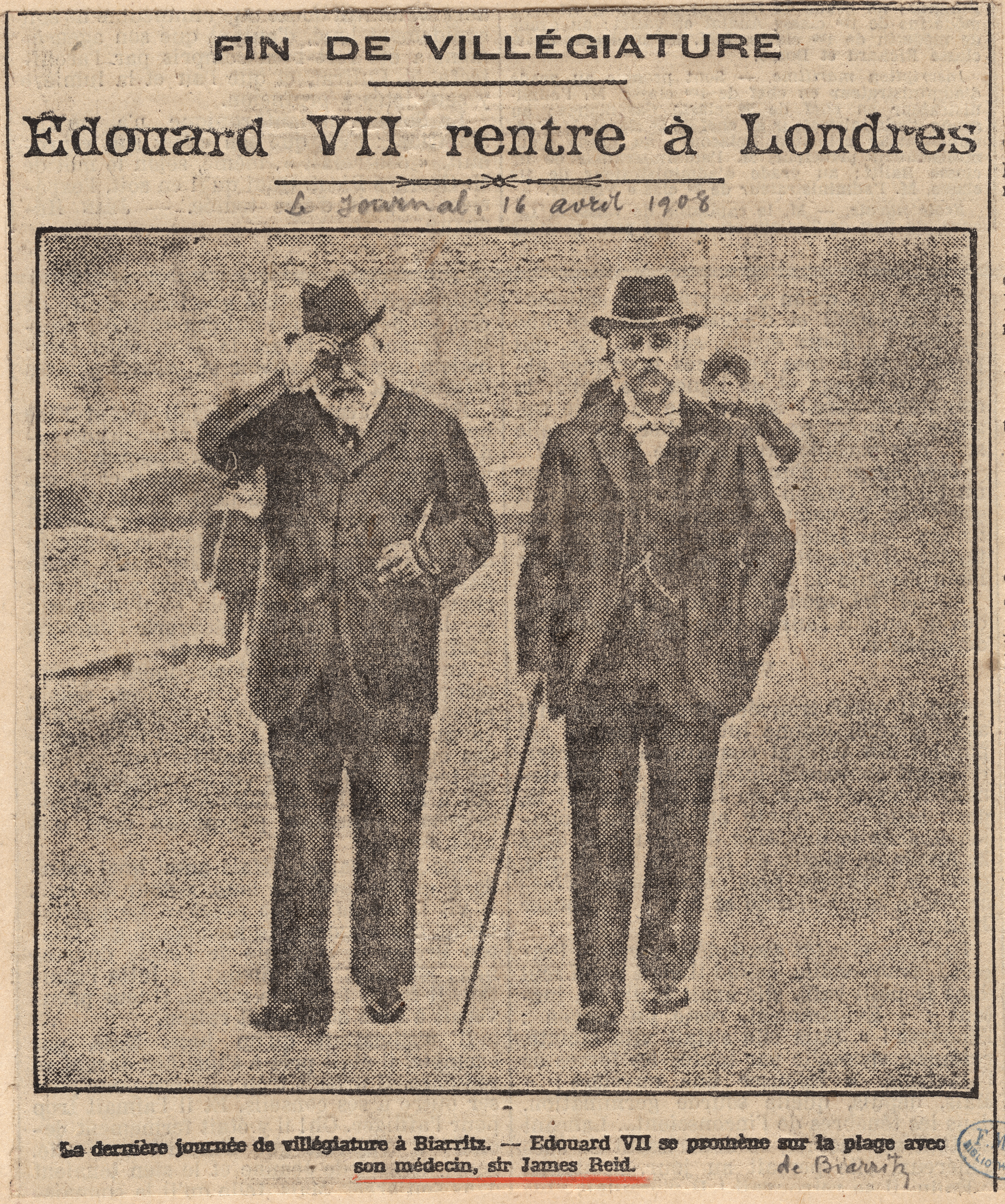
Edward VII and Sir James

Reid became consulting physician to the King Edward VII Sanatorium at Midhurst.

In 1914 Reid, although by then retired, received instructions from London to travel to Wick, northern Scotland to meet Prince Albert ("Bertie", 1895–1952), second son of George V and the future King George VI. The prince had been taken ill with abdominal pain whilst serving as a midshipman on HMS Collingwood. Reid accompanied the prince as he was transferred to Aberdeen on the hospital ship Rohilla. On 9 September an appendectomy was performed on the prince by the Regius Professor of Surgery in Aberdeen Sir John Marnoch, who was surgeon to the Royal Household in Scotland. Reid was present at the operation along with Sir Alexander Ogston. The prince made a good recovery from the procedure, returning to serve on HMS Collingwood at the Battle of Jutland.

== Personal and family ==
Reid married, in 1899, the Honourable Susan Baring (9 October 1870 – 8 February 1961), daughter of Edward Baring, 1st Baron Revelstoke. She had been maid of honour to Queen Victoria in 1898–1899. They had two daughters and two sons:

- Sir Edward Reid, 2nd Baronet (1901–1972).
- Admiral Sir John Peter Lorne Reid (1903–1973), a Royal Navy officer.
- Margaret Cecilia Reid (1904-1937).
- Victoria Susan Beatrice Reid (1908–1997); married Rev. Leonard St. Clare Ingrams (1900–1953), in 1935 and left children.

== Awards and honours ==
In 1889, Reid was created Companion of the Most Honourable Order of the Bath (CB), He then became Knight Commander of the Most Honourable Order of the Bath (KCB) in 1895, a baronet in 1897, and in 1901 was made Knight Grand Cross of the Royal Victorian Order (GCVO)

He received the Prussian Order of the Crown (2nd Class), given during the visit of Emperor Wilhelm II to the United Kingdom at the time of the death and funeral of Queen Victoria in January–February 1901.

Among other awards were honorary doctorates MD from the Royal University of Ireland in April 1900, when he was in Dublin during the visit of Queen Victoria to Ireland; and LL.D from the University of Glasgow, awarded to Reid in June 1901 during the university's 450th jubilee celebrations.

=== Arms ===
In 1911, Reid, was allowed to add one of the lions from the royal arms to his personal armorial bearings. The notice in The London Gazette said:

Whitehall, June 19, 1911. The KING has been pleased, by Warrant under His Majesty’s Royal Sign Manual, bearing date the 14th instant, to give and grant unto Sir James Reid, Baronet, G.C.V.O., K.C.B., one of His Majesty’s Physicians in Ordinary, Physician in Ordinary to His late Majesty King Edward the Seventh and to Her late Majesty Queen Victoria, im consideration of services rendered to His Majesty’s dearly beloved father, Royal Licence and Authority that. he, ‘the said Sir James Reid, and his descendants, may bear to his and their Armorial Ensigns the Honourable Augmentation following; that is to say-: On a chief Gules a Lion passant guardant Or armed and langued Azure (being one of the Lions from the Royal Arms): Provided the said Honourable Augmentation be first duly exemplified according to the Laws of Arms and recorded in the College of Arms.

== Death and legacy ==
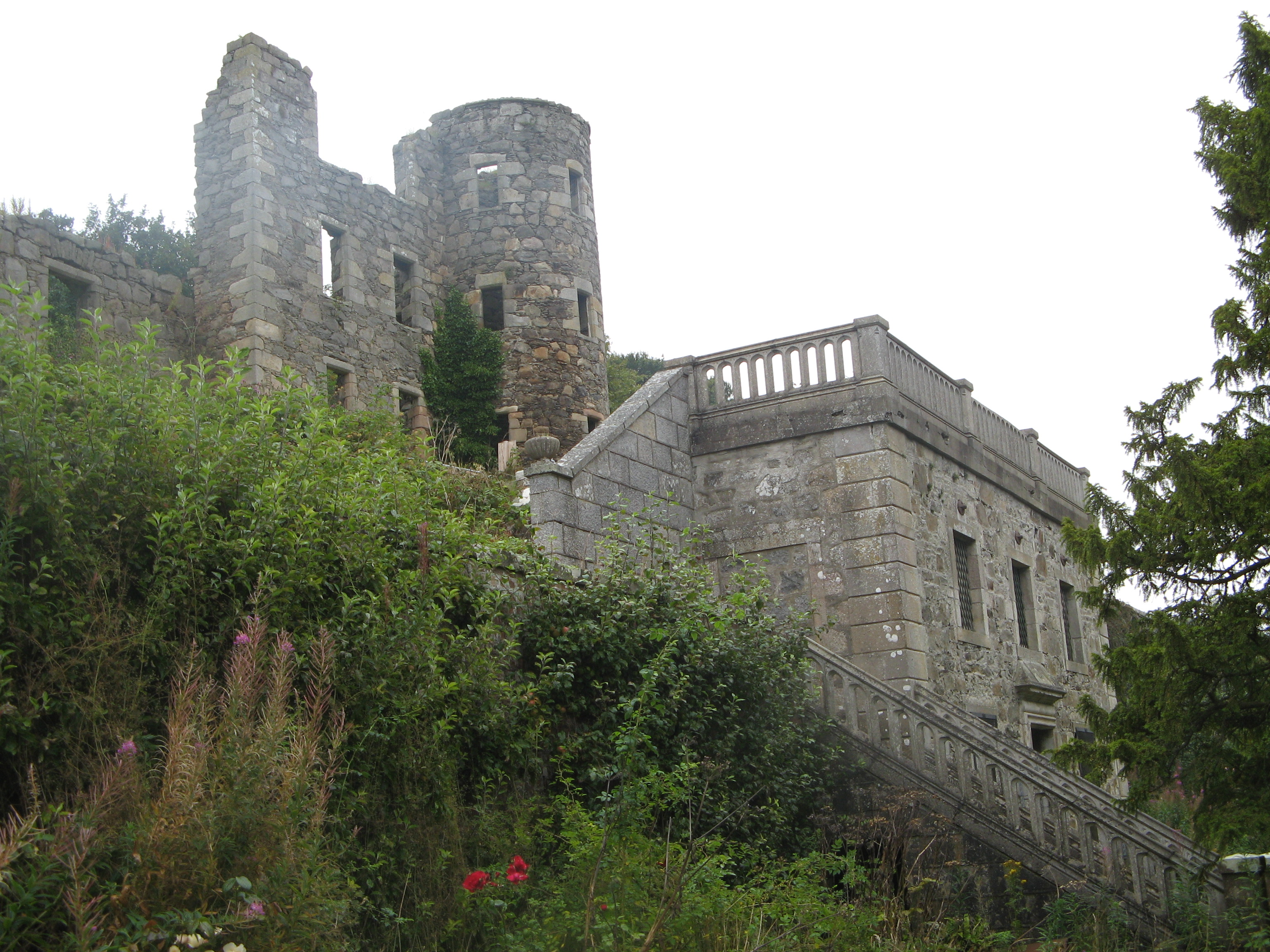
Ellon Castle, Aberdeenshire

Still in post, Reid died in London on 29 June 1923, five weeks after an acute attack of phlebitis, at the age of 73. Lord Stamfordham wrote in The Times: "Among the remarkable men of the later Victorian group, Sir James Reid stood somehow or other by himself. The niche which he created and filled remains in the truest sense inimitable." Reid was buried at the Cemetery in his hometown, Ellon.

Ellon Castle in Aberdeenshire was inherited by Reid's grandson, whose wife Michaela Reid found his diaries, which she used to compile a biography of Reid, titled Ask Sir James, published in 1987. The historian and writer Shrabani Basu used Reid's personal diaries, scrapbooks and photographs when researching her book Victoria and Abdul: The True Story of the Queen’s Closest Confidant, in which are several photographs from the Reid archives. In the 2017 film Victoria & Abdul, based on Basu's book, Reid was portrayed by actor Paul Higgins.

Baronetage of the United Kingdom
New creation	Baronet (of Ellon); 1897–1923	Succeeded by Edward James Reid
