= Derek Quinlan =

Irish businessman and property developer

- Born: Derek Michael Quinlan; 4 November 1947 (age 78); Dublin, Ireland
- Occupations: Accountant and real estate investor, former tax inspector
- Years active: 1989-present
- Known for: Quinlan Private

Derek M Quinlan (born 4 November 1947) is an Irish businessman prominent in the field of real estate investment and development. A former tax inspector at the Irish Revenue Commission, he formed investment syndicates with high-net-worth individuals to acquire investment properties across the world. His principal investment vehicle was Quinlan Private, a private equity firm with offices in Dublin, London and New York.

Quinlan's period of greatest prominence and success coincided with the peak of the global real estate bubble in 2004–2007. In 2009, he resigned from Quinlan Private and moved to Switzerland on the advice of KPMG. His loans have since been transferred to NAMA (National Asset Management Agency) and various assets have been sold, including artwork from his private collection. In September 2014, it was reported that he had reduced his debts by more than €3bn through a series of asset sales over the previous five years.

In 2017 Quinlan returned to the European property market acting as an adviser for several deals, including one of the largest property bids in European history worth an estimated £5 bn.

In November 2022 he declared himself bankrupt in the High Court in London.

== Life and career ==
Quinlan was born in Dublin in 1947, the son of an Army Officer. He attended Blackrock College and University College Dublin. He began his career as an accountant with Coopers & Lybrand (now PwC) before joining the Irish Revenue Commissioners as a tax inspector. In 1989 he went into private practice, founding Quinlan Private as an asset management firm for high-net-worth individuals. He specialised in investing in tax designated areas in the 1990s in Ireland supporting Irish government policy in relation to property renewal, regeneration and job creation.

=== Business difficulties ===
The 2008 financial crisis severely impacted Quinlan's liquidity. In 2009, Quinlan resigned from Quinlan Private and moved to Switzerland on the advice of KPMG with the company later rebranding as Avestus Capital.

In April 2011 a receiver was appointed on behalf of the National Assets Management Agency (NAMA) to take charge of a number of properties owned by Quinlan, after he had failed to repay loans to the agency totalling hundreds of millions of Euros. In September 2014, the Sunday Independent reported that he had reduced his debts by more than €3bn, the biggest single repayment of debt by a single borrower owed to the National Asset Management Agency and other banks.

In November 2022 he declared himself bankrupt in the High Court in London.

=== Personal life ===
Quinlan has lived in Dublin, London, Switzerland and Abu Dhabi. As of 2016, he resides mainly in Monaco and Dublin.

== Notable transactions ==
From the early 2000s Quinlan Private began to be involved in significant land and asset deals throughout Europe and North America. By 2008, it was reported that Quinlan Private had more than €10 billion worth of assets under management.

=== Savoy Group Hotels and Wentworth Golf Club ===
In 2004, Quinlan gained 1% ownership of Wentworth Club, one of the most exclusive golf courses in Britain, through the Savoy deal. Also in 2004, Quinlan headed an investment syndicate that bought The Savoy Group for £750 million, giving it control of landmark London hotels including Claridges, The Connaught Hotel and The Savoy Hotel. Quinlan outbid competing buyers, including Saudi Prince Alwaleed Bin Talal. Some months later, Quinlan sold The Savoy Hotel to the Saudi prince for £250 million, while retaining the other hotels in the group, subsequently renamed The Maybourne Hotel Group.

=== Knightsbridge Estate ===
In 2005, Quinlan Private won the financier the deal of the year award at the Variety Club property awards for the Knightsbridge Estate acquisition. The same year, a group of investors led by Quinlan outbid the Abu Dhabi royal family to acquire a £530 million Knightsbridge estate, including retail, hotels, offices and residential properties.

=== Central and Eastern Europe ===
In 2008, Quinlan Private joined up with Chicago property company Golub Capital to set up Quinlan Private Golub, an investment fund targeting eastern Europe.

=== Spain ===
Quinlan Private purchased the €300m Diagonal Mar shopping centre in Barcelona in 2006, representing Spain's largest yet single property transaction.

In 2007, Quinlan was a co-investor in the acquisition of the Madrid headquarters building of Banco Santander for €1.9 billion. Quinlan and former business partner Glenn Maud bought the offices in a deal mainly funded by various loans. Edgeworth Capital, a fund owned by Robert Tchenguiz, and Aabar, the Abu Dhabi sovereign wealth fund, subsequently acquired one of the loans, and in February 2019 Edgeworth submitted a bankruptcy petition against Quinlan.

=== Irish Glass Bottle site ===
In the same year, Quinlan was investor in another syndicate that bought the Irish Glass Bottle development site in Dublin's Ringsend for €413 million. Anglo-Irish Bank was the principal lender. As of 2009, the site remained undeveloped and the value was written down to €60 million. In 2010, Anglo-Irish Bank's loan on the site was transferred to Ireland's National Asset Management Agency.

=== Jurys Inns ===
In 2007, Quinlan Private acquired Irish hotel chain Jurys Inns for €1.165 billion. Some months later, Quinlan obtained a €200 million investment in Jurys from the sovereign wealth fund of Oman, as part of a plan for further international expansion of the chain.

In April 2007, Quinlan's investment firm acquired a portfolio of 47 Marriott hotels in the UK for £1.1bn.

=== 25 Canada Square ===
In 2007, the firm acquired the Citigroup headquarters at 25 Canada Square for £1 billion, in a joint venture with PropInvest. The building now forms part of the Citigroup Centre, London.

=== Bank of Ireland headquarters ===
In 2008, Quinlan led a consortium that acquired the Bank of Ireland Headquarters (later renamed Miesian Plaza) in Lower Baggot Street, Dublin, for €180 million.

=== Finance Tower, Brussels ===
In June 2017, it was reported that Quinlan was advising a consortium of European investors on an estimated €1.3 billion bid to buy Finance Tower, the Brussels building that houses the Belgian finance ministry. His new firm Quinlan Real Estate lead the bid. The deal was the largest in Belgian history and the second largest single-property sale in Europe that year after the sale of Coeur Défense in Paris.

=== Facebook headquarters, Dublin ===
In 2018, Quinlan's wife Siobhán emerged as a joint shareholder of a multimillion-euro prime site in Ballsbridge that was earmarked to become Facebook's international headquarters. The original site which had housed the headquarters of AIB, had been acquired in 2015 for €67.5 million. Planning permission to build a high-end office block was subsequently secured and the value of the site increased to €120 million. Quinlan then sold her stake to Los Angeles-based real estate investment group Colony Capital.
