= Reid baronets =

Set index for Reid baronets

There have been five baronetcies created for persons with the surname Reid, one in the Baronetage of Nova Scotia and four in the Baronetage of the United Kingdom. As of 2026 one creation is extant.

- Reid baronets of Barra (1703)
- Reid baronets of Ewell Grove (1823)
- Reid baronets of Ellon (1897)
- Reid baronets of Springburn and Kilmaurs (1922)
- Reid baronets of Rademon (1936): see Sir David Reid, 1st Baronet (1872–1939)

== See also ==
- Reade baronets
