= Reid baronets of Springburn and Kilmaurs =

Escutcheon of the Reid baronets of Springburn and Kilmaurs

The Reid baronetcy, of Springburn in the County of the City of Glasgow and of Kilmaurs in the County of Ayr, was created in the Baronetage of the United Kingdom on 26 January 1922 for Hugh Reid. He was chairman and managing director of the North British Locomotive Company. The title became extinct on the death of the 3rd Baronet in 2012.

== Reid baronets, of Springburn and Kilmaurs (1922) ==
- Sir Hugh Reid, 1st Baronet (1860–1935)
- Sir Douglas Neilson Reid, 2nd Baronet (1898–1971)
- Sir Hugh Reid, 3rd Baronet (1933–2012)
