= Walpole (trade association) =

UK luxury goods trade association

The Walpole Committee Limited
- Formation: 1990; 36 years ago
- Founded at: London, England
- Type: Trade association
- Purpose: Promotion and representation of the British luxury goods sector
- Headquarters: London, England
- Members: c. 270 British brands
- Chief executive: Helen Brocklebank
- Website: www.thewalpole.co.uk

The Walpole Committee Limited is a British trade association for the luxury goods sector. It represents around 270 British brands – including Rolls-Royce, Burberry, Claridge's and Harrods – and lobbies on their behalf in the United Kingdom and the European Union.

== History ==
The organisation was founded in 1990 as the Churchill Group by a group of British companies, including British Airways, Coutts, DAKS Simpson, the Savoy Group and the Financial Times. It was renamed Walpole in 1992 after Robert Walpole. In 2005, it changed its stated focus from promoting British excellence to representing the luxury sector, and it began lobbying in Westminster and Brussels.

Walpole held the first of its annual awards for British luxury brands in 2001.

In 2010, Walpole joined trade bodies in Italy (Altagamma), France (Comité Colbert), Germany (Meisterkreis) and Spain (Circulo Fortuny) to form the European Cultural and Creative Industries Alliance. The Financial Times reported in 2012 that the European Commission had begun treating luxury goods as a distinct sector.

In 2013, Walpole formed a partnership with London Business School to run seminars and projects for MBA students. Its then chief executive, Julia Carrick, was appointed OBE in the 2014 New Year Honours for services to British industry.

Following the 2016 referendum on EU membership, chief executive Helen Brocklebank said in a 2018 interview with CNBC that although most customers for high-end British products were outside Europe, many brands relied on European supply chains. The organisation ran its first trade mission to New York in 2017, and the then Secretary of State for International Trade, Liam Fox, joined its New York delegation the following year.

A 2019 report commissioned by Walpole from the consultancy Frontier Economics estimated the value of the UK high-end sector at £48 billion.

In January 2020, Walpole published a British Luxury Sustainability Manifesto, produced with McKinsey & Company, which was signed by brands including Harrods, Burberry and Dunhill. Its first sustainability report followed in 2021.

== Brands of Tomorrow ==
Walpole launched Brands of Tomorrow in 2007, a mentoring programme for British companies with a turnover below £5 million. Participants have included the watchmaker Bremont, the jeweller Astley Clarke, the retailer Wolf & Badger and the fashion label GOAT. The designer Emilia Wickstead took part in the London Business School programme before being selected as a Brand of Tomorrow in 2015.
