= A Message from Mars =

A Message from Mars may refer to:

- A Message from Mars (play), 1899 by Richard Ganthony, or the following films based on that play:
  - A Message from Mars (1903 film), a New Zealand short film
  - A Message from Mars (1913 film), a British science fiction film directed by J. Wallett Waller
  - A Message from Mars (1921 film), an American fantasy comedy film directed by Maxwell Karger
