= 1832 =

1832 in various calendars
- Gregorian calendar: 1832; MDCCCXXXII
- Ab urbe condita: 2585
- Armenian calendar: 1281; ԹՎ ՌՄՁԱ
- Assyrian calendar: 6582
- Balinese saka calendar: 1753–1754
- Bengali calendar: 1238–1239
- Berber calendar: 2782
- British Regnal year: 2 Will. 4 – 3 Will. 4
- Buddhist calendar: 2376
- Burmese calendar: 1194
- Byzantine calendar: 7340–7341
- Chinese calendar: 辛卯年 (Metal Rabbit); 4529 or 4322 — to — 壬辰年 (Water Dragon); 4530 or 4323
- Coptic calendar: 1548–1549
- Discordian calendar: 2998
- Ethiopian calendar: 1824–1825
- Hebrew calendar: 5592–5593
- Hindu calendars
- Vikram Samvat: 1888–1889
- Shaka Samvat: 1753–1754
- Kali Yuga: 4932–4933
- Holocene calendar: 11832
- Igbo calendar: 832–833
- Iranian calendar: 1210–1211
- Islamic calendar: 1247–1248
- Japanese calendar: Tenpō 3 (天保３年)
- Javanese calendar: 1759–1760
- Julian calendar: Gregorian minus 12 days
- Korean calendar: 4165
- Minguo calendar: 80 before ROC 民前80年
- Nanakshahi calendar: 364
- Thai solar calendar: 2374–2375
- Tibetan calendar: ལྕགས་མོ་ཡོས་ལོ་ (female Iron-Hare); 1958 or 1577 or 805 — to — ཆུ་ཕོ་འབྲུག་ལོ་ (male Water-Dragon); 1959 or 1578 or 806

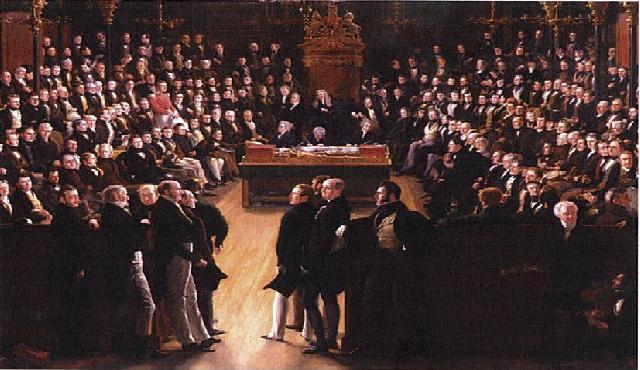
June 7: The Great Reform Act is passed by the British Parliament after long debate, changing the electoral process in England and Wales.The House of Commons, 1833 by George Hayter

November 24: U.S. state of South Carolina begins Nullification Crisis by asserting power to nullify U.S. government laws.

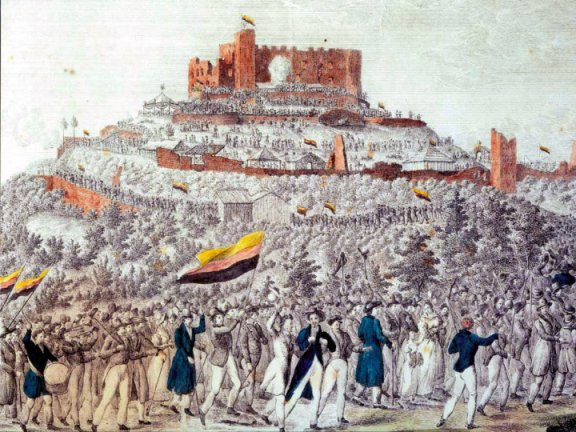
May 27: start of the Hambach Festival

1832 (MDCCCXXXII) was a leap year starting on Sunday of the Gregorian calendar and a leap year starting on Friday of the Julian calendar, the 1832nd year of the Common Era (CE) and Anno Domini (AD) designations, the 832nd year of the 2nd millennium, the 32nd year of the 19th century, and the 3rd year of the 1830s decade. As of the start of 1832, the Gregorian calendar was 12 days ahead of the Julian calendar, which remained in localized use until 1923.

== Events ==
=== January–March ===
- January 6 – Abolitionist William Lloyd Garrison founds the New-England Anti-Slavery Society.
- January 13 – The Christmas Rebellion of slaves is brought to an end in Jamaica, after the island's white planters organize militias and the British Army sends companies of the 84th regiment to enforce martial law. More than 300 of the slave rebels will be publicly hanged for their part in the destruction.
- February 6 – The Swan River Colony is renamed Western Australia.
- February 9 – The Florida Legislative Council grants a city charter for Jacksonville, Florida.
- February 12
  - Ecuador annexes the Galápagos Islands.
  - A cholera epidemic in London claims at least 3,000 lives; the contagion spreads to France and North America later this year.
- February 26 — Frédéric Chopin made his highly anticipated Paris debut on at the Salle Pleyel. The concert featured his own Piano Concerto in E Minor and Variations on 'Là ci darem la mano', and was attended by the city's musical and cultural elite, including Franz Liszt and Felix Mendelssohn. The concert would catapult him as one of the most popular composers in not only Paris but all of Europe.
- February 28 – Charles Darwin and the crew of HMS Beagle arrive at South America for the first time.
- March 24 – In Hiram, Ohio, a group of men beat, tar and feather Mormon leader Joseph Smith.

=== April–June ===
- April 6 – The Black Hawk War begins in the United States.
- May 7 – The Treaty of London creates an independent Kingdom of Greece. Otto of Wittelsbach, Prince of Bavaria, is chosen King; thus begins the history of modern Greece.
- May 10 – The Egyptians, aided by Maronites, seize Acre from the Ottoman Empire after a 7-month siege.
- May 11 – Greece is recognized as a sovereign nation; the Treaty of Constantinople ends the Greek War of Independence in July.
- May 16 – Juan Godoy discovers the rich silver outcrops of Chañarcillo sparking the Chilean silver rush.
- May 30
  - The Hambacher Fest, a demonstration for civil liberties and national unity in Germany, ends with no result.
  - The Rideau Canal in eastern Ontario (Canada) is opened.
- June 5–6 – The June Rebellion in France, anti-monarchist riots led chiefly by local students and workers, breaks out in Paris.
- June 7 – The Reform Act receives royal assent after passage by the British Parliament, reforming the electoral system and setting uniform law for voting rights in England and Wales, though not in Scotland or Ireland.
- June 9 – The Strasburg Rail Road is incorporated by the Pennsylvania State Legislature, making it the oldest continuously operating railroad in the Western Hemisphere.

=== July–September ===
- July 1 – Global conglomerate Jardine Matheson is founded in Canton (modern day Guangzhou) in Qing dynasty China by Scottish merchants.
- July 2 – André-Michel Guerry presents his Essay on moral statistics of France to the French Academy of Sciences, a significant step in the founding of empirical social science.
- July 4 – Durham University is founded in the north of England by an act of Parliament given royal assent by King William IV.
- July 9 – The Commissioner of Indian Affairs post is created within the United States Department of War.
- July 10 – The United States Survey of the Coast is revived within the Department of the Treasury.
- August 2 – The Bad Axe Massacre ends the last major Native American rebellion east of the Mississippi in the United States.
- August 7 – William Howley, Archbishop of Canterbury, has his coach attacked by an angry mob on his first official visit to Canterbury because of his opposition to the Reform Act in the United Kingdom.
- August 9 – Leopold I of Belgium marries the daughter of the French king Louise of Orléans in a dynastic marriage at the Château de Compiègne
- August 27 – Black Hawk (Sauk leader) surrenders to the United States authorities, ending the Black Hawk War.
- September 22 – Qasim al-Ahmad is appointed as the new Ottoman Governor (mutasallim) of Jerusalem (Kudüs), after Sultan Mahmud II dismisses Muhammad Said Agha.

=== October–December ===
- October 4 – Prince Otto of Bavaria, the second oldest son of King Ludwig I, is selected by Europe's major powers to become Othon, the first King of Greece, after the Hellenic nation's reacquisition of independence.
- October 20 – Principal Chief Levi Colbert (Itawamba Mingo) and other leaders of the Chickasaw Nation of American Indians sign the Treaty of Pontotoc Creek with the United States, ceding their remaining 9,400 square miles of land to the U.S., in return for a promise that they will receive all proceeds of sales of the land by the federal government to private owners, along with expenses for relocation and food and supplies for one year. The area ceded includes the entire northern one-sixth of the state of Mississippi.
- October 29 - Alpha Delta Phi, the sixth-oldest college fraternity, is founded as a literary society by Samuel Eells at Hamilton College in Clinton, New York.
- November 21 – Wabash College, a small, private, liberal arts college for men, is founded.
- November 24 – Nullification Crisis: The U.S. state of South Carolina passes the Ordinance of Nullification, challenging the power of the U.S. federal government, by declaring that it will not enforce national tariffs signed into law in 1828 and 1832.
- December 3 – 1832 United States presidential election: Andrew Jackson is re-elected president.
- December 4 – Siege of Antwerp: The last remaining Dutch stronghold, Antwerp Citadel, comes under French attack in the aftermath of the Belgian Revolution.
- December 10 – U.S. President Andrew Jackson responds to the Nullification Crisis by threatening to send the U.S. Army and Navy into South Carolina if it does not comply.
- December 21 – Battle of Konya: The Egyptians defeat the main Ottoman army in central Anatolia.
- December 23 – The Siege of Antwerp ends with the Dutch garrison losing the citadel.
- December 28 – John C. Calhoun becomes the first Vice President of the United States to resign.

=== Date unknown ===
- George Catlin starts to live among the Sioux in the Dakota Territory.
- The first Baedeker guidebook, Voyage du Rhin de Mayence à Cologne, is published in Koblenz.
- Publication begins (posthumously) of Carl von Clausewitz's Vom Kriege ("On War").
- The City of Buffalo in New York is incorporated.
- The Cumberland and Oxford Canal connects the largest lakes of southern Maine with the seaport of Portland, Maine.
- Global watch brand Longines is founded in Switzerland.
- The first commutator DC electric motor, capable of turning machinery, is demonstrated by William Sturgeon in London.
- A local guide working for British explorer B. H. Hodgson during a Himalayan expedition claimed to have spotted a large bipedal creature running away in fear. It would become the first sighting of the so-called Yeti.

== Births ==
=== January–February ===
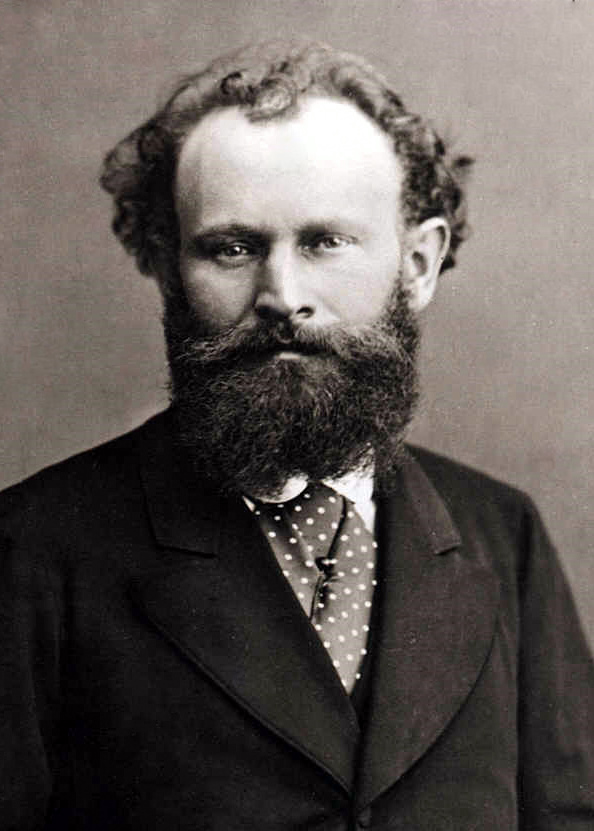
Édouard Manet

T. Muthuswamy Iyer

- January 1
  - Tom Jeffords, US Army scout and Indian agent (d. 1914)
  - Charles N. Felton, American banker and politician (d. 1914)
- January 4
  - Sir George Tryon, British admiral (d. 1893)
  - Antoine Chanzy, French general and governor of Algeria (d. 1883)
- January 6 – Gustave Doré, French painter, sculptor (d. 1883)
- January 13 – Horatio Alger, Jr., American Unitarian minister, author (d. 1899)
- January 21 – Carl Hubert von Wendt, German landowner and politician (d. 1903)
- January 22 – Alonzo B. Cornell, 27th Governor of New York (d. 1904)
- January 23
  - Édouard Manet, French painter (d. 1883)
  - Charlotte Pousette, Swedish stage actress (d. 1877)
- January 24
  - Joseph Hodges Choate, American lawyer and diplomat (d. 1917)
  - Albert Arnz, German landscape painter (d. 1914)
- January 25
  - Ivan Shishkin, Russian landscape painter (d. 1898)
  - Paul Bronsart von Schellendorff, Prussian general and writer (d. 1891)
- January 26 – George Shiras Jr., Associate Justice of the Supreme Court of the United States (d. 1924)
- January 27 – Lewis Carroll, English author (d. 1898)
- January 28 – Sir Charles Gough, British general, Victoria Cross recipient (d. 1912)
- January 28
  - T. Muthuswamy Iyer, Lawyer, first Indian Judge of the Madras high court (d. 1895)
  - Franz Wüllner, German composer and conductor (d. 1902)
- January 29 – Wilhelm Böckmann, German architect (d. 1902)
- January 30 – Infanta Luisa Fernanda of Spain, Duchess of Montpensier (d. 1897)
- February 6 – John B. Gordon, attorney, slaveholding planter, general in the Confederate States Army, and politician (d. 1904)
- February 9 – Adele Spitzeder, German actress, folk singer and confidence trickster (d. 1895)
- February 18 – Octave Chanute, French-American engineer, aviation pioneer (d. 1910)
- February 21 – Louis Maurer, German-American lithographer, and the father of painter Alfred Henry Maurer (d. 1932)
- February 26 – John George Nicolay, German-American author, diplomat, and private secretary to Abraham Lincoln (d. 1901)

=== March–April ===
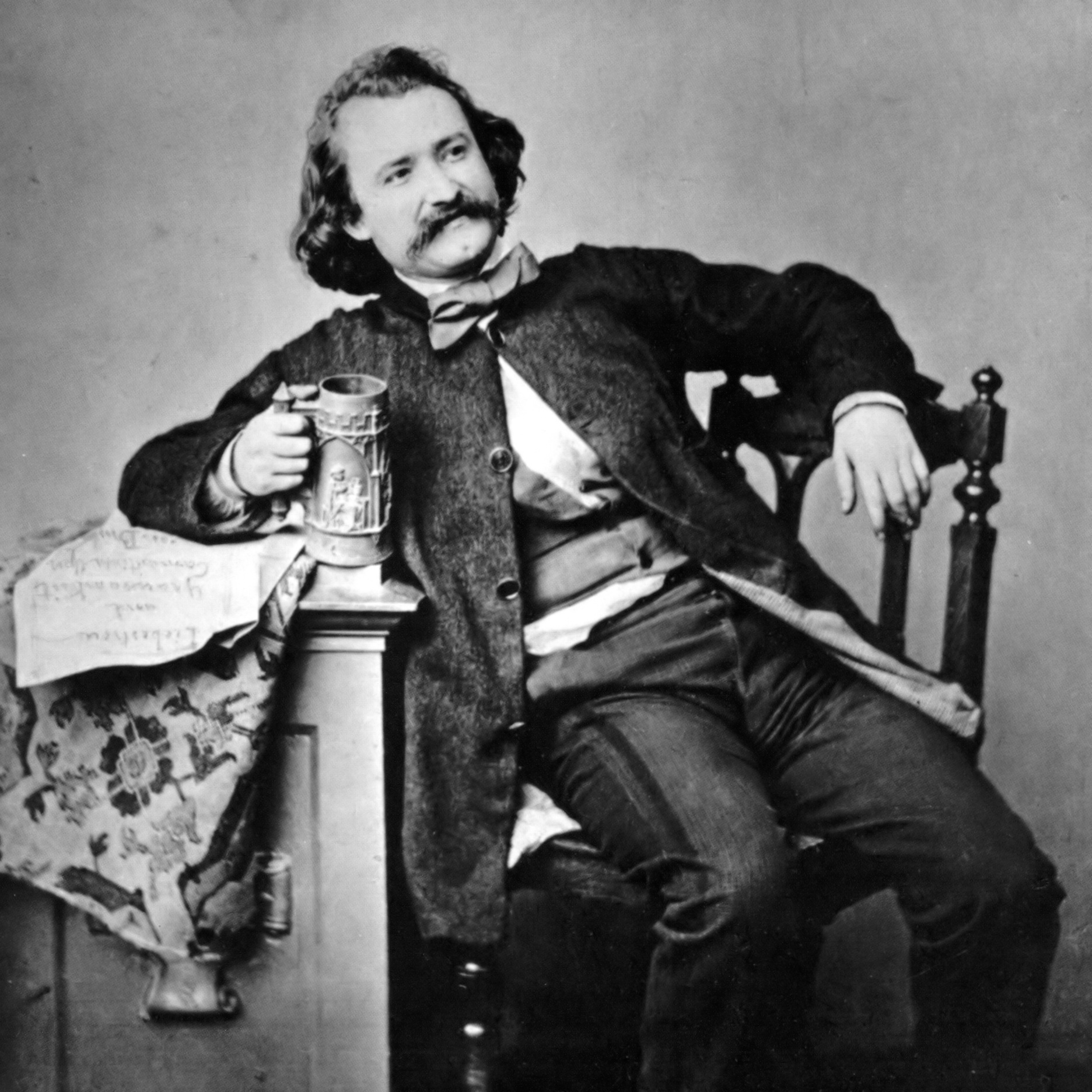
Wilhelm Busch

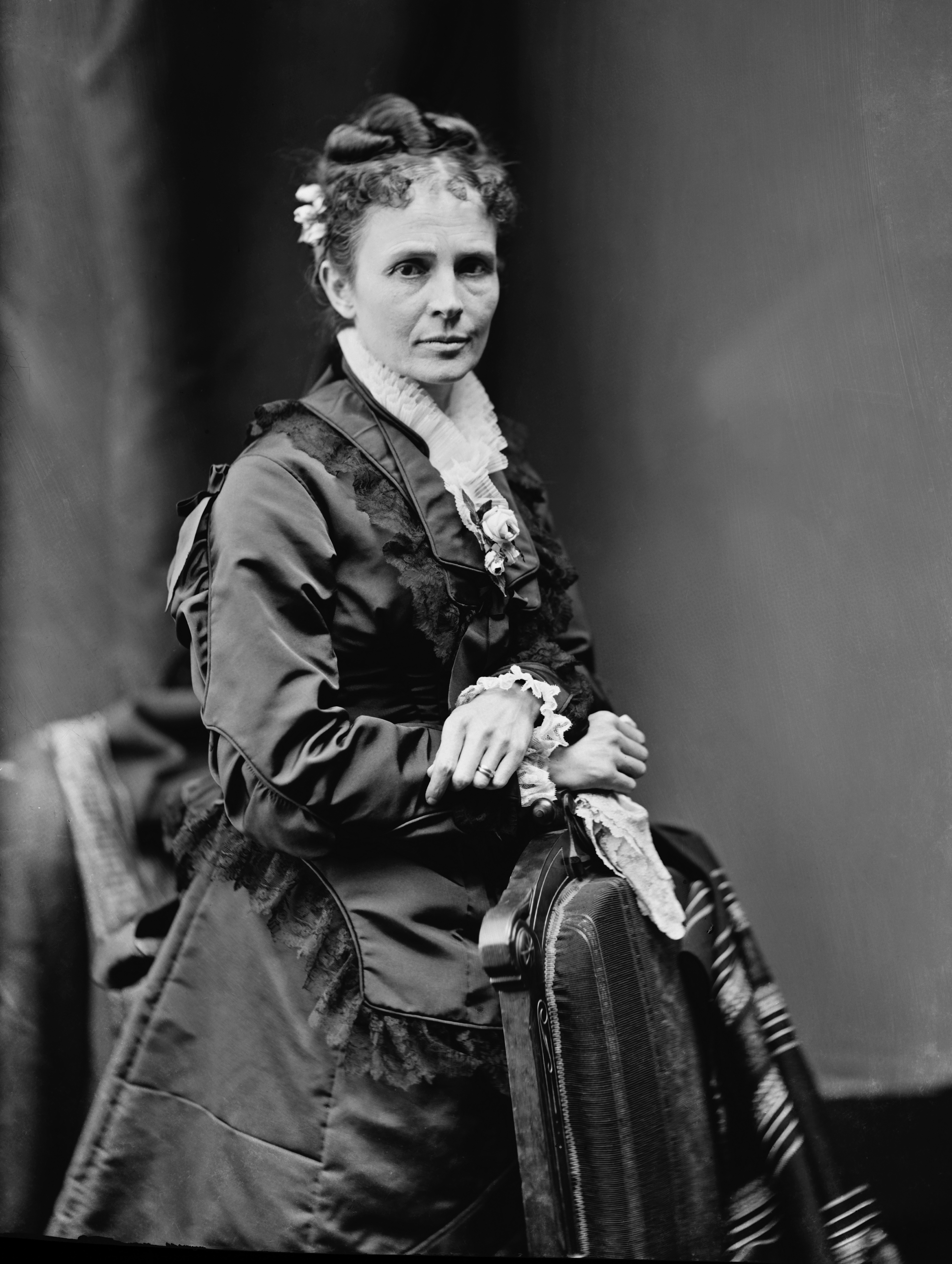
Lucretia Garfield

- March 4 – Samuel Colman, American painter, interior designer, and writer (d. 1920)
- March 7 – Carl Neumann, German mathematician (d. 1925)
- March 10 – John Owen Dominis, prince consort of the Kingdom of Hawaiʻi as the husband of Queen Liliʻuokalani (d. 1891)
- March 17 – Moncure D. Conway, American abolitionist minister and radical writer (d. 1907)
- March 19 – Ármin Vámbéry, Hungarian Turkologist and traveler (d. 1913)
- March 21 – Charles Altamont Doyle, illustrator, watercolourist and civil servant (d. 1893)
- March 27 – William Quiller Orchardson, Scottish portraitist (d. 1910)
- April 3 – James Sewall Reed, American soldier (d. 1864)
- April 4 – Fedor Flinzer, German author, educator and illustrator (d. 1911)
- April 5 – Jules Ferry, French premier (d. 1893)
- April 7 – Ferdinand Kittel, German missionary, Lutheran priest and indologist (d. 1903)
- April 8
  - Howell Edmunds Jackson, American politician, Associate Justice of the Supreme Court of the United States (d. 1895)
  - Alfred von Waldersee, German field marshal (d. 1904)
- April 14
  - Wilhelm Busch, German humorist, poet, illustrator and painter (d. 1908)
  - James H. Ledlie, civil engineer for American railroads and a general in the Union Army (d. 1882)
- April 15 – John Irwin, American admiral (d. 1901)
- April 17 – Robert Loyd-Lindsay, British soldier, politician, and philanthropist (d. 1901)
- April 19
  - José Echegaray, Spanish writer, Nobel Prize laureate (d. 1916)
  - Lucretia Garfield, First Lady of the United States (d. 1918)

=== May–June ===
- May 7 – Heinrich Julius Holtzmann, German Protestant theologian (d. 1910)
- May 14
  - Charles Peace, English criminal (d. 1879)
  - Rudolf Lipschitz, German mathematician (d. 1903)
- May 20 – Garretson W. Gibson, 14th president of Liberia (d. 1910)
- May 21
  - Hudson Taylor, English founder of the China Inland Mission (d. 1905)
  - Edwin Warren Moïse, Jewish-American lawyer, Confederate officer, and Adjutant-General from South Carolina (d. 1902)
- May 22 – Laura Gundersen, Norwegian actor (d. 1898)
- March 26 – Michel Bréal, French philologist (d. 1915)
- May 27 – Alexandr Aksakov, Russian writer (d. 1903)
- May 28 – Heinrich XIV, Prince Reuss Younger Line from 1867 to 1913 (d. 1913)
- June 9 – Martha Waldron Janes, American minister, suffragist, columnist (d. unknown)
- June 10 – Nicolaus Otto, German engineer (d. 1891)
- June 11 – Jules Vallès, French journalist, author, and left-wing political activist (d. 1885)
- June 12 – Pierre Théoma Boisrond-Canal, Haitian politician, 12th President of Haiti (d. 1905)
- June 17 – Sir William Crookes, English chemist, physicist (d. 1919)
- June 21
  - Louise Rayner, British watercolour artist (d. 1924)
  - Joseph Rainey, American politician, first black person in the House of Representatives (d. 1887)
- June 23 – Gustav Jäger, German naturalist and hygienist (d. 1917)
- June 29 – Rafqa Pietra Chobok, Lebanese Maronite nun who was canonized (d. 1914)

=== July–August ===
- July 1 – Karl Binz, German physician and pharmacologist (d. 1913)
- July 5 – Pavel Chistyakov, Russian painter and art teacher (d. 1919)
- July 6 – Emperor Maximilian I of Mexico (d. 1867)
- July 10 – Alvan Graham Clark, American astronomer and telescope-maker (d. 1897)
- July 11 – Charilaos Trikoupis, 7-time Prime Minister of Greece (d. 1896)
- July 19 – Julius von Verdy du Vernois, German general and staff officer (d. 1910)
- July 22 – Colin Archer, Norwegian naval architect and shipbuilder (d. 1921)
- July 26 – Joseph P. Fyffe, American admiral (d. 1896)
- July 29 – Luigi Palma di Cesnola, Italian-American soldier, diplomat and archaeologist (d. 1904)
- August 2 – Henry Steel Olcott, American officer (d. 1907)
- August 3 – Edward Wilmot Blyden, Americo-Liberian educator, writer, diplomat, and politician (d. 1912)
- August 7 – Max Lange, German chess player and problem composer (d. 1899)
- August 8 – George, King of Saxony (d. 1904)
- August 9 – Alexander von Monts, officer in the Prussian Navy and later the German Imperial Navy (d. 1889)
- August 13 – George F. Robinson, American soldier (d. 1907)
- August 16 – Wilhelm Wundt, German physiologist, philosopher, and professor, and pioneer of modern psychology (d. 1920)
- August 20 – Thaddeus S. C. Lowe, American aeronaut, scientist and inventor (d. 1913)
- August 26 – Charles DeRudio, Italian aristocrat and U.S. Army officer (d. 1910)

=== September–October ===
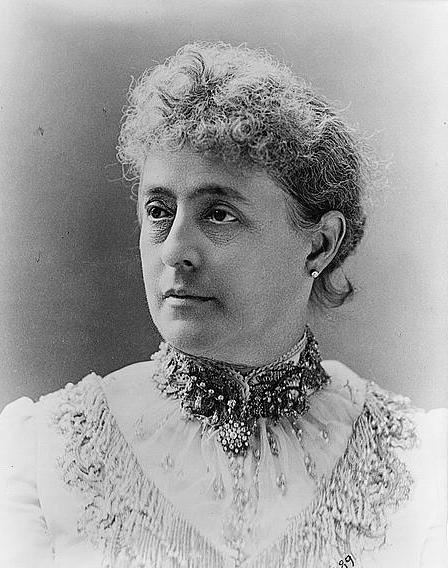
Caroline Harrison

- September 1 – Hermann Steudner, botanist and an explorer of Africa (d.1863)
- September 10 – Randall L. Gibson, American politician and general in the Confederate Army (d. 1892)
- September 14 – Henry Steers, son of James Rich Steers, nephew of George Steers, proprietor of Henry Steers' Ship Yard (d. 1903)
- September 20 – Prince Nikolaus Wilhelm of Nassau (d. 1905)
- September 21 – Louis Paul Cailletet, French physicist and inventor (d. 1913)
- September 22 – John Smith, nephew of Joseph Smith, the founder of The Church of Jesus Christ of Latter Day Saints and the fifth Presiding Patriarch of LDS Church (d. 1911)
- September 25 – William Le Baron Jenney, American architect and engineer(d. 1907)
- September 30 – Frederick Roberts, 1st Earl Roberts, British Victorian era general (d. 1914)
- October 1
  - Caroline Harrison, First Lady of the United States (d. 1892)
  - Henry Clay Work, American composer and songwriter (d. 1884)
- October 2
  - Sir Edward Tylor, English anthropologist (d. 1917)
  - Julius von Sachs, German botanist (d. 1897)
- October 3 – Richard Meade, Lord Gilford, British admiral (d. 1907)
- October 4 – Thorborg Rappe, Swedish social reformer (d. 1902)
- October 6
  - August Eisenlohr, German egyptologist (d. 1902)
  - Christian Mali, German painter and art professor (d. 1906)
- October 7 – William Thomas Blanford, English geologist and naturalist (d. 1905)
- October 10 – Joe Cain, American parade organizer for Mardi Gras in Mobile, Alabama (d. 1904)
- October 15 - Hugh Ryves Baker, Church of England priest and founder of St Michael's Woolwich (d. 1898)
- October 16 – George Crockett Strong, Union brigadier general in the American Civil War(d. 1863)
- October 21 – Gustav Langenscheidt, German publisher (died 1895)
- October 22 – Robert Eitner, German musicologist, researcher and bibliographer (died 1905)
- October 23
  - Grand Duke Michael Nikolaevich of Russia, fourth son and seventh child of Tsar Nicholas I of Russia and Charlotte of Prussia (d. 1909)
  - Johan Gabriel Ståhlberg, Finnish priest and father of K. J. Ståhlberg, the first President of Finland (d. 1873)
  - William Hulbert, American professional baseball executive who was one of the founders of the National League (d. 1882)
- October 25 – Grand Duke Michael Nikolaevich of Russia, Russian noble, child of Emperor Nicholas I and Charlotte of Prussia (d. 1909)
- October 29 – Narcisa de Jesús, Ecuadorian-born philanthropist, lay hermit, sainted (d. 1869)

=== November–December ===
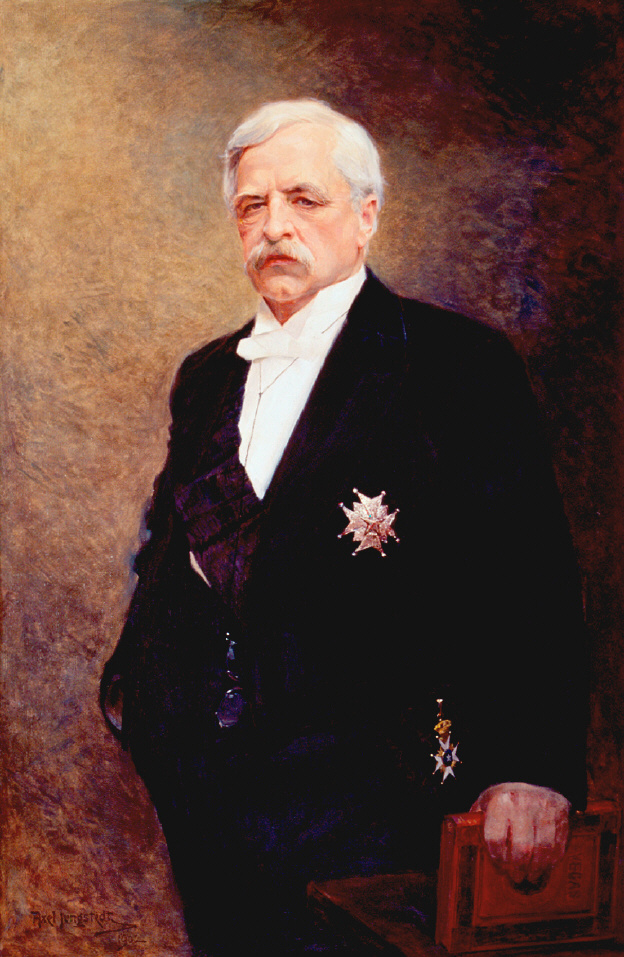
Adolf Erik Nordenskiöld

- November 1 – Gyula Szapáry, Hungarian politician, 10th Prime Minister of Hungary (d. 1905)
- November 3 – Hubert de Burgh-Canning, 2nd Marquess of Clanricarde (d. 1916)
- November 7 – Andrew Dickson White, American historian, diplomat and co-founder of Cornell University (d. 1918)
- November 9 – Émile Gaboriau, French writer, novelist, journalist, and a pioneer of detective fiction (d. 1873)
- November 10 – Samuel McKee, Colonel for the Union Army and served in the Third Kentucky Volunteer Infantry (d. 1862)
- November 12 – Nancy Edberg, Swedish pioneer of women's swimming (d. 1892)
- November 15 – Hermann Ottomar Herzog, German-American painter (d. 1932)
- November 18 – Adolf Erik Nordenskiöld, Finnish-Swedish geologist and explorer (d. 1901)
- November 26 – Mary Edwards Walker, American physician (d. 1919)
- November 28 – Sir Leslie Stephen, English writer, critic (d. 1904)
- November 29 – Louisa May Alcott, American author (d. 1888)
- December 6 – Thaddeus C. Pound, American businessman and politician (d. 1914)
- December 8
  - Bjørnstjerne Bjørnson, Norwegian author, Nobel Prize laureate (d. 1910)
  - G. A. Henty, English novelist and war correspondent (d. 1902)
- December 11 – Nancy Edberg, Swedish swimmer, swimming instructor and bath house manager (d. 1892)
- December 13 – Alexander Milton Ross, Canadian abolitionist (d. 1897)
- December 14 – Ana Betancourt, Cuban national heroine (d. 1901)
- December 15 – Gustave Eiffel, French engineer (d. 1923)
- December 21 – John H. Ketcham, American politician (d. 1906)
- December 27 – Thomas Blakiston, English explorer, zoologist, and naturalist. (d. 1891)

=== Unknown date ===
- Margaret Morton Bibb, American quilter (d. 1900/1910)
- Naimuddin, Bengali writer and Islamic scholar (d. 1907)
- Turki bin Said, former Sultan of Muscat and Oman (d. 1888)
- Nikiforos Lytras, Greek painter (d. 1904)
- James James, Welsh harpist and musician (d. 1902)
- Mary Fields, American mail carrier who was the first Black woman to be employed as a star route postwoman in the United States (d. 1914)
- Jonathan (tortoise), world's oldest living land animal.

== Deaths ==
=== January–June ===
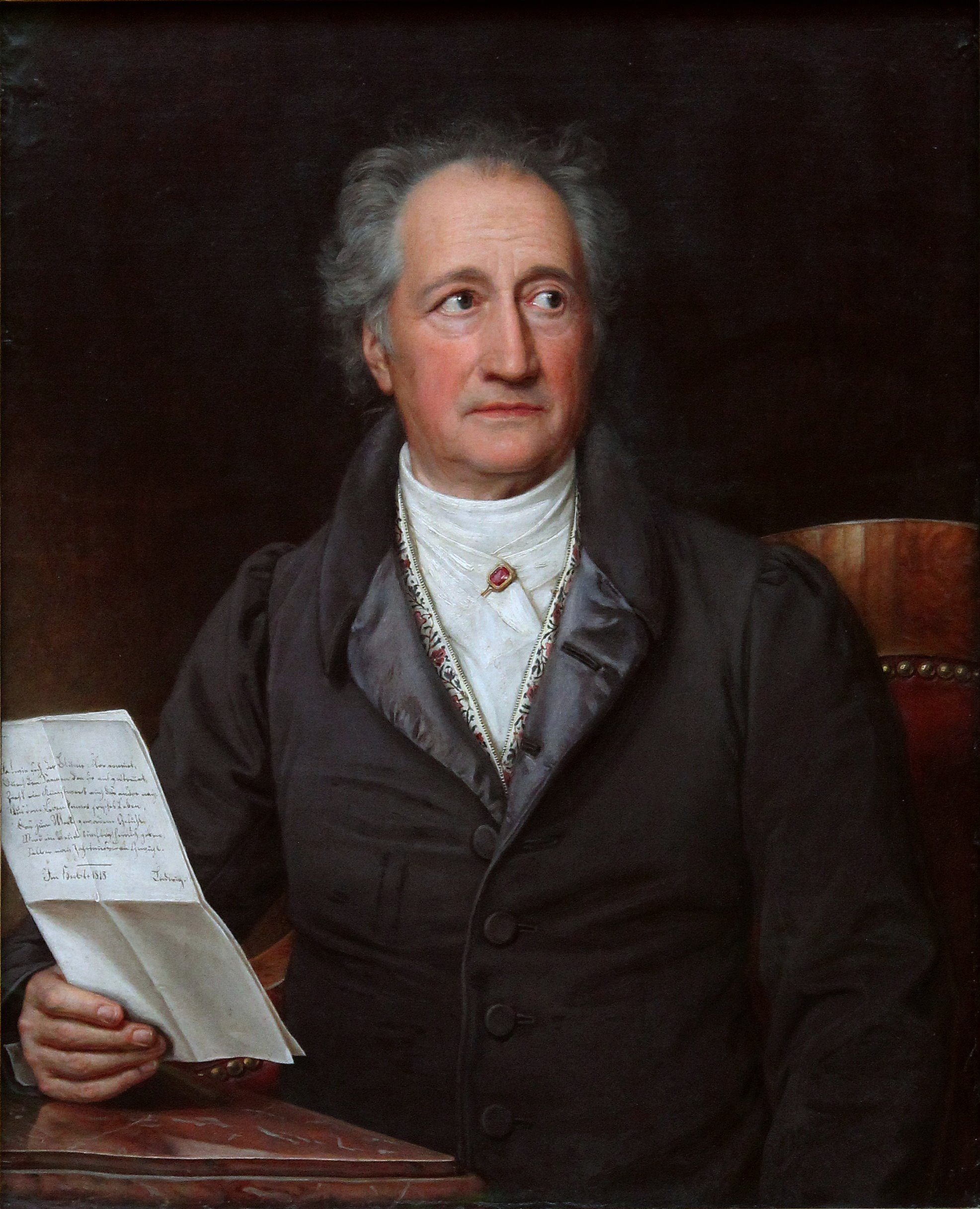
Johann Wolfgang von Goethe

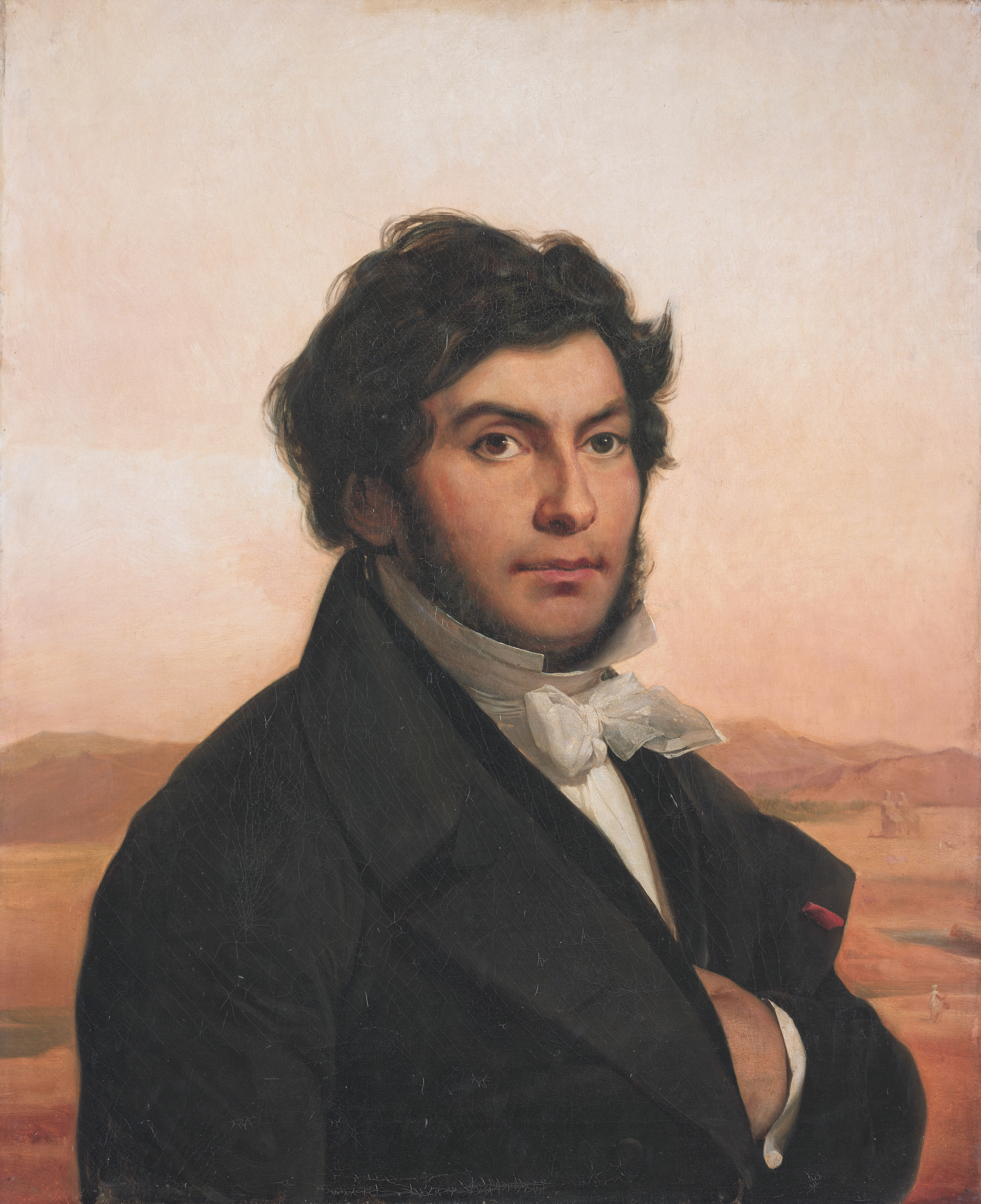
Jean-François Champollion

- January 24 – Daniel Sykes, English politician (b. 1766)
- January 26 – Alexander Cochrane, British admiral (b. 1758)
- January 27 – Andrew Bell, Scottish educationalist, founder of Madras College, India (b. 1753)
- February 2 – Ignacio López Rayón, leader of the Mexican War of Independence (b. 1773)
- February 3 – George Crabbe, English poet and naturalist (b. 1754)
- March 4 – Jean-François Champollion, French Egyptologist (b. 1790)
- March 10 – Muzio Clementi, Italian composer and pianist (b. 1752)
- March 15 – Otto Wilhelm Masing, Estonian linguist (b. 1763)
- March 22 – Johann Wolfgang von Goethe, German writer (b. 1749)
- March 29 – Maria Theresa of Austria-Este, Queen of Sardinia (b. 1773)
- April 3 – Jean Baptiste Gay, vicomte de Martignac, Prime Minister of France (b. 1778)
- April 12 – Shadrach Bond, American politician and the first governor of Illinois (b. 1773)
- April 18 – Jeanne-Elisabeth Chaudet, French painter (b. 1761)
- May 13 – Georges Cuvier, French zoologist (b. 1769)
- May 23 – William Grant, British lawyer, politician and judge (b. 1752)
- May 28 – Nicolas Bergasse, French lawyer (b. 1750)
- May 31 – Évariste Galois, French mathematician (b. 1811)
- June 1 – Jean Maximilien Lamarque, French general and politician (b. 1770)
- June 5 – Kaʻahumanu, queen consort of Hawaii (b. 1768)
- June 6 – Jeremy Bentham, English philosopher (b. 1748)
- June 10 – Joseph Hiester, American politician (b. 1752)
- June 21 – Princess Amalie of Hesse-Darmstadt (b. 1754)
- June 23 – James Hall, Scottish geologist (b. 1761)

=== July–December ===
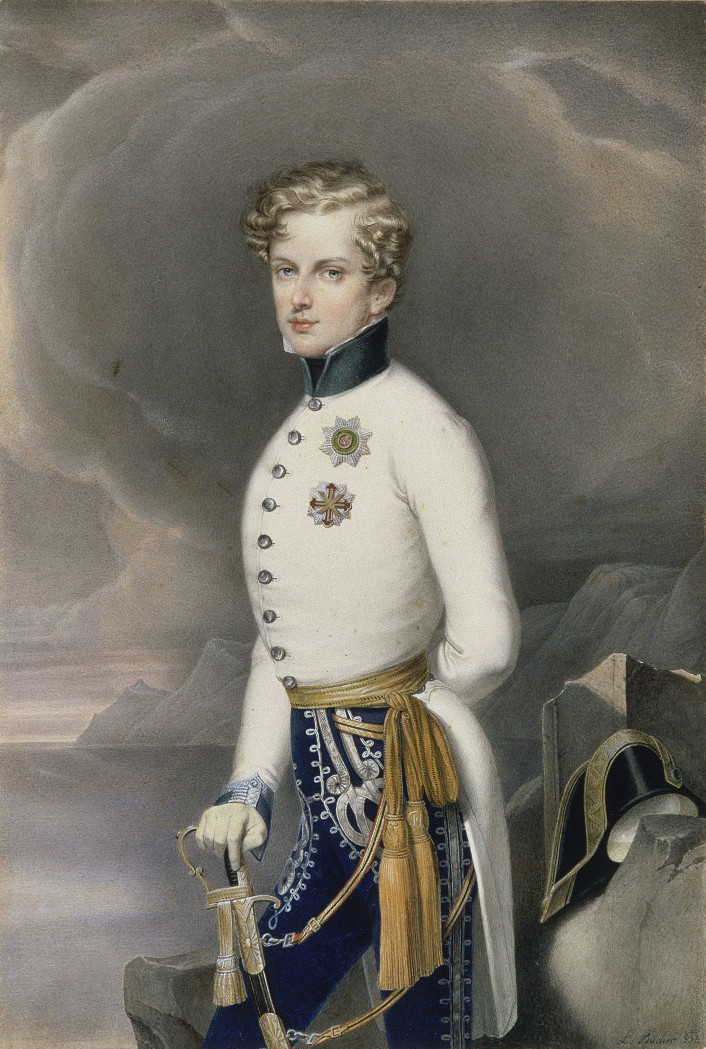
Napoleon II

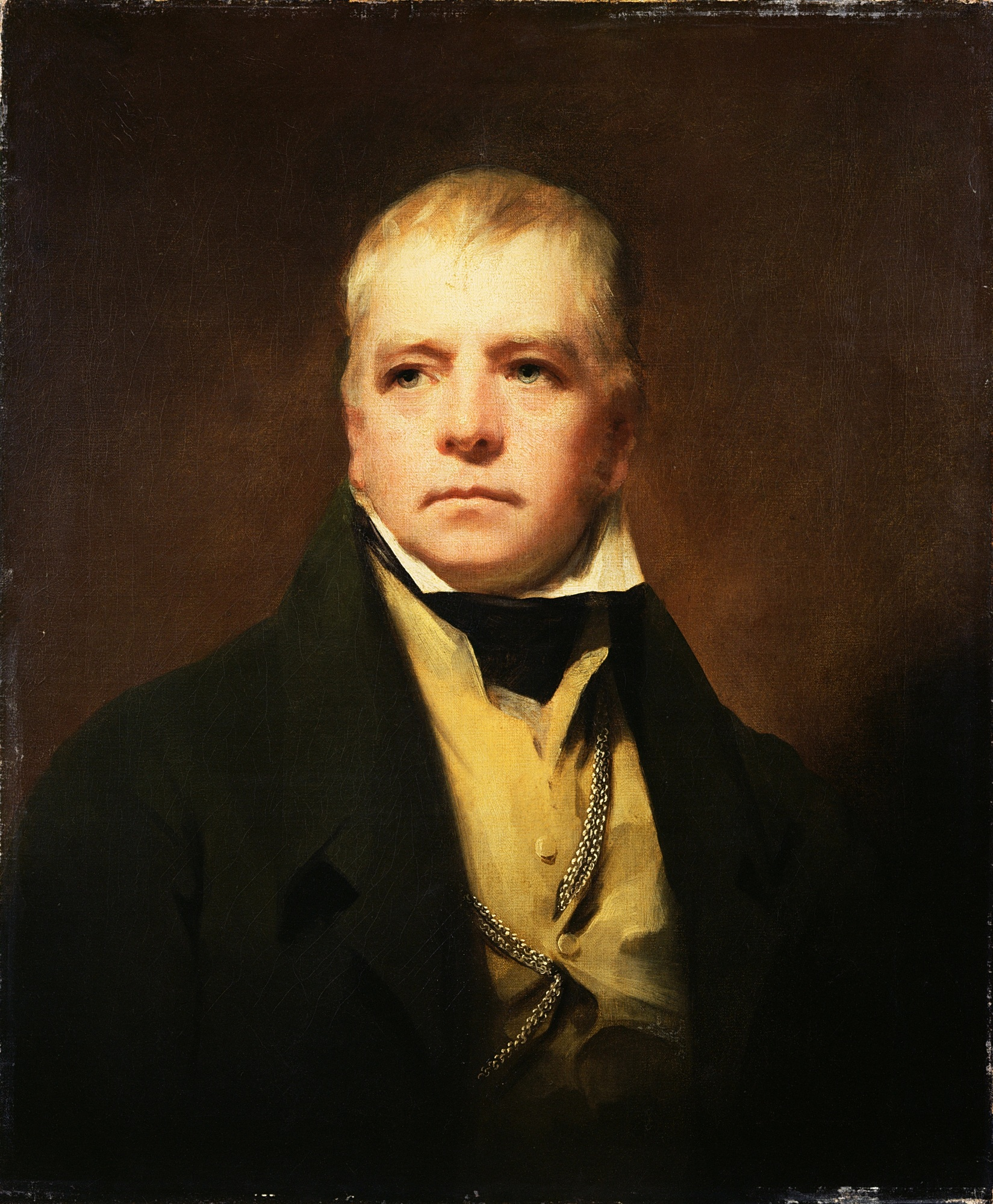
Walter Scott

- July 22 – Napoleon II of France (b. 1811)
- July 31 – Edward Abbott, Australian soldier, politician and judge (b. 1766)
- August 24 – Nicolas Léonard Sadi Carnot, French military engineer and physicist (b. 1796)
- September 1 – Joseph Kinghorn, Particular Baptist Minister (b. 1766)
- September 2 – Franz Xaver von Zach, Austrian scientific editor and astronomer (b. 1754)
- September 21 – Sir Walter Scott, Scottish poet and novelist (b. 1771)
- September 27 – Karl Christian Friedrich Krause, German philosopher (b. 1781)
- October 11 – Thomas Hardy, British political reformer (b. 1752)
- October 31 – Antonio Scarpa, Italian anatomist (b. 1752)
- November 8 – Marie-Jeanne de Lalande, French astronomer and mathematician (b. 1768)
- November 12
  - Henry Eckford, Scottish-born American shipbuilder, naval architect, industrial engineer, and entrepreneur (b. 1775)
  - Barnaba Oriani, Italian priest (b. 1752)
- November 14 – Charles Carroll of Carrollton, signer of the United States Declaration of Independence and U.S. Senator (b. 1737)
- November 15 – Jean-Baptiste Say, French economist, originator of Say's law (b. 1767)
- December 18 – Philip Freneau, American poet and journalist (b. 1752)
- December 29 – James Hillhouse, American politician and congressman from Connecticut, 1791 until 1810 (b. 1754)
- undated – Birgithe Kühle, Norwegian journalist (b. 1762)
