= Mabel Knowles =

British popular writer, church worker (1875–1949)

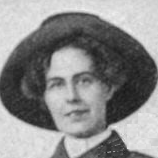
- Born: 1 January 1875; Streatham, England
- Died: 29 November 1949 (aged 74); London, England
- Occupations: writer and mission worker
- Writing career
- Genres: romance, children's and sci-fi

Mabel Winifred Knowles who wrote as May Wynne and Lester Lurgan (1 January 1875 – 29 November 1949) was a British popular writer and church worker. She wrote 100s of historic romances and books for children. She wrote a few sci-fi books including the book of the first British Sci Fi film. She gave 25 years to leading a mission in London.

== Life ==
Knowles was born in Streatham in 1875. Her parents were Emma Letitia (born Paxton) and William Knowles. Her father was a merchant banker and she was home educated. Her first book was titles Life's Object and it gave advice to girl's including that they should not give their attention to athletics or, ironically, "foolish mawkish love stories".

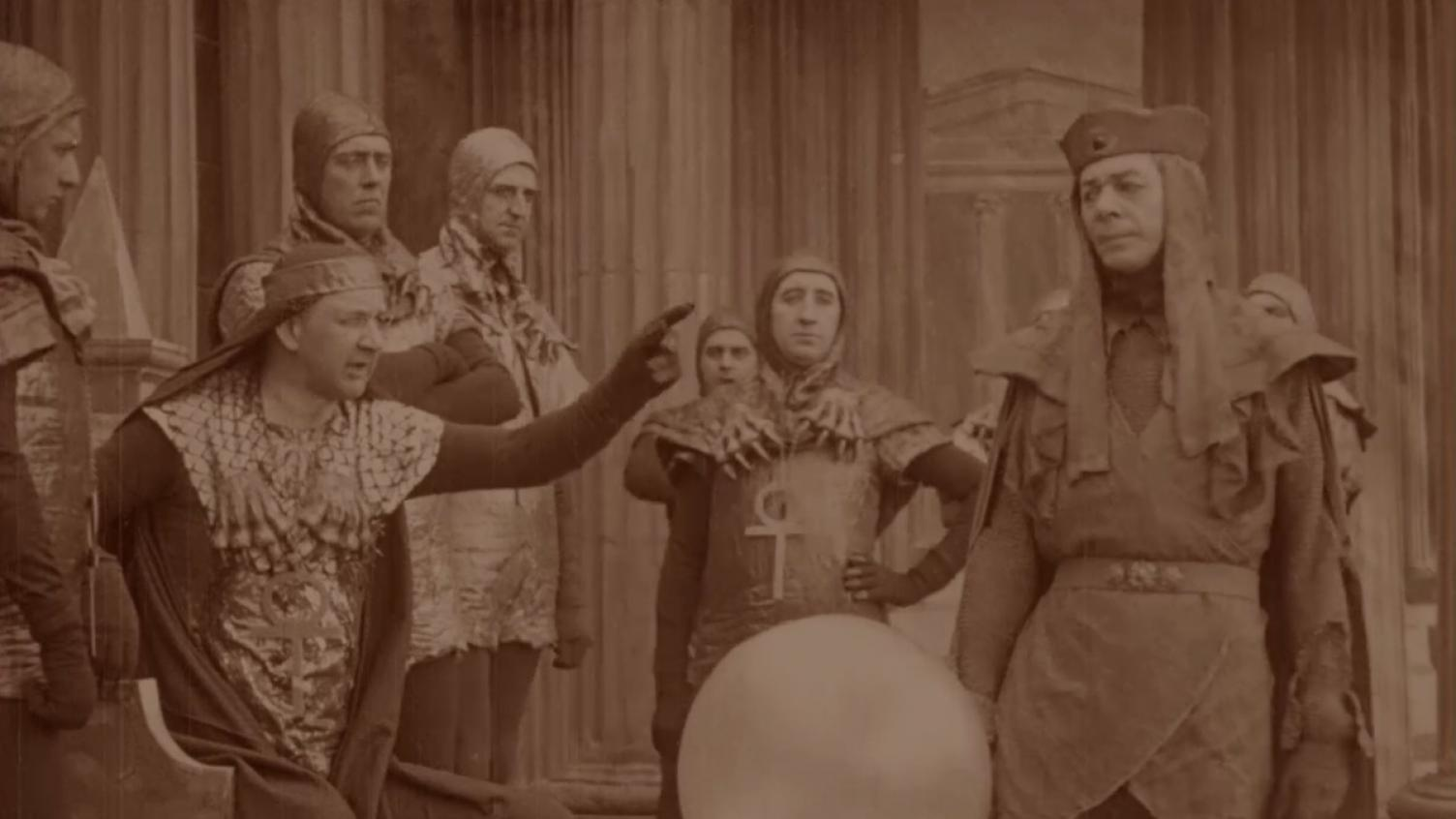
A scene from the 1913 film A Message From Mars

Knowles adopted the nom de plume of Lester Lurgan and under that name she created detective and science fiction stories including "A Message from Mars" in 1912. This book was also creditted to Richard Ganthony as it was based on his successful play of the same name that had been popular in 1899. "A Message from Mars" was made into a film in 1913. The film was Britain's first Sci-Fi film, it starred Charles Hawtrey and its plot was very similar to Charles Dickens' A Christmas Carol.

The choice of Lester Lurgan as a name gave way to May Wynne who is credited with writing hundreds of books.

Knowles wrote stories for Cassell's Family Magazine, The Lady's Realm and The Pall Mall Magazine while writing a large number of historical romances and books for children.

From about 1924 she led the St Luke's Mission Church while still continuing to write. The Church of the Ascension in London's Victoria Docks had opened a mission house for women workers in 1909. Knowles wrote more than 300 books during her life. She continued leading the mission for 25 years, dying while preparing a mission service for women on 29 November 1949.

== Selected works ==
- The Great Adventure (Ward, Lock & Co., 1948)
- Malys Rockell
- Thirteen For Luck
