= A Message from Mars (1903 film) =

- Directed by: W.F. Brown; Franklyn Barrett
- Based on: A Message from Mars by Richard Ganthony
- Produced by: Franklyn Barrett
- Starring: Peter Savieri; Gus Neville
- Cinematography: Franklyn Barrett
- Release date: 1903
- Running time: 500 feet
- Country: New Zealand
- Languages: Silent film English intertitles

A Message from Mars is a 1903 New Zealand short film by Franklyn Barrett, based on the play of the same name by Richard Ganthony that had been highly popular in Australia and New Zealand.

Another adaptation of the play was made in 1913 in the UK. In December 2014, the British Film Institute announced this latter film was posted online on their website.

According to The Bulletin, "Only six people were employed in its making, but it was notable as the first picture in which trick photography was resorted to for dramatic effect. It was quite devoid of such modern improvements as "fade-ins", "fade-outs" and "close-ups", but it made money. "

== Plot ==
A Martian comes to Earth to show a human he is selfish.

== Cast ==
- Peter Savieri
- Mrs Savieri
- Gus Neville
- Miss Foley

== Preservation status ==
This 1903 film was New Zealand's first fiction film and is now considered a lost film.
