= St Barnabas' Church, West Silvertown =

Former church in Silvertown, London

Coordinates: 51.503526°N 0.024176°E

St Barnabas' Church, West Silvertown was a Church of England church in Silvertown, east London. It was opened in 1882 on Eastwood Road as a mission church of St Mark's Church, Silvertown. In the 1917 Silvertown explosion its chancel and iron hall were destroyed, leaving the church to use temporary buildings until the completion of a new church and the formation of a separate parish for it, both in 1926. The new parish was mainly drawn from St Mark's, though it also took a small part of the parish of St Luke's Church, Canning Town. The vicar of St John's Church, North Woolwich administered it after 1945. The parishes of St John, St Mark and St Barnabas were merged in 1974 to form the parish of North Woolwich with Silvertown.
