= George Procter Hawtrey =

George Procter Hawtrey (1847–17 August 1910) was a British actor, playwright and pageantmaster, and former schoolmaster.

== Early life and education ==
Hawtrey was son of Reverend John William Hawtrey, headmaster of the Alden House School at Slough. Hawtrey's two brothers, William and Charles, were also actors. He was educated at Eton College and Pembroke College, Oxford. A cousin was the economist Alfred Marshall.

== Academia ==
Having been assistant master at the school founded by his father, Hawtrey decided to leave teaching and follow his brother, Charles, onto the stage.

== Stage career ==
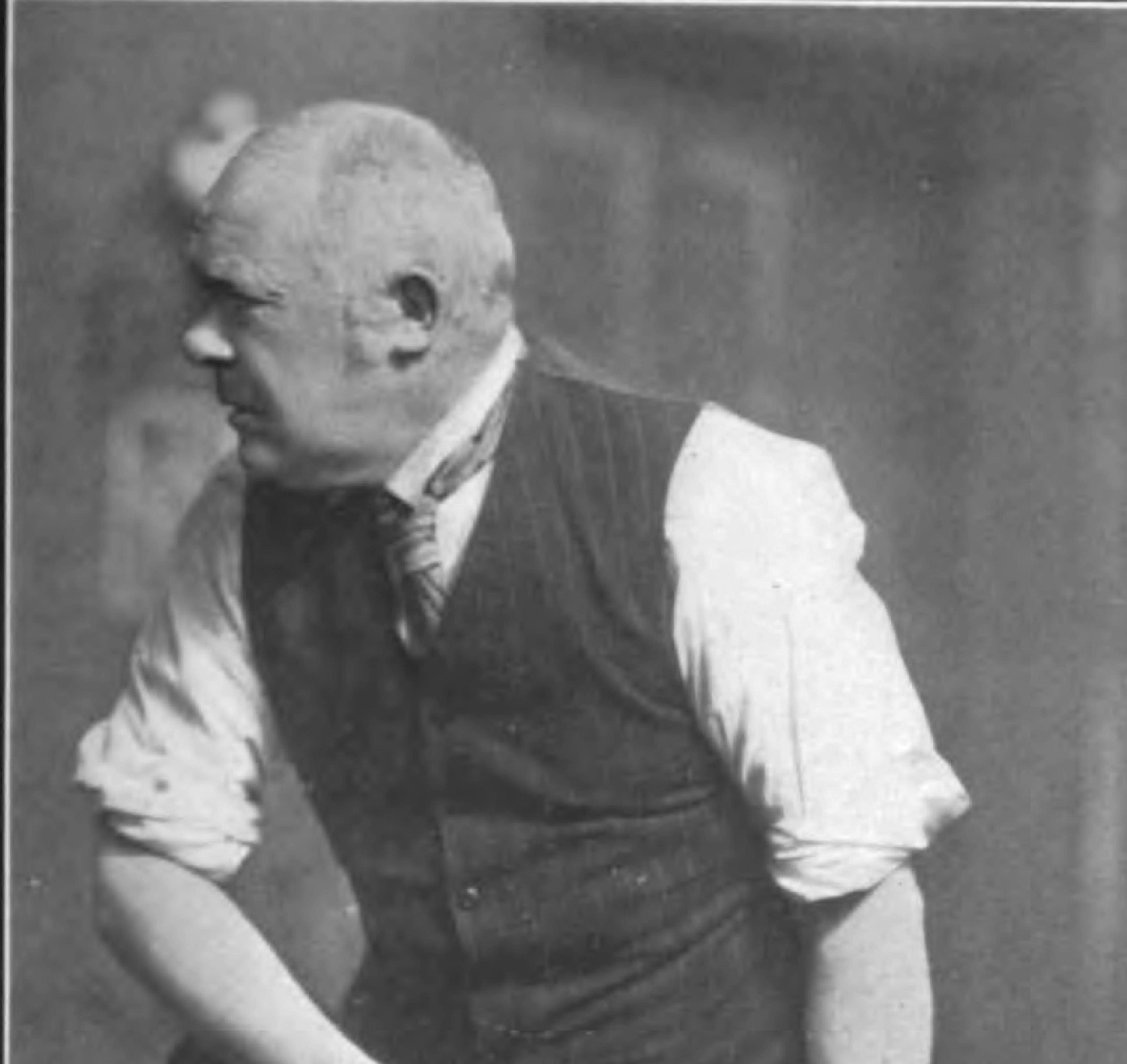
George's brother William on stage

Hawtrey did not make a notable success as an actor, raising his family in "straitened circumstances" which inspired his son, Ralph, to follow the more remunerative path of the civil service. Hawtrey's most notable achievement in connection with the stage was his adaptation of Baron von Moser's farce Mit Vergnügen (The Pickpocket), in which his brother Charles acted. He also assisted in preparing A Message from Mars for the stage. In 1908, Hawtrey became master of the Gloucestershire Historical Pageant at Cheltenham, followed by the National Pageant of Wales at Cardiff in October 1909 and the Chester Pageant in July 1910.

== Personal life ==
Hawtrey married firstly, in 1873, Eda (died 1892), daughter of William Strahan; he married secondly, Gertrude Jessie Rolls, daughter of Captain John Simon Chandos Harcourt, of Ankerwycke, Buckinghamshire. He fathered one son- the economist Ralph George Hawtrey- and two daughters. According to an obituary published in The Times, Hawtrey died of heart failure on 17 August 1910 at his London residence, Clarence Gate Mansions, at Marylebone (today Clarence Gate Gardens) following a severe bout with asthma while putting on the Chester Pageant in July of that year. He was 63 years old.
