= St Matthew's Church, Custom House =

Former church in West Ham, London

Coordinates: 51°30′38.32″N 0°1′38.72″E

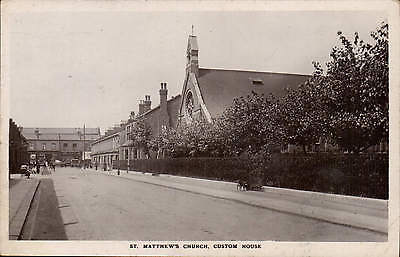
St Matthew's Church, Custom House.

St Matthew's Church, Custom House, was a Church of England church on Ethel Road in the Victoria Docks area of West Ham. It is named after its district, Custom House.

It was built in 1860 as a mission church of St Mark's Church, Silvertown and paid for by Charles Morrison, chairman of the Dock company. It later became a mission church of St Luke's, before being turned into a parish of its own in 1920. After 1945 it was served by clergy from the Church of the Ascension until 1960, when St Matthew's was closed - its parish was merged into that of Ascension the following year. It had been demolished for redevelopment by 1966.
