= Church of the Ascension, Victoria Docks =

Church in London, England

Coordinates: 51°30′40.463″N 0°2′14.449″E

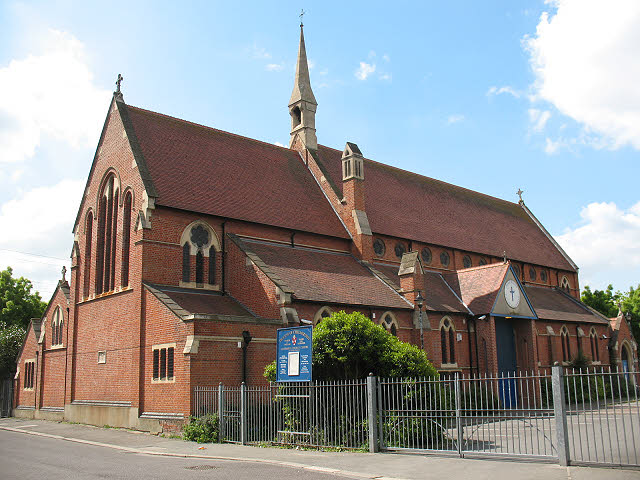
Church of the Ascension

The Church of the Ascension, West Ham, or Church of the Ascension, Victoria Docks, is a Church of England church on Baxter Road in West Ham, east London. It was first built in 1887 as a mission hall for St Luke's Church, later put under the charge of the Felsted School Mission, which prior to that had been working in Bromley. Between 1903 and 1907 a new church was built, with a separate parish split from St Luke's in 1905. The new parish opened a mission house for women workers in 1909.

From about 1924 writer Mabel Knowles led the St Luke's Mission Church in London's Victoria Docks. Knowles wrote more than 300 books during her life. She continued for leading the mission for 25 years, dying while preparing a mission service for women on 29 November 1949.

During the Second World War clergy from the Church of the Ascension also served Sandon parish near Chelmsford, since its rector Eric Leicester Andrews had been captured by the Japanese during the fall of Singapore in 1942. In 1961 the Church of the Ascension took on the area covered by the parish of St Matthew's Church, Custom House, which had been closed and deconsecrated the previous year.
