= Maud Milton =

English actress (1859–1945)

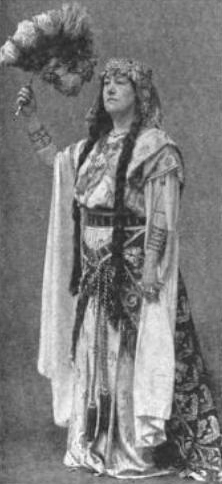
- As Miriam in Ben-Hur, 1902
- Born: 24 March 1859; Gravesend, Kent, England
- Died: 19 November 1945 (aged 86); Ryde, Isle of Wight, England
- Other names: Maude Milton; Maud Butler
- Occupation: Actress
- Years active: 1876 to 1923
- Spouse: ?Mr. Butler

Kate Maud Milton (1859–1945) was an English stage and screen actress.

== Biography ==
Maud Milton was born in Gravesend, Kent the daughter of a Merchant Marine sea captain and educated at home. She was apprenticed to be a dancing-mistress however she made a career turn and was coached for the stage by actor John Ryder. She made her debut appearance on stage at a theatre called The Royal Aquarium on 15 April 1876. She acted in many of the contemporary plays of the Victorian era as well as Shakespearean classics. She debuted and toured the U.S. in 1882–1883 though she work with Edwin Booth in 1880 while he was presenting Shakespeare in England. Other actors of note that she worked with were Wilson Barrett, Helena Modjeska, Frank Benson, John Martin-Harvey, Oscar Asche and H. B. Irving. In later years she would appear with Marie Tempest and Herbert Beerbohm Tree.

A seasoned stage veteran, she first appeared in a motion picture in 1913, a short film customary to the times. For eight years she appeared in a few shorts while still remaining in the theatre. Her final film was A Message from Mars (1921).

She died at Ryde on the Isle of Wight on 19 November 1945.

== Filmography ==
- The Old Wood Carver (1913)
- Damaged Goods (1914)
- Kill or Cure (1914)*short
- The Old Flute Player (1914)*short
- Janet of the Chorus (1915)*short
- The Criminal (1915)*short
- The Ruling Power (1915)*short
- A Message from Mars (1921)
