= St John's Church, North Woolwich =

- St John with St Mary and St Edward, North Woolwich
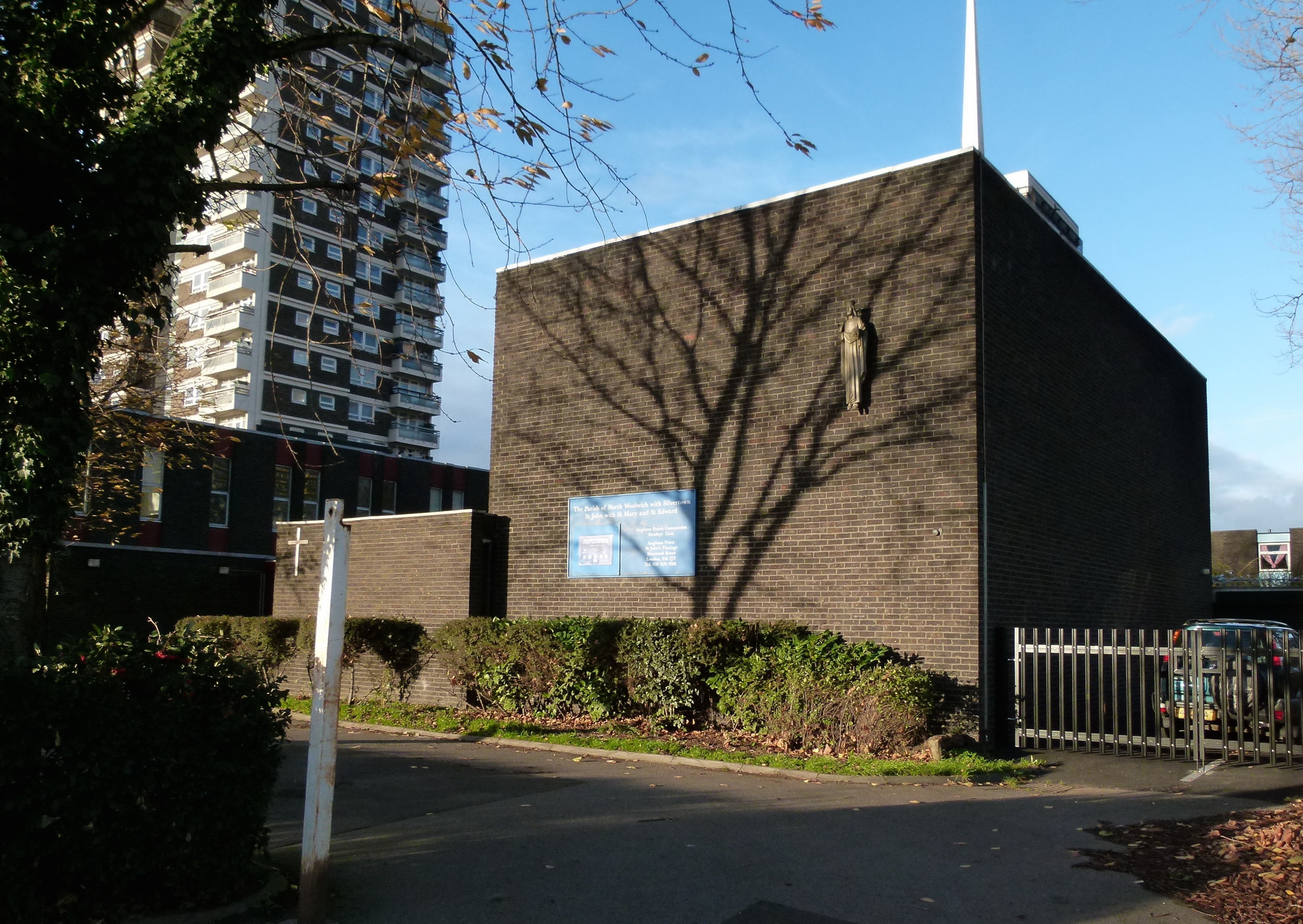
- St John's Church, North Woolwich
- 51°30′2.5272″N 0°3′31.2732″E
- Country: England
- Denomination: Church of England

History
- Status: Active
- Consecrated: 26 September 1872 (original); 28 October 1968 (current)

Architecture
- Years built: 1872

St John's Church, North Woolwich is a Church of England church in North Woolwich, east London. It also hosts a Roman Catholic congregation and so is sometimes known as St John with St Mary and St Edward, North Woolwich to include the dedications of this congregation's former churches.

== History ==
Its first building was consecrated by Thomas Legh Claughton, Bishop of Rochester on 26 September 1872, initially as a mission church of St Mark's Church, Silvertown and Uppingham School and from 1877 as a parish church in its own right. It parish was formed from an area that originally been part of the main East Ham parish before being assigned to St Mark's between 1864 and 1877.

The church building was destroyed on 7 September 1940, the first day of the London Blitz, leaving only the old Infants School Hall. The church used the school hall for worship until the consecration of a replacement on 28 October 1968 by John Tiarks, Bishop of Chelmsford - it had been built to a design by Laurence King and Partners. In 1974 St Mark's and St Barnabas' Church, West Silvertown (another former mission church of St Mark's) were declared redundant and their parishes merged with that of St John's (St Barnabas' had been administered by the vicar of St John's since 1945) - this formed the still-existent parish of North Woolwich with Silvertown, which is more or less co-terminous with the Royal Docks ward of Newham.
