= St Mark's Church, Silvertown =

Former church in east London, now a music venue

- St Mark's Church, Victoria Docks
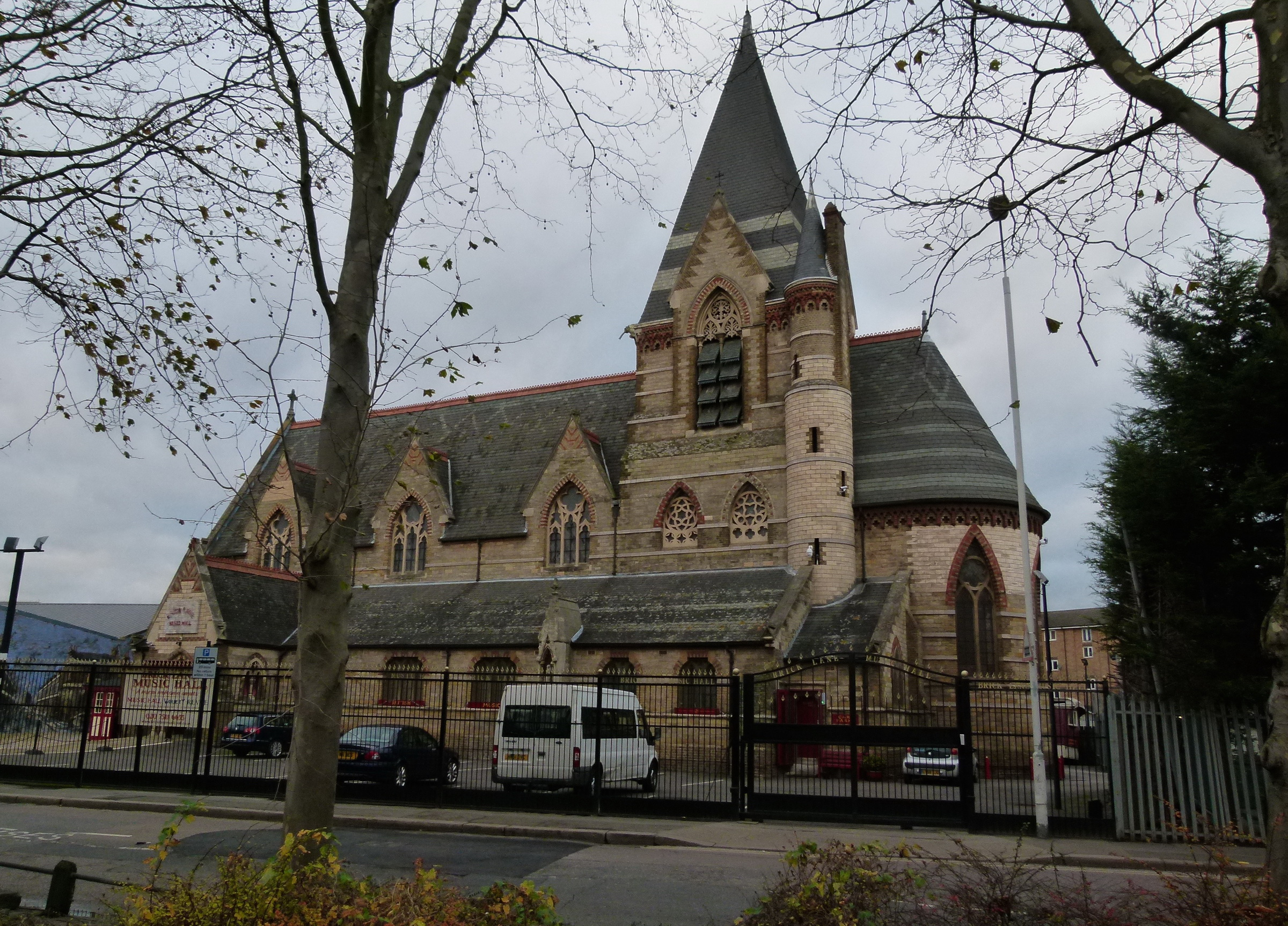
- St Mark's Church, Silvertown
- 51°30′9.7884″N 0°2′34.4184″E
- Country: England
- Denomination: Church of England

History
- Status: Deconsecrated
- Founded: 1857
- Dedication: 1862

Architecture
- Years built: 1862
- Closed: 1974

St Mark's Church, Silvertown or St Mark's Church, Victoria Docks is a former church building in Silvertown in east London, located on North Woolwich Road. It takes one of its names from the nearby Royal Docks. It was listed as Grade II* in 1971 and now houses the Brick Lane Music Hall.

== History ==
=== Construction ===
The church was founded as a joint church and school, housed in an iron building and opened in 1857. Samuel Sanders Teulon was taken on as the designer of a permanent church, which opened in 1862 and was promoted to a separate parish two years later, taking parts of Woolwich (centred on St Mary Magdalene Woolwich on the opposite bank of the Thames) and East Ham. The docks' manager Charles Capper was allowed to nominate the first vicar, but after that the bishop of London (or after 1884 the Corporation of the City of London) was made the parish's patron. One of its assistant priests in that era was Hugh Ryves Baker, who went on to found St Michael's Woolwich.

St Mark's also founded mission churches at St Matthew's, Custom House in 1860, which was later transferred to St Luke's Church, Canning Town before becoming a parish of its own in 1920. St Luke's itself was originally a mission church of St Mark's before being made a parish of its own on its permanent church's completion in 1875. St Mark's also opened the mission churches of St John's, North Woolwich in 1872 (which took the East Ham part of St Mark's parish in 1877 to become a parish church of its own) and St Barnabas' Church, West Silvertown in 1882 (which became a parish of its own in 1926).

=== Redundancy ===
The building survived the war but the decline of the London docks in the 1960s led to a sharp drop in local population and major slum clearances in the area. The church was declared redundant in 1974 and its parish merged with those of two of its former mission churches, St Barnabas' and St John's – St Barnabas was also declared redundant, with St John's becoming the sole church for the resulting parish of North Woolwich with Silvertown. The church building was bought in 1979 by Newham Council, with the intention of turning it into a museum. A major fire in 1981 largely destroyed the roof, which was replaced between 1984 and 1989.

=== Brick Lane Music Hall ===
After the fire the Brick Lane Music Hall took on the building, converting it to its present use in 2003 to host traditional music hall and variety shows. Brick Lane Music Hall had opened in 1992 in the former Truman's Brewery building in Brick Lane, before moving to Shoreditch and then its present building. It was established by Vincent Hayes, who had previously run and performed in Music Hall shows at the Lord Hood pub, where he was landlord during the 1980s.

The church's exterior was left largely unchanged, whilst a stage, bar, kitchen and lighting and sound equipment were added to the interior, with offices housed in the church's former vestry. In 2004 a mural was painted on the wall behind the church's exterior war memorial, whilst a new lighting and sound rig was installed in October 2006. Audiences are seated at tables in a cabaret-style arrangement and food is served during the interval at matinees and before the show in the evenings. Brick Lane Music Hall is licensed for weddings and civil partnership ceremonies as well as being involved in workshops for schools, as well as taking shows to community centres, care homes and hospices throughout the East End.
