= Charles Hawtrey (actor, born 1858) =

British actor and producer

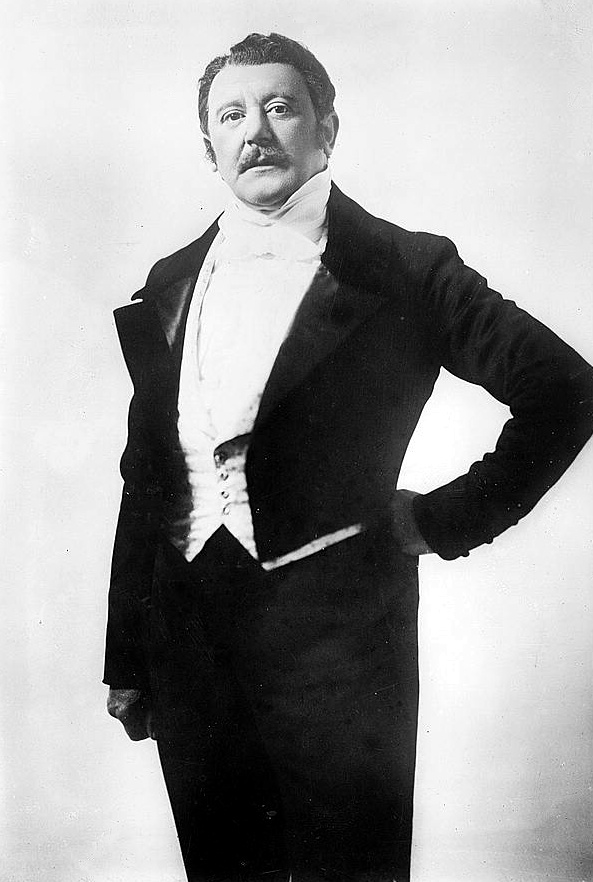
Charles Hawtrey in Money (1911)

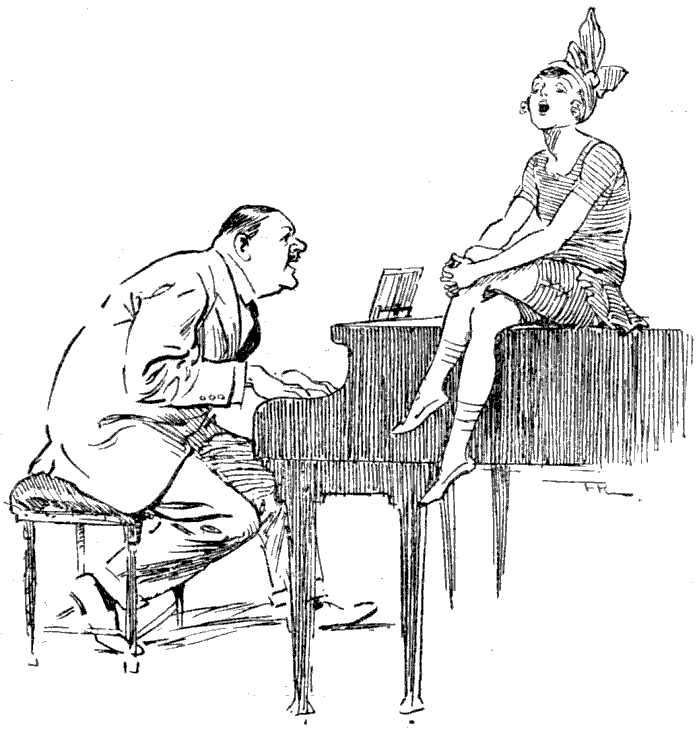
Cartoon in Punch, 25 August 1920, showing Hawtrey accompanying Joan Barry

Sir Charles Henry Hawtrey (21 September 1858 – 30 July 1923) was an English actor, director, producer and manager. He pursued a successful career as an actor-manager, specialising in debonair, often disreputable, parts in popular comedies. He occasionally played in Sheridan and other classics, but was generally associated with new works by writers including Oscar Wilde and Somerset Maugham.

Born to a long-established county family, Hawtrey was one of three of his parents' five sons to pursue a theatrical career. Before going on the stage he had considered joining the army, but failed to apply himself to the necessary studies to qualify for a commission. Once established as an actor he quickly took on the additional role of a manager, boosted by an early success with his own adaptation of a German farce presented in London as The Private Secretary, which made his fortune. A lifelong gambler, both with theatrical productions and on horseracing, to which he was addicted, he was bankrupted several times during his career.

Regarded as Britain's leading comedy actor of his generation, Hawtrey was mentor and role model to younger actors including Noël Coward. Towards the end of his career Hawtrey starred in a handful of silent movies. One example is the 1913 film A Message from Mars.

== Early life ==
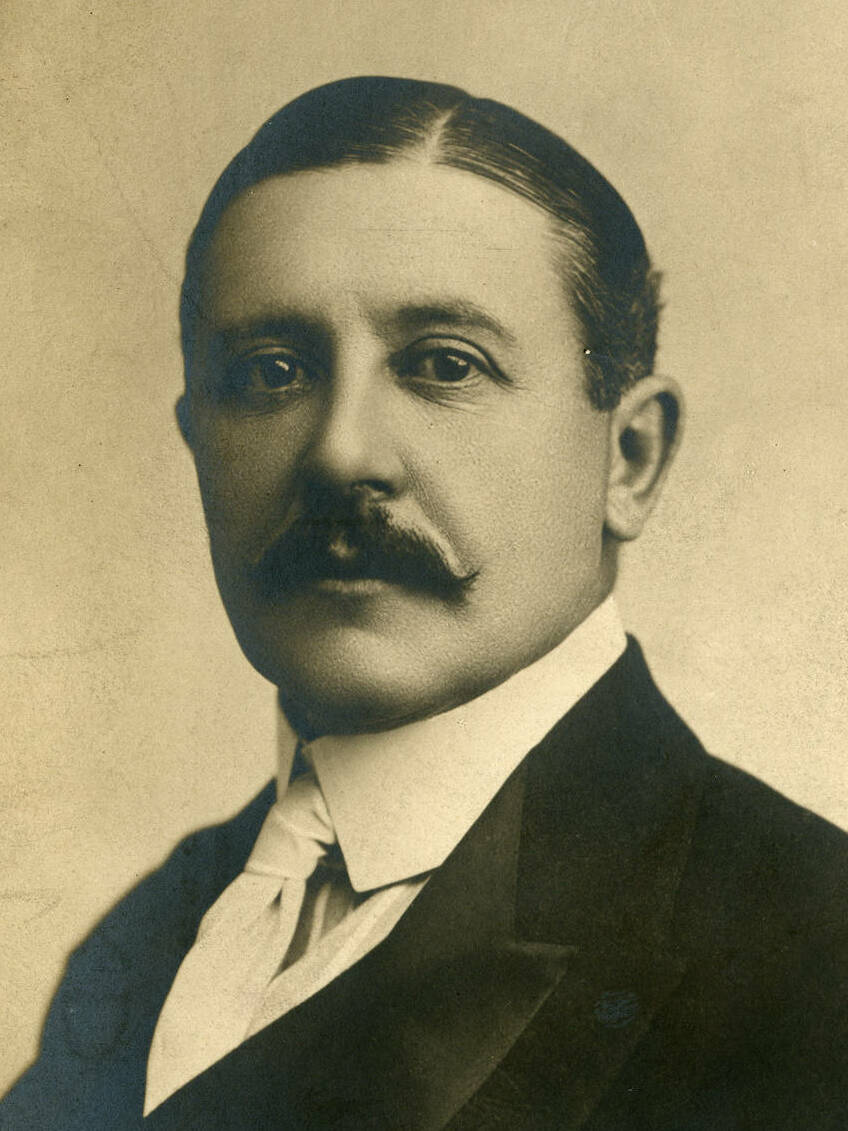
Charles Hawtrey, 1907

Hawtrey was born at Slough and educated at Eton College, the fifth son and eighth of the ten children of the Rev. John William Hawtrey and his first wife, Frances Mary Anne, née Procter. The Hawtrey family had a long association with Eton; at the time of Hawtrey's birth his father was a housemaster there, and a cousin, Edward Craven Hawtrey, was Provost. At the age of eight Hawtrey entered the lower school of the college. Three years later John Hawtrey left Eton to found St Michael's School, Slough; Hawtrey was educated there from 1869 to 1872, when he returned to Eton for a year, before moving to Rugby. As a schoolboy he became known as "a sportsman of dash and endurance". At the age of fourteen he became a keen follower of horse-racing, a lifelong obsession that continually disrupted his finances. He commented that his first encounter with racing was "a fatal day for me. I had one bet and lost half-a-crown, and I have been trying for fifty years to win it back."

From Rugby, Hawtrey went briefly to a crammer in London, to study for a career in the army, but soon abandoned the idea. He worked as a private tutor from 1876 to 1879 and then he began his theatrical career. It started badly: he broke his collar-bone while playing football and had to withdraw from the cast before the opening night. In February 1881 he matriculated at Pembroke College, Oxford, but withdrew in October, having been cast in the supporting role of Edward Langton in F. C. Burnand's The Colonel at the Prince of Wales's Theatre, London. Uncertain of success, he temporarily adopted the stage name Charles Bankes. He was well received in the play, and was given valuable lessons in stagecraft from the producer:

He taught me a great many elementary rules which were most helpful – such as the actions of my hands and arms, walking on the stage, holding myself as easily as I could, and above all things he would never let me put my hands in my pockets. Of course my hands always felt like two great hams and I never knew what to do with them, but I found that eventually I forgot all about them and then they behaved naturally!

== Actor-manager ==
In early 1882 Hawtrey played Jack Merryweather in The Marble Arch, which starred Herbert Beerbohm Tree. Later in that year he toured in The Colonel in a cast headed by Charles Collette. Two of Hawtrey's brothers, William and George (father of the economist Ralph Hawtrey), had also become actors, and in early 1883, Charles and William led a small touring company to towns in south-east England.

Hawtrey in what the Illustrated London News called "essentially a Charles Hawtrey part", in Inconstant George (1910)

In 1884 Hawtrey had a huge success in London presenting his own adaptation of a German farce by Gustav von Moser, Der Bibliothekar, rewritten as The Private Secretary with the action moved to an English setting. It opened in March to disparaging reviews and at first played to small audiences, but Hawtrey persisted and further rewrote the play. It moved from the Prince's to the Globe Theatre, the principal roles were recast (with Hawtrey playing the crusty old Cattermole), and in the words of The Manchester Guardian "the audiences steadily laughed it into a success." The production ran for 785 performances, and Hawtrey made £123,000 from it – an enormous sum for those days. (Note: Hawtrey liked to claim that he introduced the queueing system to the West End, to control the crowds who came to see the play, but Richard D'Oyly Carte had anticipated him by three years, instituting queueing at the Savoy Theatre in 1881.) The play was revived in London eight times during his life.

Hawtrey pursued a career as an actor-manager, making a speciality of suave, sometimes immoral, but likable characters. His managerial career was chequered: great successes were often followed by expensive failures, and he was bankrupt several times. He was in charge over the years at eighteen London theatres – including the Globe until 1887 and two spells at the Comedy Theatre, 1887–93 and 1896–98. He staged, "with great attention to detail", about a hundred plays. His biographers H H Child and Michael Read list his most celebrated productions as two more adaptations from Moser (The Pickpocket, 1886, adapted by George Hawtrey, and The Arabian Nights, 1887, by Sydney Grundy); Jane (1890) by Harry Nicholls and William Lestocq; One Summer's Day (1897) by H. V. Esmond; Lord and Lady Algy (1898) by R. C. Carton co-starring with the author's wife, Katherine Compton; A Message from Mars (1899) by Richard Ganthony; The Man from Blankley's (1906) by F. Anstey; and Ambrose Applejohn's Adventure (1921) by Walter Hackett, in which Hawtrey played two roles: a respectable modern man and his disreputable ancestor. Hawtrey's career was long enough to allow him to create leading roles in plays by Oscar Wilde in the 1890s and Somerset Maugham after the First World War – he was Wilde's Lord Goring in An Ideal Husband (1895) and William in Maugham's Home and Beauty (1919). In between his successes he went bankrupt several times, and on one occasion discharged his debts by successfully gambling at baccarat.

After the war Hawtrey appeared occasionally in silent films: A Message From Mars (1913) as Horace Parker, Honeymoon for Three (1915) as Prince Ferdinand, and Masks and Faces (1918) with George Alexander, George Bernard Shaw and J. M. Barrie.

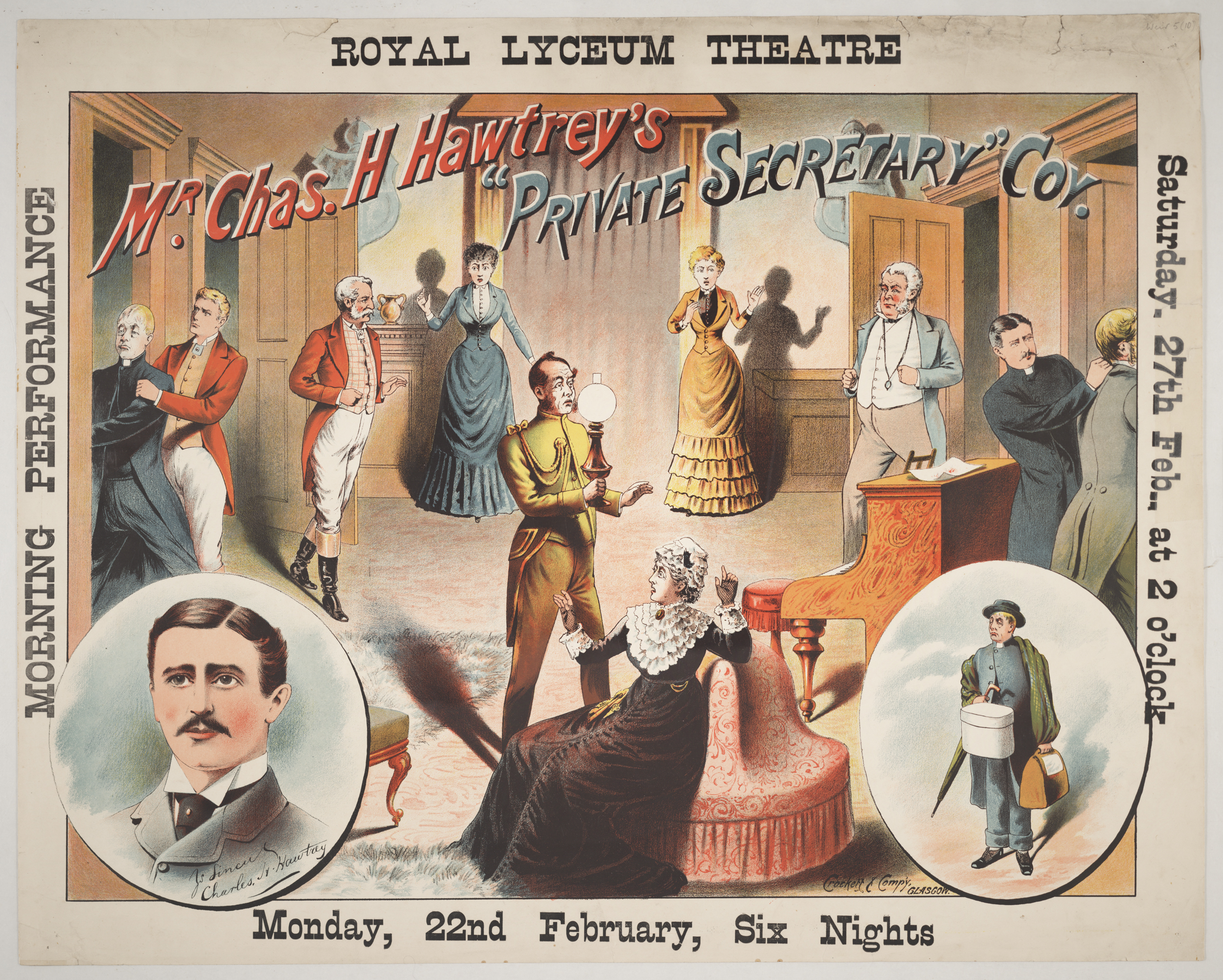
Poster from a performance of Hawtrey's The Private Secretary at the Royal Lyceum Theatre, Edinburgh in 1886

Hawtrey was generous in fostering talent. Among the young actors whose careers he encouraged was Noël Coward, who wrote in his memoirs about "the kindness and care of Hawtrey's direction. He took endless trouble with me ... and taught me during those two short weeks many technical points of comedy acting which I use to this day." One of the dramatists that he promoted was Horace Newte whose one act drama A Labour of Love Hawtrey presented at The Comedy Theatre in 1897.

== Personal life ==
Hawtrey married his first wife Madeline "Mae" Harriet ('née Sheriffe) on the 3 June 1886. Five years later he left her in 1891 and she divorced him in 1893. She died in 1905. In 1909 his then partner, Olive Morris, bore him a son, Anthony Hawtrey. On 10 November 1919 Hawtrey married the Hon Mrs Albert Petre (née Katherine Elsie Clark), daughter of the Rev William Robinson Clark and widow of the youngest son of the 11th Baron Petre. There were no children of either of his marriages. His second wife died on 14 November 1930. According to Ada Coleman, head bartender at the Savoy Hotel London, Hawtrey was responsible for naming the Hanky-Panky cocktail, which she created specifically for him.

In the 1870s he was a proficient association football player, representing the Remnants club in the FA Cup and as club secretary, as well as playing for sister clubs Swifts and St Mark's.

== Last years and posterity ==
From 1920 Hawtrey's health deteriorated. He was knighted in 1922. He lived at 37, Hertford Street, Mayfair, and had lived at Heatham House, Twickenham. He died in a London nursing home after a short illness, aged 64, on 30 July 1923. He is buried at Richmond Old Burial Ground. A memorial service was held for him at St Martin-in-the-Fields. His memoirs were edited by Maugham and published in 1924 as The Truth at Last.

== Notes and references ==
Notes

== Sources ==
- Cellier, François; Bridgeman, Cunningham (1914). Gilbert and Sullivan and Their Operas. London: Sir Isaac Pitman and Sons. OCLC 58942004.
- Coward, Noël (2004) [1937]. Present Indicative. London: Methuen. ISBN 0413774139.
- Hawtrey, Charles (1924). Maugham, W Somerset (ed.). The Truth at Last. London: Butterworth. OCLC 2613292.
- Morley, Sheridan (1986). The Great Stage Stars. London: Angus & Robertson. ISBN 0816014019.
- Parker, John (1925). Who's Who in the Theatre (fifth ed.). London: Sir Isaac Pitman and Sons. OCLC 10013159.
