= St Luke's Church, Canning Town =

Church in Newham, east London, England

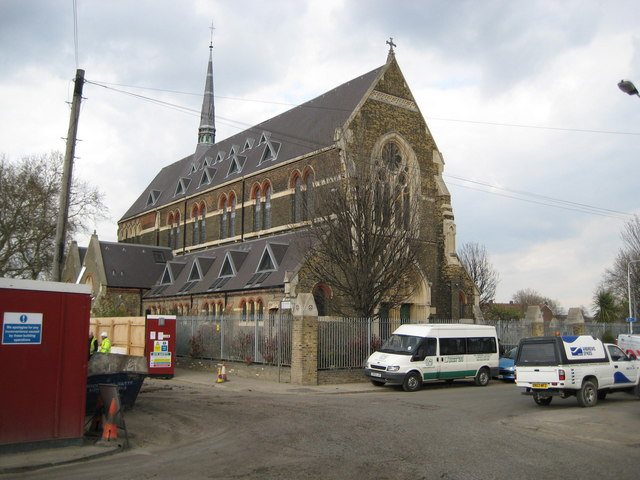
The original building of St Luke's Church, Canning Town

St Luke's Church, Canning Town or St Luke's Church, Victoria Docks is a Church of England church, originally housed in a building on Boyd Road in the Royal Docks area of West Ham in east London.

Planned by Henry Boyd, vicar of St Mark's Church, Silvertown, St Luke's was consecrated in 1875, with a parish split off from St Mark's. Built 1873-5 by Giles and Gane, its neo-Gothic architecture imitates the medieval Early English style and has a flèche rather than a tower. It later took on St Matthew's Church, Custom House (previously a mission of St Mark's itself). It also created a mission church of its own, the Church of the Ascension (1887–1905), a mission to lascar seamen from 1887 and a mission in Ford Park Road by 1890. It is a Grade II listed building, having been listed in 1994.

It was badly damaged in 1940 during the London Blitz, though services continued in a garage and then in the church hall. Temporary repairs to the church in 1949 were followed by permanent reconstruction by 1960. The area was also redeveloped in the postwar period as the Keir Hardie Park, meaning that in 1961 the parish of St Matthew's Church, Custom House and parts of the parishes of Holy Trinity and St Gabriel's were added to that of St Luke's. Deconsecrated in 1985, threatened with demolition in 1993 and closed in 1997, it is now a community centre and health centre. The parish still exists and now worships at a modern building on Ruscoe Road.
