= Jubilee Temple =

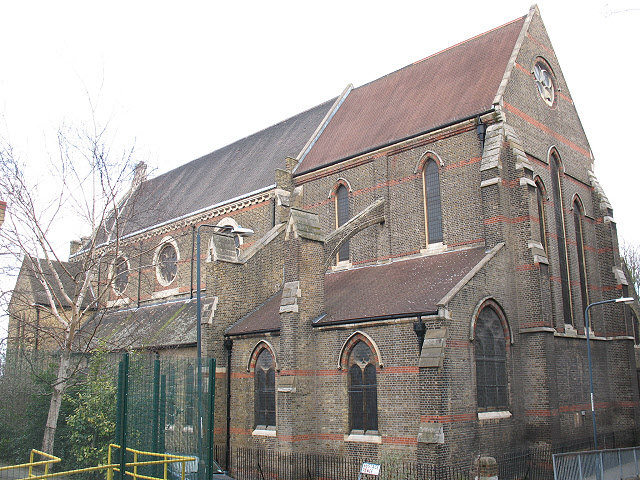
- View of the church's north side and east end.
- Jubilee Temple
- 51°29′25.9″N 0°3′13.2″E
- Location: Borgard Road, Woolwich
- Country: England
- Denomination: The Church of Pentecost
- Previous denomination: Church of England
- Website: https://copuk.org/store/jubilee-piwc/

History
- Former name(s): St Michael and All Angels' Church
- Founded: 1868
- Founder: Hugh Ryves Baker
- Consecrated: 1878 (vestry rooms, organ chamber, chancel and chancel aisle); 1889 (permanent nave); 1899 (west front)

Architecture
- Heritage designation: Grade II
- Designated: 26 March 1954
- Style: Neo-Gothic imitation of 13th century High Gothic

Jubilee Temple is a Church of Pentecost church in Woolwich, London. It is housed in the former Church of England St Michael and All Angels' Church, built in the late 19th century.

== History ==
Hugh Ryves Baker was an Anglican priest who worked at St Mark's Church, Silvertown before being moved to a hill in a slum area just south of Woolwich Arsenal. He initially set up a school and mission church, reusing a former skittle alley, until a large plot was built for a permanent church. Vivian Dering Majendie wrote to Baker:

The very poor and difficult district in which your labours lie … is exposed to evils of a very exceptional, and I fear extensive character, from its immediate proximity to a large, or I should say several large Barracks. This evil cannot be successfully dealt with by the Military Chaplains, however zealous and faithful. It overflows into adjoining neighbourhoods, and must be stemmed and controlled by those who, like yourself stand, so to speak, on the frontier, and have to guard the passes.

A 'tin tabernacle' was placed on the site in 1868–1869, followed by permanent school buildings (1870–1871), probably to a design by W Shepherd, with a schoolkeeper's house by John William Walter, one of Walter's very few identified designs in the UK before he sailed for the USA with Peter Paul Pugin. Fundraising for the permanent church began in 1873 and a foundation stone was laid two years later. Construction then had to pause until 1876 for lack of funds and vestry rooms, organ chamber, chancel and chancel aisle (all designed by Walter) were consecrated in 1878, with a planned tower omitted and the 'tin tabernacle' moved on rollers to act as a temporary nave.

It was granted its own ecclesiastical district in 1879, split off from the ancient parish church of St Mary Magdalene. An existing local house was acquired as a vicarage in 1884 and a permanent nave was finally built in 1888–1889, designed by William Butterfield, and a west front in 1898–1899 by W. D. Caröe to designs by Butterfield. The final addition came in 1955 with a narrow south aisle.

== Bibliography ==
- https://historicengland.org.uk/listing/the-list/list-entry/1218290?section=official-list-entry
- https://www.stmaryswoolwich.co.uk/page7.html
