= A Message from Mars (1913 film) =

1913 British film by J. Wallett Waller

- The film
- Directed by: J. Wallett Waller
- Written by: Richard Ganthony; J. Wallett Waller
- Based on: A Message from Mars by Richard Ganthony
- Produced by: Nicholas Ormsby-Scott
- Production company: United Kingdom Photoplays
- Release date: July 1913
- Running time: 68 minutes
- Country: United Kingdom
- Languages: Silent film English intertitles

A Message from Mars is a 1913 British science fiction silent film directed by J. Wallett Waller. According to the British Film Institute, it is the first British science-fiction film.

The film was written by Waller and Richard Ganthony, based on Ganthony's 1899 play A Message from Mars. The play had been issued as a book in 1912 credited to Lester Lurgan (aka Mabel Knowles) and Ganthony. The story is similar to Charles Dickens' A Christmas Carol of 1843, with the theme that the rich should care for the poor.

Parker is engaged to Minnie Templer, but Minnie has discovered Parker's selfishness and she is on the brink of calling off the engagement.

On Christmas Eve, however, a man from Mars is ordered to come to Earth as a punishment for an unspecified crime, to show Parker the error of his ways. Gradually Parker learns to be kind to people and the man from Mars returns home, forgiven. Minnie and Parker are happily reconciled.

== Restoration ==
In September 2014, the British Film Institute announced that they were publishing the restored film online on their website. This version is longer and restores the film's original tinting and toning.

== Cast ==
- Charles Hawtrey as Horace Parker
- E. Holman Clark as Ramiel
- Chrissie Bell as Minnie Templer
- Frank Hector as Arthur Dicey
- Hubert Willis as a tramp
- Kate Tyndale as Aunt Martha
- Evelyn Beaumont as Bella
- Eileen Temple as Mrs. Claremce
- R. Crompton as the God of Mars
- B. Stanmore as the wounded man
- Tonie Reith as the wounded man’s wife

== Taglines ==
"A fantastical photo-drama, in four parts."

== See also ==
- List of incomplete or partially lost films
- List of films set on Mars
