= A Message from Mars (play) =

1899 play by Richard Ganthoney

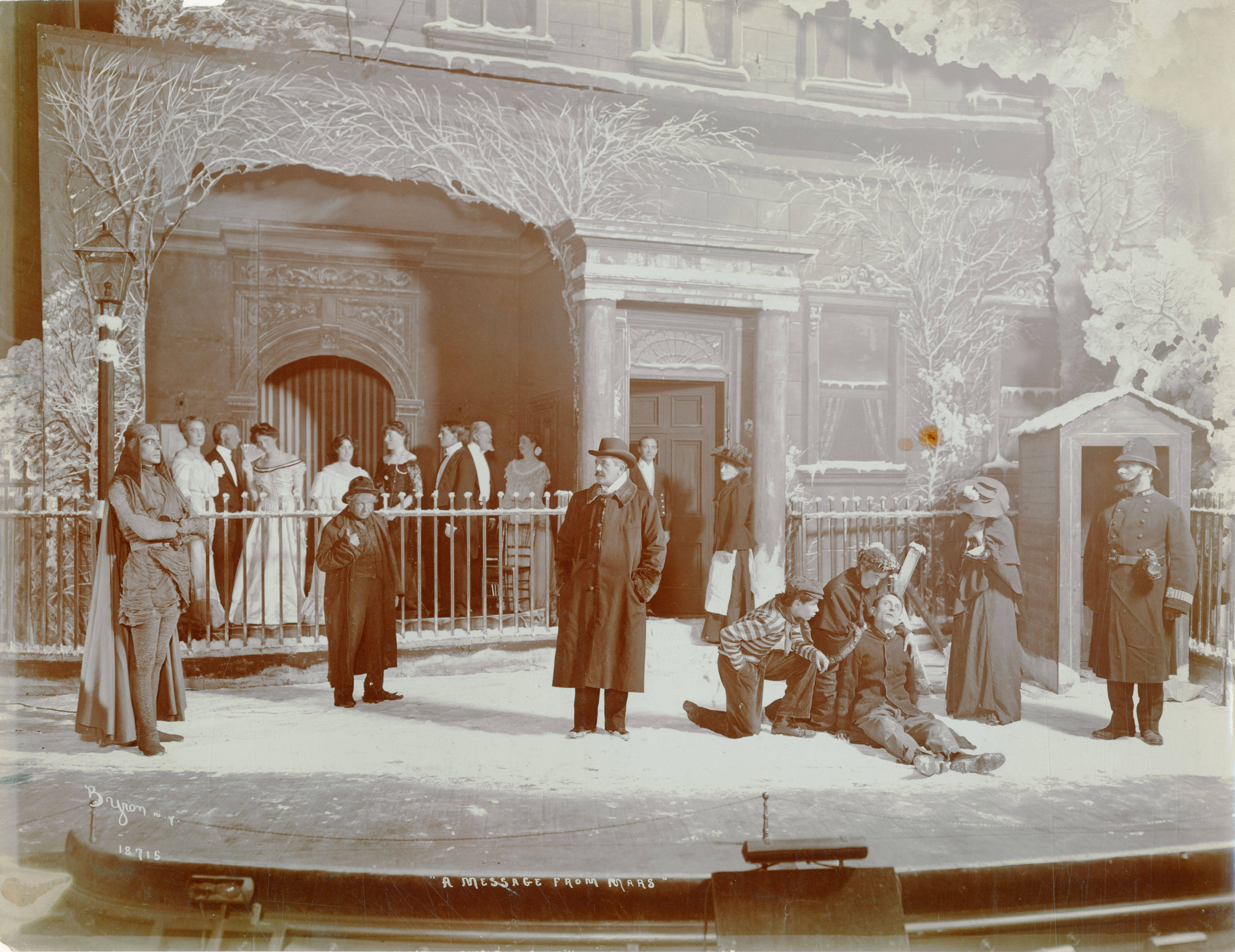
Scene from a 1906 production

A Message from Mars is a play by Richard Ganthony, first performed at London's Avenue Theatre in November 1899.

== Summary ==
The play presents an unusual evening in the life of Horace Parker, a selfish man. Horace refuses to escort Minnie, his ward and fiancee, to a ball because he would prefer to spend his evening at home reading about new discoveries about the planet Mars. Minnie goes to the ball with another escort, leaving Horace home alone. Horace falls asleep and dreams that he is visited by a man, a messenger from Mars. The Messenger sets out to cure Horace of his selfishness. After a series of visions, the Messenger reduces Horace to a beggar in rags. Having realized the error of his ways, Horace awakens a changed man.

== Authorship and controversy ==
Ganthony said that the emphasis on playbuilding came from his acting experiences (in plays like The Cat and the Cherub) and helped shape the elements that were used in A Message from Mars. Ganthony used A Message from Mars to convey the negative consequences of selfishness via exploiting an extremely selfish man while also using astronomy as a tool in conveying these consequences.

Gathony may have drafted the initial script for A Message from Mars as early as 1890 or 1891. After being assisted by Henry Miller, Ganthony was unable to get the play produced on the American stage. To combat this, Ganthony sold his manuscript outright, for £400 (equivalent to £54,255 in 2023), to British comedic actor Charles Hawtrey. Working with his brother George, Hawtrey rewrote the script.

In 1903, Gathony publicly challenged allegations published in The Daily Express that the play's success was entirely due to the revisions Charles and George Hawtrey had made to Ganthony's original script. In court, Ganthony testified that he saw no substantial difference between the play he wrote and the version he saw on stage. Hawtrey, however, claimed that nine-tenths of the dialogue was his own, as were the characters of the policeman and the boy. Ultimately, the court found in favour of Ganthony, awarding him £200 in damages (equivalent to £27,127 in 2023).

== Performance history ==
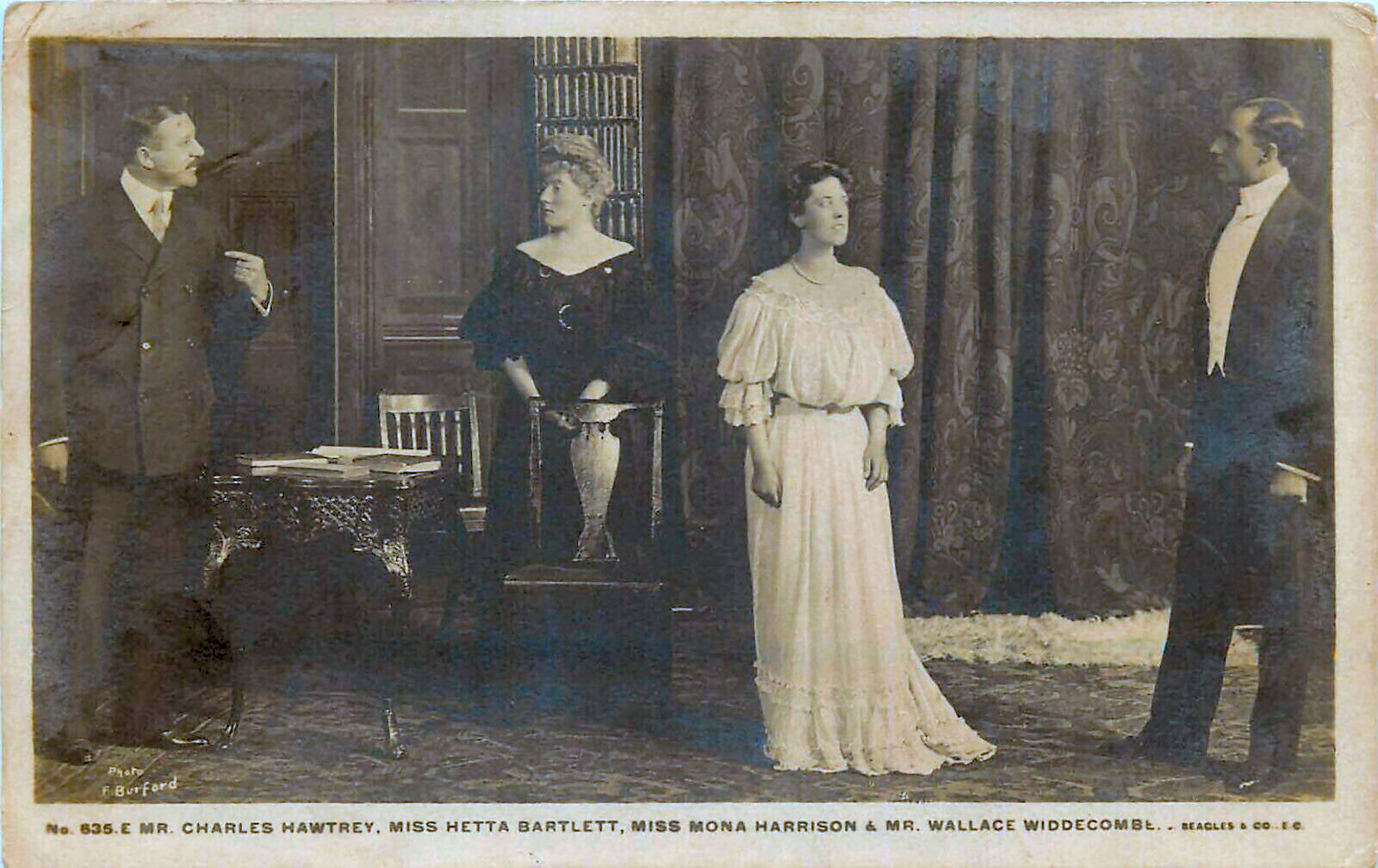
(L to R) Charles Hawtrey, Hetta Bartlett, Mona Harrison and Wallace Widdecombe in A Message from Mars (1905)

A Message from Mars premiered at London's Avenue Theatre in November 1899. Two years later, following a very successful run of more than 500 performances in London, the play and its star performer, Charles Hawtrey, transferred to New York's Garrick Theatre. Between 1903 and 1905, Hawtrey's theater company took the play on tour throughout the United States.

== Adaptations ==
A Message from Mars was filmed in 1903, 1913, and 1921. Charles Hawtrey, who starred in the original stage production, reprised his role as Horace Parker in the 1913 film.

A novelization of the play was written by "Lester Lurgan" (Mabel Winifred Knowles) in 1912. The following year, a second edition was published, illustrated with stills from the 1913 film.

== Legacy ==
Ganthony said that A Message from Mars was the best of the comedic plays that he wrote.
