= A Message from Mars (1921 film) =

1921 film directed by Maxwell Karger

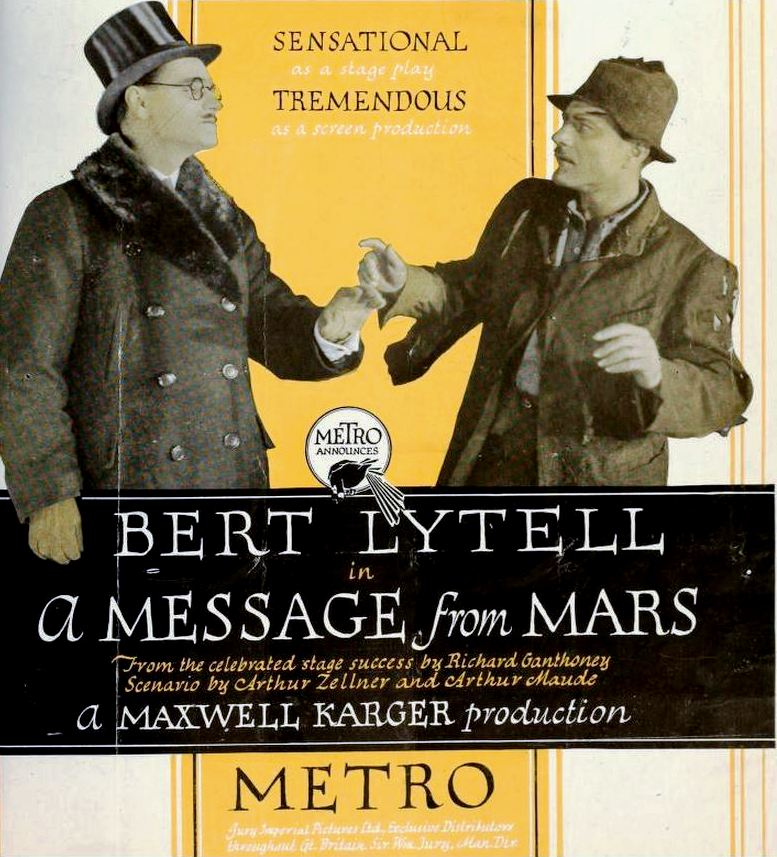
- Advertising for A Message from Mars on The Film Daily (April 17, 1921).
- Directed by: Maxwell Karger
- Written by: Arthur J. Zellner; Arthur Maude
- Based on: A Message from Mars by Richard Ganthony
- Starring: Bert Lytell; Raye Dean; Maude Milton
- Cinematography: Arthur Martinelli
- Production company: Metro Pictures
- Distributed by: Metro Pictures
- Release date: April 11, 1921 (US)
- Running time: 6 reels
- Country: United States
- Languages: Silent film (English intertitles)

A Message from Mars is a 1921 American silent fantasy comedy film directed by Maxwell Karger and starring Bert Lytell, Raye Dean, and Maude Milton. It is based on the 1899 play with the same name by Richard Ganthony. The film was released by Metro Pictures on April 11, 1921.

== Plot ==
Wealthy young Horace Parker, who is an egoist agrees to financing a communicating device which allows for communicating with Mars. He is credited for the invention and he studies his plans rather than go to a party with his fiancée, Minnie. After falling asleep, a messenger from Mars appears to Parker who announces his intentions to convert Parker (who according to the messenger is the earth's most selfish man). Parker is then shown poverty and suffering by the messenger and Parker also overhears Minnie's reproval of him at the party. Parker awakens in a house fire inside the home of a soldier that he once refused help to. Parker ends up rescuing the woman and invites her and other unfortunate people to his home, which also pleases his fiancée.

== Cast ==
- Bert Lytell as Horace Parker
- Raye Dean as Minnie Talbot
- Maude Milton as Martha Parker
- Alphonse Ethier as the messenger (credited as Alphonz Ethier)
- Gordon Ash as Arthur Dicey
- Leonard Mudie as Fred Jones
- Mary Louise Beaton as Mrs. Jones
- Frank Currier as Sir Edwards
- George Spink as the butler

== Production ==
A Message from Mars was shot at Metro's studio on 61st Street in Manhattan. No art director is credited for the film; M.P. Staulcup or Lester J. Vermilyea are held up as likely candidates by historian Richard Koszarski, as both were known to work on Metro's New York films.

== Preservation ==
A print is prepared and preserved by MGM.
