= Samuel McKee (born 1832) =

Union Army colonel (1832–1862)

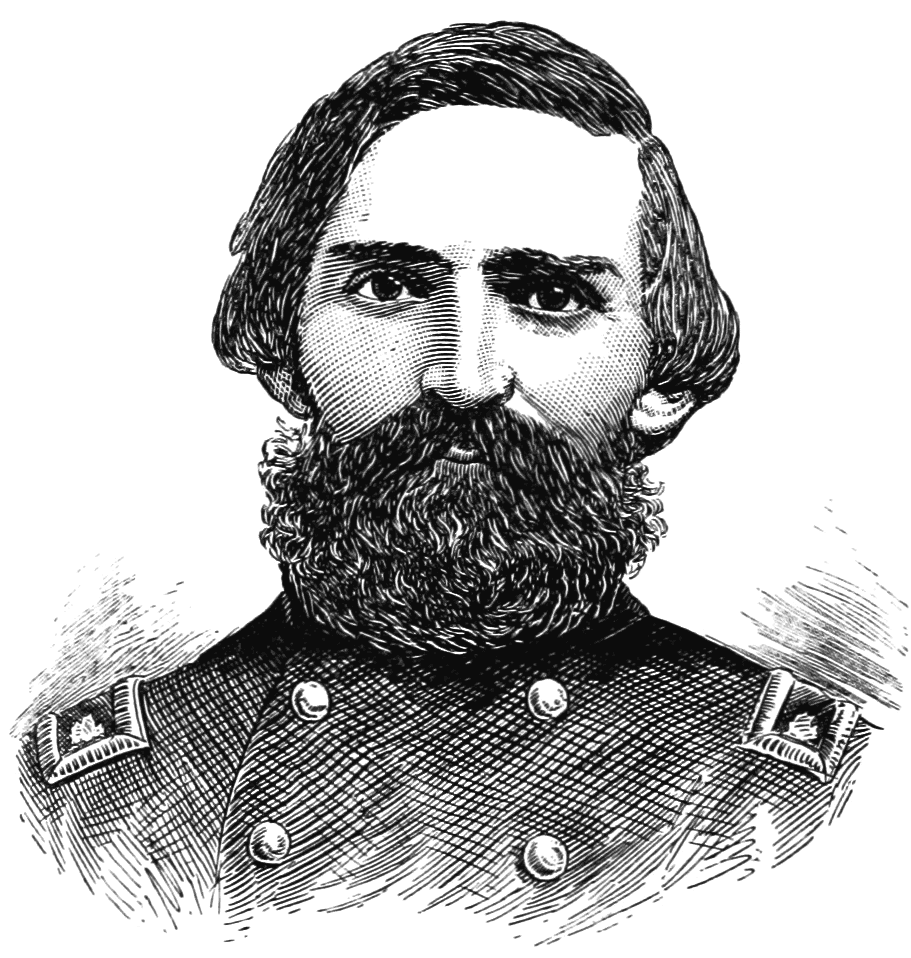
- 1885 illustration of Samuel McKee
- Born: November 10, 1832 near Lancaster, Kentucky
- Died: December 11, 1862 (aged 30); Murfreesboro, Tennessee
- Occupation: Colonel

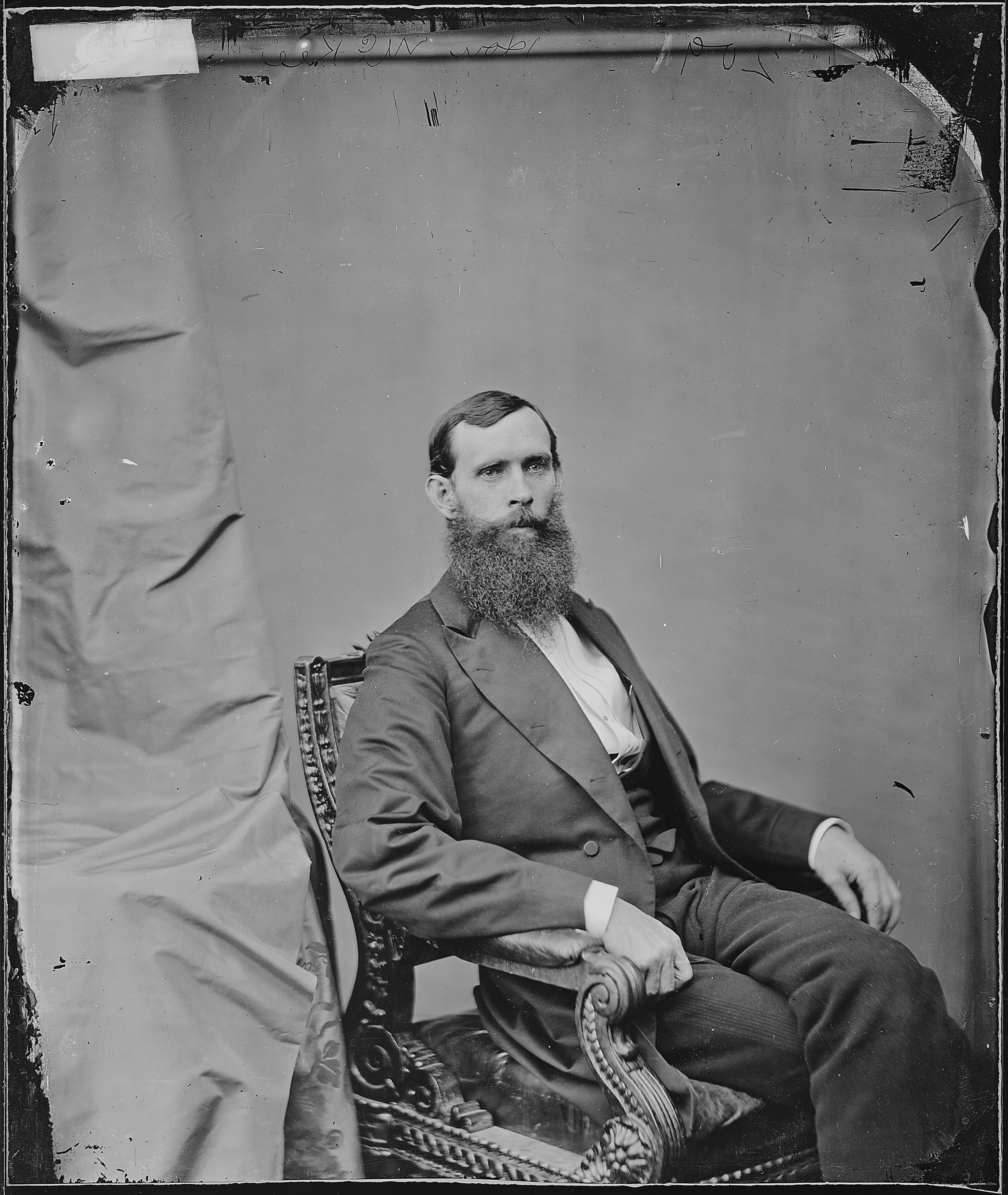
Samuel McKee by Mathew Brady

Samuel McKee (November 10, 1832 – December 11, 1862), the son of James and Mary (Cleland) McKee, was a colonel in the Union Army and served in the 3rd Kentucky Infantry Regiment.

He prepared for college at Danville and went from the preparatory department to college in 1849. In 1859, he commenced the practice of the law (having studied at University of Louisville School of Law), and lived at Keokuk, Iowa, and Memphis, Missouri. At the beginning of the war he entered the Union Army - 3rd Regiment Kentucky Volunteer Infantry as captain, and took part in the Battle of Shiloh. During the campaign in Kentucky in 1862, he was present at the fight of Munfordsville as Lieutenant-Colonel of his regiment. Colonel McKee married Sarah F. Campbell on September 30, 1862. December 27, 1862 he was leading his command as Colonel ordered to take and hold the bridge crossing at Stewarts Creek, in northern Rutherford County, Tennessee on the Jefferson Pike from Confederate forces, but he was killed in action 5 days later on December 31, 1862, at the Battle of Stones River near Murfreesboro, Tennessee.
