= Ralph George Hawtrey =

British economist (1879–1975)

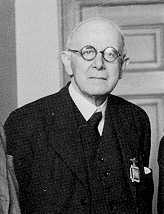
- Education: University of Cambridge
- Awards: Guy Medal in Silver
- Scientific career
- Workplaces: Royal Institute for International Affairs

Sir Ralph George Hawtrey (22 November 1879, Slough – 21 March 1975, London) was a British economist, and a close friend of John Maynard Keynes. He was a member of the Cambridge Apostles, the University of Cambridge intellectual secret society.

He took a monetary approach towards the economic ups and downs of industry and commerce, advocating changes in the money supply through adjustment in the bank rate of interest, foreshadowing the later work of Keynes. In the 1920s, he advocated what was later called the Treasury View. He also advanced in 1931 the concept that became known as the multiplier, a coefficient showing the effect of a change in total national investment on the amount of total national income.

It was his view that the botched attempt to restore the international gold standard led to the Great Depression. He had played a key role in the Genoa Conference of 1922, which attempted to devise arrangements for a stable return to the gold standard.

== Life and career ==
Hawtrey was born in Slough, near London, the only son and last child of George Procter Hawtrey (born 1847/50; died 1910) and his first wife Eda (died 1892), daughter of William Strahan. His father, a schoolmaster, left the profession for acting, where he met no great success; the family's impecuniousness led Ralph Hawtrey to seek the stable employment in the Civil Service. A cousin was the economist Alfred Marshall.

He was educated at Eton and went up to Trinity College, Cambridge in 1898. He graduated in 1901 with first-class mathematics honours. He entered the Admiralty in 1903, then he was moved to the Treasury (1904), where he became director of financial enquiries in 1919. Until his retirement in 1945 he worked in the UK Treasury.

Alfred Marshall took no immediate part in Hawtrey's economic education. His economic education was, for the most part, acquired in the Treasury. However, he had close contacts with the Cambridge economists. Away from economics, he was involved with both the Apostles and with Bloomsbury, whilst within the subject he was a visitor to Keynes's Political Economy Club at Cambridge and Currency and Credit (1919) became a standard work in Cambridge in the 1920s.

He taught at Harvard University as a visiting lecturer from 1928 to 1929 on a special leave from the UK Treasury. After his official retirement in 1945 he was elected Price Professor of International Economics in the Royal Institute for International Affairs a post which he held from 1947 to 1952.

Hawtrey was knighted in 1956.

== Contributions ==
Hawtrey contributed to a number of significant developments in economic analysis, including an original form of the cash balance approach to the quantity theory of money, to which he grafted an income approach, foreshadowing a treatment by John Maynard Keynes. He also advanced, as early as 1931, the concept of multiplier, which was given a central role by Keynes, and, indeed, Hawtrey played a significant role in the development of Keynes's thought in the years between his Treatise and General Theory.

His major contributions related to the quantity theory and the trade cycle. He was one of the first English economists to stress the primacy of credit money rather than metallic legal tender. Furthermore, his income-based approach led to a closer integration of the theories of money and output. For Hawtrey, money income determines expenditure, expenditure determines demand and demand determines prices. Hawtrey summarised his aims in monetary theory in the preface to Currency and Credit.

Scientific treatment of the subject of currency is impossible without some form of the quantity theory … but the quantity theory by itself is inadequate, and it leads up to the method of treatment based on what I have called the consumers’ income and the consumers’ outlay – that is to say, simply the aggregates of individual incomes and individual expenditures. (1919, p. v)

Consumers’ outlays include investment (the result of saving), since investment is spent on fixed capital. The difference between outlays is then consumers’ balances and income, thus only consisting of accumulated cash balances (including money in bank accounts). In addition, a similar demand exists, for money balances by traders related to their turnover. Both consumers’ and traders’ balances may be held by individual agents – Hawtrey notes that the true traders' income is the profits of the business and that this consumers’ income included this.

The ‘unspent margin’, or total money balances, is made of the consumers’ and traders’ balances taken together. From this, he derives a form of the quantity theory. Hawtrey argues that traders’ balances are relatively stable, and thus the supply of money (in a wide sense taken to include credit) and consumers’ income and outlay are concerned with the operational relationships. Compared to the Cambridge income-based approach, his places greater emphasis on the demand for nominal balances rather than real balances. Keynes used a similar balances approach to the quantity theory, after 1925, leading up to the Treatise on Money (1930), in which he distinguishes first between investment and cash deposits and later between income, business and savings deposits.

Hawtrey analysed the demand for money in terms of motives. He identifies a transaction demand, a precautionary demand, and a residual demand which reflects a gradual accumulation of savings balances. He thinks of agents as saving gradually but investing only larger sums periodically. In the meantime, these short-hoards act as a buffer stock. The interest forgone is the main cost of holding money balances, and thus he points to a balancing process between costs and advantages in determining desired balances. The introduction of a banking system into the model allows agents to substitute borrowing power for money balances (Hawtrey, 1919, pp. 36–7).

A concept of effective demand is also introduced by Hawtrey.

The total effective demand for commodities in the market is limited to the number of units of money of account that dealers are prepared to offer, and the number they are prepared to offer over any period of time is limited according to the number they hope to receive. (1919, p. 3)

Hawtrey points to a defect in the theory of an elastic supply of labour based on marginal utilities of product and effort, in Trade and Credit (1928). while a difference between the marginal utility of the product and the disutility of effort may prompt an additional supply of labour "in the simple case of a man working on his own account" (1928, p. 148), Hawtrey argues, this is not the general case since: "the decision as to the output to be undertaken is in the hands of a limited number of employers, and the workmen in the industry are passively employed by them for the customary hours at the prevailing rates of wages" (1928, p. 149). In this case output decisions are based not on the gross proceeds, but on the net profit margin.

=== The gold standard and the Great Depression ===
During World War I, most countries, including the United States, effectively abandoned the gold standard to finance their wartime expenditures. This led to a massive drop in demand for gold and thus a large drop in its value. After the war ended, the countries sought to reconstitute the system. Hawtrey in 1919 and Gustav Cassel (independently in 1920–21) warned that restoring the gold standard without a simultaneous policy of restricting the international monetary demand for gold would push up gold prices and result in a deflationary crisis.

Hawtrey was instrumental in organising the Genoa Conference in 1922, and his and Cassel's cautions were reflected in the resolutions. Cassel proposed that circulation of gold coins should be ended; while this proposal was rejected at the conference, when the UK returned to the gold standard in 1925, circulation of gold coinage was indeed eliminated by Churchill's Gold Standard Act 1925.

In contrast to Hawtrey and Cassel's support for a managed gold standard, Keynes opposed a return to the gold standard. While agreeing with Hawtrey and Cassel that a return to the gold standard would be deflationary in the short run, Keynes believed that it would be inflationary in the long run, and thus unstable. Irving Fisher also thought that the gold standard was unstable and would have undesirable deflationary or inflationary pressures.

For most of the 1920s, the various countries did restrain their demand for gold. In Hawtrey and Cassel's view, at the end of the 1920s, due to the actions of the French central bank and the US Federal Reserve, there was a rapid increase in the price of gold, which meant, under the gold standard, a general deflation. This led to the Great Depression in the late 1920s and 1930s.

Hawtrey and Cassel both recognised the dominant role of the United States in the world economy after World War I. They recommended that the Federal Reserve pursue aggressive monetary policies to counteract the deflationary pressures after 1929. When it became clear that the US was unwilling to pursue such policies, they both recommended that their respective countries (UK and Sweden respectively) leave the gold standard. The UK left the gold standard in September 1931 and Sweden suspended it shortly afterwards, with Cassel playing an important role in the latter.

== Main publications ==
- Good and Bad Trade, 1913.
- Currency and Credit. 1919.
- Monetary Reconstruction, 1922.
- "The Trade Cycle", 1926.
- Trade and Credit, 1928.
- "The monetary theory of the trade cycle", EJ, 1929.
- Trade Depression and the Way Out, 1931
- The Art of Central Banking, 1932.
- The Gold Standard in Theory and Practice, 1933.
- Capital and Employment, 1937.
- A Century of the Bank Rate, 1938.
- "The Trade Cycle and Capital Intensity", EJ, 1940.
- Economic Destiny, 1944.
- Economic Rebirth, 1946.
- "Keynes and Supply Functions", 1956.
- The Pound at Home and Abroad, 1961.
