= Richard Ganthony =

UK playwright and author (1856–1924)

Richard Ganthony (1856–1924) was an actor and playwright. He is best known as the author of the drama A Message from Mars, which premiered in 1899.

== Biography ==
Born in Liverpool, England, in 1856, Richard Ganthony spent most of his career in the United States, moving there when he was very young. On his death in May 1924, at the age of 67, the Malaya Tribune said that Ganthony "was naturally retiring and was not well known in theatrical circles." A Message from Mars was his most popular and best-known play. Ganthony had always said that the best comedy that he ever wrote was A Message from Mars.

== Acting ==
In February 1899, Ganthony played Colonel Sir George Ferrers in Washington, D.C.'s National Theatre production of London Life, a play written by Martyn Field and Arthur Shirley. The play was adapted from the French Le Camelot. He was listed among the cast of London Life at the Columbus Theater in March 1899. Some of his more notable roles were his appearances in Lady of Venice and in Mrs. Dascot.

His big break came in The Cat and the Cherub (Olympia Theatre, New York City, September 1897) where he played the part of Chim Fang, the grim owner of an opium den.

== Playwrighting ==
As a dramatist, Ganthony's first two plays were The Cat and the Cherub (1897) and A Brace of Partridges (1898). Ganthony's brother Robert worked with him in A Brace of Partridges. Ganthony also was the author of The Prophecy. The eye catching elements in some of Ganthony's plays like Message from Mars came from the experiences he had as an actor which showed him the importance on play building. Ganthony convinced Henry Miller to get Message to Mars out of storage which led to Ganthony convincing Charles Hawtrey to produce the play in England. While writing Message from Mars, Ganthony decided to exploit the most selfish man alive while also using astronomy to teach the viewer about the ills of selfishness.

In 1903, Ganthony was awarded £200 in libel damages from a court due to a false claim by the Daily Express stating that George Hawtrey had rewritten A Message from Mars before it became successful.

In 1912 "A Message from Mars" was published as a book creditted to Lester Lurgan and Ganthony.

== Personal life ==
Ganthony's sister, Nellie, also was in the entertainment industry. Ganthony also was the brother in law of Marie Dressler. Ganthony started to retire during his last years and he died of an illness in May 1924 in Richmond.
