= Imperial Palace (novel) =

1930 novel by Arnold Bennett

- First edition (Cassell, 1930)
- Author: Arnold Bennett
- Language: English
- Genre: Novel
- Published: October 1930
- Publisher: Cassell & Company (UK); Doubleday, Doran & Co. (US)
- Publication place: England
- Pages: 625
- OCLC: 363070

Imperial Palace is the last and longest novel by Arnold Bennett, first published in October 1930 by Cassell & Company in London and by Doubleday, Doran & Co. in New York. Set in a grand London hotel modelled on the Savoy Hotel, the novel portrays the daily workings of the establishment through the eyes of its director, Evelyn Orcham, while interweaving a romantic subplot and a corporate merger negotiation. Bennett dedicated the novel to George Reeves-Smith, the Savoy's long-serving managing director, and conducted extensive on-site research at the hotel in preparation for writing it.

The novel was commercially successful, reaching its eighth edition by August 1933, but was overshadowed by Vicki Baum's best-selling novel Menschen im Hotel (Grand Hotel), published in English the same year, which was later adapted into the Academy Award-winning film Grand Hotel (1932).

== Background ==
Bennett was a frequent guest at the Savoy Hotel and a regular diner at the Savoy Grill, where the Omelette Arnold Bennett was created in his honour by the chef Jean Baptiste Virlogeux around 1929. He confessed that his early ambition had been to manage a grand hotel, and he spent many months of research at the Savoy in preparation for the novel, circulating his photograph among the hotel's departments so that staff would recognise him and allow him to observe their work undisturbed. The Savoy's directors assisted Bennett in his preliminary research, giving him access to the inner workings of the establishment.

Bennett had previously set novels in fictional hotels inspired by the Savoy: The Grand Babylon Hotel (1902) and The Regent (1913). The novel was dedicated "To George Reeves-Smith, from one of the warmest of his admirers"; Sir George Reeves-Smith had been the managing director of the Savoy since 1900 and would remain so until his death in 1941. In a prefatory note, Bennett stated that the book's eighty-five speaking characters were "entirely fictitious, except one, which is a very partial portrait of a man now dead". The fictional chef Rocco was based on Virlogeux.

== Plot ==
The novel is set over a period of several months in the late 1920s at the Imperial Palace, a fictitious super-luxury hotel in London located between St James's Park and Parliament Square. Its protagonist, Evelyn Orcham, is the hotel's director, a widower who has devoted his life to the establishment with single-minded intensity.

The action begins in the early hours of the morning as Orcham descends into the hotel's great front hall. He is introduced to Gracie Savott, the young and capricious daughter of Sir Henry Savott, a wealthy investor who arrives at the hotel with plans to negotiate a merger of European luxury hotels. Orcham accompanies Gracie on a dawn visit to Smithfield Market with the hotel's meat buyer, Jack Cradock, and is immediately captivated by her. The novel follows the daily operations of the hotel in extensive detail—from the housekeepers' management of hundreds of rooms, to the kitchens, the laundry, the publicity department, and the rivalries and hierarchies among the staff—while Orcham is drawn into a relationship with the mercurial Gracie. Their affair culminates in a trip to Paris, but Orcham finds himself ill at ease away from the hotel.

Running parallel to the romance is the business subplot of Sir Henry's proposed hotel merger, which would make Orcham director of a chain of luxury hotels. Throughout, the novel also develops the character of Violet Powler, the hotel's capable and devoted head housekeeper, whose dedication to the Imperial Palace matches Orcham's own. The novel culminates with Orcham recognising that Violet, rather than the glamorous but unsuitable Gracie, is his natural companion.

== Critical reception ==
Imperial Palace was commercially successful upon publication, with the Cassell edition reaching its eighth printing by August 1933. R. B. Singh described it as Bennett's "last important work, noted for its 'romantic human interest' and craftsmanship". Stanley Jackson, in his history The Savoy: The Romance of a Great Hotel (1964), called it "an admirable documentary novel… that rung down the curtain on the 1920s when the Savoy enjoyed such prosperity before a troubled decade".

The novel has been praised for its detailed and sympathetic depiction of the inner workings of a luxury hotel, which occupies the greater part of its 625 pages. Critics have noted its quasi-documentary quality, with Bennett lavishing attention on the logistics of hotel management—from meat procurement at Smithfield to the subtle hierarchies among housekeepers and the techniques of the publicity department—in a manner that anticipated later workplace fiction. However, the romantic subplot involving Gracie Savott has been less favourably received. The novel was overshadowed at the time by Vicki Baum's Menschen im Hotel, published in English the same year, which offered a more compact treatment of the hotel setting and was adapted into the successful 1932 film Grand Hotel.

== Adaptations ==
In 1969, the BBC broadcast a four-part television dramatisation of the novel, adapted by Michael Voysey and directed by Paddy Russell. Roy Dotrice starred as Evelyn Orcham, with Cyril Luckham as Sir Henry Savott, Hildegard Neil as Gracie Savott, and Anna Cropper as Violet Powler. An NBC Theater radio dramatisation was also produced.
