= 1890 by Gordon Ramsay =

French restaurant in London, England

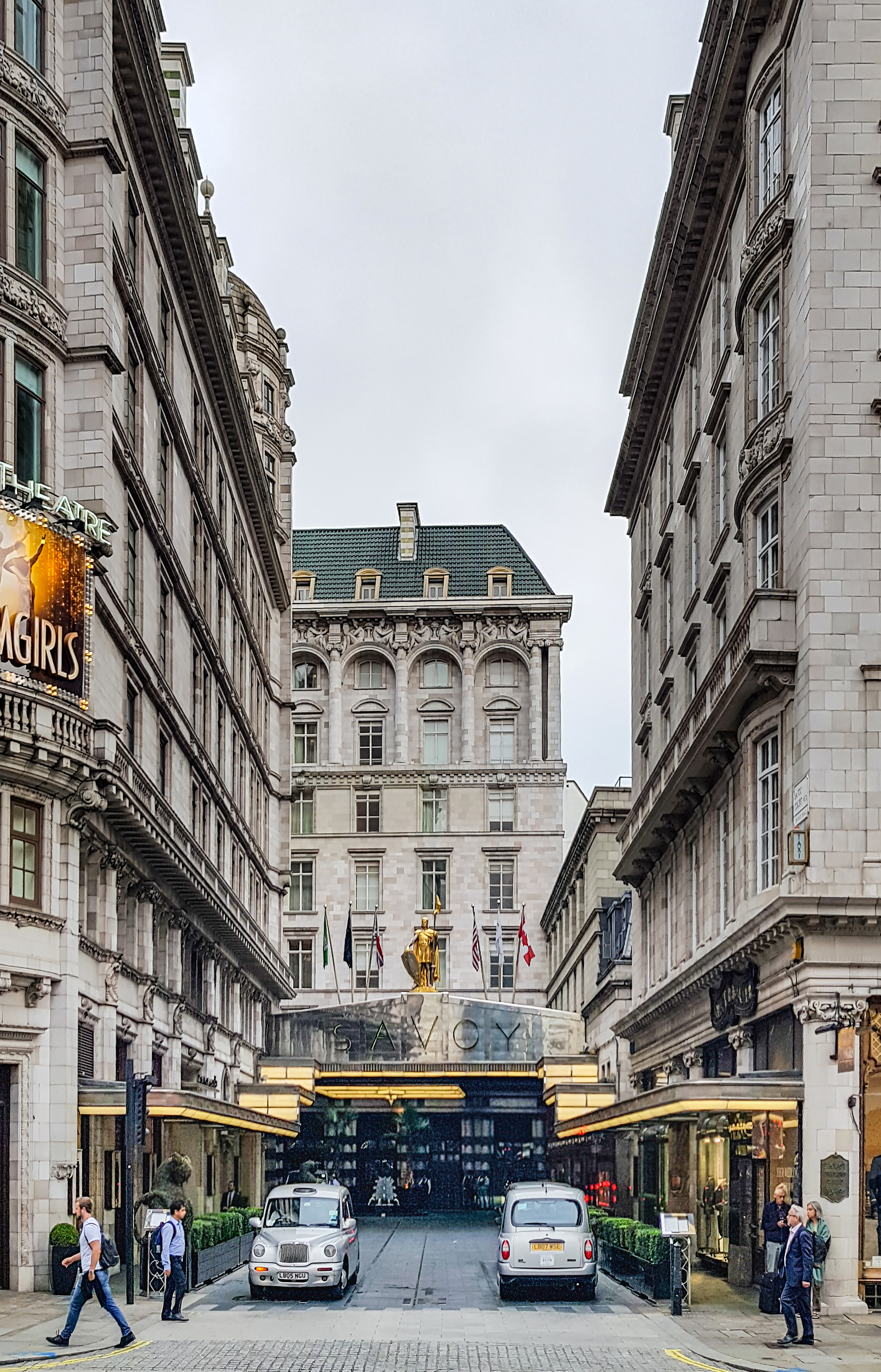
- The Savoy Hotel, where the restaurant is located
- Interactive map of 1890 by Gordon Ramsay

Restaurant information
- Established: February 2022
- Food type: French
- Rating: 1 Michelin star
- Location: Savoy Hotel, Strand, London, United Kingdom
- Coordinates: 51.5102°N 0.1206°W
- Website: www.gordonramsayrestaurants.com/restaurant-1890/

1890 by Gordon Ramsay is a Michelin-starred French restaurant in London, United Kingdom.

The restaurant was established in 2022 by Gordon Ramsay in partnership with the Savoy Hotel in which it is located. The restaurant was named in honour of chef Auguste Escoffier who began working at the hotel in 1890. It was first awarded a Michelin star in 2024.

== See also ==
- List of Michelin-starred restaurants in Greater London
