= Decision at Midnight =

1963 British film by Lewis Allen

- Film poster
- Directed by: Lewis Allen
- Written by: Alan Thornhill
- Produced by: Lewis Allen; Scoville Wishard
- Starring: Martin Landau; Nora Swinburne; Walter Fitzgerald
- Cinematography: Harold Rosson
- Edited by: Harry Marker
- Music by: Paul Dunlap
- Release date: 1963
- Running time: 93 minutes
- Countries: United Kingdom; United States
- Language: English

Decision at Midnight (also known as Music at Midnight) is a 1963 American-British drama film directed by Lewis Allen and starring Martin Landau, Nora Swinburne and Walter Fitzgerald.

== Plot ==
Adaptation of the play 'Music at Midnight', of an Iron Curtain country revolutionary leader who is inspired to talk over things with the dictator after the revolt has failed and come to a mutual arrangement. (BFI synopsis.)

== Cast ==
- Martin Landau as Nils
- Nora Swinburne as Margaret
- Walter Fitzgerald as Prime Minister
- Torin Thatcher as Southstream
- Esmond Knight as Peter Hauser
- John Forrest as Stephen
- Oscar Beregi Jr. as Chief Marshal
- David Janti as Kurtz
- Charles Cameron as Ambassador
- Violet Rensing as Lena
- Rudolph Anders as Uncle
- Hilary Wontner as Forbes
- Donald Simpson as Head waiter
- William Pawley Jr. as Reporter

== Bibliography ==
- Goble, Alan. The Complete Index to Literary Sources in Film. Walter de Gruyter, 1999.
