= Hugh Wontner =

English hotelier and politician (1908-1992)

Sir Hugh Wontner in 1975

Sir Hugh Walter Kingwell Wontner (22 October 1908 – 25 November 1992) was an English hotelier and politician. He was managing director of the Savoy hotel group from 1941 to 1979 and its chairman from 1948 to 1984, continuing as president until his death. He was also chairman of the Savoy Theatre from 1948 until his death. In 1973–74, he was Lord Mayor of London.

Wontner was appointed general secretary of the Hotels and Restaurants Association of Great Britain in 1933 at the age of 25. He shepherded the Savoy hotel group properties through the difficult World War II years, restoring their lustre after the war, and successfully preserved the group's independence against take-over bids in the 1950s, 1970s and 1980s. As chairman of the Savoy Theatre, he personally supervised its rebuilding after it was destroyed by fire in 1990.

Wontner was closely involved in the City of London as a leading member of two of its ancient guilds and as alderman, chief magistrate and Lord Mayor. He was knighted in 1972.

== Biography ==
=== Early years ===
Wontner was the elder son of the actor-manager Arthur Wontner and his first wife, the actress Rose Pendennis, whose real name was Rosecleer Alice Amelia Blanche, née Kingwell. He was born Hugh Walter Kingwell Wontner Smith, but his father changed the family name in 1909, dropping the "Smith". Wontner was educated at Oundle School and in France, but was not, he said later, an academic pupil. His younger brother was the actor Hilary Wontner.

After working in the Hôtel Meurice in Paris, Wontner joined the secretariat of the London Chamber of Commerce from 1927 to 1933. In 1933, at the age of 25, he was appointed general secretary of the Hotels and Restaurants Association of Great Britain. In 1936 Wontner married Catherine née Irvin. They had two sons and one daughter.

=== Savoy Group ===
Wontner's work with the Hotels and Restaurants Association brought him into close contact with Sir George Reeves-Smith, managing director of the Savoy hotel group, who was the association's founder chairman. Reeves-Smith was impressed by Wontner's administrative abilities, and, as The Times noted, "the young man had other qualities also which appealed to the veteran managing director: a discerning palate for wines, a taste for travel, and a consuming passion for the theatre.... Wontner must have seemed ideal Savoy material." In 1938 he invited Wontner to join the group as his assistant. When Reeves-Smith died at the age of 77 in May 1941, Rupert D'Oyly Carte, the Savoy chairman, had no doubts about the succession and appointed the 32-year-old Wontner as managing director of the Savoy group, which included the Berkeley and Claridges hotels as well as the Savoy.

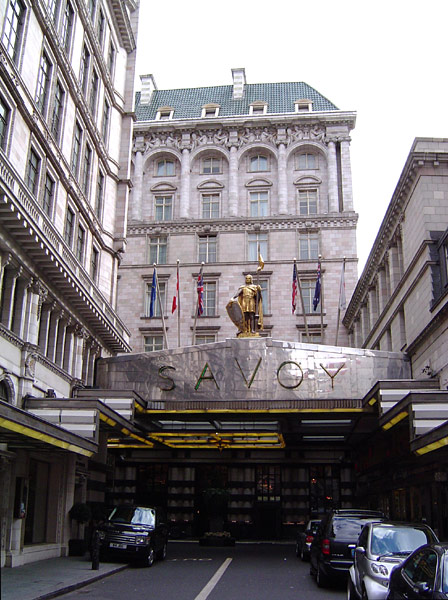
The Savoy Hotel

Carte died in 1948, and as his heir, Bridget D'Oyly Carte, did not wish to become chairman, the Savoy board elected Wontner, the first person to combine the roles of chairman and managing director since the Savoy's founder, Richard D'Oyly Carte. Wontner remained managing director until 1979 and chairman until 1984. He was elected life president of the group in 1990.

When Wontner took over, World War II was at its height, and he and his staff had to cope with bomb damage, food rationing, manpower shortage, and, at first, a serious decline in the number of foreign visitors. After the U.S. entered the war, business picked up as the Savoy Hotel became a favourite of American officers, diplomats, journalists and others. The hotel became a meeting place for war leaders: Lord Mountbatten, Charles de Gaulle, Jan Masaryk and General Wavell were among the regular Grill Room diners, and the hotel's air-raid shelters were "the smartest in London". Wontner co-operated fully with the government's wartime restrictions, helping to draw up an order imposing a five shilling limit on the price of a restaurant meal and advising the government on managing the change from wartime rationing to peacetime conditions.

After the war, Wontner set about restoring the standards of the Savoy group to their pre-war glory, investing a great deal of capital in repairing war damage, upgrading facilities and enhancing the prestige of the hotels in the group. Under his control Claridges became a home in London for numerous statesmen, from President Tito and King Hussein to Gandhi, while the Savoy attracted such show business stars as Frank Sinatra and Sophia Loren and was visited by British royalty including George VI and Elizabeth II. Under Wontner's leadership, the group bought the Connaught Hotel in 1956, and in the early 1960s decided to relocate the Berkeley from Piccadilly to new premises in Knightsbridge for an opening in 1972. Wontner was cautious about expanding the Savoy group internationally, concerned that over-expansion might prejudice standards, but in 1970 he added the Lancaster Hotel in Paris to the group.

=== Business methods ===
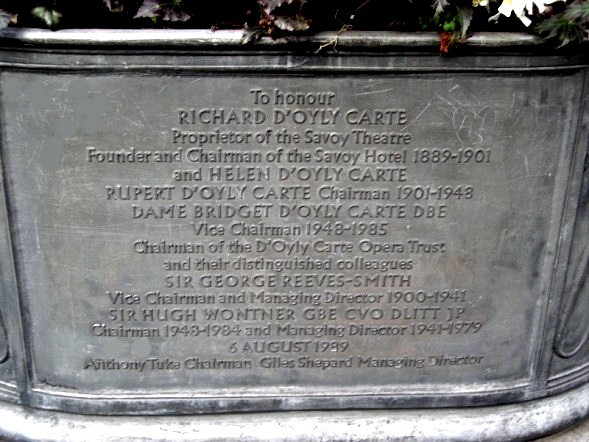
Planter in the embankment gardens between the hotel and the river, commemorating Wontner's tenure

Throughout his career, according to The Times, "Wontner was admired by business associates for his acumen, integrity and loyalty while being accused by his critics of aloofness and arrogance. Beneath a genial manner there certainly lay steely determination and a fair degree of ruthlessness." Under his leadership, the Savoy group successfully fought off several hostile takeover bids using, on occasion, controversial stratagems to defeat the bidder. In 1953 the entrepreneur Charles Clore attempted to buy the Savoy group, and when his bid was rejected he sold his shares to the property developer Harold Samuel, who planned to redevelop the Piccadilly site of the Berkeley Hotel. Wontner temporarily transferred possession of the freehold of the Berkeley from the Savoy group to its staff pension fund until the bid was withdrawn.

After this first attempted takeover, Wontner insured against future bids by issuing new shares in the group which carried 40 times as many votes each as the normal shares. These special shares were held by Bridget D'Oyly Carte, Wontner and their allies. The financial magazine The Economist found this ploy outrageous: "On grounds of principle, it is difficult to find condemnation too severe for what the Savoy Hotel board have done. They have taken, without the consent of their shareholders, a valuable property in which the shareholders have an equity and of which the best use is open to dispute. They have made it impossible for the shareholders ... to exert any control in future over the disposition of that property." Nevertheless, Wontner's share structure enabled the board to defeat later takeover bids by Trafalgar House and Trusthouse Forte. During the latter, Charles Forte managed to acquire 69 per cent of the group's shares, but only 42 per cent of the voting rights, and was furious at being outwitted by Wontner, whom he accused of having "a great gift for supercilious indifference". Having thwarted this final takeover bid, Wontner retired from his executive roles and accepted the position of president of the Savoy group.

=== Other interests and honours ===
Wontner had many other interests, prominent among which was the City of London, where he was at various times the Master of two Livery Companies, an alderman of the City Corporation, chief magistrate and, in 1973–74, Lord Mayor. He advised the royal household on its catering at Buckingham Palace and elsewhere, and in 1953 was appointed Clerk of the Royal Kitchens – the first holder of the post since the early nineteenth century. He also inherited his father's love of the theatre and served as a member of the board of trustees of the D'Oyly Carte Opera Company and of the committee of the Barbican Centre. He was proud of being a member of the Old Stagers, England's oldest amateur dramatic society, and of his association with the Savoy Theatre, of which he was chairman and managing director from 1948 until his death. When the theatre was destroyed by fire in 1990 Wontner personally supervised the reconstruction. The topping-out ceremony gave him great pleasure, and only a few days before his death he was looking forward to presiding over the re-opening in 1993.

He was the recipient of many international honours, including Honorary Citizen of St Emilion, 1974; Freeman of the Seychelles, 1974; Order of Cisneros (Spain), 1964; Officer, L'Étoile Equatoriale (Gabon), 1970; Médaille de Vermeil, City of Paris, 1972; Ordre de l'Étoile Civique (France), 1972; Officier du Mérite Agricole (France), 1973; Commander, National Order of the Leopard (Zaire), 1974; Knight Commander, Order of the Dannebrog (Denmark), 1974; Order of Loyalty to the Crown of Malaysia, 1974; Knight Commander, Royal Swedish Order of the Polar Star, 1980; and a Knight of the Venerable Order of Saint John, 1973. His British honours were MVO 1950, CVO 1969, Knight Bachelor 1972, and GBE 1974.

Wontner died of a heart attack in London, aged 84.

== Notes ==
Honorary titles
Preceded by Alan Mais, Baron Mais	Lord Mayor of London; 1973–1974	Succeeded by Sir Murray Fox
