= Savoy Hotel =

Historic luxury hotel in London, England

Coordinates: 51°30′36″N 0°07′13″W

The Savoy

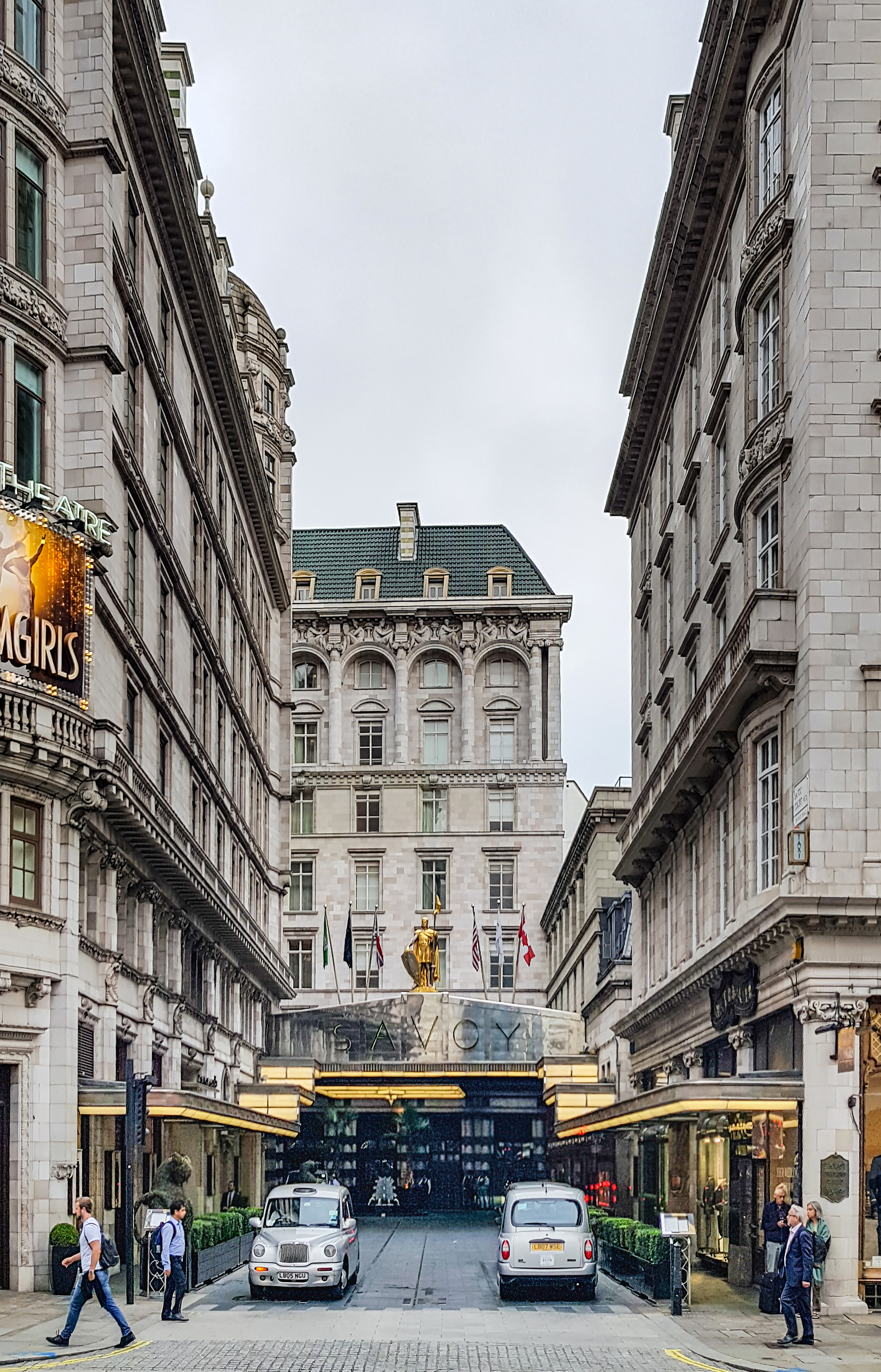
- The Savoy's main entrance from Strand

General information
- Type: Hotel
- Architectural style: Art Deco
- Location: Strand, City of Westminster, London, England
- Named for: Liberty of the Savoy
- Construction started: 1886
- Opened: 6 August 1889; 137 years ago
- Owner: Kingdom Holding (50%); FRHI and Katara (50%)
- Operator: Fairmont Hotels and Resorts

Design and construction
- Architect: Thomas Edward Collcutt
- Developer: Richard D'Oyly Carte
- Other designers: Arthur H. Mackmurdo (interior consultant)

Other information
- Number of rooms: 267
- Number of restaurants: 5 (Savoy Grill; Simpson’s in the Strand; River Restaurant; Restaurant 1890; Thames Foyer)
- Number of bars: 3 (American Bar; Beaufort Bar; The Bar at Simpson’s)
- Facilities: Swimming pool and gym
- Parking: Valet parking
- Public transit: Charing Cross

Website
- thesavoylondon.com

Listed Building – Grade II
- Official name: The Savoy Hotel
- Designated: 16 January 1981
- Reference no.: 1236709

The Savoy Hotel is a luxury hotel located in the Strand in the City of Westminster in central London, England. Built by the impresario Richard D'Oyly Carte with profits from his Gilbert and Sullivan opera productions, it opened on 6 August 1889. It was the first in the Savoy group of hotels and restaurants owned by Carte's (Note: Carte is the family name. The biographer Arthur Jacobs emphasises that "D'Oyly" was his "forename (not part of a double surname)".) family for over a century. The Savoy was the first hotel in Britain to introduce electric lights throughout the building, electric lifts, bathrooms in most of the lavishly furnished rooms, constant hot and cold running water and many other innovations.

Carte hired César Ritz as its manager and Auguste Escoffier as its chef de cuisine. Together they established a higher standard of quality in hotel service, entertainment and dining in London, which attracted royalty and other guests and diners from the international political, social and business elites.

The hotel became Carte's most successful venture. Its bands, Savoy Orpheans and the Savoy Havana Band, became famous, and other entertainers (who were also often guests) included George Gershwin, Frank Sinatra, Lena Horne and Noël Coward. Other famous guests have included Edward VII, Oscar Wilde, Enrico Caruso, Charlie Chaplin, Babe Ruth, Harry Truman, Joan Crawford, Judy Garland, John Wayne, Laurence Olivier, Marilyn Monroe, Humphrey Bogart, Elizabeth Taylor, Barbra Streisand, Bob Dylan, Bette Midler, the Beatles and many others. Winston Churchill often took his cabinet to lunch at the hotel.

The hotel is managed by Fairmont Hotels and Resorts. It has been called "London's most famous hotel". It has 267 guest rooms and panoramic views of the River Thames across Savoy Place and the Thames Embankment. The hotel is a Grade II listed building.

== History ==
=== Site ===
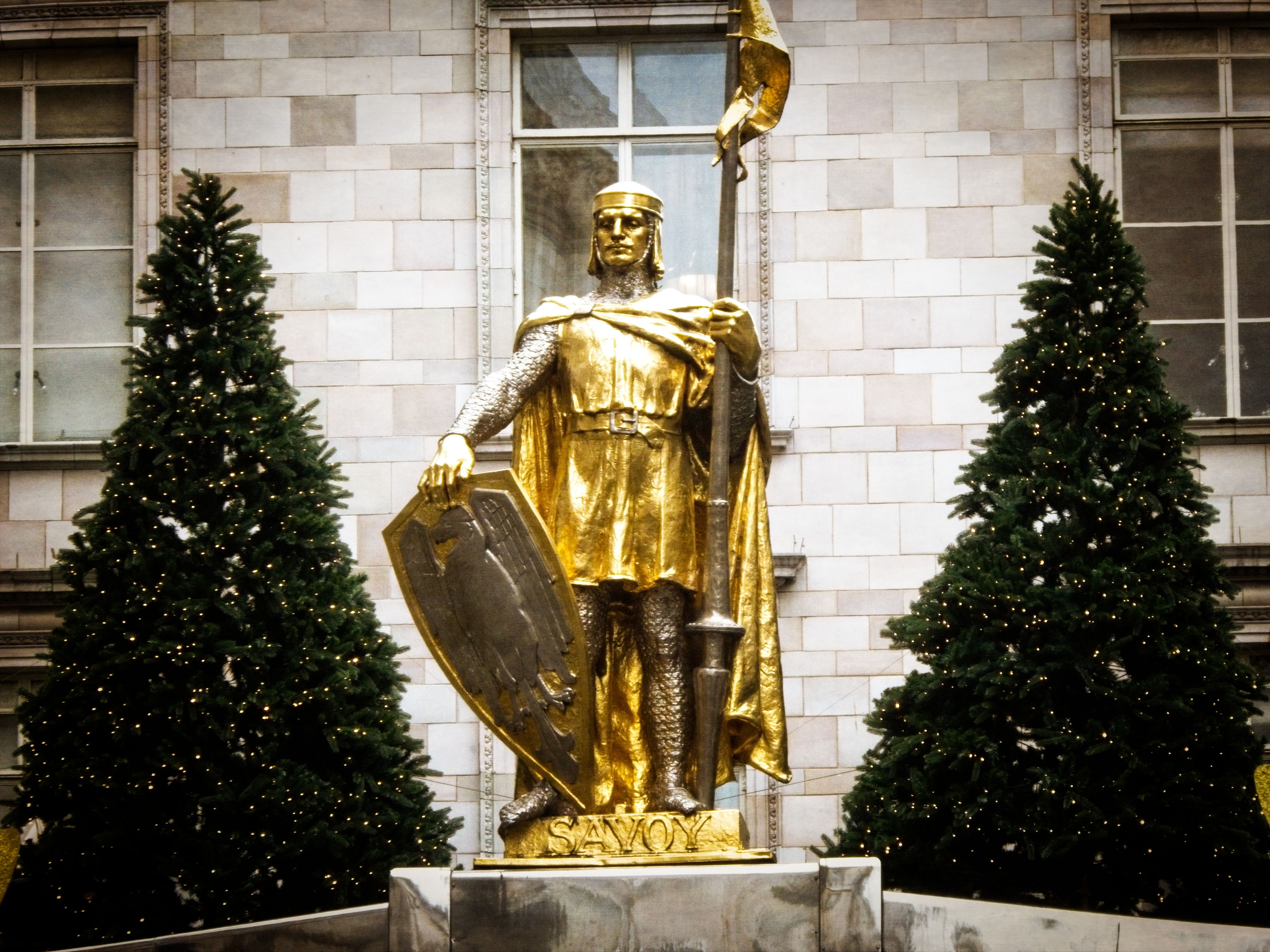
Statue of Peter, Count of Savoy, located at the entrance of the Savoy Hotel.

The House of Savoy was the ruling family of Savoy, descended from Humbert I, Count of Sabaudia (or "Maurienne"), who became count in 1032. The name Sabaudia evolved into "Savoy" (or "Savoie"). Peter (or Piers or Piero) Count of Savoy (d. 1268) was the maternal uncle of Eleanor of Provence, queen-consort of Henry III of England, and came with her to London.

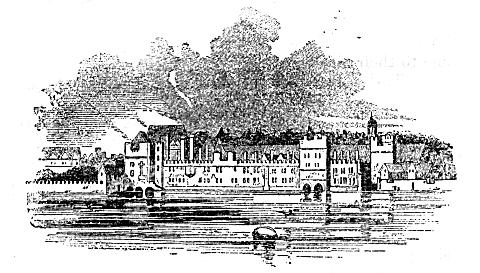
The Savoy Palace

King Henry III made Peter Earl of Richmond and, in 1246, gave him the land between the Strand and the River Thames, where Peter built the Savoy Palace in 1263. Peter gave the palace and the manor of the Savoy to the Congregation of Canons of the Great Saint Bernard, and the palace became the "Great Hospital of St Bernard de Monte Jovis in Savoy". The manor was subsequently purchased by Queen Eleanor, who gave the site to her second son, Edmund, Earl of Lancaster. Edmund's great-granddaughter, Blanche, inherited the site. Her husband, John of Gaunt, 1st Duke of Lancaster, built a magnificent palace that was burned down by Wat Tyler's followers in the Peasants' Revolt of 1381. King Richard II was still a child, and his uncle John of Gaunt was the power behind the throne, and so a main target of the rebels.

About 1505, Henry VII planned a great hospital for "pouer, nedie people", leaving money and instructions for it in his will. The hospital was built in the palace ruins and licensed in 1512. Drawings show that it was a magnificent building, with a dormitory, dining hall and three chapels. Henry VII's hospital lasted for two centuries, but suffered from poor management. The sixteenth-century historian Stow noted that the hospital was being misused by "loiterers, vagabonds and strumpets". In 1702, the hospital was dissolved, and the hospital buildings were used for other purposes. Part of the old palace was used as a military prison in the eighteenth century. In the nineteenth century, the old hospital buildings were demolished, and new buildings were erected.

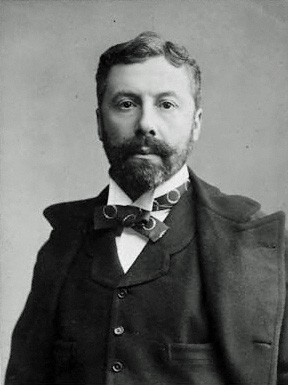
Richard D'Oyly Carte

In 1864, a fire burned everything except the stone walls and the Savoy Chapel. The property sat empty until the impresario Richard D'Oyly Carte bought it in 1880, to build the Savoy Theatre specifically for the production of the Gilbert and Sullivan operas, of which he was the producer.

=== Early years ===
Having seen the opulence of American hotels during his many visits to the United States, Carte decided to build a luxury hotel in Britain, to attract a foreign clientele as well as British visitors to London. Opened in 1889, the hotel was designed by architect Thomas Edward Collcutt, who also designed the Wigmore Hall. Carte chose the name "Savoy" to commemorate the history of the property. His investors in the venture were, in addition to his relatives, Carl Rosa, George Grossmith, François Cellier, George Edwardes, Augustus Harris and Fanny Ronalds. His friend, the composer Sir Arthur Sullivan, was a shareholder and sat on the board of directors.

The hotel was built on a plot of land, next to the Savoy Theatre, that Carte originally purchased to house an electrical generator for the theatre (built in 1881), which was the first public building in the world to be lit entirely by electricity. The construction of the hotel took five years and was financed by the profits from the Gilbert and Sullivan partnership, particularly from The Mikado. It was the first hotel in Britain lit by electric lights and the first with electric lifts. Other innovations included en-suite marble bathrooms with hot and cold running water in most of its 268 rooms; glazed brickwork designed to prevent London's smoke-laden air from spoiling the external walls; and its own artesian well.

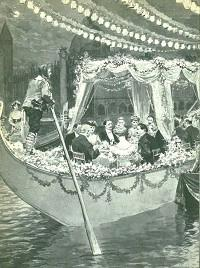
Gondola party, 1905

At first the Savoy did well, but within six months of opening, the hotel was losing money. The board of directors instructed Carte to replace the management team, headed by W. Hardwicke as manager and M. Charpentier as chef de cuisine. As manager he engaged César Ritz, later the founder of the Ritz Hotel; Ritz brought in the chef Auguste Escoffier and the maître d'hôtel Louis Echenard and put together what he described as "a little army of hotel men for the conquest of London"; Escoffier recruited French cooks and reorganised the kitchens. The Savoy under Ritz and his partners soon attracted distinguished and wealthy clientele, headed by the Prince of Wales. Aristocratic women, hitherto unaccustomed to dining in public, were now "seen in full regalia in the Savoy dining and supper rooms". The hotel became such a financial success that Carte bought other luxury hotels.

At the same time, Ritz continued to manage his own hotels and businesses in Europe. Nellie Melba, among others, noted that Ritz was less focused on the Savoy. In 1897, Ritz and his partners were dismissed from the Savoy. Ritz and Echenard were implicated in the disappearance of over £3,400 (equivalent to £380,000 at 2025), of wine and spirits, and Escoffier had been receiving gifts from the Savoy's suppliers. In a 1938 biography of her husband, Ritz's widow maintained that he resigned and that Escoffier, Echenard, and other senior employees resigned with him. This fiction was perpetuated for many years, with the consent of the Savoy company. In fact, however, after a damning report by the company's auditors and the advice of the prominent lawyer, Sir Edward Carson, that it was the board's "imperative duty to dismiss the manager and the chef", Carte handed Ritz, Escoffier and Echenard letters of dismissal:

By a resolution passed this morning you have been dismissed from the service of the Hotel for, among other serious reasons, gross negligence and breaches of duty and mismanagement. I am also directed to request that you will be good enough to leave the Hotel at once.

Ritz threatened to sue the hotel company for wrongful dismissal, but was evidently dissuaded by Escoffier, who felt that their interests would be better served by keeping the scandal quiet. It was not until 1985 that the facts became public knowledge.

The Savoy group purchased Simpson's-in-the-Strand in 1898. The next year, Carte engaged M. Joseph, proprietor of the Marivaux Restaurant in Paris, as his new maître d'hôtel and in 1900, appointed George Reeves-Smith as the next managing director of the Savoy hotel group. Reeves-Smith served in this capacity until 1941.

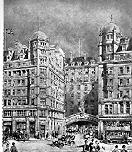
Savoy hotel, Strand entrance, 1911

After Richard D'Oyly Carte died in 1901, his son Rupert D'Oyly Carte became chairman of the Savoy hotel group in 1903 and supervised the expansion of the hotel and the modernisation of the other hotels in the group's ownership, such as Claridge's. The expansion of the hotel in 1903–04 included new east and west wings, and moving the main entrance to Savoy Court off the Strand. The additions pioneered the use of steel frame construction in London. At that time, the hotel added Britain's first serviced apartments, with access to all the hotel's amenities. Many famous figures became residents, such as Sarah Bernhardt and Sir Thomas Dewar, some of whom lived there for decades. Spectacular parties were held at the hotel. For example, in 1905 the American millionaire George A. Kessler hosted a "Gondola Party" where the central courtyard was flooded to a depth of four feet, and scenery was erected around the walls. Costumed staff and guests re-created Venice. The two dozen guests dined in an enormous gondola. After dinner, Enrico Caruso sang, and a baby elephant brought in a five-foot birthday cake.

When the hotel was expanded, Rupert D'Oyly Carte decided to develop a luxurious, handcrafted bed unique to the Savoy and his other hotels. His Savoy Bed, also called the No. 2 Bed, was covered in a ticking whose design is attributed to his stepmother, Helen Carte. In 1924, the hotel bought James Edwards Limited, the manufacturer of the bed. Later, the Savoy Group sold the company, which became Savoir Beds in 1997. Savoir Beds continues to make the Savoy Bed for the hotel.

1899, Guccio Gucci worked at the Savoy as a luggage porter before founding his fashion house in 1921.

=== 1913 to World War II ===
After the death of Helen Carte in 1913, Rupert D'Oyly Carte became the controlling stockholder of the hotel group. In 1919, he sold the Grand Hotel, Rome, which his father had acquired in 1894 at the urging of Ritz. For the Savoy, he hired a new chef, François Latry, who served from 1919 to 1942. In the 1920s he ensured that the Savoy continued to attract a fashionable clientele by a continuous programme of modernisation and the introduction of dancing in the large restaurants. It also became the first hotel with air conditioning, steam-heating and soundproofed windows in the rooms, 24-hour room service and telephones in every bathroom. It also manufactured its own mattresses. One famous incident during Rupert's early years was the 1923 shooting, at the hotel, of a wealthy young Egyptian, Prince Fahmy Bey, by his French wife, Marguerite. The widow was acquitted of murder after it was revealed that her husband had treated her with extreme cruelty throughout the six-month marriage and had stated that he was going to kill her.

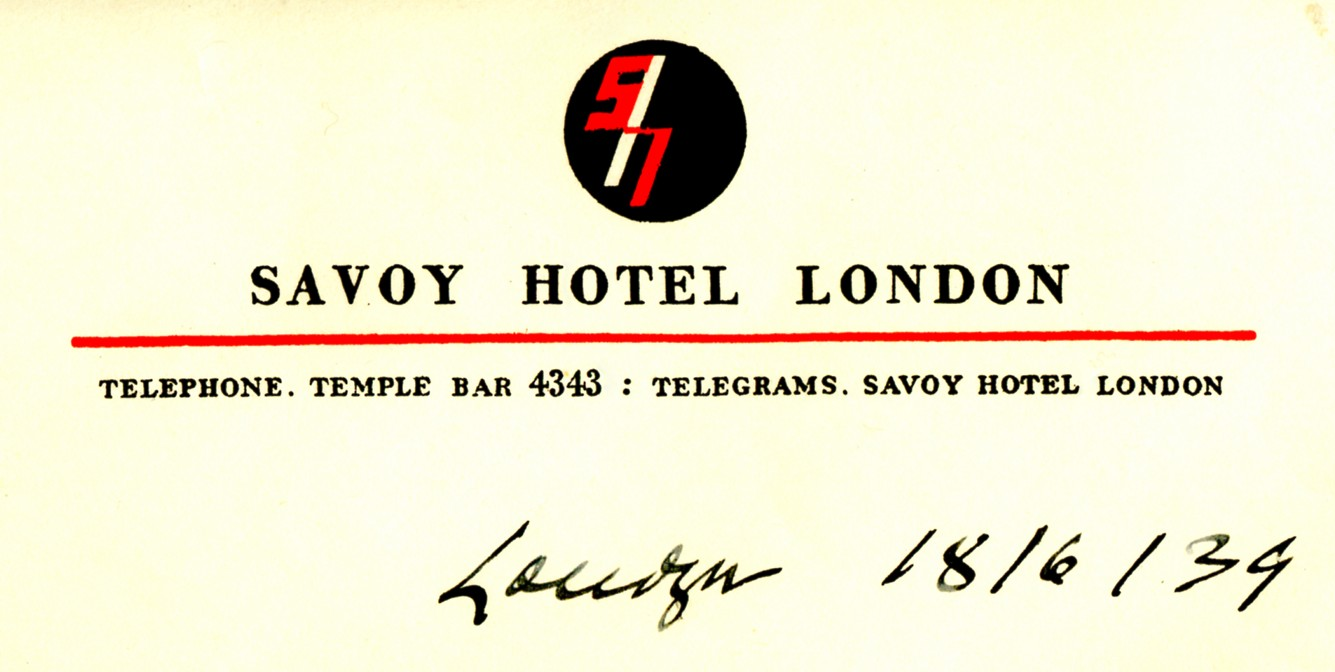
Savoy Hotel letterhead, 1939

Until the 1930s, the Savoy group had not thought it necessary to advertise, but Carte and Reeves-Smith changed their approach. "We are endeavouring by intensive propaganda work to get more customers; this work is going on in the U.S.A., in Canada, in the Argentine and in Europe." In 1938 Hugh Wontner joined the Savoy hotel group as Reeves-Smith's assistant, and he became managing director in 1941.

During World War II, Wontner and his staff had to cope with bomb damage, food rationing, manpower shortage and a serious decline in the number of foreign visitors. After the US entered the war, business picked up as the Savoy became a favourite of American officers, diplomats, journalists and others. The hotel became a meeting place for war leaders: Winston Churchill often took his cabinet to lunch at the hotel, Lord Mountbatten, Charles de Gaulle, Jan Masaryk and General Wavell were among the regular Grill Room diners, and the hotel's air-raid shelters were "the smartest in London". Wontner cooperated fully with the government's wartime restrictions, helping to draw up an order imposing a five-shilling limit on the price of a restaurant meal.

=== 1946–2007 ===
After World War II, the Savoy Group experienced a strike of its employees in support of a waiter dismissed from the hotel. The matter was judged so serious that the government set up a court of inquiry. Nevertheless, the hotel continued to attract celebrities. In 1946, Wontner set up "The Savoy Management Scheme", a school to train hoteliers, that was maintained for half a century. The last major appointments of Rupert D'Oyly Carte's chairmanship were Wyllie Adolf Hofflin, general manager from 1941 to 1960, and August Laplanche, head chef from 1946 to 1965. When Carte died in 1948, his daughter Bridget did not wish to become chairman, accepting instead the vice-chairman position, and the Savoy board elected Wontner, the first person to combine the roles of chairman and managing director since the Savoy's founder, Richard D'Oyly Carte. Wontner remained managing director until 1979 and chairman until 1984, and he was president thereafter until 1992.

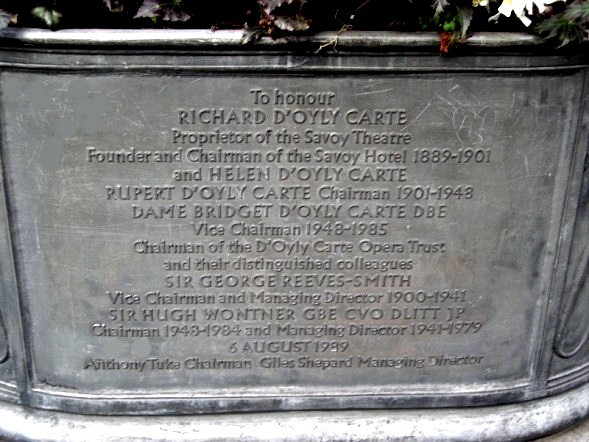
Planter in the embankment gardens between the hotel and the river honouring the Carte family and other persons historically important to the hotel (1989)

To mark Queen Elizabeth II's coronation on 2 June 1953, the hotel hosted the Savoy Coronation Ball, attended by 1,400 people, including Hollywood stars, royalty and other notables, who paid 12 guineas (equivalent to £306 as of 2025), each. Sixteen Yeomen Warders from the Tower of London lined the entrance staircase. The interior of the Savoy was decked in hundreds of yards of dove-grey material and heraldic banners in scarlet, blue and yellow. The design was supervised by Bridget D'Oyly Carte, whose fellow organisers included Cecil Beaton and Ninette de Valois. The cabaret was under the direction of Laurence Olivier, Noël Coward and John Mills.

Under Wontner's leadership, the Savoy appointed its first British head chef, Silvino Trompetto, who was maître-chef from 1965 to 1980. Giles Shepard (1937–2006), succeeded Wontner as managing director from 1979 to 1994 and helped to defend the Savoy Group against Charles Forte's attempt to take control of the Board in the 1980s. Forte gained a majority of the shares, but was unable to take control due to the company's ownership structure. Shepard also introduced competitive salaries for the staff, increased international marketing of the hotel, and led the Savoy's centenary celebrations. Ramón Pajares was managing director from 1994 to 1999. The Savoy continued to be a popular meeting place. "Le tout London was there it seemed, from film stars to businessmen to politicians, all staying or being entertained at the grand old fun palace on the Strand."

Bridget D'Oyly Carte died childless in 1985, bringing an end to her family line. In 1998, an American private equity house, The Blackstone Group, purchased the Savoy hotel group. They sold it in 2004 to Quinlan Private, who sold the Savoy hotel and restaurant Simpson's-In-The-Strand eight months later, for an estimated £250 million, to Al-Waleed bin Talal to be managed by Al-Waleed's affiliate, Fairmont Hotels and Resorts of Canada. Quinlan's group retained the rest of the hotels under the name Maybourne Hotel Group.

=== 2010 refurbishment to present ===
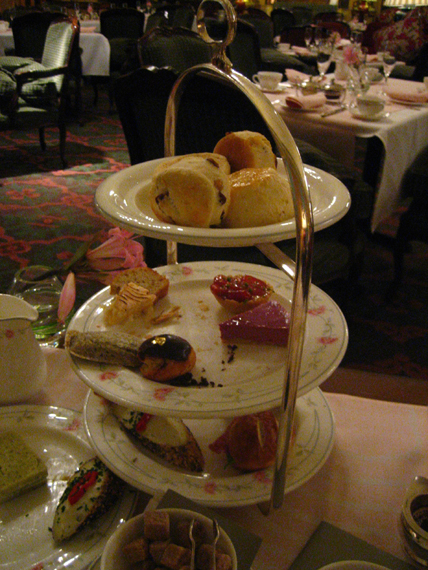
Afternoon tea at the hotel

In December 2007, the hotel closed for a complete renovation, the cost of which was budgeted at £100 million. The hotel conducted a sale of 3,000 pieces of its famous furnishings and memorabilia. The projected reopening date was delayed more than a year to October 2010, as structural and system problems held up construction. The building's façade required extensive stabilisation, and the cost of the renovations grew to £220 million. The new energy-efficient design reduced the hotel's electricity usage by approximately 50% and reuse and recycling increased.

The new design features a Thames Foyer with a winter garden gazebo under a stained-glass cupola with natural light, which is the venue for late-night dining and the hotel's famous afternoon tea. The glass dome had been covered since World War II. A new teashop and patisserie is called Savoy Tea, and a glass-enclosed fitness gallery with rooftop swimming pool, gym and spa are located above the Savoy Theatre. The new Beaufort Bar has an Art Deco interior of jet-black and gold and offers nightly cabaret. The River Restaurant (now renamed Kaspar's), facing the Thames, is also decorated in the Art Deco style, but the American Bar is nearly unchanged. The rooms are decorated in period styles harmonised with the adjacent hallways, and they retain built-in wardrobes and bedroom cabinets. The decor is Edwardian on the Thames river side and Art Deco on the Strand side. Butler service was also reintroduced to the hotel. Gordon Ramsay manages the Savoy Grill with Stuart Gillies as Chef Director and Andy Cook as Head Chef. In a nod to the hotel's origins, six private dining rooms are named after Gilbert and Sullivan operas. The hotel contains a small museum next to the American Bar, open to the public, with a revolving exhibition of items from the hotel's archives. A motor launch is available to take small parties from the Savoy Pier in front of the hotel for champagne river tours.

The critic for The Daily Telegraph wrote: "The Savoy is still The Savoy, only better. ... [The rooms] are calm ... you are the personality, not the room. ... [The hotel is] a saviour of The Strand I suspect now. The lobby is bigger and grander, and JUST THE SAME." A review in The Guardian noted that reception "now is sheer sleight of hand. ... In under five minutes I have been expertly drawn into the world of Savoy. [Furniture and furnishings] conspire to enhance my stay". While the same reviewer found the spa disappointing, she gave highest marks to the hotel's personalised service, the Savoy Tea, afternoon tea in the Thames Foyer, and the Beaufort bar, concluding: "The Savoy is back where it belongs – right on top." The Savoy Grill, however, lost its Michelin star and reopened to mixed reviews. Three years after the reopening, the owners announced that business had been disappointing, and the hotel was in jeopardy of closing. The hotel celebrated its 125th anniversary in 2014, at which time it received a glowing review from the London Evening Standard.

== Notable guests ==
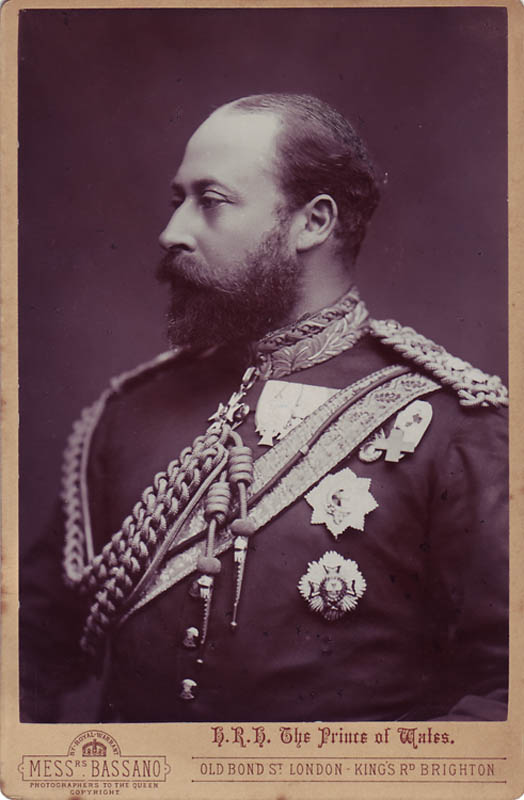
The future king Edward VII was an early guest.

Numerous notable guests have stayed at the hotel. Claude Monet and James Whistler both painted or drew views, from their Savoy rooms, of the River Thames. The Savoy featured prominently in guest Oscar Wilde's trial for gross indecency. Other celebrity guests in the hotel's early decades included the future King Edward VII, Sarah Bernhardt, Enrico Caruso, Lillie Langtry, H. G. Wells, George Bernard Shaw, Nellie Melba, Charlie Chaplin, Al Jolson, Errol Flynn, Fred Astaire, Marlene Dietrich, Lionel Barrymore, Harry Truman, Audrey Hepburn, Judy Garland, Josephine Baker, Cary Grant, Babe Ruth, Ivor Novello and Noël Coward. The hotel kept records of its guests' preferences, so that it could provide for them in advance. For Coward, the staff made history by taking the first photographs of a hotel guest's toilet articles so that they could lay them out in his bathroom exactly as he liked them. They made sure to provide a fireproof eiderdown quilt to Barrymore, as he always smoked while reading in bed.

Bob Dylan stayed in the hotel in 1965 and filmed the video clip "Subterranean Homesick Blues" in an adjacent alley. Laurence Olivier and Vivien Leigh met at the hotel. Frank Sinatra, Marilyn Monroe, John Wayne, Louis Armstrong, Humphrey Bogart, Elizabeth Taylor, Richard Burton, Maria Callas, Coco Chanel, Christian Dior, Sophia Loren, Julie Andrews, Lena Horne, Marlon Brando, Jane Fonda, Barbra Streisand, Jimi Hendrix, the Beatles, Elton John, U2, Led Zeppelin, the Who, George Clooney, Whoopi Goldberg and Stephen Fry are just a few of the celebrities who stayed there in recent decades. Richard Harris lived at the hotel for the last several years of his life. While being carried out on a stretcher before he died, he joked, "It was the food."

== The arts ==
=== Fine art ===
The Savoy hotel has long been associated with the arts. Whistler stayed in 1896 with his wife Beatrix and painted eight lithograph views of the Thames from his top-floor room. Monet stayed at the hotel on three occasions in 1899, 1900 and 1901, and served as the hotel's first artist-in-residence. He worked on paintings there including views of Charing Cross Bridge (1899–1901) and Waterloo Bridge (1903). 26 pastels survive from his visits to the hotel. A study in 2010 concluded that Monet had stayed in rooms 610–611 in 1899 and later in 510–511, although the Savoy markets rooms 512 and 513 as their "Monet Suite".

The artist-in residence position has continued in the 21st century. For example, in 2012, the British artist, David Downes, worked in the hotel's lobby to create a large-scale drawing, displayed in the hotel's front hall, depicting the Thames Diamond Jubilee Pageant. The following year, South African artist Jonty Hurwitz created a chrome and resin anamorphic sculpture of Kaspar, the hotel's cat mascot, titled "The 14th Guest", found at the entrance to the hotel's restaurant, Kaspar's Seafood Bar & Grill. Kaspar's story begins with the legend of an 1898 dinner at the Savoy given for 14 guests by Woolf Joel, a South African diamond tycoon. One of the diners was unable to attend, leaving the number of guests an unlucky 13, and another diner predicted that whoever first left the table would soon die. The first to leave was Joel, who was shot dead a few weeks later in Johannesburg. After this, the hotel offered to seat a member of its staff at tables of 13 to ward off bad luck. Finally, in 1926, the designer Basil Ionides sculpted a 3-foot high art-deco black cat called Kaspar, which is used as the 14th guest. Kaspar is given a full place setting, a napkin is tied around his neck, and he is served each course. Winston Churchill liked Ionides's Kaspar so much that he insisted that the sculpture join his parties of any size when dining at the Savoy.

=== Music ===
The hotel established its first dinner dances in 1912, laying a dance-floor in the centre of the Thames Foyer in time to take advantage of the popularity of the tango, which exploded in 1913. William de Mornys became head of entertainment after the First World War and helped set up the Savoy Havana Band and the Savoy Orpheans dance band, led by Debroy Somers. The bands were described in The Times as "probably the best-known bands in Europe", and they broadcast regularly from the hotel. The BBC, which had set up its Savoy Hill studios next to the hotel in 1922, took full advantage of the proximity. George Gershwin gave the British premiere of Rhapsody in Blue at the hotel in 1925, simultaneously broadcast on BBC radio.

Rupert D'Oyly Carte engaged Richard Collet to run the cabaret at the Savoy, which opened in April 1929. In 1931 Carroll Gibbons took over as leader of the Orpheans, continuing until 1950 when he became the hotel's Director of Entertainments until his death in 1954. Ian Stewart then became head of the hotel's music, retiring in 1978.

Lena Horne and others made their British debuts there. Frank Sinatra, who regularly stayed at the hotel, played the piano and sang there. The 1960s and 1970s saw cabaret appearances from artists including Cilla Black, Sandie Shaw and The New Seekers. Traditional dinner, dancing and cabaret evenings came to an end in 1980. But in 2013, the hotel reintroduced its dinner dances, with resident dance band Alex Mendham & His Orchestra playing music from the 1920s and '30s.

=== In films and novels ===
The hotel has often been used as a film location. For example, the romantic finale to Notting Hill (1999) is set in the hotel's Lancaster Room, where Anna (Julia Roberts) and William (Hugh Grant) declare their mutual love. In 1921, the hotel was used in the film Kipps, based on the novel by H. G. Wells. It also featured in The French Lieutenant's Woman (1981), Entrapment (1999) and Gambit (2012), among others. In 2011, the hotel was used as the setting for Duran Duran's music video for their song "Girl Panic!" from their album All You Need Is Now.

Arnold Bennett wrote the novel Imperial Palace in 1930, based on his research at the hotel. The novel fictionalises the hotel's operations. Michael Morpurgo wrote a children's book fictionalising the hotel's mascot, Kaspar, as an adventurer: Kaspar: Prince of Cats (2008), which was released in the US as Kaspar: The Titanic Cat (2012).

== Restaurants and bars ==
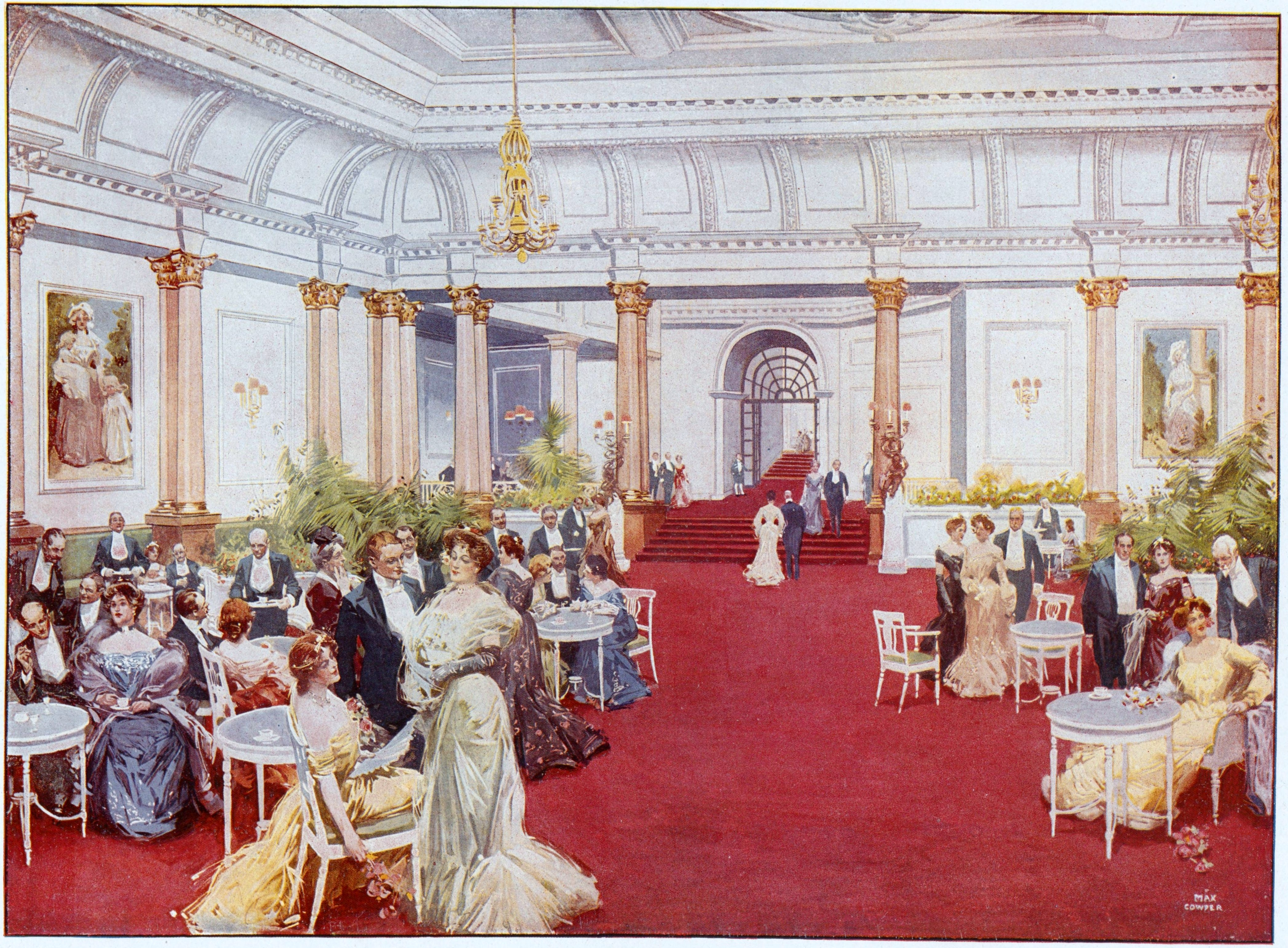
The large restaurant of the Savoy, c. 1900

=== Restaurants ===
The hotel has three restaurants, all managed by Gordon Ramsay: the Savoy Grill, on the north side of the building, with its entrance off the Strand, The River Restaurant (formerly known as Kaspars, and before that the Savoy Restaurant), on the south side, overlooking the River Thames, and Restaurant 1890. The River Restaurant has long been famous for its inventive chefs, beginning in 1890, with the celebrity chef Auguste Escoffier. Escoffier created many famous dishes at the Savoy. In 1893, he invented the pêche Melba in honour of the Australian singer Nellie Melba, and in 1897, Melba toast. Other Escoffier creations were bombe Néro (a flaming ice), fraises à la Sarah Bernhardt (strawberries with pineapple and Curaçao sorbet), baisers de Vierge (meringue with vanilla cream and crystallised white rose and violet petals) and suprêmes de volailles Jeannette (jellied chicken breasts with foie gras). Another signature dish is the omelette Arnold Bennett, created by the chef Jean Baptiste Virlogeux.

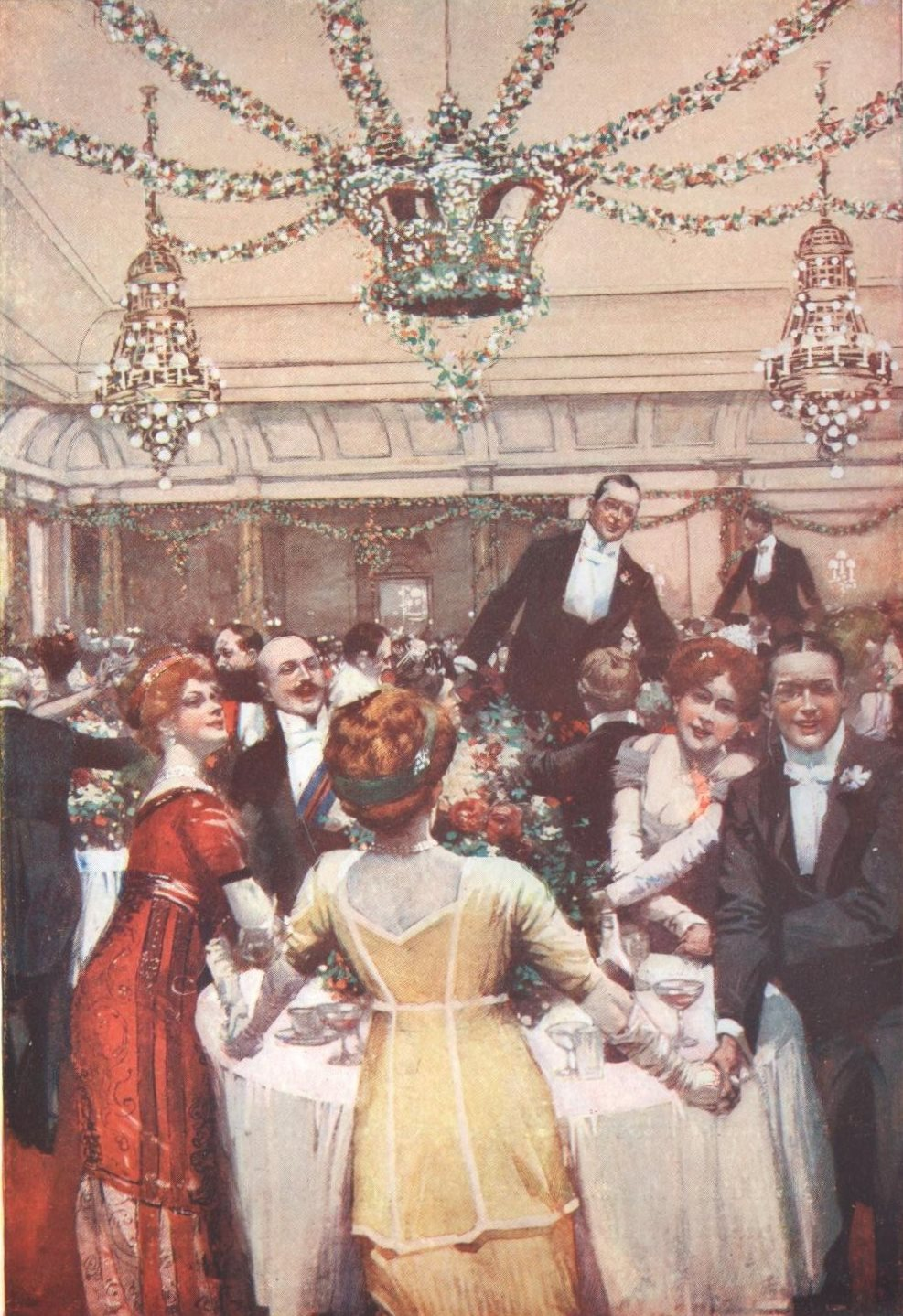
New Year's Eve dinner at the Savoy, 1910

Under Ritz and Escoffier, evening dress was required in the restaurant, and Ritz was innovative in hiring popular musicians to play background music during dinner and in printing daily menus. Even today, elegant dining at the Savoy includes formal afternoon tea with choral and other performances at Christmastime. The Savoy has a Sunday brunch, which includes free-flow champagne, and special events, such as New Year's Eve dinner. August Laplanche was head chef at the hotel from 1946 to 1965, Silvino Trompetto was maître-chef from 1965 to 1980, and Anton Edelmann was maître chef des cuisines for 21 years, from 1982 to 2003.

As part of the 2010 refurbishment, the restaurant was completely redecorated in the Art Deco style, with a leopard print carpet. In 2013, the restaurant became Kaspar's Seafood Bar & Grill. The menu features oysters, cured and smoked fish. The interior design follows the hotel's 1920s style and its black and green livery, and the room offers views of the Thames and some of London's landmarks. The restaurant is open all day, seven days a week. Reviews for the restaurant have improved since the re-opening: "The smoked and cured fish here is to die for, and a whole roast sea bream for two was simply brilliant."

Since Ramsay employed his former protégé Marcus Wareing in the less formal Savoy Grill, the restaurant earned its first Michelin star. The Grill was originally "where people go to eat a modest luncheon or to dine on the way to the theatre without spending too much time or too much money". Since 2010, the chef patron has been Stuart Gillies. From 2015 to 2017, Kim Woodward, a former contestant on the TV show MasterChef: The Professionals, became the Grill's first female head chef. The Thames Foyer serves breakfast, morning coffee, light lunch and supper, as well as afternoon tea, accompanied by the hotel's resident pianist. Also part of the hotel buildings is Simpson's-in-the-Strand, featuring classic British style cuisine. Its specialties are aged Scottish beef on the bone, potted shrimps, roast saddle of lamb and steak and kidney pie.

In February 2022 Ramsay opened Restaurant 1890 in the hotel. In February 2024 it was awarded a Michelin star.

=== Bars ===
The American Bar at the Savoy Hotel was one of the earliest establishments to introduce American-style cocktails to Europe. The term American Bar was used in London to designate the sale of American cocktails from the late 19th century.

The head barmen, in chronological order, have been as follows:

- Frank Wells, 1893 to 1902.

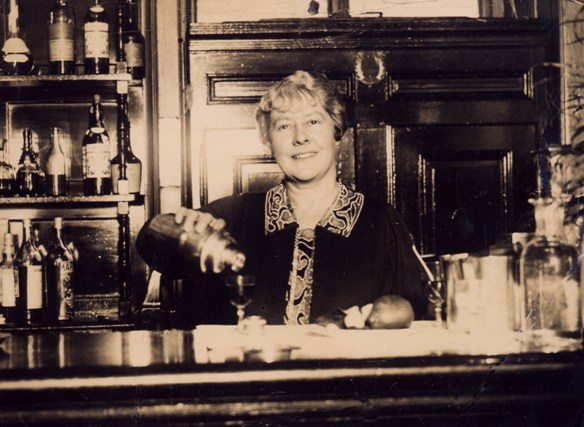
Ada Coleman bartending at the Savoy, c. 1920

- Ada "Coley" Coleman, 1903 to 1924. She concocted the "Hanky-Panky" cocktail for Sir Charles Hawtrey.
- Harry Craddock, 1925 to 1938. Born in England, Craddock trained as a barman in the US but fled 1920s Prohibition to head the Savoy's bars; author of The Savoy Cocktail Book and reputed inventor of such cocktails as the "White Lady".
- Eddie Clark, 1939 to 1942. During the Second World War, he created a cocktail for each branch of the armed services: "Eight Bells" for the Navy, "New Contemptible" for the Army, and "Wings" for the RAF.
- Reginald "Johnnie" Johnson, 1942 to 1954. He invented "Wedding Bells" for the wedding of Princess Elizabeth and Prince Philip.
- Joe Gilmore, 1954 to 1975. Among his many creations was the "Moonwalk" to honour Neil Armstrong's achievement. His hangover cure was two aspirins and a corpse reviver.
- Harry "Vic" Viccars, 1975 to 1981. His cocktails included "Speedbird," one of three drinks created for the first commercial flight of the Concorde in 1976.
- Victor Gower, 1981 to 1985
- Peter Dorelli, 1985 to 2003. His 1889er celebrated the hotel's centenary in 1989, and together with Salim Khoury, he created the "Millennium" to celebrate the end of the 20th century.
- Salim Khoury, 2003 to 2010. In 1992, he won the UK Barman of the Year competition by inventing the "Blushing Monarch", inspired by Princess Diana.
- Erik Lorincz, 2010 to 2018. He created a version of the "El Malecon" cocktail.
- Maxim Schulte, 2018 to 2020.
- Shannon Tebay, 2021 to 2022
- Chelsie Bailey, 2022 to 2024
- Angelo Sparvoli, 2024 to current

The American Bar is decorated in a warm Art Deco design, with cream and ochre walls, and electric blue and gold chairs. The walls feature the photos of famous guests. A pianist plays classic American jazz every day on a baby grand piano in the centre of the room.

The Beaufort Bar is a new bar created in the 2010 renovation, specialising in champagne as well as cocktails. Decorated in an Art Deco design of jet-black and gold, it offers a nightly cabaret.

=== The Savoy Cocktail Book ===
In 1930, the Savoy Hotel first published its cocktail book, The Savoy Cocktail Book, with 750 recipes compiled by Harry Craddock of the American Bar and Art Deco "decorations" by Gilbert Rumbold. The book has remained in print since then and was subsequently republished in 1952, 1965, 1985, 1996, and expanded in 1999 and 2014.

== Savoy Court ==
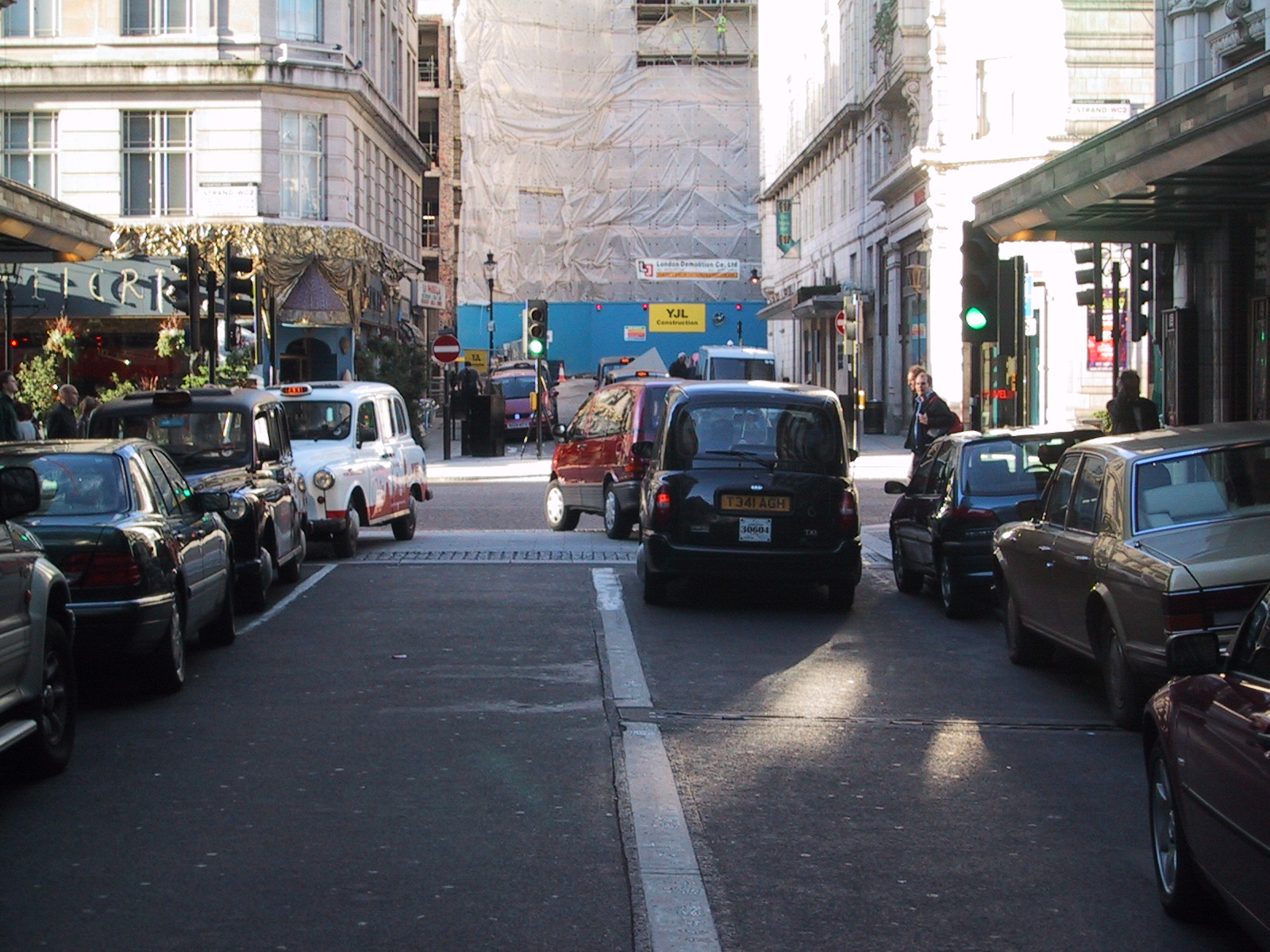
Traffic driving on the right in Savoy Court

In Savoy Court, vehicles are required to drive on the right. This is said to date from the days of the hackney carriage when a cab driver would reach his arm out of the driver's door window to open the passenger's door (which opened backwards and had the handle at the front), without having to get out of the cab himself. Additionally, the hotel entrance's small roundabout meant that vehicles needed a turning circle of 25 feet (7.6 m) to navigate it. This is still the legally required turning circle for all London cabs.

== See also ==
- The Other Club (a dining club) used to dine in the Pinafore Room of the hotel.

== Sources ==
- Ainger, Michael (2002). Gilbert and Sullivan – A Dual Biography. Oxford: Oxford University Press. ISBN 0-19-514769-3.
- Barr, Luke (2018). Ritz and Escoffier: The Hotelier, the Chef, and the Rise of the Leisure Class. New York: Clarkson Potter. ISBN 978-0-8041-8629-2.
- James, Kenneth (2002). Escoffier: The King of Chefs. London and New York: Hambledon and London. ISBN 978-1-85285-396-9.
- Ritz, Marie-Louise (1938). César Ritz, Host to the World. London: Harrap. OCLC 504184890.
- Somerville, Sir Robert (1960). The Savoy: Manor, Hospital, Chapel. London: Duchy of Lancaster. OCLC 877759342.
- Tucker, Paul Hayes (1989). Monet in the 90s: The Series Paintings. Boston: Museum of Fine Arts. ISBN 0-300-04659-6.
