= Ada Coleman =

English bartender (1875–1966)

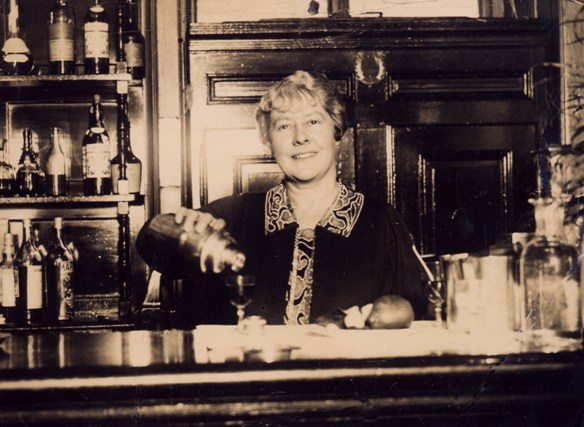
- Ada Coleman bartending at the Savoy, circa 1920
- Born: 1875
- Died: 1966 (aged 91)
- Occupation: Head bartender
- Employer: Savoy Hotel
- Known for: Hanky-Panky cocktail

Ada Coleman (1875–1966) was head bartender at the Savoy Hotel in London for 23 years, the only woman to have held that position. While working at the Savoy, she invented the "hanky panky", a distinctive variation on the sweet martini cocktail.

== Early life ==
Coleman was born in 1875, the daughter of a steward at Rupert D'Oyly Carte's golf club. When she was 24 her father died, and D'Oyly offered her a job at one of his hotels, first in the flower shop and then in the bar at Claridge's hotel.

Around the time that Coleman began working as a bartender, according to a study published in 1905, slightly less than half the bartenders in London were women. "Barmaids", as they were called, were usually the daughters of tradesmen or mechanics or, occasionally, young women from the "better-born" classes who had been "thrown upon their own resources" and needed an income. Though the hours were long, many women saw the job as less monotonous and potentially more lucrative than other jobs that were available to them. Campaigns were underway at that time to eliminate barwork as an occupation for women, because of perceptions that the job was bad for them and for society, physically and morally.

Coleman, at 24, was nearly at the age ceiling for entry level female bartenders, as many bars and pubs specified no one over 25 need apply. In an interview with the London Express, Coleman remembered that the first mixed drink she made was a Manhattan, and that she was coached by Fisher, the hotel's Wine Butler, on how to make it.

== At the Savoy ==
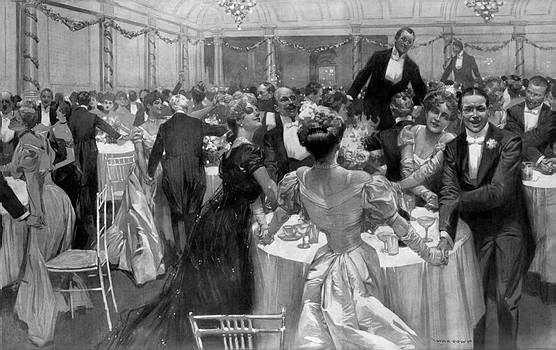
New Year's Eve at the Savoy Hotel 1907

Coleman was promoted to head bartender of the American Bar at the Savoy Hotel in 1903. Though Coleman is sometimes cited as the first and only female head bartender at the Savoy, there was already another woman tending bar, Ruth Burgess, known as "Miss B" or "Kitty", who started in 1902. Newspaper accounts say they were equally popular with customers, but it was Coleman who was interviewed when she retired and who later found her way into 20th and 21st century histories of cocktails and bartending. One account says the two women worked separate shifts for 20 years without speaking to one another because Coleman had refused to give Burgess the recipes for her popular drinks.

American bars, and the diverse cocktails they served, had become popular in England in the late 19th century, and were a selling point for any establishment that had them during Coleman's era. Coleman quickly developed a reputation for being a talented bartender and consummate hostess to the notable and affluent clientele of the Savoy. The Earl of Lonsdale wrote that "she was so nice and so kind and so full of life and energy." Other clients who drank at Coleman's bar included Mark Twain, Marlene Dietrich, Charlie Chaplin, Diamond Jim Brady and the Prince of Wales. "Coley," as her customers nicknamed her, was an "impresario" behind the bar, according to cocktail historian Ted Hughes. "Not only was Coley...a woman in the world of male bartenders," he said, "it was she who made the bar famous."

A lover of musical theatre, she also gave parties at her home which were attended by a diverse crowd of people.

== The hanky panky ==
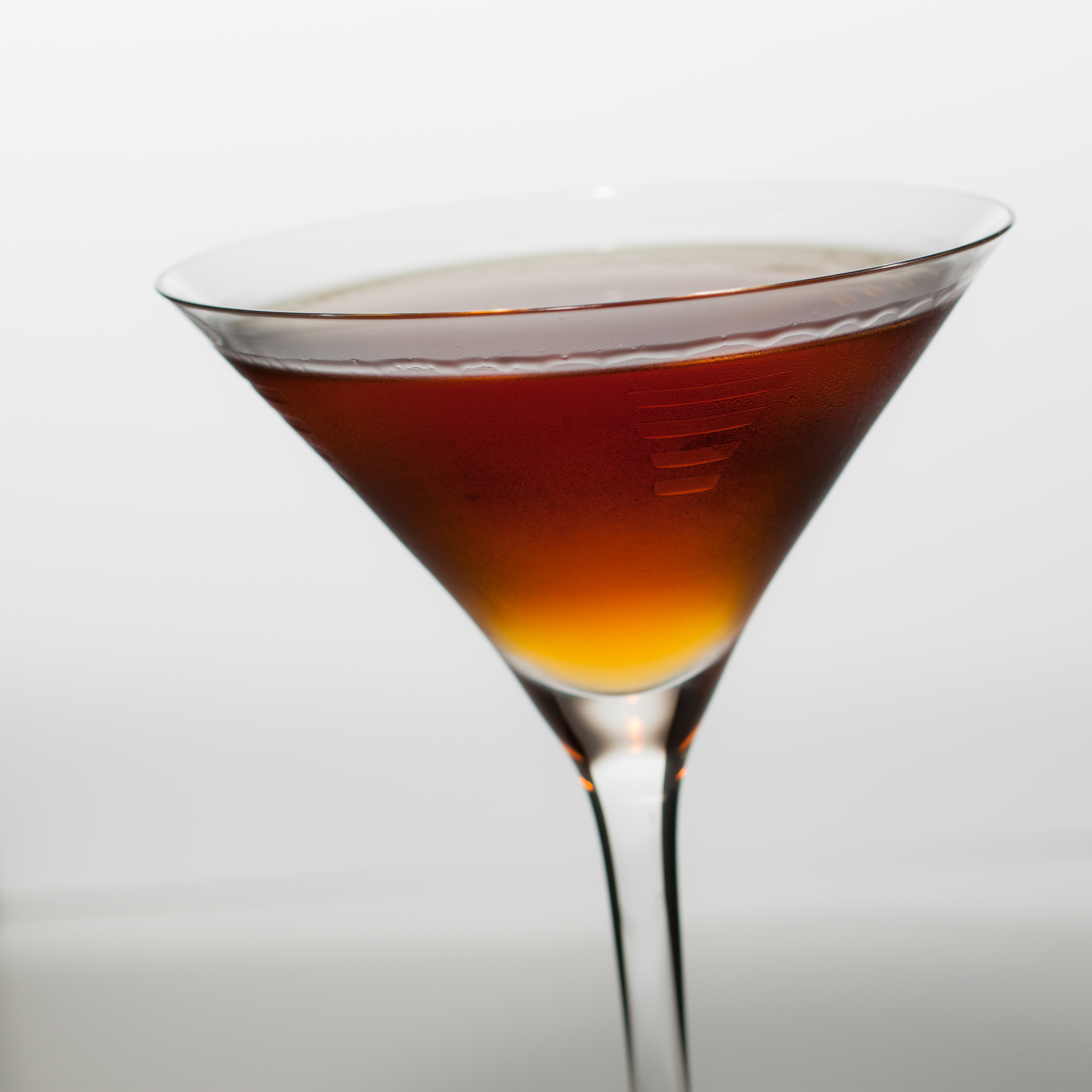
The hanky panky cocktail

Coley was known as a mixologist who enjoyed creating new drinks. Charles Hawtrey, a comedic actor, and, according to Coley, "one of the best judges of cocktails that I knew," used to come into the bar and say, "Coley, I am tired. Give me something with a bit of punch in it." Coleman recalled.

"It was for him that I spent hours experimenting until I had invented a new cocktail," she said. "The next time he came in, I told him I had a new drink for him. He sipped it, and, draining the glass, he said 'By Jove! This is the real hanky-panky!"

The name hanky panky, which in England meant at that time 'magic', or 'witchcraft' stuck with the drink, a combination of gin, vermouth and Fernet Branca, which is still served in the American Bar at the Savoy today, as well as listed in cocktail manuals.

== Retirement ==
In late 1925, the Savoy shut down the American Bar for renovations and announced the retirement of Coleman and Ruth Burgess. They were replaced by the naturalised American Harry Craddock, who had worked the service bar for five years while the women worked the front bar. Craddock later wrote The Savoy Cocktail Book, which included Coleman's recipe for the hanky panky.

In February 1926, five London newspapers published the story of Coley's retirement from bartending. In an interview with The London Daily Express, who called her "England's most famous barmaid" and "The Queen of Cocktail Mixers", Coleman estimated she had served one hundred thousand customers and poured one million drinks.

After Coleman left the bar, some cocktail historians have said she worked in the hotel's flower shop. In 2016, Susan Scott, the archivist at the Savoy said she had found no evidence of that. In Coleman's later life she took a part-time job managing the staff in the ladies' cloakroom at The Berkeley hotel.

== Death and legacy ==
Coleman died in 1966, at the age of 91. In 2016, Liquor.com listed her as one of the nine most important bartenders of all time, and bartenders at the Savoy still spoke of her as an 'iconic legend'. The hanky panky is now served worldwide. In 2015, it was listed by Drinks International as one of the top 50 best-selling cocktails, and is called one of "the unforgettables" by the International Bartenders Association. At the Savoy, it is served in two versions: the original Coleman recipe along with an upgraded version which is aged in oak barrels and includes several different kinds of vermouth and gin. In 2018, a cocktail bar and lounge named Ada's Place opened in the Hudson Yards neighborhood of New York City. The name is a tribute to Coleman.
