= Stuart Gillies =

British chef

Stuart Gillies is an English chef and former CEO of the Gordon Ramsay Group, appointed in 2016 after working as managing director for the group from 2011.

After training in the UK, Gillies spent a year in Rome at the Lord Byron Hotel, and three years in Stockholm, Sweden. He then moved to Daniel's in New York City, working under the direction of Daniel Boulud. On returning to the UK, he worked at Le Caprice in London. He joined Angela Hartnett as head chef at The Connaught, before opening the Gordon Ramsay-owned Boxwood Café in May 2003. He was chef director at the reopened Savoy Hotel from October 2010, and at Plane Food.

Gillies has appeared on television on GMTV, and as a guest on BBC1’s Saturday Kitchen. He was chosen to compete in the second series of the Great British Menu in Spring 2007, losing in the south-east England heat to Atul Kochhar. He lives in Chislehurst with his wife and four sons, where has recently opened The Bank House restaurant.
