= Hilary Wontner =

English actor (1912–1984)

- Born: 3 October 1912; Brentford, Middlesex, England
- Died: 25 June 1984 (aged 71); Seaford, East Sussex, England
- Occupation: Television actor
- Parent: Arthur Wontner
- Relatives: Hugh Wontner (brother)

Hilary Wontner (3 October 1912 – 25 June 1984) was an English television actor. He appeared in many British and American television series and films, which include Crossroads, No Hiding Place, The Avengers, Randall and Hopkirk (Deceased), All Creatures Great and Small, We'll Meet Again and others.

== Biography ==
Wontner was born in Brentford, the son of actor Arthur Wontner and actress Rose Pendennis, and the brother of politician and hotelier Hugh Wontner. He appeared in George Bernard Shaw's Saint Joan and other plays at the Malvern Drama Festival in 1936. "Mr. Wontner imparts as much naturaless as can be into his asides, and strenuously keeps the action going by his own inaction," a newspaper reviewer wrote in 1936, of his performance in The Clandestine Marriage, also at the Malvern festival. He played Hare in James Bridie's The Anatomist in 1937, and in Trumpeter, Play! on the London stage in 1938. Later in life he was in Ben Travers' farce Thark, in Coventry. He had a long career playing character roles in film and television.

Wontner died in 1984, at age 71, in Seaford.

== Screen credits ==
Production	Yeat	Role	Notes
The Wandering Jew	1947	Godfrey, Duke of Normandy	Film
The Naked Edge	1961	1st Customer in Clay's Bookshop	Film, Uncredited
Decision at Midnight	1963	Forbes	Film
A Comedy Tale of Fanny Hill	1964		Short film
Dr. Kildare	1964	Lionel Grant	"A Hundred Million Tomorrows"
The Bill Dana Show	1964	Hilary Winkley / Mr. Bardley	"A Tip for Uncle Sam" / "Master of Disguise"
The Rogues	1964	Mr. Beamer	"The Day They Gave Diamonds Away"
Crossroads	1964	Sir Geoffrey Yuillw	1 episode
Orlando	1965		"Load of Bilge Water"
A World of Comedy	1965	C.I.G.S.	"The Enormous Ear"
Sherlock Holmes in the Singular Case of the Plural Green Mustache	1965	Narrator	Short film
No Hiding Place	1965-1966	Mr. Pollock / Parfitt	"The Hunted and the Hunters" / "The Fit-Up"
The Trygon Factor	1966	Man at Hotel	Film, Uncredited
The Avengers	1965-1967	Minister / Dumayn	"Silent Dust" / "The Winged Avenger"
Randall and Hopkirk (Deceased)	1970	1st Man in Steamroom	"The Ghost Talks"
Scoop	1972	Sir Algernon	2 episodes
Murder Must Advertise	1973	Mountjoy	2 episodes
The Pallisers	1974	Member of Parliament	"Part Twenty-three"
Days of Hope	1975	Lord Reading	"1926: General Strike"
Shades of Greene	1976	Henry MacDougall	"The Case for the Defence"
Two's Company	1979	3rd Member	"The Club"
Suez 1956	1979	Marquess of Salisbury	TV movie
All Creatures Great and Small	1980	Major Headingley	"Be Prepared"
BBC2 Playhouse	1980	Colonel	"Fatal Spring"
We'll Meet Again	1982	Sir Arthur Maylie	"One Step Forward, Two Steps Back", (final television appearance)
