= Hanky panky (cocktail) =

Cocktail from UK

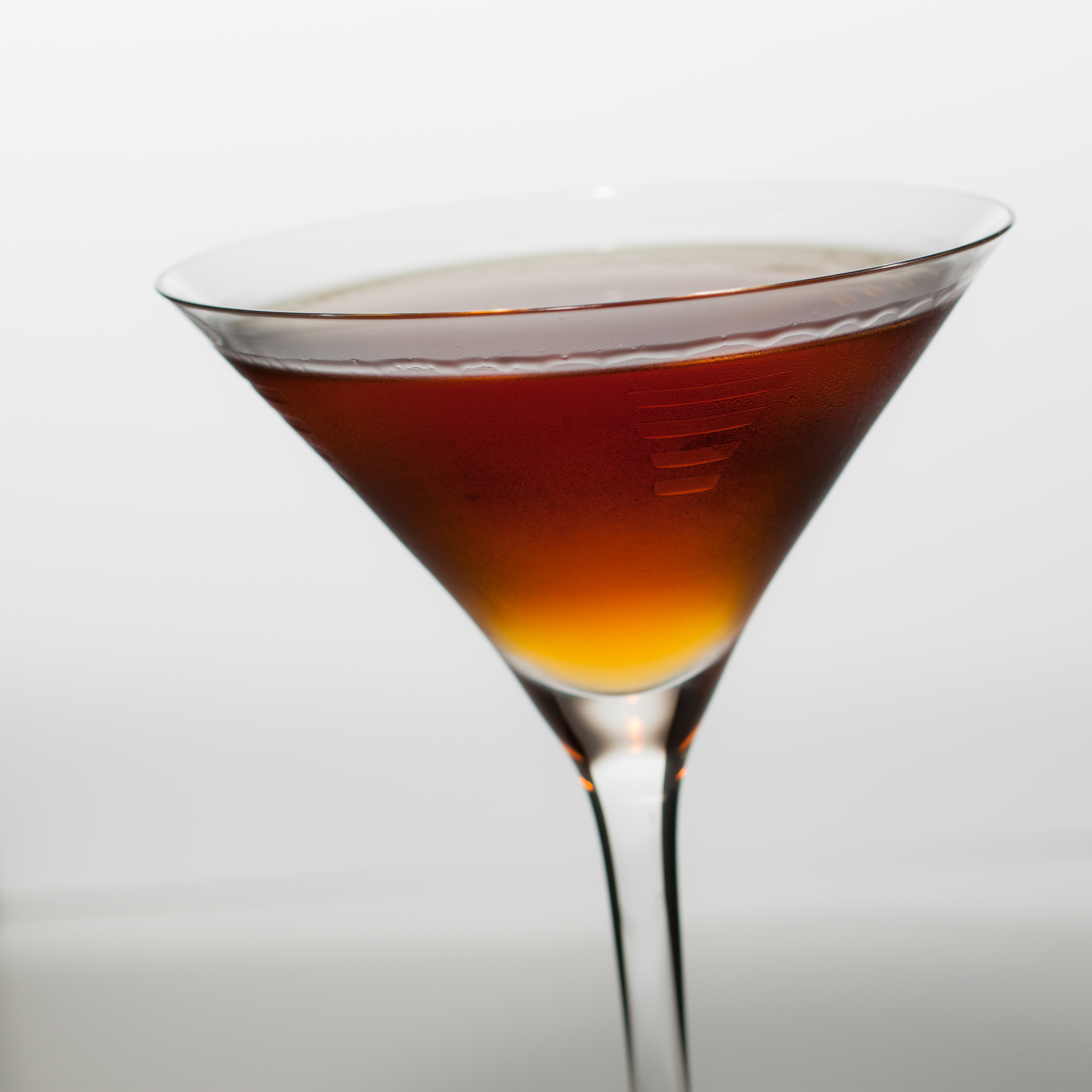
- Type: Mixed drink
- Ingredients: 45 ml London dry gin; 45 ml Sweet red vermouth; 7.5 ml Fernet-Branca
- Base spirit: Gin, Vermouth
- Standard drinkware: Cocktail glass
- Standard garnish: Orange zest
- Served: Straight up: chilled, without ice
- Preparation: Stirred over ice, strained into a chilled glass, garnished, and served up.

The hanky panky is a cocktail made from gin, sweet vermouth, and Fernet-Branca. It is a variation on the sweet martini, or Martinez, made distinctive by the Fernet-Branca, a bitter Italian digestivo. It was created by Ada "Coley" Coleman, head bartender at the Savoy Hotel, London.

== Recipe ==
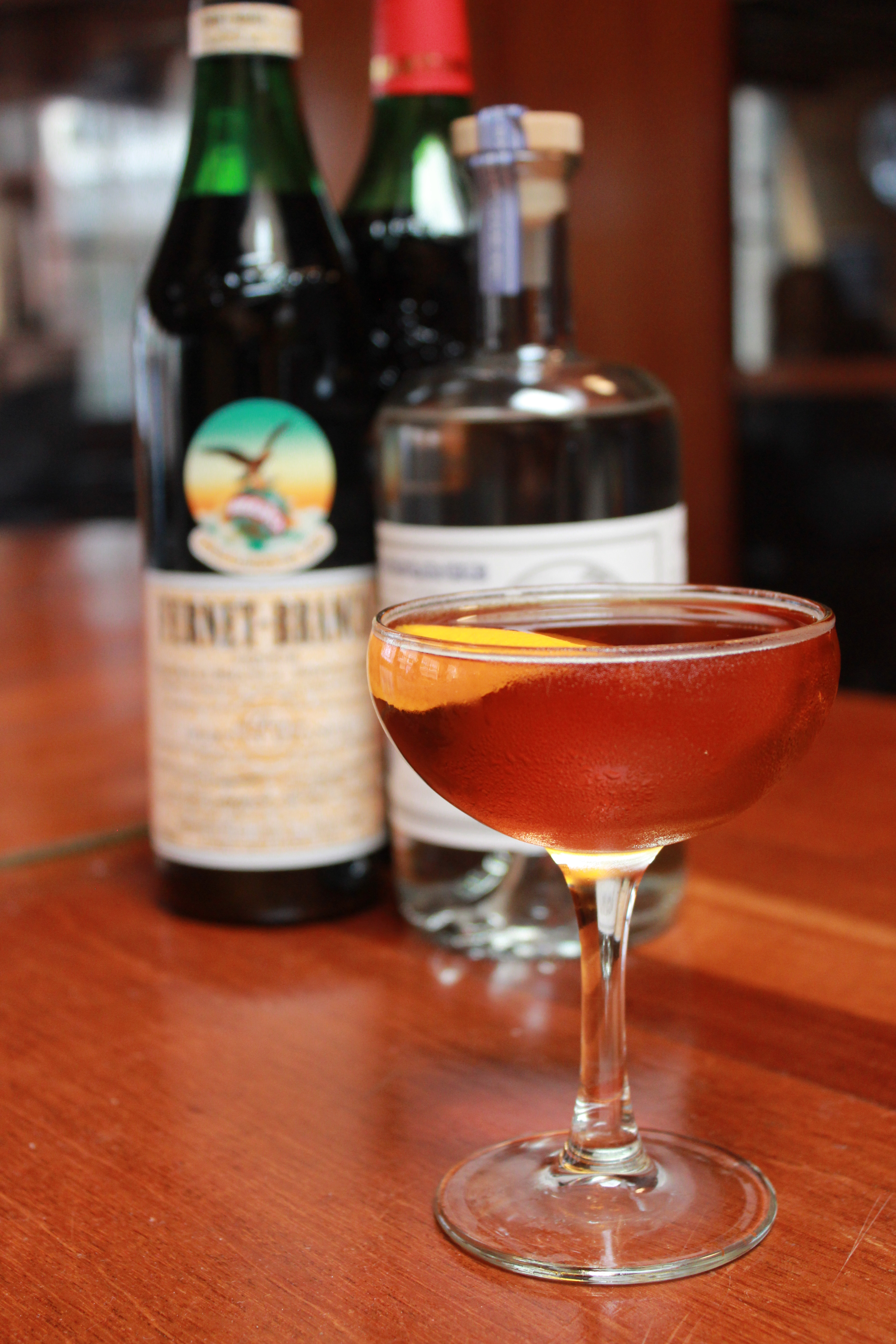
A hanky panky with ingredients

A recipe for the cocktail was included in Harry Craddock's The Savoy Cocktail Book.

In a cocktail shaker over ice pour:

- 1/2 (1 1/2 oz) Italian vermouth
- 1/2 (1 1/2 oz) dry gin
- 2 dashes Fernet-Branca

Stir
Strain into a (4 oz.) cocktail glass.
Garnish by squeezing an orange peel over the top.

== History ==
The hanky panky was the brainchild of Ada Coleman (known as "Coley") who began as a bartender at the Savoy Hotel in 1903. Her benefactor was Rupert D'Oyly Carte, a member of the family that first produced Gilbert and Sullivan operas in London and that built the Savoy Hotel. When Rupert became chairman of the Savoy, Ada was given a position at the hotel's American Bar, where she eventually became the head bartender and made cocktails for the likes of Mark Twain, the Prince of Wales, Prince Wilhelm of Sweden, and Sir Charles Hawtrey.

Coleman created the hanky panky for Hawtrey. He was a Victorian and Edwardian actor who mentored Noël Coward. Coleman told the story behind the creation of the hanky panky to England's The People newspaper in 1925:

The late Charles Hawtrey ... was one of the best judges of cocktails that I knew. Some years ago, when he was overworking, he used to come into the bar and say, "Coley, I am tired. Give me something with a bit of punch in it." It was for him that I spent hours experimenting until I had invented a new cocktail. The next time he came in, I told him I had a new drink for him. He sipped it, and, draining the glass, he said, "By Jove! That is the real hanky-panky!", And Hanky-Panky it has been called ever since.

The hanky panky is a variation on the sweet martini, inasmuch as it calls for gin and sweet vermouth, but Coley's secret ingredient that made the drink distinctive was Fernet-Branca, a bitter Italian digestivo.

== See also ==
- List of cocktails
