= George Reeves-Smith =

English hotel manager (1863–1941)

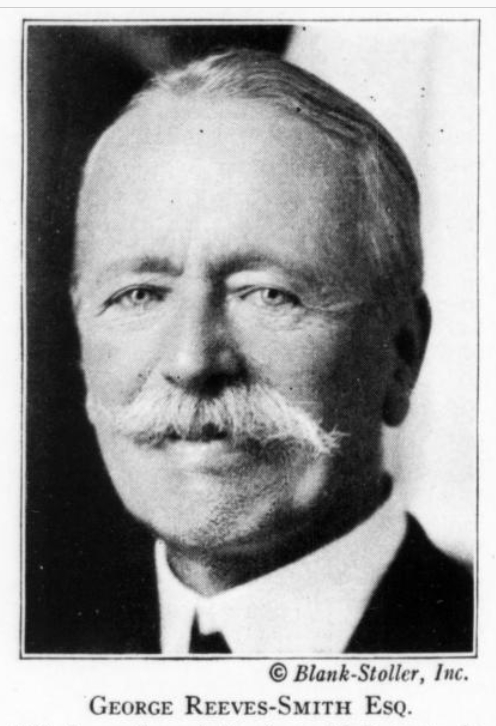
Reeves-Smith in 1929

Sir George Reeves-Smith (17 July 1863 – 29 May 1941) was an English hotelier. Hired by Richard D'Oyly Carte in 1900 to replace César Ritz as manager of the Savoy Hotel, he remained in the post until his death four decades later. In addition to running the Savoy, he was general manager of the other hotels and restaurants in the Savoy group and was a director of the Savoy Theatre. He was also instrumental in establishing charitable medical institutions in England and Switzerland.

== Early years ==
Reeves-Smith was born in Scarborough, Yorkshire, the son of George Reeves-Smith, whose jobs included running the Brighton aquarium. He was educated at Brighton College and then apprenticed to J. Calvet et cie, Bordeaux wine négociants, after which he trained in the hotel industry. By 1893 he was manager of the Berkeley Hotel, Piccadilly, and four years later he led a management buy-out, with himself as principal shareholder and managing director.

At the same time, Richard D'Oyly Carte, founder of the Savoy Hotel, dismissed his manager, César Ritz, for financial irregularities, and was looking for a suitable replacement. Carte was impressed by both Reeves-Smith and the Berkeley, and he effectively secured both by purchasing the Berkeley and making Reeves-Smith managing director of the Savoy hotel group. Reeves-Smith held this office from 1900 for the rest of his life, and from 1916 took on the post of vice-chairman of the company, which he also held for life. In 1904, in addition to managing the growing Savoy hotel group, which included, among other interests, the Savoy, the Berkeley, Claridge's and Simpson's-in-the-Strand, he became a director of the Savoy Theatre.

== Savoy group ==
The Oxford Dictionary of National Biography said of Reeves-Smith that "he was aware of the slightest derogation from high standards of housekeeping or service; yet he was innovative and capable of masterly delegation ... punctilious and conservative in manner and dress, he had a shrewd business appreciation of practical detail and people's tastes in leisure activities." In 1930, the novelist Arnold Bennett, who knew the Savoy well, dedicated his Imperial Palace to Reeves-Smith. The principal character of the novel, Evelyn Orcham, is the resourceful and urbane general manager of a large hôtel de luxe in London.

Reeves-Smith founded the Hotels and Restaurants Association (1910) and was its dominant figure for the rest of his life. He was connected with other catering industry organisations, including the International Hotel Alliance, of which he was president. His interests extended beyond the world of grand hotels: he was instrumental in founding in the Preston Hall centre for tuberculous ex-servicemen in Kent, and the British Sanatorium in Montana-Vermala, Switzerland. He was knighted in 1938 for service to the hotel industry, and was honoured by France (Légion d'honneur, 1938) and Italy (Knight Commander of the Order of the Crown of Italy, 1939). In 1938 Reeves-Smith engaged as his assistant Hugh Wontner, who took over when Reeves-Smith died.

== Personal life ==
In 1888 Reeves-Smith married Maud Hindle, daughter of a Brighton hotelier. They had one son, who was killed in World War I, and one daughter. Their home was always a suite in one of Reeves-Smith's hotels, first in the Berkeley, then at Claridge's, where Reeves-Smith died of pneumonia, aged 77, survived by his wife.

== See also ==
- Helen Carte
- Rupert D'Oyly Carte
- Gilbert and Sullivan
