= Nick DiGiovanni =

American chef and social media personality (born 1996)

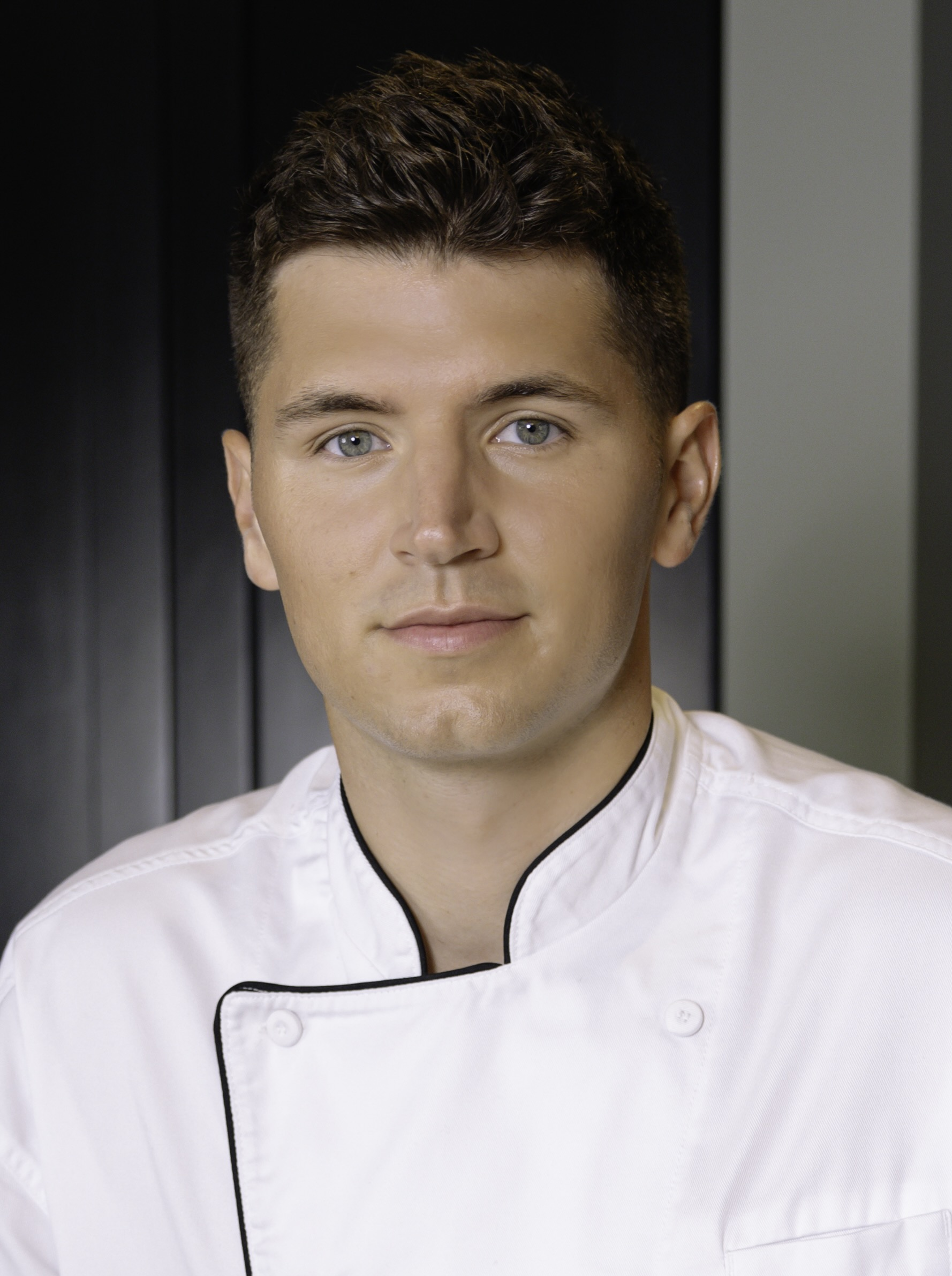
- DiGiovanni in 2024
- Born: Nicholas Channing DiGiovanni; May 19, 1996 (age 30); Providence, Rhode Island, U.S.
- Education: Harvard University (AB)
- Occupations: Chef; internet personality
- Height: 191 cm (6 ft 3 in)

Instagram information
- Page: nick.digiovanni
- Followers: 4.4 million

TikTok information
- Page: nick.digiovanni
- Followers: 13.7 million

YouTube information
- Channel: Nick DiGiovanni; Nick's Kitchen
- Years active: 2019–present
- Subscribers: 44.6 million
- Views: 22.6 billion
- Last updated: August 8, 2026
- Website: osmokitchen.com

Nicholas Channing DiGiovanni (born May 19, 1996) is an American chef and social media personality. He gained recognition after finishing third on the tenth season of MasterChef in 2019 and later built a large following by posting cooking videos online. He has also set several food-related Guinness World Records.

DiGiovanni founded the pantry brand Osmo in 2021 and published the cookbook Knife Drop: Creative Recipes Anyone Can Cook in 2023. He has won Streamy and Webby Awards and was included in Time magazine's TIME100 Creators list in 2025. In 2026, he signed a licensing agreement with Netflix to distribute his YouTube catalogue and develop an exclusive food video podcast.

== Early life and education ==
Nick DiGiovanni was born on May 19, 1996, in Providence, Rhode Island, to Christopher DiGiovanni, an orthopaedic surgeon, and Susan "Sudie" (née Naimi), a teacher, both graduates of Dartmouth College. He is of Italian, Persian, German, and British descent. He has three younger brothers.

DiGiovanni's maternal grandfather, Shapur Naimi, was born in Iran, and is often referenced in his videos on Persian food. He became interested in cooking at a young age by watching his grandmother and great-grandmother cook for the family.

After graduating from Milton Academy in 2015, DiGiovanni attended Harvard University. While at Harvard, he lived in Quincy House. He graduated from Harvard in 2019 with a self-designed concentration in food and climate.

== Career ==
=== MasterChef US ===
During his senior year of college, DiGiovanni attended a casting call for season 10 of MasterChef. He was selected to compete on the show and finished in third place overall. To film the show, DiGiovanni reportedly left in the middle of the semester at Harvard without informing his professors. He returned the next season as a mentor for finalists. After completing MasterChef and graduating from Harvard, DiGiovanni began to post cooking videos on YouTube.

In 2024, he returned as a guest judge and mentor on the fourteenth season of MasterChef. He also appeared as a special guest in episode 12 ("Global Feed") of MasterChef season 16 which aired on August 5, 2026.

=== Guinness records ===
In November 2021, DiGiovanni, alongside Lynn “Lynja” Yamada Davis, broke the Guinness World Record for the largest-ever cake pop, which weighed 97 pounds 8.52 ounces (44.240 kg). In June 2022, they broke another Guinness World Record for the largest chicken nugget ever made, weighing 20.96 kg (46.2 lb). In August, he visited the most fast food restaurants in 24 hours (69 restaurants). In October, he beat Gordon Ramsay's record for the fastest time to fillet a 10-pound (4.5 kg) fish by five seconds; completing it in exactly one minute. On the same day, he constructed the world's largest sushi roll, which measured 2.15 meters (7 ft 1 in) in diameter. In November, he and Nigel Ng created the largest fortune cookie at 1.47 kg (3.2 lb) and made the largest donation of turkey in 24 hours (64,463.44 kg (142,117.6 lb) - roughly equivalent to 7,620 turkeys). On May 11, 2023, DiGiovanni and Ramsay broke the Guinness World Record for the largest Beef Wellington, which weighed 25.76 kg (56.8 lb), in partnership with celebrity chefs and YouTubers Max the Meat Guy, Gustavo Tosta, and Ahmad Alzahabi. This was his ninth Guinness World Record.

=== Endorsement deals and other ventures ===
In 2021, DiGiovanni founded Osmo the direct-to-consumer pantry brand that primarily sells seasonings, and sauces. The company also manufactures electric salt and pepper grinders. Osmo has collaborated with various brands such as Four Roses (January 2023), Chamberlain Coffee (March 2023), and Carbone Fine Food (November 2024). In 2023, he authored a cookbook entitled Knife Drop: Creative Recipes Anyone Can Cook, featuring a foreword by Ramsay.

In November 2024, DiGiovanni had a voice cameo in Zootopia 2 as bartender Slick Di'Giguani. In July 2025, he became an official brand partner of Feastables, a chocolate brand created by MrBeast.

In July 2026, DiGiovanni signed a licensing agreement with Netflix for the distribution of his entire YouTube video catalog, "day-and-date" releases of new content from his channels, and the development of an upcoming exclusive food video podcast. He is represented by United Talent Agency and Yorn Levine Barnes Krintzman Rubenstein Kohner Endlich Goodell & Gellman.

== Personal life ==
DiGiovanni is in a relationship with Isabelle Tashima. He lives in Boston, Massachusetts.

=== Philanthropy ===
In 2021, DiGiovanni participated in the #TeamSeas campaign founded by YouTuber MrBeast, which raised $30 million to clean up 30 million pounds (14 million kilograms) of trash in the ocean.

DiGiovanni is an ambassador of The Farmlink Project, a non-profit that provides meals for families in need. A portion of proceeds from his clothing company Happy Potato are donated to Farmlink. In 2022, he partnered with Chipotle to help Farmlink donate 20,000,000 pounds (9,100,000 kg) of fresh produce to food banks.

== Awards and nominations ==
In 2021, DiGiovanni was included in the Forbes 30 Under 30 list in the Food and Drink category. The same year, DiGiovanni won YouTube's Streamy Award for Food. He was a Webby Award recipient in 2022, 2025, and 2026. From 2023 to 2026, DiGiovanni was included in Forbes’ Top Creators list that recognises 50 most powerful YouTube, Instagram, and TikTok influencers.

In July 2025, DiGiovanni was featured in Time magazine's TIME100 Creators list under the “Titans” category for his culinary-focused YouTube and TikTok content.

Year	Award	Category	Result	Ref.
2021	Streamy Awards	Food	Won	
2022	Streamy Awards	Food	Nominated	
2023	Streamy Awards	Food	Won	

== Filmography ==
=== Television ===
Year	Title	Role	Ref.
2019	MasterChef	Contestant (Placed 3rd)	
2021	MasterChef	Mentor	
2021	The Drew Barrymore Show	Self	
2022	Live with Kelly and Mark	Self	
2022	Selena + Chef	Self	
2024	MasterChef	Guest Judge	
2026	100 Cooks (TV)	Judge	

=== Film ===
Year	Title	Role	Notes	Ref.
2025	Zootopia 2	Bartender Slick Di’Giguani	Voice Cameo	

== Bibliography ==
Year	Title	Publisher	Ref.
2023	Knife Drop: Creative Recipes Anyone Can Cook ISBN 978-0744076776	DK/PRH (New York)	
