= Gordon Ramsay's Ultimate Cookery Course =

- Genre: Cooking instruction
- Directed by: Paul Ratcliffe
- Presented by: Gordon Ramsay
- Country of origin: United Kingdom
- Original language: English
- No. of series: 1
- No. of episodes: 20

Production
- Executive producers: Gordon Ramsay; Pat Llewellyn; Ben Adler; Sue Murphy
- Producer: Paul Ratcliffe
- Production companies: One Potato, Two Potato

Original release
- Network: Channel 4
- Release: 10 September – 5 October 2012

Related
- Gordon Ramsay: Cookalong Live

Gordon Ramsay's Ultimate Cookery Course is a British cookery television series that aired from 10 September to 5 October 2012, on Channel 4. It is presented by celebrity chef Gordon Ramsay.

== Description ==
The show's concept is to demonstrate skills to the viewer to improve their skills as home cooks. The meals demonstrated by chef Gordon Ramsay are meant to represent a hundred core recipes. The first series of 20 episodes airs at 5 pm on Channel 4 in the UK. Along with Hugh's 3 Good Things (hosted by Hugh Fearnley-Whittingstall), and Jamie's 15-Minute Meals, Gordon Ramsay's Ultimate Cookery Course was one of three new daytime cookery shows announced by the channel. Joanna Plumb from Cherwood Nurseries in Chawston appeared to explain about chillis. Ramsay has released a cookbook to coincide with the series, published by Hodder & Stoughton in the UK.

== Reception ==
Mike Ward of The Daily Star chose the show as his pick of the day on the day the first episode aired, and stated that the lack of swearing "freaks" him out. It was also selected by Jane Simon of The Daily Mirror, saying that it was a return to cooking basics for Ramsay following his previous television show for Channel 4, Gordon Behind Bars. Cathy Spencer of The Shropshire Star enjoyed the first episode, saying "It was all simple, healthy exciting ingredients – and without an F-word in sight I think Gordon Ramsay will be winning himself a new legion of fans."

The first episode was watched by 1 million viewers, fewer than the 1.1 million watching BBC Two's Put Your Money Where Your Mouth Is.

== Episodes ==
No.	Title	Original airdate
1	"Getting Started"	10 September 2012
Recipes: 1. Pork chops with peppers 2. Pan-fried scallops with crunchy apple salad 3. Chicken & chicory in marsala sauce 4. Sea bream with tomato & herb salsa 5. Stuffed roast chicken		Cooking tips: 1. keeping knives sharp 2. stop chopping board rocking 3. using vegetable peeler 4. using pepper mill 5. peeling garlic
Guide: birds (turkey, game bird, wood pigeon, red-legged partridge, label anglais chicken, black leg chicken, poulet de bresse)
2	"Keeping It Simple"	11 September 2012
Recipes: 6. Chilli beef lettuce wraps 7. Easy fragrant fried rice 8. Garlic & saffron mayonnaise 9. Mussels with celery & chilli 10. Miso salmon		Cooking tips: 6. chopping onion 7. pan temperature 8. tidy cooking area 9. adding salt to egg 10. putting meat in room temperature before cooking
Cooking equipments: knives (chopping, paring, serrated edge) Guide: fish (barramundi, salmon, cod, mackerel, sprat, flatfish)
3	"Cooking with Chilli"	12 September 2012
Recipes: 11. Red mullet with sweet chilli sauce 12. Pasta with tomatoes, anchovy & chillies 13. Grilled corn with chipotle chilli butter 14. Jerk chicken 15. Spicy beef salad		Cooking tips: 11. seeding chillies 12. using spare chillies 13. adding chilli to chocolate & fresh fruit 14. getting rid of chilli from finger 15. spicing up beer & cocktail
Guide: chillies (poblano, jalapeño, bird's eye, habanero)
4	"Cooking with Spice"	13 September 2012
Recipes: 16. Slow cooked fiery lamb 17. Chilli & spice whitebait 18. Roasted squash hummus 19. Curry spiced sweetcorn soup 20. Fragrant spiced rice pudding		Cooking tips: 16. zesting a lemon 17. finely chopping garlic 18. peeling a ginger 19. leftover vanilla pods 20. leftover spices
Cooking equipments: pestle & mortar Guide: spices (cinnamon, sumac, turmeric, Hungarian paprika, black pepper, cardamom, coriander, cumin, nutmeg, saffron)
5	"Ultimate Food on a Budget"	14 September 2012
Recipes: 21. Lamb with fried bread 22. Roasted mackerel with garlic & paprika 23. Pork & prawn balls in aromatic broth 24. Easy arancini 25. Spicy sausage rice		Cooking tips: 21. cooking rice 22. leftover rice for stir fry 23. stopping potatoes, apples & avocadoes from turning brown 24. keeping herbs fresh 25. infusing oil with herbs
Guide: ham, salami, sausages (prosciutto, bresaola, felino, chorizo, merguez, italian fennel, jamaican jerk)
6	"More Ultimate Food on a Budget"	17 September 2012
Recipes: 26. Home made gnocchi 27. Spicy black beans with feta & avocado 28. Leek & Gruyère rösti with fried eggs 29. Chickpea, cumin & spinach koftas with tahini dressing 30. Apple crumble		Cooking tips: 26. cooking pasta 27. making breadcrumbs from leftover bread 28. cooking chickpeas & lentils 29. boiling potatoes 30. leftover potatoes
Cooking equipments: saucepans Guide: potatoes (Jersey Royal, Charlotte, King Edward, Désirée, heritage, salad blue)
7	"Stress-Free Cooking"	18 September 2012
Recipes: 31. Sticky pork ribs 32. Moroccan lamb with sweet potato & raisins 33. Chilli chicken with ginger & coriander 34. Sweet pepper sauce with grilled prawns 35. Spicy chutney		Cooking tips: 31. skinning & deboning a salmon 32. making fish stock 33. steaming vegetables 34. crispy roast potatoes 35. browning meat & fish
Guide: pork (leg, loin, belly, shoulder, trotters, cheek, bacon, leg joint, tenderloin)
8	"Making It Easy"	19 September 2012
Recipes: 36. Meatballs in fragrant coconut broth 37. Beef meatballs with orecchiette, kale & pine nuts 38. Beef meatball sandwich with melting mozzarella & tomato salsa 39. Fiery meatball soup 40. Blondie		Cooking tips: 36. slicing tuna carpaccio 37. leftover wine 38. freezing soups & stews 39. homemade ice cream 40. leftover lemons & limes
Cooking equipments: whisk, spoon, spatula Guide: oils (sunflower, peanut, sesame, rapeseed, walnut, olive)
9	"Real Fast Food"	20 September 2012
Recipes: 41. Chicken stir fry with rice noodles 42. Noodle soup with poached eggs & spring onions 43. Stir-fried pork noodles 44. Noodles with chilli, ginger & lemongrass 45. Smokey pork sliders with BBQ sauce		Cooking tips: 41. jointing a chicken 42. preventing skewers from burning 43. no-fuss marinating 44. lime & lemon juice for marinade 45. lemon juice for cooking rice
Guide: vinegar (malt, red wine, white wine, sherry, cider, rice, balsamic)
10	"Street Food Classics"	21 September 2012
Recipes: 46. Beef tacos with wasabi mayo 47. Spiced chicken wrap 48. Chilli dogs 49. Vietnamese style baguette with beef 50. Malt chocolate doughnuts		Cooking tips: 46. cooking steak rare/medium/well done 47. scoring meat & fish 48. stain-free tupperware 49. making chilli sherry 50. planting chilli peppers
Cooking equipments: frying pan Guide: chocolate (white chocolate, milk chocolate, dark chocolate, 100% cocoa)
11	"Baking"	24 September 2012
Recipes: 51. Olive tomato & rosemary focaccia 52. Simple soda bread 53. Quick flatbreads with lemon thyme & ricotta 54. Mozzarella & rosemary pizza 55. Sponge with fresh ginger		Cooking tips: 51. whipping cream 52. room-temperature cream for whipping 53. preventing milk & cream from boiling over 54. measuring treacle & golden syrup 55. greasing cake tins
Guide: flour (strong flour, double 00, rye flour, self-raising flour)
12	"Better Baking"	25 September 2012
Recipes: 56. Leek & pancetta quiche 57. Indulgent chocolate tarts 58. Beef empanadas 59. Easy chicken pastilla 60. Baked cheesecake		Cooking tips: 56. rolling pastry 57. neat edge on tarts & quiches 58. testing pastry doneness 59. blind-baking without baking beans 60. folding egg white in
Cooking equipments: scales & sieve Guide: milk & cream (single cream, double cream, soured cream, clotted cream, mascarpone)
13	"Ultimate Slow Cooking"	26 September 2012
Recipes: 61. Slow cooked beef short ribs 62. Pork neck curry with mango salsa 63. Sichuan chicken thighs 64. Simple beef brisket 65. Caramelised figs with ricotta		Cooking tips: 61. slow cooking duck breasts 62. getting rid of excess fat from stews & casseroles 63. browning & deglazing meat 64. adding soft herbs 65. frying fish
Guide: mushrooms (morels, trompette de la mort, chanterelle, oyster mushrooms, enoki, truffles)
14	"Slow Cooked Favourites"	27 September 2012
Recipes: 66. Slow braised stuffed lamb breast 67. Easy bollito misto 68. Slow-cooked aubergine 69. Perfect slow-cooked beef 70. Slow roasted pork belly with fennel		Cooking tips: 66. making chicken stock 67. seasoning meat & flour 68. browning meat 69. slow roasting meat 70. removing baked-on residue from pans
Cooking equipments: casserole dish Guide: meat (beef ribs, oxtail, lamb's breast, shin of beef, ox cheeks, pork leg, feather blades)
15	"Brunches"	28 September 2012
Recipes: 71. Frittata; 72. North African eggs 73. Cheat's soufflé with 3 cheeses 74. Prawns & feta omelette 75. Spicy pancakes		Cooking tips: 71. chopping red bell peppers 72. testing freshness of eggs 73. fishing out egg shell 74. frying eggs 75. toasting bagels
Guide: eggs (chicken egg, bantam egg, duck egg, goose egg, quail egg, rhea egg, pheasant egg)
16	"More Brunches"	1 October 2012
Recipes: 76. Steak sandwiches 77. Blueberry & ricotta pancakes with yoghurt & honey 78. Crab & mascarpone crêpes 79. Coconut pancakes with mango & lime syrup 80. Home made crumpet		Cooking tips: 76. peeling & cutting mango 77. checking pineapple ripeness 78. peeling kiwi 79. ripening fruits 80. making fruit purée
Cooking equipments: chopping boards Guide: beef & steaks (fillet, rump, hanger steak, sirloin, rib eye, T-bone)
17	"TV Dinners"	2 October 2012
Recipes: 81. Mushroom & leek pasta 82. Farfalle with ricotta, pancetta & peas 83. Tagliatelle with quick sausage meat bolognaise 84. Spaghetti with chilli, sardines & oregano 85. Sweet corn fritters & yoghurt dip		Cooking tips: 81. cooking chicken breasts 82. parmesan rinds for soup 83. whisking cold butter before serving soup 84. crispy skinned baked potato 85. peeling pan-roasted nuts
Guide: pasta (farfalline, penne, spaghetti, fettuccine, pasta sheets, spaghetti with squid ink)
18	"Simple Suppers"	3 October 2012
Recipes: 86. Spicy tuna fishcakes 87. Flatbreads with fennel & feta 88. Bruschetta with garlic, tomatoes, capers & pecorino 89. Cannellini bean crostini with anchovy & olive 90. Griddled pineapple with spiced caramel		Cooking tips: 86. chopping herbs 87. leftover herbs 88. preparing asparagus 89. soft-boiling eggs 90. making salad dressings
Cooking equipments: peeler & grater Guide: herbs (basil, parsley, coriander, tarragon, chervil, rosemary, thyme, oregano, sage, bay)
19	"Cooking for Special Occasions"	4 October 2012
Recipes: 91. Stuffed lamb with spinach & pine nuts 92. Chicken with garlic & chestnut stuffing 93. Sea bass with fennel, lemon & capers 94. Pork stuffed with manchego & membrillo 95. Fresh prawn rolls		Cooking tips: 91. preparing prawns 92. serving & fillet a fish 93. carving a whole ham 94. roasting pork with crispy skin 95. chilling wine in 6 minutes
Cooking equipments: roasting & baking trays Guide: shellfish (brown shrimp, atlantic prawn, tiger prawn, giant tiger prawn, langoustine)
20	"Special Salads & Fabulous Fruits"	5 October 2012
Recipes: 96. Green papaya salad 97. Chopped salad 98. Green bean salad with mustard dressing 99. Roasted red pepper, lentil & herb salad 100. Raspberry mille-feuille		Cooking tips: 96. preparing scallops 97. skinning tomatoes 98. seeding pomegranates 99. adding ice cream or lemon mascarpone to fruit 100. leftover pastry
Guide: salad (spinach, pea shoots, watercress, little gem, mustard leaves, lambs leaf, rocket, chicory)
