= Gordon Ramsay =

British celebrity chef (born 1966)

Gordon Ramsay OBE
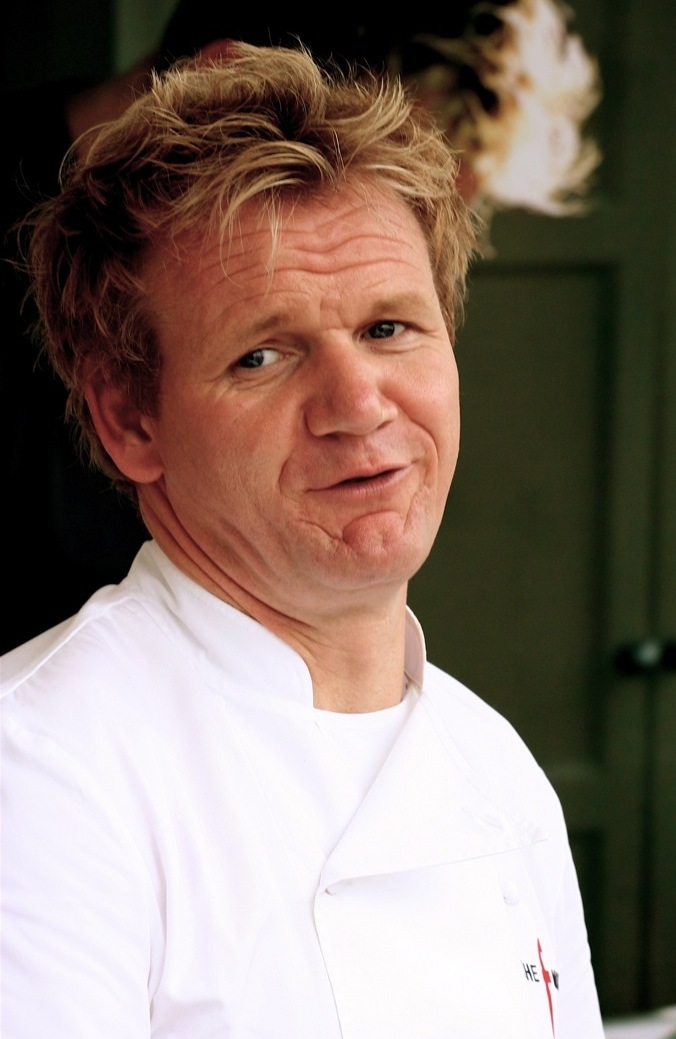
- Ramsay in 2006
- Born: Gordon James Ramsay; 8 November 1966 (age 60); Johnstone, Renfrewshire, Scotland
- Education: North Oxfordshire Technical College (Appr.)
- Spouse: Tana Ramsay (m. 1996)
- Children: 6, including Tilly
- Relatives: Adam Peaty (son-in-law)
- Culinary career
- Cooking style: European
- Ratings
- Michelin Stars; The Good Food Guide; AA Rosettes
- Current restaurants
- Restaurant Gordon Ramsay; Le Pressoir d'Argent; Pétrus; Gordon Ramsay au Trianon; Restaurant 1890; Restaurant Gordon Ramsay High; Hell's Kitchen; List of notable restaurants
- Television shows
- Boiling Point; Kitchen Nightmares; Gordon Behind Bars; Gordon Ramsay's Bank Balance; Gordon Ramsay: Cookalong Live; Gordon Ramsay's Food Stars; Gordon Ramsay's Future Food Stars; Gordon Ramsay's Home Cooking; Gordon Ramsay's Ultimate Cookery Course; Gordon Ramsay's 24 Hours to Hell and Back; Gordon Ramsay: Uncharted; Gordon's Great Escape; Hell's Kitchen (British TV series); Hell's Kitchen (American TV series); Hotel Hell; MasterChef (American TV series); MasterChef Junior (American TV series); Next Level Chef (American TV series); Next Level Chef (British TV series); Ramsay's Best Restaurant; Ramsay's Kitchen Nightmares; The F Word (British TV series); The F Word (American TV series); Gordon Ramsay's Secret Service
- Gordon Ramsay's voice Ramsay shares career advice for future chefs during an interview. Recorded 7 January 2014
- Website: www.gordonramsay.com

Gordon James Ramsay (born 8 November 1966) is a British celebrity chef, restaurateur, television presenter and writer. His restaurant group, Gordon Ramsay Restaurants, was founded in 1997 and has been awarded 17 Michelin stars overall, holding nine as of 2026. His signature restaurant, Restaurant Gordon Ramsay in Chelsea, London, has held three Michelin stars since 2001 and is currently run by chef Matt Abé. After rising to fame on the British television miniseries Boiling Point in 1999, Ramsay became one of the best-known and most influential chefs in the world.

Ramsay's media persona is defined by his fiery temper, aggressive behaviour, strict demeanour and frequent use of profanity, including insults and jokes about contestants and their cooking abilities. He has presented television programmes about cookery, such as the British series Hell's Kitchen (2004), Ramsay's Kitchen Nightmares (2004–2009, 2014) and The F Word (2005–2010), with Kitchen Nightmares winning the 2005 and 2008 British Academy Television Award for Best Feature. He is part of the American versions of Hell's Kitchen (2005–present), Kitchen Nightmares (2007–present), MasterChef (2010–present) and MasterChef Junior (2013–present), as well as Hotel Hell (2012–2016), Gordon Behind Bars (2012), Gordon Ramsay's 24 Hours to Hell and Back (2018–2020) and Next Level Chef (2022–present).

Ramsay was appointed an OBE by Queen Elizabeth II in the 2006 New Year Honours list for services to the hospitality industry. He was named the top chef in the UK at the 2000 Catey Awards, and in July 2006 he won the Catey for Independent Restaurateur of the Year, becoming the third person to win three Catey Awards. Forbes listed his 2020 earnings at US $70 million and ranked him at number 19 on its list of the highest-earning celebrities.

== Early life ==
Gordon James Ramsay was born in Johnstone, Scotland, on 8 November 1966, the son of Helen (née Cosgrove), a nurse, and Gordon James Sr., who worked as a swimming pool manager, welder, and shopkeeper. He has an older sister, a younger brother, and a younger sister. After the family moved to England, Ramsay lived on a council estate in Daventry for several years. When Ramsay was nine, the family moved again to the Bishopton area of Stratford-upon-Avon.

He has described his early life as "hopelessly itinerant" and said his family moved constantly, owing to the aspirations and failures of his father, who was an occasionally violent alcoholic. Ramsay described him as a "hard-drinking womaniser". In his autobiography, he said that Gordon James Sr. abused and neglected his children and his wife.

Ramsay started working as a pot washer in a local Indian restaurant where his sister was a waitress. He had hoped to become a footballer and was first chosen to play under-14 football at the age of 12, but his early footballing career was marked by injuries. After a serious knee injury, he was forced to give it up. At the age of 16, he moved out of the family home and into a flat in Banbury.

== Early cooking career ==
Ramsay's interest in cooking began in his teenage years; rather than be known as "the football player with the gammy knee", he decided to pay more serious attention to his culinary education at age 19. Ramsay enrolled at North Oxfordshire Technical College, sponsored by the Rotarians, to study hotel management. He described his decision to enter catering college as "a complete accident".

In the mid-1980s, Ramsay worked as a commis chef at the Wroxton House Hotel. He ran the kitchen and 60-seat dining room at the Wickham Arms until he quit after having sex with the owner's wife. Ramsay then moved to London, where he worked in a series of restaurants until being inspired to work for Marco Pierre White at Harveys.

After working at Harveys for two years and ten months, Ramsay, tired of "the rages and the bullying and violence", decided that the way to further advance his career was to study French cuisine. White discouraged Ramsay from taking a job in Paris, instead encouraging him to work for Albert Roux at Le Gavroche in Mayfair. Ramsay decided to take his advice, and there, Ramsay met Jean-Claude Breton, who later became his maître d'hôtel at Restaurant Gordon Ramsay. After Ramsay worked at Le Gavroche for a year, Roux invited him to work with him at Hotel Diva, a ski resort in the French Alps, as his number two. From there, a 23-year-old Ramsay moved to Paris to work with Guy Savoy and Joël Robuchon, both Michelin-starred chefs. He continued his training in France for three years, before giving in to the physical and mental stress of the kitchens and taking a year to work as a personal chef on the private yacht Idlewild, based in Bermuda. The role on the boat saw him travel to Sicily and Sardinia, Italy, and learn about Italian cuisine.

== Head chef ==
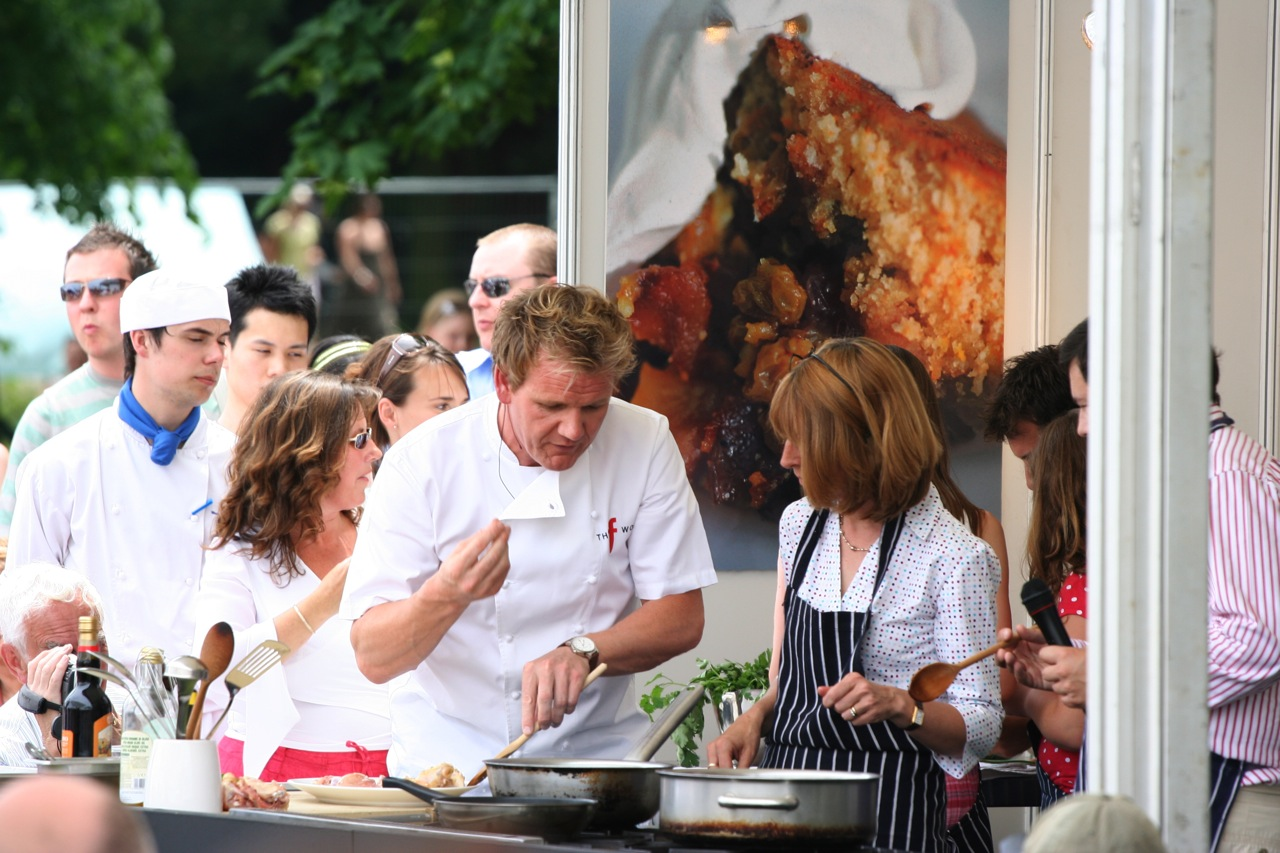
Ramsay cooking in 2006

Upon his return to London in 1993, Ramsay was offered the position of head chef, under chef-patron Pierre Koffmann, at the three-Michelin-starred La Tante Claire in Chelsea. Shortly thereafter, Marco Pierre White reentered his life, offering to set him up with a head chef position and 10% share in the Rossmore, owned by White's business partners. The restaurant was renamed Aubergine and won its first Michelin star 14 months later. In 1997, Aubergine won its second Michelin star. A dispute with Ramsay's business owners, who wanted to turn Aubergine into a chain, and Ramsay's dream of running his own restaurant led to his leaving the partnership in July 1998. He described the decision to set out on his own as "the most important day of my entire cooking career; the most important decision of my life."

In 1998, Ramsay opened his own restaurant in Chelsea, Restaurant Gordon Ramsay, with the help of his father-in-law, Chris Hutcheson, and his former colleagues at Aubergine. The restaurant gained its third Michelin star in 2001, making Ramsay the first Scot to achieve that feat. In 2011, The Good Food Guide named Restaurant Gordon Ramsay the second best restaurant in the UK, behind The Fat Duck in Bray, Berkshire.

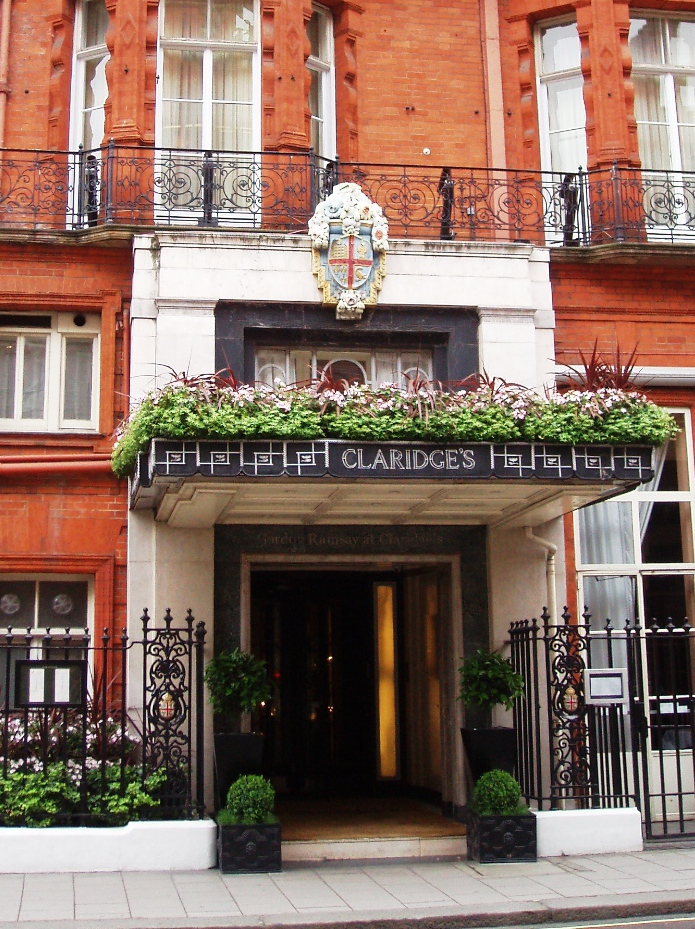
Gordon Ramsay at Claridge's restaurant

After establishing his first restaurant, Ramsay's empire expanded rapidly. He next opened Pétrus, then Amaryllis in Glasgow (which he was later forced to close), and later Gordon Ramsay at Claridge's. He hired his friend and maître d'hôtel Jean-Philippe Susilovic, who works at Pétrus and also appears on Ramsay's US television programme Hell's Kitchen. Restaurants at the Dubai Creek and Connaught hotels followed, the latter branded with his protegee Angela Hartnett's name. Ramsay has opened restaurants outside the UK, beginning with Verre in Dubai. Two restaurants, Gordon Ramsay at Conrad Tokyo and Cerise by Gordon Ramsay, both opened in Tokyo in 2005. In November 2006, Gordon Ramsay at the London opened in New York City, winning top newcomer in the city's coveted Zagat Survey, despite mixed reviews from critics.

In 2007, Ramsay opened his first restaurant in Ireland, Gordon Ramsay at Powerscourt, at the Ritz-Carlton Hotel in Powerscourt, County Wicklow. It closed in 2013. In May 2008, he opened his first restaurant in the Western US, in the London West Hollywood Hotel (formerly the Bel-Air Hotel) on the Sunset Strip in Los Angeles. The contract expired in 2015, closing the restaurant.

On 9 August 2011, Ramsay opened his first Canadian restaurant, Laurier Gordon Ramsay (at the former Rotisserie Laurier BBQ) in Montreal. In February 2012, Danny Lavy, the owner, announced the restaurant was disassociating itself from Ramsay, citing a lack of involvement and understanding on Ramsay's part. The restaurant closed in 2013.

In 2015, Ramsay officially opened his first restaurant in Singapore, Bread Street Kitchen by Gordon Ramsay, at Marina Bay Sands. It is the first Asian outpost that mirrors its London counterpart with an industrial-chic design and a vibrant waterfront setting. The British-European restaurant offers comforting classics like Beef Wellington, Fish & Chips and Sunday Roast.

== Awards ==
In 2001, Restaurant Gordon Ramsay, located at Royal Hospital Road, London, was voted the best restaurant in the UK in the London Zagat Survey and was awarded its third Michelin star. Ramsay was appointed Officer of the Order of the British Empire (OBE) by Queen Elizabeth II in the 2006 New Year Honours list for services to the hospitality industry, but almost missed the award ceremony when his plane was delayed.

In July 2006, Ramsay won the Catey award for "Independent Restaurateur of the Year," becoming only the third person to have won three Catey awards. Ramsay's two previous Catey awards were in 1995 (Newcomer of the Year) and 2000 (Chef of the Year). The other two triple-winners are Michel Roux and Jacquie Pern. In September 2006, he was named as the most influential person in the UK hospitality industry in the annual Caterersearch 100 list, published by Caterer and Hotelkeeper magazine. He overtook Jamie Oliver, who had been top of the list in 2005. Also in 2006, Ramsay was nominated as a candidate for Rector of the University of St Andrews, but lost at the polls to Simon Pepper.

Ramsay's flagship restaurant, Restaurant Gordon Ramsay, was voted London's top restaurant in Harden's for eight years, but in 2008 was placed below Pétrus, a restaurant run by former protégé Marcus Wareing. In January 2013, Ramsay was inducted into the Culinary Hall of Fame.

On 14 June 2017, Ramsay set a new Guinness world record for the 'Fastest time to fillet a 10 lb fish', one minute and five seconds. On 16 August, Ramsay set a Guinness world record for the Longest Pasta Sheet Rolled in 60 Seconds', which measured 1.45 metres. In June 2022, he was recognised by the International Hospitality Institute as one of the 100 Most Powerful People in Global Hospitality. On 11 May 2023, Ramsay along with Nick DiGiovanni set the Guinness World Record for the largest Beef Wellington. It came in at a weight of 25.76 kg (56.79 lb). It also measured 2 ft 5 inches long by 13 inches wide and 8 inches tall.

On 18 November 2026, Ramsay was awarded a star on the Hollywood Walk of Fame for his accomplishments on television.

== Gordon Ramsay Holdings ==
All of Ramsay's business interests (restaurants, media, consultancy) are held in the company Gordon Ramsay Holdings Limited, which was run in partnership with his father-in-law, Chris Hutcheson, and incorporated on 29 October 1997. Ramsay owns a 69% stake, valued at £67 million in 2007. Whereas previous ventures acted as a combined consultant/brand, in November 2006 Ramsay announced plans to create three restaurants in the United States. These opened in 2006/2007 at the London Hotel in Manhattan, in October 2006, the Cielo in Boca Raton, Florida, and at the London Hotel in West Hollywood, California. Ramsay acts as a consultant to numerous catering organisations. In 2005 he was recruited by Singapore Airlines as one of its "International Culinary Panel" consultants.

In late 2006, Gordon Ramsay Holdings purchased three London pubs, which were converted into gastropubs. These are: The Narrow in Limehouse, which opened in March 2007, the Devonshire in Chiswick, which opened in October 2007 and The Warrington in Maida Vale, which opened in February 2008. Both The Devonshire and The Warrington were sold in 2011. In May 2008, it was confirmed that Ramsay's protege of 15 years, Marcus Wareing, was going solo, having opened and operated Pétrus at The Berkeley Hotel on behalf of Gordon Ramsay Holdings since 2003. With the name Pétrus owned by Gordon Ramsay Holdings, industry sources suggested it was likely to transfer to another restaurant in the group with the former La Noisette site identified as the most likely. In April 2010, Jason Atherton, executive chef of Maze restaurants worldwide, resigned to open his own venue in Mayfair.

On 19 October 2010, the company Gordon Ramsay Holdings Limited announced that Chris Hutcheson had left his position as CEO. Shortly afterwards, Ramsay released a letter to the press describing how he had unravelled the "manipulative" Hutcheson's "complex life" after having had him followed by a private detective. His father-in-law's "away days," wrote Ramsay, "were rarely what I thought they were." Company accounts show Hutcheson borrowed up to £1.5 million from Gordon Ramsay Holdings, though Hutcheson says he reported the borrowings to the company and paid the money back. Hutcheson said he had been "vaporised" and subjected to a "public hanging" by Ramsay, whom he described as a friendless egotist. In April 2017, Hutcheson pleaded guilty to a charge of conspiracy to hack into the computers of Gordon Ramsay Holdings Limited.

In October 2012, Ramsay opened The Fat Cow in Los Angeles at The Grove, a shopping area that is also popular with tourists. Ramsay explained his intention for the Fat Cow in a press release to signify the opening of the venue: "The concept for The Fat Cow came from my desire to have a neighbourhood restaurant that you could go to all the time to just relax and enjoy a terrific meal." The Fat Cow closed in 2014 amid legal issues. That year also saw the opening of Gordon Ramsay Steak in Las Vegas. The steakhouse concept has since expanded to other locations including the Horseshoe Casino Lake Charles, LA; Atlantic City, and Baltimore, with an announced location due in Vancouver in 2024.

In partnership with footballer David Beckham, Ramsay opened the Union Street Café in the Southwark district of London, UK in September 2013. The Italian cuisine of the Union Street Café, with a menu that revolved on a daily basis, was overseen by Chef Davide Degiovanni. The Union Street Café's location in Southwark was taken over in 2020–21 by two other Gordon Ramsay restaurants: Street Pizza, and Bread Street Kitchen & Bar. In 2015, Bread Street Kitchen opened in Singapore, marking the expansion of Ramsay’s British-European dining concept, which also includes locations in Edinburgh, Liverpool, and Sanya. In December 2012, the Las Vegas opening of Gordon Ramsay Burger occurred. Other locations of the gourmet hamburger dining establishment would open up in the 2020s, Notably in Chicago, Boston, Seoul, and at Harrods Department Store in London.

In October 2013, the Gordon Ramsay at The London restaurant in New York lost its two Michelin stars owing to issues encountered by the Michelin reviewers. The guide's director Michael Ellis stated that he was served "some very erratic meals" and also experienced "issues with consistency." The loss followed the closure of another of Ramsay's restaurants, Gordon Ramsay at Claridge's, in June 2013. In January 2018, Ramsay opened his first location of Gordon Ramsay Hell's Kitchen restaurants, based on the television show. After that site opened on the Las Vegas Strip, six other locations have either been opened or announced, with one in Dubai and the others in the United States.

On 17 April 2018, Ramsay's first Street Pizza opened, situated in the downstairs area of his One New Change Bread Street Kitchen offering "bottomless" pizza. The second "Street Pizza" was opened at the chef's York and Albany restaurant, with further locations opening elsewhere later on in London, Dubai, and the USA. On 26 June 2019, Chloe Sorvino from Forbes magazine reported that Ramsay had struck a $100 million deal with Lion Capital, a private equity firm headquartered in London. Together they formed a subsidiary of the Gordon Ramsay Restaurant group, with Ramsay and Lion each taking 50% ownership, naming it Gordon Ramsay North America (GRNA), and originally intended to open 100 restaurants in the USA by 2024. Those plans were slowed down by the COVID-19 pandemic: in December 2021 GRNA CEO Norman Abdallah stated in a new interview that their updated strategy was to open 75 new company-owned locations across the United States between 2022 and 2026.

On 24 March 2020, Ramsay laid off more than 500 staff in the UK after several of Ramsay's restaurants closed temporarily due to the COVID-19 lockdowns. Ramsay, whose personal net income was estimated to be US$63 million in 2019 by Forbes, was criticised for the lay-offs.

On 3 December 2020, Ramsay's first Street Burger opened, in the St. Paul's area of London. In March 2021, Ramsay launched his own brand of California wines; produced in collaboration with Master Sommelier Chris Miller and International Wine Expert Nick Dumergue at Seabold Cellars in Monterey, California. The Gordon Ramsay Academy, a cookery school, opened in Woking, Surrey, in September 2021.

On 11 October 2023, Ramsay opened his first restaurant in Macao, Gordon Ramsay Pub & Grill, at the new The Londoner Macao hotel and casino (formerly the Sands Cotai Central).

The Gordon Ramsay Bar & Grill Philippines opened in Newport World Resorts in August 2024.

=== Pre-prepared meal controversy ===
On 17 April 2009, it was revealed that one of Ramsay's restaurants, Foxtrot Oscar in London's Chelsea area, used pre-prepared food that was heated up and sold with mark-ups of up to 586%. It was also revealed that three of his gastropubs in London did the same thing. A spokeswoman for Ramsay said, "Gordon Ramsay chefs prepare components of dishes devised and produced to the highest Gordon Ramsay standards. These are supplied to those kitchens with limited cooking space such as Foxtrot Oscar and Gordon Ramsay's highly acclaimed pubs, including the Narrow. These are sealed and transported daily in refrigerated vans and all menu dishes are then cooked in the individual kitchens. This is only for the supply of Foxtrot Oscar and the three pubs and allows each establishment to control the consistency and the quality of the food served." Reflecting on the controversy in 2010, Ramsay was unapologetic: "When I was working at the Gavroche all those years ago, the duck terrine wasn't made there. It was made outside, then brought to the restaurant wrapped in plastic. This is standard practice. What on earth was the fuss about?"

== Television ==
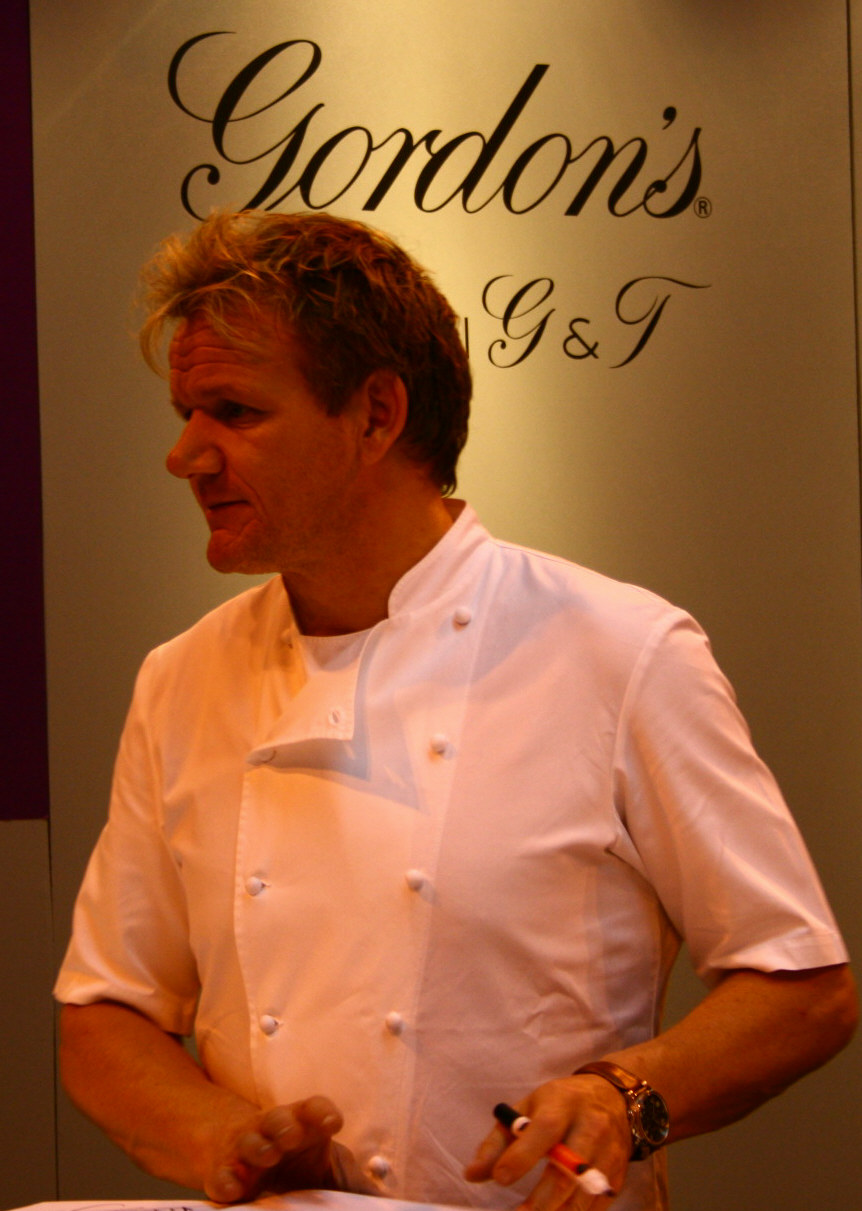
Ramsay on The F Word Series 3 in 2007

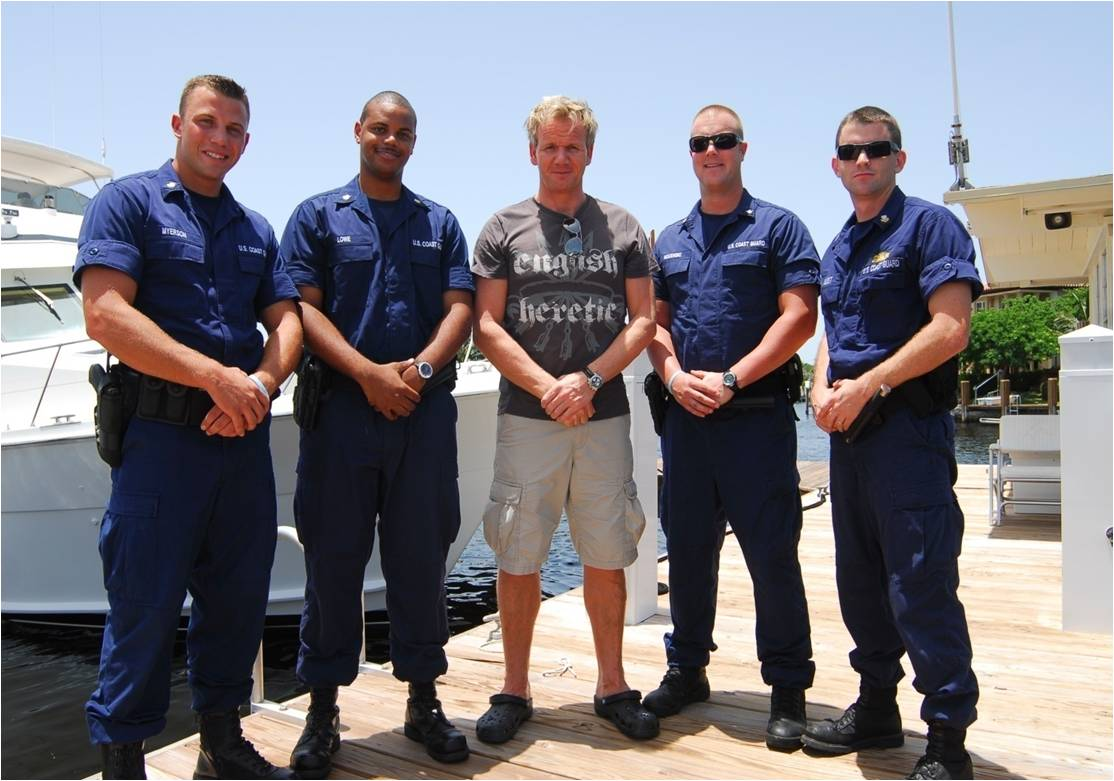
Ramsay and U.S. Coast Guard filmed on Kitchen Nightmares in 2010

Ramsay's first documented role in television was in two fly-on-the-kitchen-wall documentaries: Boiling Point (1999) and Beyond Boiling Point (2000), but he had appeared previously as a judge on a MasterChef-like series for young catering students in 1997, with his then restaurant partner, where he was seen bullying the young man that had won the chance to spend a week working in Ramsay's restaurant. Ramsay appeared on series three of Faking It in 2001, helping the prospective chef, a burger flipper named Ed Devlin, learn the trade. This episode won the 2001 BAFTA for "Best Factual TV Moment."

In 2004, Ramsay appeared in two British television series. Ramsay's Kitchen Nightmares aired on Channel 4 and saw the chef troubleshooting failing restaurants over one week. This series ran its fifth series in 2007. Hell's Kitchen, a reality show which aired on ITV1, saw Ramsay attempt to train ten British celebrities to be chefs, as they ran a restaurant on Brick Lane in the East End of London, which opened to the public for the two-week duration of the show. Although he was the creator of Hell's Kitchen, Ramsay only starred in the first series, as he signed a four-year contract with Channel 4, ruling out any possibility of him appearing on future episodes of the ITV-produced show.

In May 2005, the Fox network introduced Ramsay to American audiences in an American version of Hell's Kitchen produced by Granada Entertainment and A. Smith & Co. The show follows a similar premise to the original British series, showcasing Ramsay's perfectionism and infamously short temper. Ramsay had also hosted an American version of Kitchen Nightmares, which premiered on Fox on 19 September 2007. On 23 June 2014, Ramsay announced he was ending the series. In June 2018, Gordon Ramsay's 24 Hours to Hell and Back, a new series with a premise much like Kitchen Nightmares but a shorter timeline, premiered on Fox.

Ramsay has presented five series of a food-based magazine programme titled The F Word; it launched on Channel 4 on 27 October 2005. The show is organised around several key recurring features, notably a brigade competition, a guest cook competition, a food-related investigative report, and a series-long project of raising animals to be served in the finale. The guest cook (usually a celebrity) prepares a dish of their own choosing and places it in competition against a similar dish submitted by Ramsay. The dishes are judged by diners who are unaware of who cooked which dish and, if the guest wins (as they have on numerous occasions), their dish is served at Ramsay's restaurant. The American version premiered on 31 May 2017 on Fox.

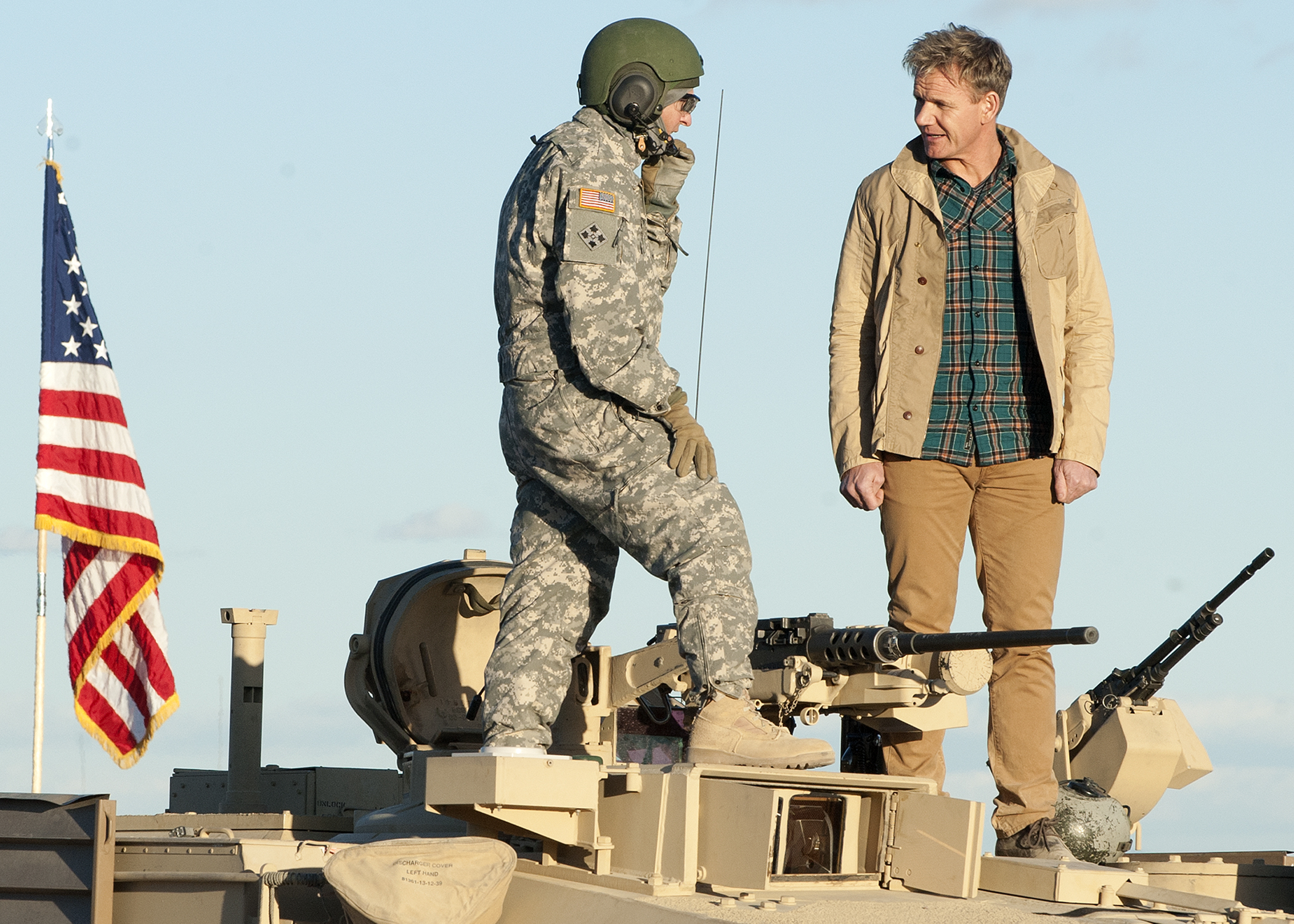
Ramsay and the U.S. Army at Fort Irwin during MasterChef Season 5 in 2014

In July 2006, Channel 4 announced that it had re-signed Ramsay to an exclusive four-year deal at the network, running until July 2011. The series became one of the highest rated shows aired on Channel 4 each week. During one episode of The F Word, Ramsay cooked in Doncaster Prison in Marshgate for its inmates. The chef was so impressed by the speed at which a prisoner, Kieron Tarff, chopped vegetables that he offered him a job at his restaurant following his release in 2007.

In 2010, Ramsay served as a producer and judge on the American version of MasterChef. (A second season of the show began in June 2011, again starring Ramsay.) On that same show, he was joined by culinary judges Graham Elliot and Joe Bastianich. He starred in a travelogue about his visit to India, Gordon's Great Escape followed by a series set in Asia. He hosted the series Ramsay's Best Restaurant, which was the first British series by Ramsay's own production company, One Potato Two Potato.

Ramsay joined several other celebrity chefs in the 2010 series, The Big Fish Fight, where he, along with fellow chef Jamie Oliver and a few others, spent time on a trawler boat to raise awareness about the discarding of hundreds of thousands of sea fish. In March 2012, Fox announced the coming of Ramsay's fourth series for the Fox network, Hotel Hell; the series is similar to Kitchen Nightmares, except that it focuses on struggling hotels, motels, and other lodging establishments in the United States. Originally slated for debut 6 April 2012 and 4 June 2012, the series debuted 13 August 2012. In August 2021, he signed a deal with Fox.

=== Guest appearances ===
In September 2005, Ramsay, along with Jamie Oliver, Heston Blumenthal, Wolfgang Puck, and Sanjeev Kapoor, were featured in CNN International's Quest, in which Richard Quest stepped into the shoes of celebrity chefs. In 2006 and 2008, Ramsay took part in a television series for ITV, following the lead-up to Soccer Aid, a celebrity charity football match, in which he played only the first half, nursing an injury picked up in training. Ramsay captained the Rest of the World XI against an England XI captained by Robbie Williams.

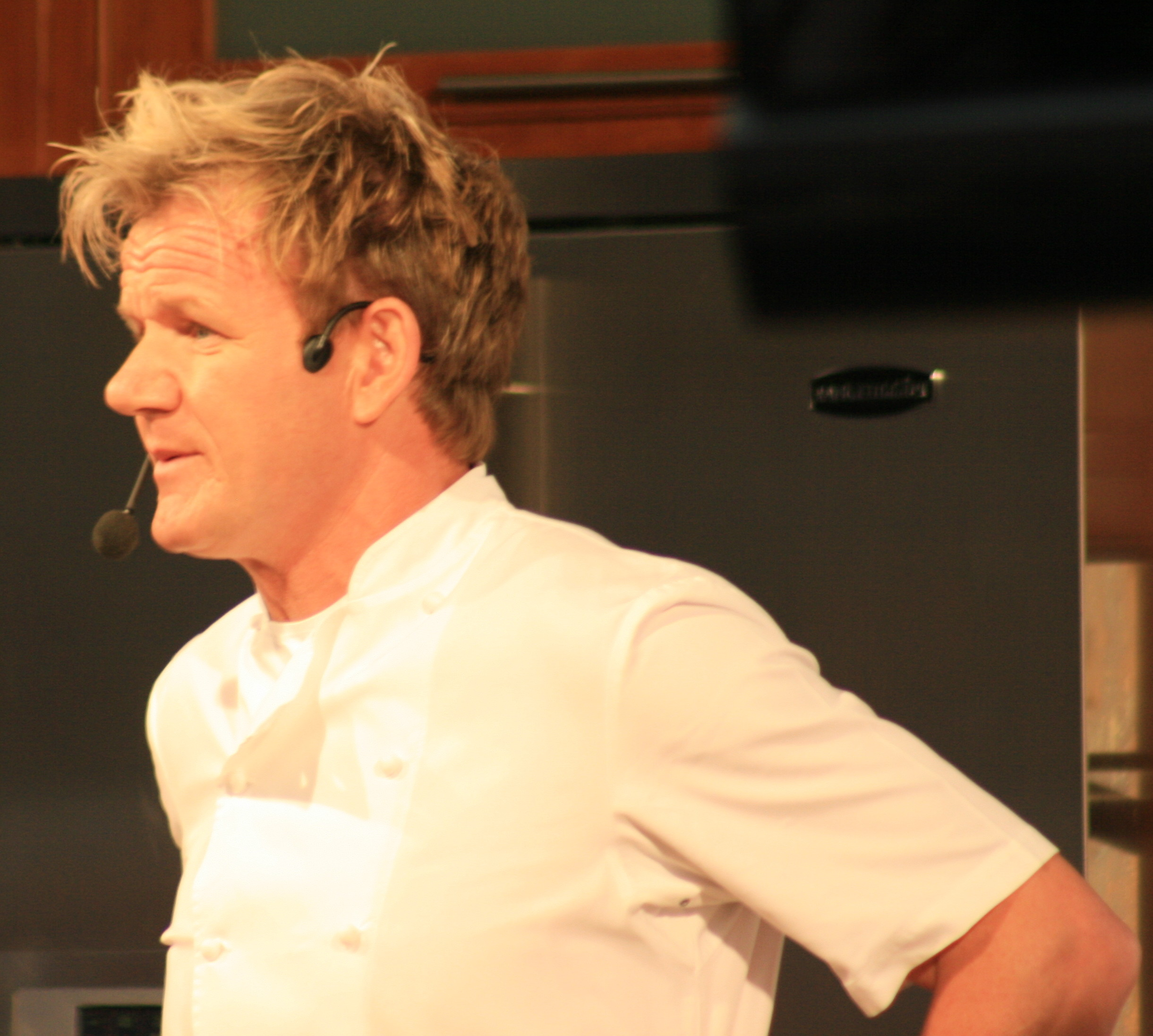
Ramsay on the BBC's Gardeners' World in 2008

During his second appearance on the BBC's Top Gear, he stated that his current cars were a Ferrari F430 and a Range Rover Sport Supercharged, the latter replacing the Bentley Continental GT he previously owned. On 14 May 2006, he appeared on Top Gear in the "Star in a Reasonably-Priced Car" segment. Ramsay held the top spot on Top Gear's celebrity leader board, with a lap time of 1:46.38 until overtaken by Simon Cowell.

Ramsay starred in part of a National Blood Service "Give Blood" television advertisement in England, in which he said that he would have died from a ruptured spleen had it not have been for another person's blood donation. On 13 October 2006, he was guest host on the first episode of the BBC's comedy panel show Have I Got News for You's 32nd series. On 27 December 2007, Ramsay appeared in the Extras Christmas special.

In January 2008, Ramsay also guest featured on Channel 4's Big Brother: Celebrity Hijack as the Big Brother housemates took part in his Cookalong Live television show. Gordon spoke directly to the Big Brother House via the house plasma screens, regularly checking on the progress of the contestants. In 2011, during the results show of American Idol, footage of the top 5 contestants taking on a challenge of cooking with Gordon Ramsay was shown. The Top 5 were given 10 minutes to make the best omelettes.

An internet short with Gordon Ramsay and The Muppets

In November 2011, Ramsay appeared in the Simpsons episode "The Food Wife". In February 2017, Ramsay made a guest appearance on New Girl episode "Operation: Bobcat". Ramsay made an appearance on 11 December 2017 broadcast of Please Take Care of My Refrigerator, a South Korean reality television show on JTBC. In November, Ramsay drew criticism for appearing as a brand ambassador for the mass-produced Korean beer Cass; Ramsay defended it as unpretentious and affordable. Ramsay voices the character Bolton Gramercy in Big Hero 6: The Series. The character, a chef with a fiery temper, is loosely based on him.

=== Legal proceedings ===
In 1998, following Ramsay's resignation from the Aubergine, A-Z restaurants sued him for £1 million citing lost revenue and breach of contract, but eventually settled out of court. In June 2006, Ramsay won a High Court case against the London Evening Standard newspaper, in which Victor Lewis Smith had alleged, after reports from previous owner Sue Ray, that scenes and the general condition of Bonaparte's had been faked for Ramsay's Kitchen Nightmares. Ramsay was awarded £75,000 plus costs. Ramsay said at the time: "I won't let people write anything they want to about me. We have never done anything in a cynical fake way."

In June 2007, Ramsay's show was sued by the terminated general manager (Martin Hyde) of the New York restaurant Purnima (Dillon's), who also alleged fakery. Hyde had quit his position at the restaurant during the show, when Ramsay suggested that the owner hire top Indian chef Vikas Khanna as the consultant chef for Purnima. The lawsuit alleged that "unknown to the viewing audience, some or all of Kitchen Nightmares are fake and the so-called 'problems uncovered and solved' by Ramsay are, for the most part, created by Ramsay and his staff for the purpose of making it appear that Ramsay is improving the restaurant." In August 2007, the case was dismissed voluntarily and ordered into arbitration as stipulated in their contract. On 21 March 2012, Ramsay filed a $2.7 million lawsuit against his former partners of his restaurant in Montreal, Quebec, the Laurier Gordon Ramsay (since renamed The Laurier 1936), over lost licensing fees and defamatory statements made against him. On 16 April 2013, just over a year later, Laurier 1936 closed.

In January 2014, Ramsay lost a high court case in relation to the York & Albany pub. Ramsay claimed that his father-in-law had misused a "ghost writing" machine to make Ramsay a personal guarantor for the £640,000 annual rent of that pub. Ramsay tried to nullify the 25-year lease, signed in 2007. The judge said that Ramsay had known about the guarantee beforehand but that he had total trust in his father-in-law, Christopher Hutcheson, and left the deal to him. The judge dismissed the case and ordered Ramsay to pay all legal costs and outstanding monies, in total more than one million pounds. In May 2022, A New York Superior Court judge ended an eight-year legal battle between Gordon Ramsay and his former business partner at The Fat Cow Gordon Ramsay restaurant in Los Angeles, Rowan Seibel, ruling that Gordon Ramsay should be paid $4.5 million (£3.6 million) in damages and court fee coverage.

== Public image ==
=== Personality ===
Ramsay's reputation is built upon his goal of culinary perfection, which is associated with winning three Michelin stars. His mentor, Marco Pierre White, noted that he is highly competitive. Since the airing of Boiling Point, which followed Ramsay's quest of earning three Michelin stars, Ramsay has also become infamous for his fiery temper and use of expletives. Ramsay once famously ejected food critic A. A. Gill, whose dining companion was Joan Collins, from his restaurant, leading Gill to state that "Ramsay is a wonderful chef, just a really second-rate human being." Ramsay stated in his autobiography that he did not mind if Gill insulted his food, but would not tolerate a personal insult. Ramsay has also had confrontations with his kitchen staff, including one incident that resulted in the pastry chef calling the police. However, a 2005 interview reported Ramsay had retained 85% of his staff from 1993. Ramsay attributes his management style to the influence of previous mentors, notably chefs Marco Pierre White and Guy Savoy, and his father-in-law, Chris Hutcheson.

Ramsay's ferocious temper has contributed to his media appeal in both the United Kingdom and the United States, where his programmes are produced. MSN Careers featured an article about television's worst bosses, which listed Ramsay as the only non-fictional boss. They cited his frequent loss of his temper and his harsh critiques, notably when he picks on something other than cooking ability, such as calling someone a "chunky monkey". Although Ramsay often mocks the French, one of his most trusted maîtres d'hôtel, Jean-Baptiste Requien (Royal Hospital Road), is French, and Ramsay also speaks fluent French from his time in Paris. As of 2023, one of his final goals as a chef and restaurateur is to earn the third Michelin Star for Le Pressoir d'Argent, a French restaurant in France.

In November 2007, Ramsay installed 29-year-old Clare Smyth as head chef at his three-Michelin-starred flagship restaurant on Royal Hospital Road. Smyth is the second high-profile appointment of a woman by Ramsay, after Angela Hartnett. Smyth was the first three-Michelin-starred woman; she moved on to start her own restaurant in 2017. Ramsay has been criticised for his frequent use of strong language on his programmes, first by British celebrity cook Delia Smith, then, in relation to Ramsay's Kitchen Nightmares, by Australian Senator Cory Bernardi, who introduced a motion in the Senate to investigate broadcast standards as a result. In his autobiography, Ramsay himself said he was unaware of the extent of his swearing until he watched an episode of Boiling Point. While he stated he did not have a problem with it, "Mum was appalled".

On 5 June 2009, Ramsay started trading insults with Australian A Current Affair journalist Tracy Grimshaw. The day after his interview, he was a guest feature at the Melbourne Food and Wine festival. While doing his display, he allegedly insulted Grimshaw and made insinuations about her sexuality. Grimshaw responded the next day, calling Ramsay an "arrogant, narcissist bully." Ramsay eventually apologised, stating that his behaviour "was a joke". TV Guide included him in their 2013 list of The 60 Nastiest Villains of All Time. Ramsay has also acted as a judge on MasterChef Junior since 2013; in contrast to his interaction with adults, Ramsay states that he takes a more sensitive attitude when working with the underage contestants.

=== Food views ===
Prior to the late 2000s, Ramsay had expressed a dislike for vegetarianism and veganism. In the first episode of the second series of Ramsay's Kitchen Nightmares (2005), he offered pizza to a vegetarian and said it was vegetarian. After he took a bite, Ramsay said that it contained ham, laughing and asked if he wanted more. In 2003, when asked for his most recent lie, he said "To a table of vegetarians who had artichoke soup. I told them it was made with vegetable stock when it was chicken stock." In a 2007 interview, he joked: "My biggest nightmare would be if the kids ever came up to me and said 'Dad, I'm a vegetarian.' Then I would sit them on the fence and electrocute them." In 2016, when asked on Twitter whether he was allergic to anything, he wrote "Vegans" and followed up with: "It's a joke jack it's not vegans! It's vegetarians".

In 2006, on the second series of The F Word, Ramsay showed a softened stance on vegetarianism after learning about intensive pig farming practices, including castration and tail docking, while letting two young family piglets live in an intensive farm. On the programme, Ramsay commented: "It's enough to make anyone turn fucking vegetarian, for God's sake. And I've always sort of knocked vegetarians and vegans for missing out on the most amazing flavour you can get from meat. But you can see why so many people change instantly". In 2019, he launched a vegan menu at his restaurants for Veganuary, and introduced more vegan items to his restaurants, such as a vegan roast. In 2022, on an episode of Master Chef: Back to Win, Ramsay said, "After all these years, I can finally admit, that I actually love vegan food."

=== Other chefs ===
He was a head judge of MasterChef USA when Nick DiGiovanni came third place in season 10. On 11 May 2023, DiGiovanni, alongside Gordon Ramsay, broke the Guinness World Record for the largest beef Wellington, which weighed 25.76 kilograms (56.79 pounds). This was DiGiovanni's 8th Guinness World Record and was broken in partnership with celebrity chefs: Max the Meat Guy, Guga Foods, and Ahmad Alzahabi.

=== Eating and exercising habits ===
Ramsay said in 2016 that he exercised semi-competitively for his general well-being. He said he had seen overweight and unfit chefs collapse or become unable to move quickly around the kitchen. He often competes in Ironman events, marathons, and triathlons. Ramsay also eats very small meals, preferring to graze throughout the day, partly due to the habit he built up as a judge and chef, and also because of his busy schedule. He has a black belt in karate. Ramsay told Joe Wicks that cycling had improved his physical and mental health, especially during the COVID-19 pandemic.

== Personal life ==
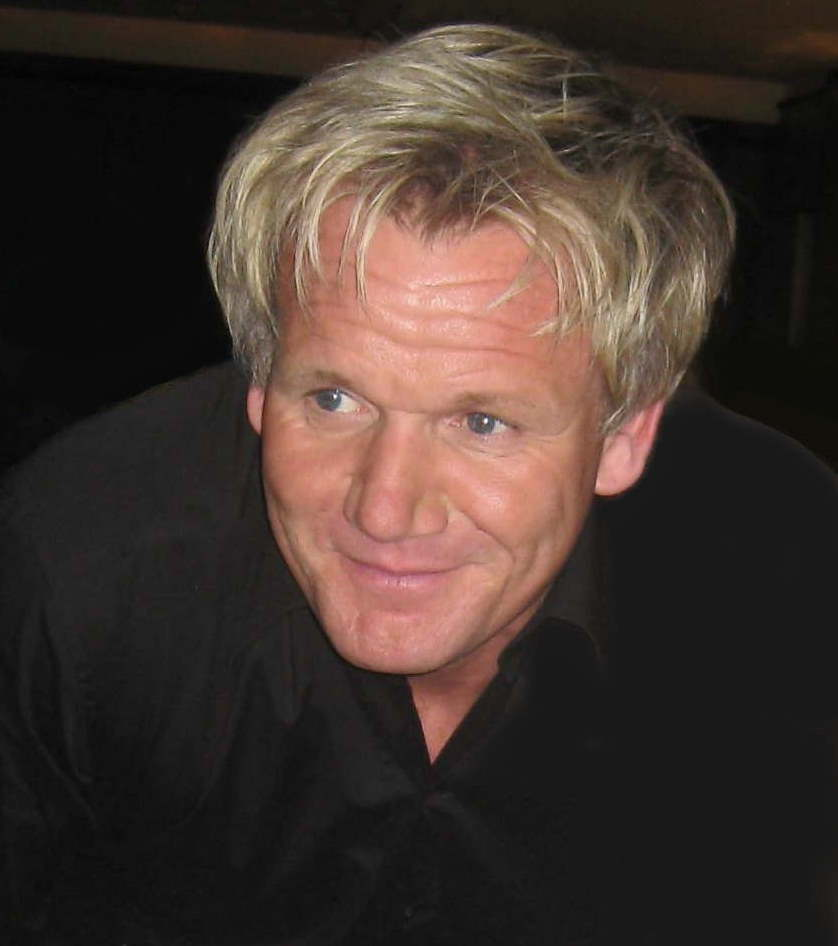
Ramsay in 2010

=== Family ===
Ramsay married Tana Hutcheson, a Montessori-trained schoolteacher, in 1996. They divide their time between Los Angeles and the Wandsworth Common area of London, and they have six children. Years after their fourth child, daughter Tilly, was born, Tana gave birth at 20 weeks to a son, Rocky, who died shortly thereafter. Fifth child, Oscar, was a result of the loss of Rockey, according to Gordon. Later on they had one more, son Jesse. Tilly Ramsay is a television chef and presenter.

Until 2010, Ramsay's father-in-law, Chris Hutcheson, was responsible for the business operations of Ramsay's restaurant empire. On 7 June 2017, Hutcheson was jailed for six months for conspiring to hack a computer system relating to the Ramsays' business interests. Hutcheson was accused, along with his sons, of accessing company systems almost 2,000 times between 23 October 2010 and 31 March 2011.

Ramsay has three houses in Cornwall that are collectively worth an estimated £11 million: a £4 million mansion in Trebetherick, a £4.4 million property in Rock, and a £2 million Grade II listed property in Fowey. In August 2020, the Fowey property was put on sale for £2.75 million.

=== Legal issues ===
In March 1993, Ramsay and two other men chefs were arrested at London's Green Park tube station for gross indecency, and cautioned.

On 8 June 1999, Ramsay was arrested after being accused of assaulting a member of his staff at Royal Hospital Road, Chelsea. He denied the accusations.

=== Alleged affair ===
In 2008, Sarah Symonds alleged that she and Ramsay had had an affair for seven years, beginning in 2001; Ramsay denied the allegation. Symonds, who made a series of revelations in her book which provided hints for having affairs with married men, also had an affair with Jeffrey Archer, and claimed to have had one as well with an unnamed US star. He denied the allegations, though admitted he knew Symonds, and had met her only four times. At the time, he was reported as stating, "I'm so sorry I've put [wife, Tana] through this. I've apologised to her and feel absolutely dreadful. I've been a fool. She really doesn't deserve all the grief".

=== Car collection ===
Ramsay is a car enthusiast with a love for Ferrari. He maintains a sizeable car collection in the UK which includes the following:

- Ferrari LaFerrari painted in Grigio Ferro
- Ferrari LaFerrari Aperta painted in Bianco Italia
- Ferrari F12tdf painted in Bianco Italia
- Ferrari Monza SP2 painted in Nero Daytona
- Ferrari 488 Spider
- Ferrari 488 Pista
- Ferrari 812 Superfast
- Ferrari 575 Superamerica painted in Giallo Modena
- Aston Martin DBS Superleggera
- McLaren Senna in exposed carbon fibre and yellow accents
- McLaren 675LT Spider painted in Chicane Grey
- Porsche 918 Spyder painted in Sapphire Blue Metallic
- BAC Mono

Ramsay displayed his collection in a video posted to his YouTube channel filmed at Brands Hatch.

=== Charity work ===
Ramsay has been involved in a series of charitable events and organisations. He fulfilled his aim of finishing 10 marathons in 10 years by running his 10th consecutive London Marathon on 26 April 2009, sponsoring the Scottish Spina Bifida Association. Ramsay has been Honorary Patron of the Scottish Spina Bifida Association since 2004, and in 2005 he launched The Gordon Ramsay "Buy a Brick" appeal to help the organisation raise funds to build a new Family Support Centre and Head Office in Glasgow. In 2006, he launched a new appeal to help the charity raise the funds required to continue to run the support centre: "What's your favourite 'F' Word? Gordon's is Fundraising." In November 2007, Ramsay hosted a St Andrew's Day Gala Dinner at Stirling Castle in aid of the Association and has now made this fundraising Gala Dinner an annual event.

During March 2005, Ramsay teamed up with Indian chef Madhur Jaffrey to help the VSO, an international development charity group, to support its Spice Up Your Life event. The charity hoped to raise £100,000 for VSO's work in HIV and AIDS in India. The Ramsays were the first couple to become ambassadors for the women's charity Women's Aid in 2005. The couple ran the Flora Families marathon to support Women's Aid. In 2006, 2008, 2010, 2012, and 2014, Ramsay took part in the biennial charity event Soccer Aid to raise money for UNICEF. On 6 June 2010 he played for the Rest of the World team alongside former professional footballers Zinedine Zidane and Luís Figo as well as Hollywood actors Woody Harrelson, Mike Myers, and Michael Sheen. The match took place at Old Trafford in Manchester and was won by the Rest of the World for the first time, the winning penalty scored by Harrelson in the shoot-out. On 28 August 2020, the media reported that Ramsay and his wife Tana had become ambassadors for Cornwall Air Ambulance.

=== Life-threatening experiences ===
In 2008, Ramsay was in Iceland's Westman Islands filming a puffin hunting segment when he lost his footing and fell during a descent off an 85-metre (279 ft) cliff, landing in the icy water below. He was able to swim back up to the surface of the water by removing his heavy boots and waterproof clothing. His film crew, who rescued him by throwing him a rope, reported that he was submerged for at least 45 seconds. He later recalled, "I thought I was a goner. I was panicking and my lungs were filling with water. When I got to the top after getting my boots off, I was dazed and my head was totally massive."

In June 2024, Ramsay was involved in a bicycle accident in the U.S. state of Connecticut that left bruising on the entirety of his left abdomen. He later remarked on social media that his helmet saved his life, and emphasised the importance of wearing a helmet while cycling.

=== Cornwall comments ===
On 23 March 2022 in an interview for BBC Radio 2, Ramsay remarked, "Trust me I absolutely love Cornwall, it's just the Cornish I can't stand." This was criticised by the leader of the political party Mebyon Kernow, Dick Cole. Ramsay's spokesman said the statement was "tongue-in-cheek."

=== Football ===
Ramsay played football and was first chosen to play under-14 football at age 12. He was chosen to play for Warwickshire. His footballing career was marked by injuries, causing him to remark later in life, "Perhaps I was doomed when it came to football." In mid-1984, Ramsay had a trial with Rangers, the club he supported as a boy. He seriously injured his knee, smashing the cartilage during training. Ramsay has claimed to have played two first-team games for Rangers. According to his autobiography, Ramsay played "a couple of non-league matches as a trialist" for Rangers and was signed by the club at the age of 15. Allan Cairns, a photographer who took a picture of Ramsay playing for Rangers in September 1985, said the photo was not one of the Rangers first team but a side picked to play a testimonial match. A Rangers spokesman said: "Ramsay was a trialist in that testimonial game. He trained with us for a few months after that but then got injured."

==== Rangers revisited ====
In series 4, episode 12, of The F Word (originally aired on 29 July 2008), Ramsay visited Ibrox, the home ground of his favourite childhood team, Rangers, and exclaimed, "Home sweet home!" He explained, "My dream came true when I was spotted in the mid-[19]80s and I joined the youth team here in Ibrox." He related that one of his fondest memories is playing alongside former Rangers and Scotland striker Ally McCoist, who said about Ramsay: "I remember him well and the one thing that never ever will change is that he's a competitive so-and-so and wants to do and be the best that he can." Ramsay recalled that "the pain of being released on the back of an injury" was only assuaged many years later "after receiving [his] third Michelin Star", and concluded, "Without the upset at Ibrox, I would not be the chef I am today."

=== Other interests ===
Ramsay is a football fan and supports Rangers and Chelsea. As a baseball fan, he follows the Los Angeles Dodgers and Los Angeles Angels. However, he feels that the game of baseball is often too long, joking that this leads to fans spending most of the time eating or sleeping, which could lead to them being unhealthy. Ramsay is also a fan of Formula One, having grown up close to Silverstone Circuit and idolizing world champions Ayrton Senna and Nigel Mansell.

=== Health ===
In August 2025, Ramsay announced that he had undergone treatment for basal-cell carcinoma, which had developed below his ear.

== Restaurants owned or operated by Ramsay ==
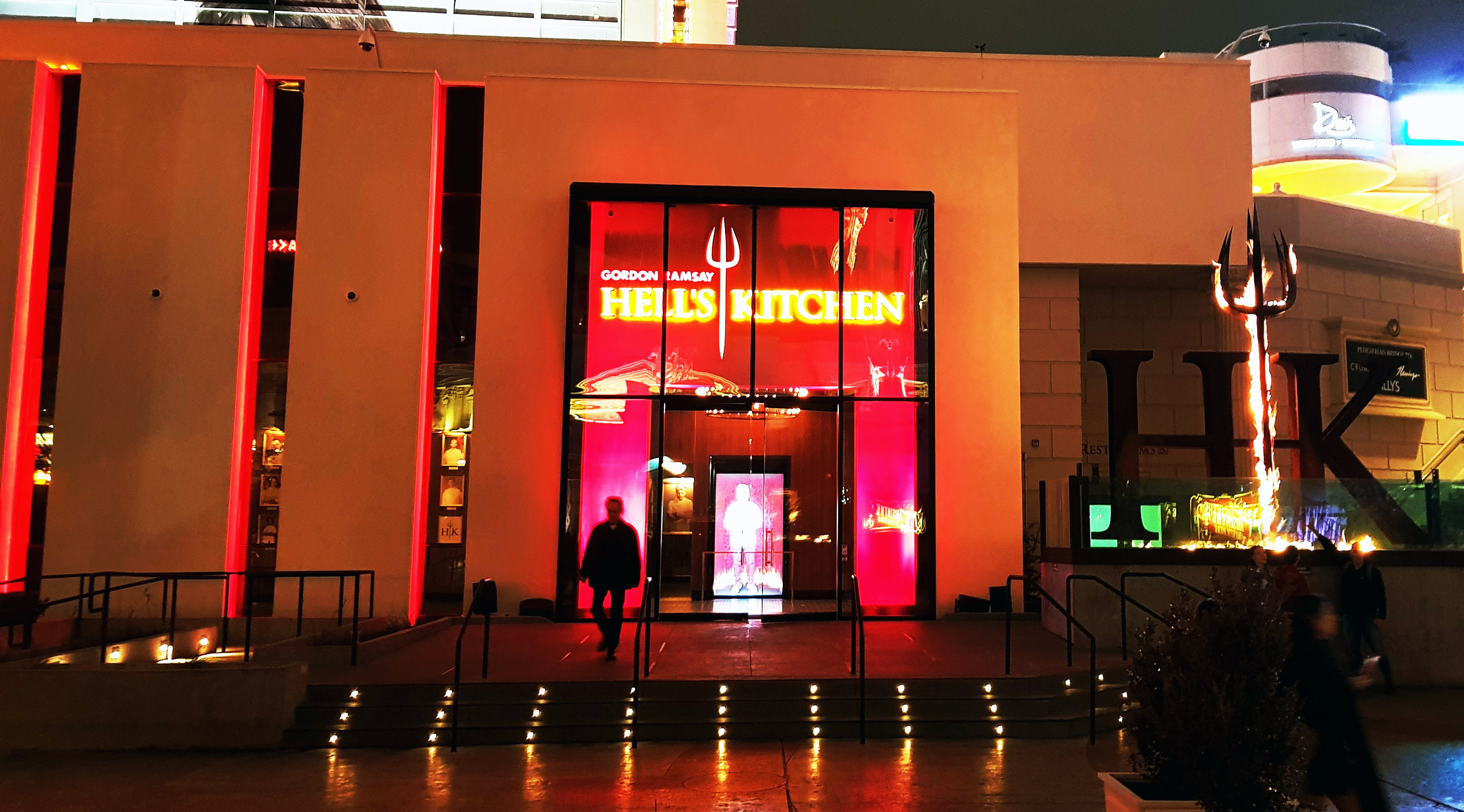
Gordon Ramsay Hell's Kitchen at Caesars Palace Las Vegas (January 2019)

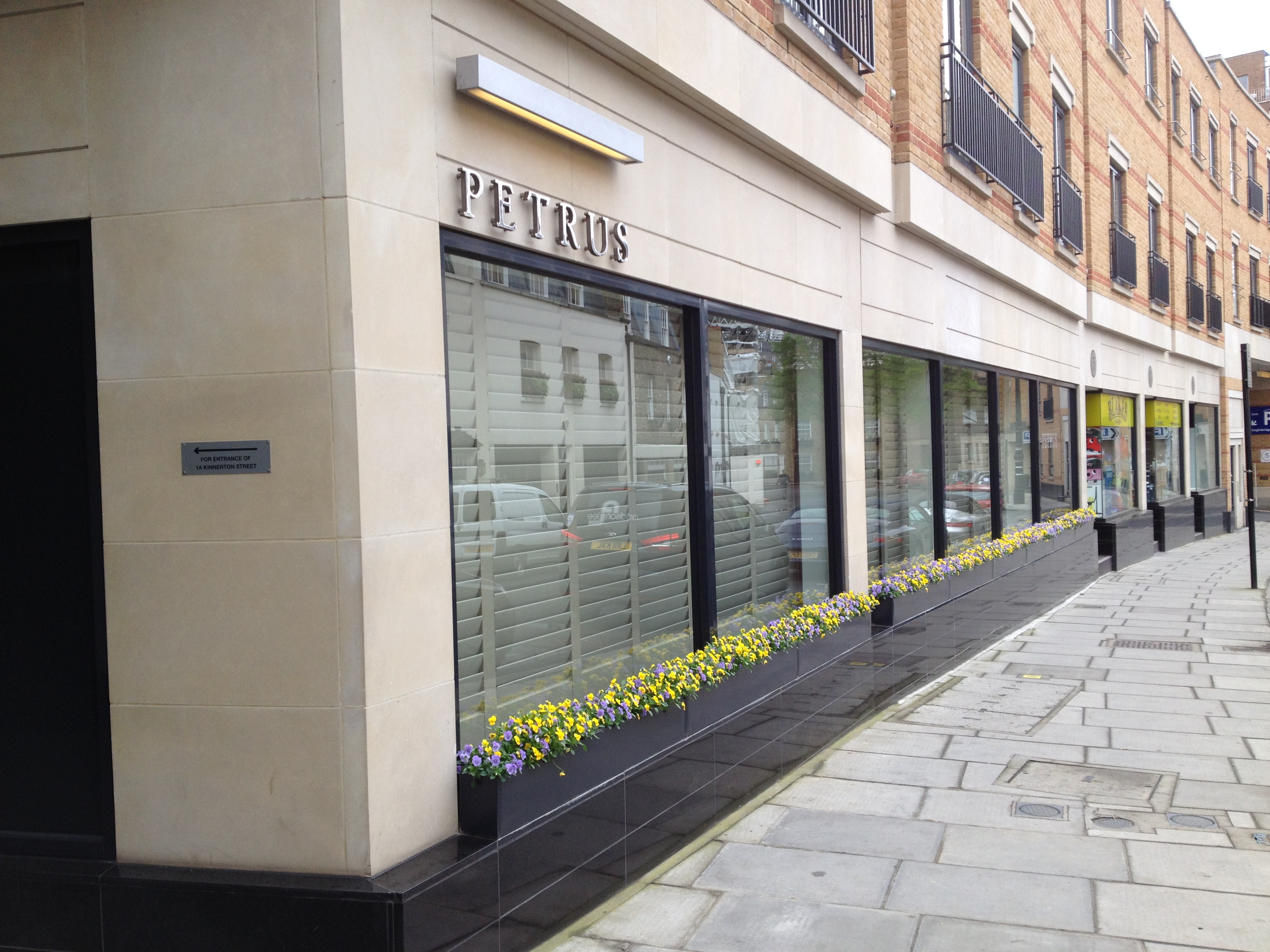
Pétrus by Gordon Ramsay on Kinnerton Street in London (April 2014)

Ramsay founded his first restaurant group, Gordon Ramsay Restaurants, in 1997. He has owned and operated a number of restaurants since he first became head chef of Aubergine in 1993. He owned 25% of that restaurant, where he earned his first two Michelin stars. Following the dismissal of protege Marcus Wareing from sister restaurant L'Oranger, Ramsay organised a staff walkout from both restaurants and subsequently took them to open up Restaurant Gordon Ramsay, at Royal Hospital Road, London. His self-titled restaurant went on to become his first and only three Michelin star restaurant.

Ramsay has installed a number of proteges in restaurants. Both Angela Hartnett and Jason Atherton worked at Verre before moving back to London to The Connaught and Maze respectively. Atherton left to open his own restaurant, and Hartnett purchased Murano from Ramsay in 2010. Wareing was made head chef of London-based restaurant Pétrus. It went on to win two Michelin stars, but in 2008 the two chefs fell out; Wareing kept the restaurant premises and the stars, while Ramsay received rights to the name. The restaurant was renamed Marcus Wareing at the Berkeley, while in 2010 the new Pétrus by Gordon Ramsay was opened.

Ramsay has launched several Hell's Kitchen-themed restaurants based on the TV show he has hosted. The first Gordon Ramsay Hell's Kitchen restaurant opened in front of Caesars Palace on the Las Vegas Strip in January 2018. Ramsay has also created other chains and individual restaurants in various countries.

== Filmography ==
=== Television ===
Year	Title	Network	Notes/Air Dates	Ref
2002, 2006	Top Gear	BBC Two	22 December 2002, 14 May 2006	
2004	Hell's Kitchen	ITV	Returned for 3 more series with Gary Rhodes, John Christope-Novelli & Marco-Pierre White	
2004–2009	Ramsay's Kitchen Nightmares	Channel 4		
2005–2010	The F Word	Channel 4	27 October 2005 – 7 January 2010	
2005–present	Hell's Kitchen	Fox	30 May 2005 – present	
2006, 2008, 2010, 2012, 2014	Soccer Aid	ITV	May 2006, September 2008, June 2010, May 2012, June 2014	
2007	Extras (Christmas Special)	BBC Two	16 December 2007	
2007–2014, 2023–present	Kitchen Nightmares	Fox	9 series; 113 episodes	
2008	Gordon Ramsay: Cookalong Live	Channel 4	18 January 2008 – 12 December 2008	
2009	Gordon Ramsay: Cookalong Live US	Fox	15 December 2009	
2010	Gordon's Great Escape	Channel 4	Seven episodes; 18 January 2010 – 30 May 2011	
2010	Ramsay's Best Restaurant	Channel 4	14 September 2010 – 9 November 2010	
2010	Christmas with Gordon	Channel 4	December 2010	
2010–present	MasterChef	Fox	27 July 2010 – present	
2011	The Simpsons – "The Food Wife"	Fox	13 November 2011	
2012	Gordon Behind Bars	Channel 4	26 June 2012 – 17 July 2012	
2012	Gordon Ramsay's Ultimate Cookery Course	Channel 4	10 September 2012	
2012	Hotel GB	Channel 4	1 October 2012 – 5 October 2012	
2012–2016	Hotel Hell	Fox	13 August 2012 – 26 July 2016	
2013	Gordon Ramsay's Home Cooking	Channel 4	Twenty-part series; 14 October 2013 – 8 November 2013	
2013	Phineas and Ferb	Disney Channel	Cameo as Chef (voice role) in Season 4 Episode 23 – "Thanks But No Thanks", aired 13 September 2013	
2013 & 2021	Ant & Dec's Saturday Night Takeaway	ITV	1 March 2013: Prank; 27 February 2021: Star Guest Announcer	
2013–present	MasterChef Junior	Fox	27 September 2013 – present	
2014	Ramsay's Costa del Nightmares	Channel 4	23 September 2014	
2014	Masterchef Poland	TVN	19 October 2014	
2015–2019	Matilda and the Ramsay Bunch	CBBC	14 April 2015 – 26 July 2019 Gordon is also an executive producer.	
2017	The F Word	Fox	1 series; 11 episodes	
2017	The Nightly Show	ITV	Guest presenter; five episodes	
2017	Culinary Genius	ITV	One series; twenty episodes; 17 April 2017 – 12 May 2017	
2017	New Girl	Fox	Cameo as himself in Series 6, Episode 16 – "Operation: Bobcat", aired 13 July 2017	
2017	Gordon Ramsay on Cocaine	ITV	Two-part series; part one 19 October 2017 & part two 26 October 2017	
2017	Mickey Mouse Mixed-Up Adventures (previously known as Mickey and the Roadster Racers)	Disney Junior	5 November 2017. Episode: "Diner Dog Rescue"	
2017	Please Take Care of My Refrigerator	JTBC	11 December 2017	
2018	My Houzz	YouTube	30 January 2018 – Series 2, Episode 1	
2018	The Adventures of Rocky and Bullwinkle	Amazon Prime Video	11 May 2018 – 2 episodes	
2018	MasterChef Australia	Network Ten	27 May 2018 – 30 May 2018	
2018	Big Hero 6: The Series	Disney Channel	Bolton Gramercy (voice role) (1 episode: Food Fight)	
2018–2020	Gordon Ramsay's 24 Hours to Hell & Back	Fox	13 June 2018 – 12 May 2020	
2018–present	Gordon, Gino and Fred: Road Trip	ITV	Series 1; 11 October 2018 & Series 2; 2 April 2020	
2019	Gordon, Gino & Fred: Christmas Road Trip Three Unwise Men	ITV	23 December 2019	
2019–present	Gordon Ramsay: Uncharted	Nat Geo	Series 1; July 2019, Series 2; 7 July 2020, Series 3; 31 May 2021	
2020	MasterChef Australia	Network Ten	Gordon Ramsay Week; 13–19 April 2020	
2020	Gordon, Gino and Fred: Desperately Seeking Santa	ITV	16 December 2020	
2021	Gordon Ramsay's Bank Balance	BBC One	Series one; nine episodes; 24 February 2021 – 12 March 2021. Red Nose Special: 13 March 2021	
2021	Gordon, Gino & Fred Go Greek	ITV	Two-part series	
2022–present	Next Level Chef	Fox	2 January 2022 –	
2022–2023	Gordon Ramsay's Future Food Stars	BBC One	31 March 2022 – 25 May 2023	
2022	Gordon Ramsay: Uncharted Showdown	National Geographic	25 July 2022 –	
2022	Gogglebox: Celebrity Special for SU2C	Channel 4	With Tilly Ramsay; 28 October 2022	
2023–present	Gordon Ramsay's Food Stars	Fox	24 May 2023 –	
2025–present	Gordon Ramsay's Secret Service	Fox	21 May 2025 –	
2026	Being Gordon Ramsay	Netflix	18 February 2026 –	
2026	Rise Of The Rockstar Chef	BBC One	5 November 2026 – 19 November 2026	

=== Film ===
Year	Title	Role	Notes
2011	Love's Kitchen	Himself	Cameo appearance
2015	Burnt	Chef Consultant	
2017	Smurfs: The Lost Village	Baker Smurf	Voice role

=== Video games ===
Year	Title	Role	Notes
2008	Hell's Kitchen: The Game	Himself	Voice
2016	Restaurant Dash with Gordon Ramsay	Himself	Voice
2021	Gordon Ramsay: Chef Blast	Himself	Voice

=== Web ===
Year	Title	Role	Notes
2022	MrBeast	Himself	3 episodes: "I Built Willy Wonka's Chocolate Factory" "I Didn't Eat Food For 30 Days" "$1 vs $500,000 Date"

== Bibliography ==
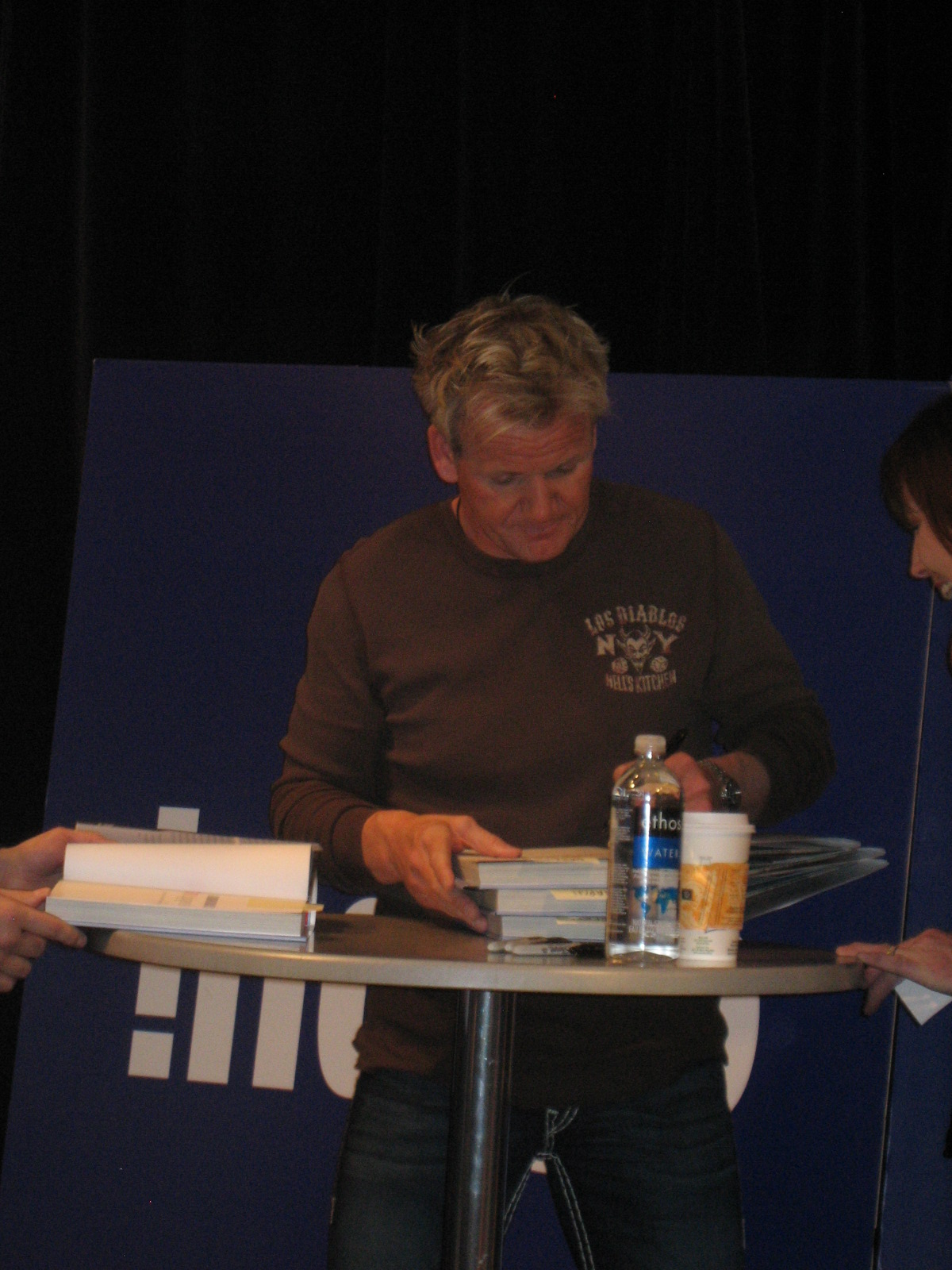
Ramsay signing his book Gordon Ramsay's Healthy Appetite at the Toronto Eaton Centre, February 2009

Since 1996, Ramsay has written 26 books. Ramsay also contributes a food-and-drink column to The Times' Saturday magazine.

- Gordon Ramsay's Passion for Flavour (1996). ISBN 978-1850298410.
- Gordon Ramsay's Passion for Seafood (1999). ISBN 978-1850299936.
- Gordon Ramsay, a Chef for All Seasons (2000). ISBN 978-1580082341.
- Gordon Ramsay's Just Desserts (2001). ISBN 978-1571457011.
- Gordon Ramsay's Secrets (2003). ISBN 978-1844000371.
- Gordon Ramsay's Kitchen Heaven (2004). ISBN 978-0141017976.
- Gordon Ramsay Makes It Easy (2005). ISBN 978-0764598784.
- Gordon Ramsay Easy All Year Round (2006). ISBN 978-1844002801.
- Gordon Ramsay's Sunday Lunch and other recipes from The F Word (2006). ISBN 978-1844002801.
- Humble Pie (2006; autobiography). ISBN 978-0007270965 (issued in US as Roasting in Hell's Kitchen: Temper Tantrums, F Words, and the Pursuit of Perfection) (2006), ISBN 978-0061191985).
- Gordon Ramsay's Fast Food Recipes from The F Word (2007). ISBN 978-1844004539.
- Playing with Fire (2007; follow-up to autobiography). ISBN 0007259883.
- Recipes From a 3 Star Chef (2007). ISBN 978-1844005000.
- Gordon Ramsay's Three Star Chef (2008). ISBN 978-1554700905.
- Gordon Ramsay's Fast Food (2008). ISBN 978-1554700646.
- Gordon Ramsay's Healthy Appetite (2008). ISBN 978-1402797880.
- Cooking for Friends: Food from My Table (2008). ISBN 978-0061435041.
- Gordon Ramsay's World Kitchen: Recipes from "The F Word" (2009). ISBN 978-1554701995.
- Ramsay's Best Menus (2010). ISBN 978-1844009152.
- Gordon Ramsay's Great Escape: 100 of my favourite Indian recipes (2010). ISBN 978-0007267057.
- Gordon's Great Escape: 100 of my favourites South-east Asia recipes (2011). ISBN 978-0007267040.
- Gordon Ramsay's Ultimate Cookery Course (2012). ISBN 978-1444756692.
- Gordon Ramsay's Home Cooking: Everything You Need to Know to Make Fabulous Food (2013). ISBN 978-1455525256.
- Gordon Ramsay and the Bread Street Kitchen Team: Delicious Recipes for Breakfast, Lunch and Dinner to Cook at Home (2016). ISBN 978-1473651432.
- Gordon Ramsay's Ultimate Fit Food: Mouth-Watering Recipes to Fuel You for Life (2018). ISBN 978-1473652279.
- Gordon Ramsay: Quick and Delicious – 100 Recipes to Cook in 30 Minutes or Less (2019). ISBN 978-1529325430.
- Ramsay in 10: Delicious Recipes Made in a Flash (2021). ISBN 978-1529364385.
- Gordon Ramsay's Uncharted: A Culinary Adventure With 60 Recipes from Around the Globe (2023). ISBN 978-1426222702.
- Restaurant Gordon Ramsay: A Story of Excellence (2023). ISBN 978-1473652316 (co-written with Matt Abè).
- Idiot Sandwich: 100+ Recipes to Elevate Your Sandwich Game (2025). ISBN 978-0063436725.

Master Chefs Series

- Pasta Sauces (1996). ISBN 978-0297836315.
- Fish And Shellfish (1997). ISBN 978-0297822851.

Cook Cards

- Hot Dinners (2006). ISBN 978-1844003310.
- Cool Sweets (2006). ISBN 978-1844003327.
