= Best New Restaurant =

- Genre: Reality competition
- Based on: Ramsay's Best Restaurant
- Judges: Tom Colicchio; Maggie Nemser; Jeffrey Zurofsky
- Country of origin: United States
- Original language: English
- No. of seasons: 1
- No. of episodes: 11

Production
- Executive producers: Gordon Ramsay; Tom Colicchio; Elizabeth Cook; Nicola Moody; Pat Llewellyn; Ben Adler
- Running time: 42 minutes
- Production company: One Potato Two Potato

Original release
- Network: Bravo
- Release: January 21 – April 1, 2015

Best New Restaurant is an American reality competition series on Bravo that premiered on January 21, 2015. The show is based on British television series Ramsay's Best Restaurant created by celebrity chef Gordon Ramsay.

The show features a celebrity chef Tom Colicchio, along with Maggie Nemser and Jeffrey Zurofsky, who bring sixteen new restaurants against each other in a series of challenges in order to determine which one of them would be crowned as the best. The challenges include the dishes that are served, the restaurant's decor and the overall concept.

== Judges ==
- Tom Colicchio is a well-known celebrity chef. He has been the head judge on every season of Bravo reality television series Top Chef and also been serving as mentor to the competing chefs on the series, guiding them through their various challenges. On Best New Restaurant Colicchio will also act as host, judge, and executive producer.
- Maggie Nemser is the CEO and Editor-in-chief of Blackboard Eats, a food go-to site for perks and exclusive experiences at top restaurants as well as deals on artisanal foods and products.
- Jeffrey Zurofsky is an entrepreneur whose career started in the kitchen, eventually "trading in his apron for a business casual blazer." Jeff is also Colicchio's partner in ‘wichcraft, a sandwich shop business.

== Episodes ==
No.	Title	Original release date	U.S. viewers
1	"Italian Cuisine"	January 21, 2015	663,000
The first two participating newly opened restaurants compete in three challenges. Both restaurants serve Italian cuisine. The menu in Dolce Italian in South Beach is dedicated to serving authentic Italian dishes while the other restaurant Doma in Beverly Hills offer Italian food with a global twist. Winner: Dolce
2	"Shared Plates"	January 28, 2015	518,000
3	"New Service Concepts"	February 4, 2015	417,000
4	"Operated by Couples"	February 11, 2015	366,000
5	"Battle of the Burger"	February 18, 2015	363,000
6	"European Inspired"	February 25, 2015	305,000
7	"Fast Casual Dining"	March 4, 2015	227,000
8	"Seasonal Menus"	March 11, 2015	433,000
9	"Semifinal Round 1"	March 18, 2015	296,000
10	"Semifinal Round 2"	March 25, 2015	315,000
11	"Finale"	April 1, 2015	422,000

== Reception ==
The show has been very well received by critics. Christina Chaey of Bon Appétit accented that Best New Restaurant is different from other cooking shows because it does not focus entirely on food, but includes the quality of service and hospitality as well. Vicki Hyman of The Star-Ledger gave the show a B, praising the show's different approach to “reward the restaurant that consistently fulfills its mission, regardless of cuisine or price point,” also distinguishing judges’ personalities as "genuine, not pumped-up-for-the cameras.” Adam Smith of Boston Herald noted that even though the show seems similar to those that have come before it but also manages to stand out for not infilling the show with drama by saying that "the knives are used for cooking and not stabbing each other in the back."
