= Gordon Ramsay's Bank Balance =

British game show

- Also known as: Bank Balance
- Genre: Game show
- Created by: Fernando De Jesus; Tom Day; Sam Smaïl; Bronson Payne
- Presented by: Gordon Ramsay
- Theme music composer: Paul Farrer
- Country of origin: United Kingdom
- Original language: English
- No. of series: 1
- No. of episodes: 10

Production
- Executive producers: Gordon Ramsay; Sue Allison; Lisa Edwards; Sharon Powers
- Producer: Jennifer Stephenson
- Production location: BBC Studioworks
- Running time: 60 minutes
- Production company: Studio Ramsay

Original release
- Network: BBC One
- Release: 24 February – 14 March 2021

Gordon Ramsay's Bank Balance (also known as simply Bank Balance) is a British game show hosted by Gordon Ramsay, which aired on BBC One in February–March 2021.

On 29 August 2021, it was announced that Bank Balance has been axed by the BBC.

== Format ==
One pair of contestants attempts to win a jackpot of up to £100,000, by placing and balancing different-sized stacks of bars on a balancing board by answering a series of questions that have multiple correct answers. There are a total of 12 zones on the board and 12 stacks of bars that have to be placed in said zones. The 12 stacks consist of three triple stacks (worth £9,000 each), three quadruple stacks (worth £16,000 each), and one quintuple stack (worth £25,000). There are also two single stacks and three double stacks that act as 'balance bars' and have no monetary value. All stacks must be placed and balanced on the board for the contestants to win their bank balance. The zone that the bars are placed on each round are chosen at random by the contestants.

The 12 question topics are shown at the start and, after the contestants pick a category, the question will require them to give however many answers their stack consists of and place and balance them within 60 seconds. So for example, if the team is playing for a double stack, they have to give two answers and place their bars in time and so on. If the contestants give a wrong answer or run out of time, then the bars lose any value they had and are removed from the possible jackpot. They are still required to place any remaining bars onto the board, but have to also place an additional penalty bar on top of the stack, thus adding extra weight and increasing the chances of the bars toppling over.

The contestants also gain access to three credits as the game goes on, which can all be used once at any time when unlocked:

- Pick Again – unlocked after placing three stacks, this allows the contestants to pick the next zone again if they are unhappy with the zone they chose.
- Bank a Stack – unlocked after placing six stacks, this allows the contestants to nominate a stack that they would like to bank, which if they successfully place the stack, they win the value of the stack regardless of whether they complete the board or not. They must invoke the credit before playing the question, and the same rules as before apply if they give a wrong answer or run out of time.
- Extra Time – unlocked after placing nine stacks, this gives the contestants an additional 15 seconds to answer and stack the following question, giving them 75 seconds total.

The more bars they manage to balance, the more money they gain, but the more bars are placed, the board becomes more and more unstable and likely to fall. If any bar or stack falls during the game, then the game is over and the contestants lose all of the money they have gained (while keeping any money they had previously banked), but if they successfully place and balance all 12 stacks onto the board, then they win all the money that is still in play.

== Reception ==
Bank Balance received negative reviews, with critics considering its format to be confusing and too difficult to win (leading some viewers to compare it to Bamboozled, a fictitious game show pilot from an episode of the American sitcom Friends). In a review satirising Ramsay's persona, Joel Golby concluded for The Guardian: "if you want a quizshow, yeah, watch Tipping Point. If you want Gordon Ramsay, all right, watch that one where he shouts at Gino D'Acampo. If you want to watch people balancing things in a prison of mild peril, OK, there are Jenga fail compilations on YouTube. Bank Balance promises all three, and delivers none."

The series won a Broadcast Tech Innovation Award for Technical Achievement (Entertainment) for its illuminated bars.

== Transmissions ==
=== Series ===
Series	Start date	End date	Episodes
1	24 February 2021	13 March 2021	10
