= Gordon Ramsay: Uncharted Showdown =

- Genre: Reality competition; Culinary
- Presented by: Gordon Ramsay
- Country of origin: United Kingdom
- Original language: English

Production
- Camera setup: Multi-camera

Original release
- Network: National Geographic
- Release: 2022 – present

Gordon Ramsay: Uncharted Showdown is a reality television series that debuted in 2022.
