= Gordon Ramsay's Ultimate Fit Food =

Cookbook written by chef Gordon Ramsay

- Cover of the book
- Author: Gordon Ramsay
- Language: English
- Genre: Cookbook
- Publisher: Hodder & Stoughton General Division
- Publication date: 4 January 2018
- Publication place: London, United Kingdom
- Media type: Print (Hardback)
- ISBN: 978-1-4736-5227-9
- Website: Author website Publisher website

Gordon Ramsay's Ultimate Fit Food is a cookbook written by chef Gordon Ramsay, creator of Hell's Kitchen. The book is a collection of food recipes for the purpose of cooking and eating.

The book has three sections namely ′Healthy′, ′Lean recipes′ and ′Fit′, each consisting of breakfasts, lunches, suppers, sides and snacks' recipes with health-boosting benefits explained.

== See also ==
- Recipe
- Cookbook
- Diet food
- List of nutrition guides
