= Ramsay's Best Restaurant =

Television series

- Title card
- Starring: Gordon Ramsay
- Narrated by: Gordon Ramsay
- Country of origin: United Kingdom
- No. of seasons: 1
- No. of episodes: 9

Production
- Running time: 60 minutes (episodes 1–7); 130 minutes (episodes 8–9)
- Production companies: One Potato Two Potato in association with Optomen

Original release
- Network: Channel 4
- Release: 14 September – 9 November 2010

Ramsay's Best Restaurant is a television programme featuring British celebrity chef Gordon Ramsay broadcast on Channel 4. During the series restaurants from all over Britain competed in order to win the "Ramsay's Best Restaurant" title. The initial 16 restaurants were selected by Ramsay from a pool of some 12,000 entries submitted by Channel 4 viewers.

== Overview ==
In the first stage of the competition, eight pairs of restaurants representing the same type of cuisine were pitted against each other, with winners progressing to semi-finals, and then the final. Although originally announced as a 12-part series, the series had nine episodes aired between September and November 2010.

In the grand final broadcast on 9 November, the competition was won by Casamia, a Michelin-starred restaurant based in Bristol, with Prashad, an Indian Gujarati vegetarian restaurant from Bradford, finishing as runner-up.

== Format ==
In the elimination round, two restaurants are chosen from each category of cuisine and subjected to three tests:

- Thirty diners are brought to each restaurant, and all order their meals at once. Every guest needs to be served a complete menu in two hours for the task to be successfully completed.
- An undercover diner (either Simon Davis or Sarah Durdin-Robertson) is sent to each restaurant, to review the food and service. The undercover diner is intentionally difficult, to evaluate how the service staff and the kitchen respond to customers with out-of-the-ordinary demands and problems.
- The chefs from each restaurant prepare a dish using a main ingredient of Ramsay's choosing, and serve it to twenty guests, including their front of house staff and VIP guests, at the Restaurant Gordon Ramsay at Royal Hospital Road in Chelsea, London. Ramsay then samples the dish from the final challenge, and decides on the episode's winner.

In the quarter-finals, each team is evaluated by an undercover diner on the quality of their food and service; Ramsay eliminates four restaurants from the eight semifinalists after reviewing the undercover diner's findings.

In the semi-finals, Ramsay, Angela Hartnett, and Simon Davis stop by unexpectedly at each restaurant to enjoy a meal (in some cases, with a 90-minute time limit), evaluating each restaurant on service and food quality. He also recruits a second party of people to dine at the restaurant at the same time, to see if the service and food provided is the same for all customers. Each restaurant is then given restaurant space in North London, £2000, and a guided tour of Ramsay's favourite markets for fresh ingredients. They are tasked with decorating and operating a temporary "pop-up" restaurant for an evening, where guests pay what they feel the meal was worth. Ramsay eliminates two of the four semi-finalists on the experience and food of the pop-up restaurants.

In the finals, the two remaining restaurants cooked in Petrus, Ramsay's central London restaurant, for a variety of guests that include chefs and staff from previously-eliminated restaurants. They are tasked with producing a full three-course meal that demonstrates their passion for cooking while Angela Hartnett, Simon Davis, and Sarah Durdin-Robertson supervise them from the chef's table in the kitchen. Through sampling of the dishes from each course and consultation with his guests and the chef's table, Ramsay selects the winning restaurant.

== Episodes ==
WIN

| # | Original airdate | Viewers | Cuisine | Restaurants | Location | Website |
|---|---|---|---|---|---|---|
| 1. | 14 September 2010 | 1.85 million | Italian | Casamia | Bristol | casamiarestaurant.co.uk |
| 1. | 14 September 2010 | 1.85 million | Italian | Mennula | Fitzrovia, London | mennula.com |
| 2. | 21 September 2010 | 1.91 million | Indian | Prashad | Bradford | prashad.co.uk |
| 2. | 21 September 2010 | 1.91 million | Indian | Brilliant Restaurant | Southall, London | brilliantrestaurant.com |
| 3. | 28 September 2010 | 1.57 million | Chinese | Yu and You | Blackburn | yucopstergreen.co.uk |
| 3. | 28 September 2010 | 1.57 million | Chinese | Kai | Mayfair, London | kaimayfair.co.uk |
| 4. | 5 October 2010 | 1.54 million | British | The West House | Biddenden | thewesthouserestaurant.co.uk |
| 4. | 5 October 2010 | 1.54 million | British | The Milestone | Sheffield | the-milestone.co.uk |
| 5. | 12 October 2010 | 1.69 million | Thai | Mango Tree | Belgravia, London | mangotree.org.uk |
| 5. | 12 October 2010 | 1.69 million | Thai | Nahm Jim | St. Andrews | nahm-jim.co.uk |
| 6. | 19 October 2010 | N/A | French | La Garrigue | Edinburgh | lagarrigue.co.uk |
| 6. | 19 October 2010 | N/A | French | Winteringham Fields | Winteringham | winteringhamfields.co.uk |
| 7. | 26 October 2010 | N/A | North African | Azou | Hammersmith, London | azou.co.uk |
| 7. | 26 October 2010 | N/A | North African | Momo | Mayfair, London | momoresto.com |
| 8. | 2 November 2010 | N/A | Spanish | Fino | Fitzrovia, London | finorestaurant.com |
| 8. | 2 November 2010 | N/A | Spanish | El Pirata De Tapas | Notting Hill, London | elpiratadetapas.co.uk |

== Finals results ==
Winner

| Quarter-finals | Semi-finals | Finals |
|---|---|---|
| Casamia | Casamia | Casamia |
| Yu and You | Casamia | Casamia |
| Nahm Jim | Fino | Casamia |
| Fino | Fino | Casamia |
| Azou | The Milestone | Prashad |
| The Milestone | The Milestone | Prashad |
| Prashad | Prashad | Prashad |
| Winteringham Fields | Prashad | Prashad |

== International version ==
An American version of the show was produced in the United States under the name Best New Restaurant premiered on cable network Bravo from 21 January until 1 April 2015. The host was Tom Colicchio.

A Czech version of the show was produced in the Czech Republic under the name Pohlreichův souboj restaurací premiered on network TV Nova from 8 March until 3 May 2023. The host was Zdeněk Pohlreich.
