= Le Pressoir d'Argent =

- Interactive map of Le Pressoir d'Argent

Restaurant information
- Established: 2015; 11 years ago
- Owner: Gordon Ramsay
- Head chef: Gilad Peled
- Food type: French cuisine
- Dress code: Elegant casual
- Rating: Michelin Guide
- Location: Bordeaux, 33000, France
- Coordinates: 44.8422°N 0.5751°W
- Reservations: Yes
- Other information: Nearest station: Tram B - Grand Théâtre
- Website: Official website

Le Pressoir d'Argent (French pronunciation: [lə pʁɛ.swaʁ daʁ.ʒɑ̃], "The Silver Press") is a two Michelin star restaurant owned by British celebrity chef and restaurateur Gordon Ramsay located in Bordeaux, France. It opened in 2015 and is Ramsay's third restaurant in France.

== Description ==
Le Pressoir d'Argent is located on the first floor of the InterContinental Bordeaux Le Grand Hôtel in Bordeaux, France. Dishes served include "native lobster from the ‘press’ steamed with lemon leaf, corn, girolles, courgettes, coral and lemon grass bisque; and blonde d’ Aquitaine veal, braised shin, bone marrow, white root vegetables, soft herbs and consommé." The restaurant's menu was developed by Ramsay with head chef Gilad Peled.

== History ==
Le Pressoir d’Argent was opened in September 2015 and was Ramsay's third restaurant in France after the Trianon Palace and the Veranda in Versailles. It was awarded two Michelin stars in the 2016 list. As of 2024, it still held two Michelin stars.

== See also ==
- List of restaurants owned or operated by Gordon Ramsay
