= Tom Colicchio =

American celebrity chef (born 1962)

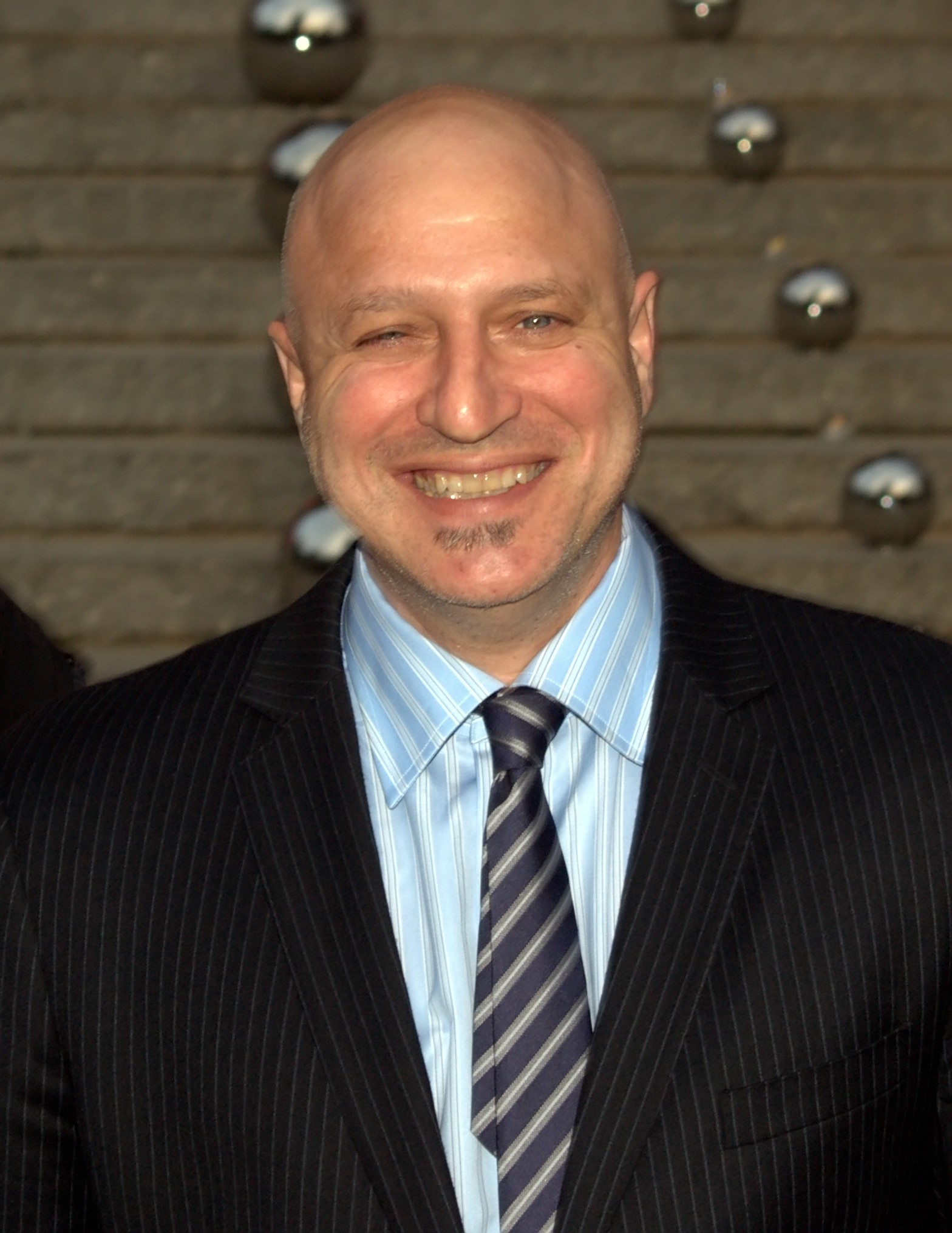
- Colicchio at the 2010 Tribeca Film Festival
- Born: Thomas Patrick Colicchio; 1962 (age 63–64); Elizabeth, New Jersey, U.S.
- Culinary career
- Current restaurants
- Craftsteak (Las Vegas); Small Batch (Garden City, NY); Temple Court (New York); 'wichcraft (New York); Vallata (New York)
- Previous restaurants
- Craft (New York City); Beachcraft (Miami Beach); Craft (Dallas); Craft (Los Angeles); Craft and Craftbar (Atlanta); Craftbar (New York City); Craftsteak (Foxwoods Resort Casino); Colicchio & Sons (New York City); Gramercy Tavern (New York City); Riverpark (New York); Tom Colicchio's Heritage Steak (Las Vegas); Topping Rose House (Bridgehampton); 'wichcraft (Las Vegas and San Francisco)
- Television show
- Top Chef
- Award
- Five James Beard Foundation Awards

Thomas Patrick Colicchio (/koʊˈliːkjoʊ/; born 1962) is an American celebrity chef. He co-founded the Gramercy Tavern in New York City, and formerly served as a co-owner and as the executive chef. He is also the founder of Crafted Hospitality, which includes Craft (NYC and Los Angeles), Temple Court (NYC), Craftsteak (MGM Grand Las Vegas) and Small Batch (Long Island) restaurants. Colicchio is the recipient of five James Beard Foundation Awards for cooking accomplishments.

He has been the head judge on every season of Bravo reality TV show Top Chef as well as Best New Restaurant which he also executive produces. Colicchio has also been a featured chef on Great Chefs shows.

== Early life ==
Colicchio was born in Elizabeth, New Jersey, the middle son of Beverly Ann (née Corvelli) and Thomas Patrick Colicchio. He has an older brother, Michael, and a younger brother, Philip John. His mother worked in a school lunchroom. His father was a union organizer. He is of Italian descent on both sides. He graduated in 1980 from Elizabeth High School.

== Career ==
Colicchio’s first job in New York was at The Quilted Giraffe, where he first worked as a line chef, then sous-chef. In the mid-1980s, Colicchio served as a sous-chef to Thomas Keller at Rakel in Manhattan. He also worked at Gotham Bar and Grill.

In July 1994, Colicchio and his partner Danny Meyer opened the Gramercy Tavern in the Gramercy Park neighborhood of Manhattan. It was voted Most Popular Restaurant in New York City by the Zagat Survey in 2003 and 2005. He sold his interest in 2006 and is no longer affiliated with the restaurant.

In spring 2001, he opened the first Craft restaurant one block south of Gramercy Tavern. A year later, he opened the first Craftsteak at the MGM Grand in Las Vegas. After the September 11 attacks, Colicchio served food to rescue workers at Ground Zero. In 2003, he began the first 'wichcraft, his sandwich shop.

In 2010, he opened Colicchio & Sons, and also Riverpark. Colicchio won the 2010 Outstanding Chef award from the James Beard Foundation.

In 2013, he, Jeff Bridges, and Raj Patel appeared in the documentary film A Place at the Table released in the U.S. on March 1, 2013. The movie was directed by his wife Lori Silverbush. He is also Executive Producer of A Place At The Table.

Colicchio serves on the Food Council at City Harvest and the Culinary Council at Food Bank for New York City, two hunger-relief organizations. Colicchio has long been involved in food supply chain, restaurant and hunger relief issues.

Colicchio has written three cookbooks.

=== Television ===
Colicchio has been involved with Top Chef since its beginning in 2006, where he has served as head judge. He is also the main consulting producer on Bravo's Top Chef spin-off series entitled Top Chef Masters. He also won an Emmy Award in 2010 for Outstanding Reality-Competition Programming as an executive producer of Top Chef, on which he appears.

Colicchio was the host of the reality series Best New Restaurant (an adaptation of the British reality show Ramsay's Best Restaurant) in 2015.

Colicchio appeared in the fifth episode of the first season of HBO's Treme as himself along with fellow chefs Eric Ripert, David Chang and Wylie Dufresne. He made another cameo in Season 2 alongside Ripert. In 2011, he made cameos in the Season 23 premiere episode of The Simpsons, "The Falcon and the D'ohman," and The Smurfs. Colicchio appeared as a chef in the fifth season of the Showtime TV series Billions, in the episode titled Liberty. (S5.E10)

=== Podcasting ===
In June 2020, Colicchio launched his podcast, "Citizen Chef" via the iHeartRadio Podcast Network. The seasonal series deals with issues of food, politics, policy and citizenship.

=== Restaurants ===
Craft

- New York City

Craftsteak

- Las Vegas

Small Batch

- Garden City, NY

Temple Court (formerly known as Fowler & Wells)

- New York City

'wichcraft

- New York City

==== Former restaurants ====
- Beachcraft, Miami Beach, closed
- Craft, Dallas, closed June 30, 2012
- Craft, Los Angeles, closed
- Craft and Craftbar, Atlanta, closed
- Craftbar, New York City, closed
- Craftsteak, MGM Grand at Foxwoods, closed
- Colicchio & Sons, New York City, closed
- Gramercy Tavern, New York City, no longer affiliated
- Riverpark, New York City, no longer affiliated
- Tom Colicchio's Heritage Steak, Las Vegas, The Mirage, no longer affiliated
- Topping Rose House, Bridgehampton, NY, no longer affiliated
- 'wichcraft, Las Vegas, closed
- 'wichcraft, San Francisco, closed

== Personal life ==
He has been married to filmmaker Lori Silverbush since 2001. He has three sons: Dante (born 1993), his child with an ex-girlfriend, and his two children with Silverbush, Luka Bodhi (born 2009) and Mateo Lev (born 2011).

== Books ==
- Colicchio, Tom; Young, Catherine; Silverbush, Lori; Fri, Sean (2000). Think like a chef. New York: Clarkson Potter/Publishers. ISBN 9780609604854.
- Colicchio, Tom; Young, Catherine; Bettencourt, Bill (2003). Craft of cooking : notes and recipes from a restaurant kitchen. New York: Clarkson Potter/Publishers. ISBN 9780609610503.
- Colicchio, Tom; Ortúzar, Sisha (2009). 'Wichcraft : craft a sandwich into a meal--and a meal into a sandwich. New York: Clarkson Potter/Publishers. ISBN 9780609610510.
