= Gordon's Great Escape =

- Genre: Food
- Starring: Gordon Ramsay
- Country of origin: United Kingdom
- No. of series: 2
- No. of episodes: 7

Production
- Production companies: One Potato Two Potato in association with Optomen

Original release
- Network: Channel 4
- Release: 18 January 2010 – 30 May 2011

Gordon's Great Escape is a television series presented by chef Gordon Ramsay.

Series 1 follows Ramsay's first visit to India, where he explores the country's culinary traditions. Produced by One Potato Two Potato, in association with Optomen, the series aired on three consecutive nights between 18 and 20 January 2010 as part of Channel 4's 'Indian Winter' promotion.

The second series aired in May 2011, where Ramsay explored the culinary traditions of Southeast Asia, visiting Thailand, Cambodia, Malaysia, and Vietnam.

== Background ==
Ramsay had taken an interest in Indian cuisine since his mother took him out for curry as a child. His mother also learned curry recipes from their Indian landlord in Birmingham. In 2009, he filmed the series in the midst of financial and personal problems back home. Ramsay stated, "It was me and a rucksack and a month of being on the road going back to what I love doing best — cooking...One minute I was all over the newspapers, the next I was on a continent where no one really knew who I was."

== Episodes ==
=== Season 1 (2010) ===
No. overall	No. in series	Title	Original release date
1	1	"Mangala Express"	18 January 2010
Ramsay cooks curry on board the Mangala Express train between New Delhi and Lucknow for 400 diners.
2	2	"Northeast India"	19 January 2010
Ramsay travels to north-east India, stops include hunting at Shiyong Village, Majuli Island and Guwahati; attends chili eating show and samples cooking from Nagaland to Assam, and then on to Kolkata, where he sets up shop among the street food stalls hoping to tempt the local foodies into buying his curry.
3	3	"Kerala"	20 January 2010
Ramsay visits an Ashram and learns to enjoy vegetarian food, later he travels to Kerala and takes part in a local race, and finally he heads back to Mumbai to put everything he has learned to the test as he cooks for a gathering of India's rich and glamorous.

=== Season 2 (2011) ===
No. overall	No. in series	Title	Original release date
4	1	"Cambodia"	9 May 2011
Gordon visits Cambodia, eating fried tarantula and preparing a traditional banquet for the royal family.
5	2	"Vietnam"	16 May 2011
Gordon's gastronomic tour of South East Asia brings him to Vietnam.
6	3	"Malaysia"	23 May 2011
Malaysia's food is a melting pot of influences, and Gordon has just a week to master the country's best known dishes.
7	4	"Thailand"	30 May 2011
Gordon Ramsay concludes his Asian tour in Thailand, where he learns to master some of the country's most delicious dishes, and dives for giant oysters in Krabi.
