= Gordon Ramsay: Chef Blast =

2021 video game

- Developer: Outplay Entertainment LTD.
- Platforms: Android; iOS
- Release: 2021
- Genre: Simulation
- Mode: Single-player

Gordon Ramsay: Chef Blast is a culinary puzzle game released in January 2021. The mobile app video game features voice work by chef Gordon Ramsay and was published in partnership with Outplay Entertainment.

== Gameplay ==
Chef Blast combines match-two puzzle mechanics with culinary elements. Players are tasked with finding and tapping matching cubes, which then explode, giving the player points. The more points a player accumulates the greater chance they have to become a top chef in Ramsey’s restaurant.

As you progress through the game, players earn the ability to customize their kitchen. Players can choose from cabinets, tile, cookware, and more to create their dream kitchen. The game's features include the ability to personalize the kitchen with various options like cabinets, countertops, and wallpaper.

As players advance, they gain access to recipes authored by Chef Ramsay, such as grilled fish tacos and buttermilk pancakes. Players also have a chance to learn different cooking techniques which also helps to earn points, progress through the levels of the game and get their name on the leaderboard. Players can work in teams to complete challenges and can also earn tools like hammers and knives to assist in solving puzzles.

The game is free to play and includes a competitive aspect with the "Genius League" tournament mode. The game is uploaded with new levels, recipes, and more each fortnight. A recipe book is also available to players and different challenges throughout the game unlock exclusive recipes.

Chef Blast also features voice-over from Gordon Ramsay.
