= La Noisette =

Coordinates: 51°29′55.4″N 0°9′33.5″W

- Interactive map of La Noisette

Restaurant information
- Rating: (Michelin Guide 2008)
- Location: London, England

La Noisette was a restaurant located at 164 Sloane Street in London, England.

== History ==
Opened in the mid-1990s as private members club Monte’s, the kitchen was operated by a series of star chefs including multi-Michelin-starred chef Alain Ducasse, and in 2000 Jamie Oliver was appointed as chef-consultant, overseeing head chef Ben O’Donoghue.

In 2005, Gordon Ramsay Holdings approached Ian Pengelley, who opened Pengelley's on the site in 2005, which closed after a year. In 2007, GRH reopened the site as La Noisette, with chef patron Bjorn van der Horst in charge. Under his charge, the restaurant held a one star in the Michelin Guide.

== Future ==
After closing in March 2009 as a restaurant, in light of the loss of private-dining capacity while the Savoy Hotel was closed due to refurbishment, GRH proposed to refurbish the site as a private dining venue.
