= Guga Foods =

Brazilian-American chef and YouTuber

- Born: Gustavo Tosta; July 27, 1980 (age 46); Uberaba, Minas Gerais, Brazil
- Years active: 2015–present

YouTube information
- Channels: Guga Foods; Sous Vide Everything; Guga
- Genre: Cooking
- Subscribers: 5.50 million (main channel); 2.11 million (Sous Vide Everything); 3.31 million (Guga)
- Views: 1.11 billion (main channel); 430 million (Sous Vide Everything); 1.51 billion (Guga)
- Last updated: February 27, 2026
- Website: gugafoods.com

Gustavo Tosta (born July 27, 1980), also known as Guga, is a Brazilian-American self-taught home cook and YouTuber. He is known for his experiments involving dry-aging foods and combining unconventional recipes.

== Early life ==
Gustavo Tosta was born on July 27, 1980, in Uberaba, Minas Gerais, Brazil. When he was still young, he immigrated to the United States with his family, settling in Redland, Florida.

== Career ==
Before becoming a YouTuber, Gustavo owned a web design agency, in which he treated his workers to Brazilian steakhouse restaurants multiple times a week. To save money, he began to cook the steak himself. Once, he had one of his friends record him using the sous vide technique and post the video online. The video gained views and led Guga to realize that there is interest in him cooking, leading him to begin posting more.

Guga Foods, originally called Easy Foods, was Guga's original channel, on which he scarcely uploaded. He eventually pivoted to Sous Vide Everything, noticing the larger audience there. After reaching 100,000 subscribers on Sous Vide, Guga's nephew Angel wanted to join the channel. He decided that Angel could join the channel if they both made videos on Guga Foods, which they would change to focus on food experiments. Guga Foods eventually surpassed Sous Vide in popularity as it was more accessible to a general audience. His third channel, Guga, serves as a combination of a YouTube Shorts channel and a side channel more casual videos.

In 2021, Guga signed with Night. This followed a viral video in which Guga covered an A5 Wagyu steak in Nutella, sparking a reaction from Gordon Ramsay. He released a cook book titled Guga: Breaking the Barbecue Rules, in April 2023.

== Personal life ==
Guga is private about his personal life, but has mentioned that he has a wife and three children.

Guga originally wanted to become a taekwondo master and instructor, even owning a martial arts studio at one point. He had to end his career due to an unspecified serious injury.
