= Gordon Ramsay: Cookalong Live =

British cooking show

- Genre: Cooking show
- Starring: Gordon Ramsay
- Opening theme: "Pump It" by The Black Eyed Peas
- Country of origin: United Kingdom
- No. of series: 2
- No. of episodes: 8

Production
- Production locations: Stage 15, 3 Mills Studios
- Running time: 60 minutes

Original release
- Network: Channel 4
- Release: 24 October 2008 – 25 December 2012

Gordon Ramsay: Cookalong Live is a British cooking show starring Gordon Ramsay. Originally conceived as a one-off episode, Channel 4 later commissioned a full series for late 2008. A Christmas special aired on 25 December 2011 and a second on 25 December 2012.

== Background ==
The original episode was part of The Big Food Fight, a January 2008 promotion featuring Channel 4 shows starring Jamie Oliver, Hugh Fearnley-Whittingstall and Gordon Ramsay. On live television, Ramsay invited the entire nation to prepare a three course meal for four with him in just under 60 minutes Ingredients and instructions were available on the official site to help viewers prepare for the event at home. Often, he would teach viewers basic cooking techniques, such as chopping an onion or boning a chicken.

The show was expanded to a seven-episode series for autumn 2008, and began on 24 October 2008. Each week Ramsay prepared a themed menu ranging from curry night to a 1970s theme, and even participated in a challenge with that episode's celebrity guest in cooking a dish chosen by the celebrity.

== Episodes ==
No.	Celebrity sous chef	Notes	Original release date	Ref
1	Patsy Kensit	Warm goat's cheese salad, salmon en croute, rhubarb and ginger crumble	24 October 2008	
2	Johnny Vegas	Theme: credit crunch-proof meal for under a tenner	31 October 2008	
3	Amanda Holden	Angel hair pasta with crab, duck breast with a port and cherry sauce, Quick tiramisu	7 November 2008	
4	Kirstie Allsopp	Theme: 70's Night: Prawn cocktail, steak Diane with peas and sauteed potatoes, mandarin cheesecake	21 November 2008	
5	James Corden	Theme: Chinese - sour prawn soup, stir-fried beef with peppers and egg noodles, hot bananas	28 November 2008	
6	Alan Carr	Theme: Curry night	5 December 2008	
7	Gok Wan	Theme: Christmas dinner. Torchwood's Naoko Mori makes an appearance as one of the guests Gok is cooking for.	12 December 2008	

== Christmas specials ==
A Christmas special aired live on 25 December 2011. It saw Ramsay making a Christmas lunch at his own home in Battersea. Guests included David Hasselhoff, Russell Grant, Jermain Defoe and Dynamo. Another special was aired the following Christmas.

2011 Menu:

Starter

Smoked salmon parcels with fennel and apple salad

Main course

Roast turkey with herb butter

Chestnut, pistachio, sage, sausage and apricot stuffing

Apple and sherry gravy

Spiced and honey glazed carrots and parsnips

Brussels sprouts with bacon and chilli

Perfect goose fat roast potatoes

Bacon wrapped cocktail sausages

Dessert

Christmas trifle

== International versions ==
An American version of the same name, also hosted by Ramsay, aired as a one-hour special on the Fox network on 15 December 2009. Guests included Whoopi Goldberg, Cedric the Entertainer, Alyson Hannigan and LeAnn Rimes, with home cooks featured live via Skype. The three course meal shown on the American premiere was identical to episode 3 of the original British series.

In September 2008, an Australian version was announced for airing on the Nine Network, also hosted by Ramsay. However it never eventuated.

Optomen and One Potato Two Potato licensed the Cookalong format for Swedish television. Tina's Cookalong starring Tina Nordström premiered in September 2009, with Ramsay appearing as a guest.

A Spanish version titled Cocina conmigo was announced to premier on Nova on 24 February 2013, hosted by Rodrigo de la Calle.

A Bulgarian version hosted by Silvena Rowe has aired on bTV since September 2013.
