= Gordon Behind Bars =

2012 British television series

- Directed by: Helen Simpson
- Starring: Gordon Ramsay
- Country of origin: United Kingdom
- No. of seasons: 1
- No. of episodes: 4

Production
- Executive producers: Tim Whitwell, Sue Murphy
- Producers: Jaemie Gallie, Vari Innes
- Running time: 60 minutes
- Production companies: One Potato Two Potato (An all3media Limited Company)

Original release
- Network: Channel 4
- Release: 26 June – 17 July 2012

Gordon Behind Bars is a British television series in which Gordon Ramsay teaches inmates of Brixton prison how to cook. It was broadcast in four episodes from 26 June – 17 July 2012 on Channel 4.

== Premise ==
Ramsay, a Michelin Star Chef in the UK, enters Brixton prison over a six-month period (December 2011 to June 2012) with the goal of teaching inmates how to cook and run a sustainable business selling goods prepared inside the prison to the general public.

== Bad Boys' Bakery ==
After some training from Ramsay, the inmate cooks of Brixton prison are formed into a business dubbed "Bad Boys' Bakery", under the slogan "Life Changing Taste", selling a Ramsay version of a lemon treacle tart (later changed to a lemon treacle slice). Eventually, Ramsay was able to negotiate an agreement for a trial order of 100 bars (per location) to be sold in 11 Caffè Nero locations across South London. As of September 2017, the tarts remain available at 15 outlets, while there are plans to expand to 190 locations throughout London.

== The cooks ==
Of the twelve cooks originally chosen to take part, five had left the program by the end of the series. In the fourth episode, five additional inmates were recruited to replace them, and five more were recruited after Ramsay had left.

=== Original twelve cooks ===
Inmate Cook	Conviction	Sentence	Location	Notes
Anthony Kelly	Commercial burglary, dangerous driving	30 Months	G Wing	Released and works for the St Giles Trust which works with ex-offenders to help rehabilitate them. He also became a stage-actor-trainee.
Andrew Insley	Burglary	20 Months	A Wing	Released and acquired a job at London restaurant Roast
Tesfa Jones	Robbery, attempted burglary	3 Years	G Wing	Released and given a successful tryout at Ramsay's Savoy
Paul Wyatt	Burglary	8 Months	A Wing	Released and given a successful tryout at Ramsay's Savoy restaurant, but was revealed to have lost the job due to a relapse into drugs
Adonis McQuitta	Possession of a firearm and cartridges without a license	4 Years	G Wing	Released
Daniel Guwaza	Theft	9 Months	A Wing	
Hassan Nour	Burglary	30 Months	A Wing	
David Jones	Burglary	40 Months	A Wing	
Inmate Cook #12 ("B")				The face of one of the original 12 cooks was obscured throughout the run of the series and no details were given about him on screen. Ramsay referred to him as "B".
Jerome Samuels	Burglary, actual bodily harm	16 Months	A Wing	Pulled off the program after he was charged with verbally abusing a female officer, he was later transferred to HM Prison Wayland
Rene Smith	Burglary	4 Years	A Wing	Ramsay asked him to leave the program after a confrontation with Ramsay's assistant Gee Charman
Lawrence Gibbons	Actual bodily harm	18 Months		Ramsay asked him to leave the program after a confrontation with fellow cook Rene Smith

== UK ratings ==
Episode	Airdate	Channel	Share	Viewers
1	26 June 2012	Channel 4 & Channel 4 +1	13%	3,000,000
2	3 July 2012	Channel 4 & Channel 4 +1	13.2%	2,891,000
3	10 July 2012	Channel 4 & Channel 4 +1		2,365,000
4	17 July 2012	Channel 4 & Channel 4 +1		2,158,000

== Safety issues ==
During filming of the program, there were incidents where fights would break out. Ramsay has stated "I was standing close by one bloke with another opposite me, and then this guy lunged over and went to headbutt him. I had to sort it out." Ramsay's wife was also concerned about his safety and instructed him to take self-defence classes.

== American version ==
Ramsay personally pitched the idea of an American version to Kevin Reilly at Fox Broadcasting; however, Reilly declined, saying, "We have a lot of Gordon on the air right now."
