= Max the Meat Guy =

American YouTuber and chef (born 1992)

- Born: Max Greb; September 27, 1992 (age 34); Boston, Massachusetts
- Years active: 2020–present
- Height: 1.86 m (6 ft 1 in)

Instagram information
- Page: MaxTheMeatGuy
- Followers: 2.3 million

TikTok information
- Page: Max The Meat Guy
- Followers: 6.2 million

YouTube information
- Channel: Max the Meat Guy
- Genre: Cooking
- Subscribers: 10 million
- Views: 6.44 billion
- Last updated: March 3, 2026
- Website: www.maxthemeatguy.com

Max Greb (born September 27, 1992), known online as Max the Meat Guy, is an American YouTuber and cook known for his videos on steaks and fillets. He launched his own jerky company, MaxJerky, in 2023.

== Early life ==
Max Greb was born on September 27, 1992, in Boston, Massachusetts. He began grilling at the age of six.

== Career ==
In 2014, Greb and his best friend Kyle Krasker enrolled in a study abroad program in Beijing, China. They wanted to open up a jerky market in the country after noticing the lack of options and quality there. After their graduation in 2015, the duo, alongside Greb's brother Tommy, started a financial services company in Shanghai, practicing their jerky cooking on the side.

The jerky business, dubbed MaxJerky, began to sell their jerky locally; they eventually found a production facility in 2018. Before the official launch of the jerky in 2019, Greb went back to the United States to visit his mother, who was sick. The COVID-19 pandemic struck during his time back, however, and he was unable to return to China. During the pandemic, Greb began posting videos of his cooking online, gaining success on social media. His sister, Sophia, quit her job to help his channel grow. In January 2022, Krasker, in China during the pandemic, returned to the U.S. to finish graduate school, helping relaunch MaxJerky in the American market with Max and Sophia. The product was able to release in 2023.

In 2022, Greb worked with Silver Fern Farms on its brand campaign Delicious Starts Here, which had him search for the reason the farms produced quality meat. In 2024, he collaborated with McCormick & Company to release a line of seasoning mixes. In August 2026, Greb co-founded the taco kit company Island Tacos.
