= Ahmad Alzahabi =

Syrian-American cook and social media personality (born 1997)

- Born: Ahmad Alzahabi; February 1, 1997 (age 29); Detroit, Michigan
- Education: Kettering University; University of Michigan–Flint
- Years active: 2019–present

Instagram information
- Page: Ahmad Alzahabi
- Followers: 4.7 million

TikTok information
- Page: The Golden Balance
- Followers: 8.6 million

YouTube information
- Channel: The Golden Balance
- Genre: Cooking
- Subscribers: 3.58 million
- Views: 1.65 billion
- Last updated: October 8, 2026
- Website: www.thegoldenbalance.com

Ahmad Alzahabi (born February 1, 1997), also known as The Golden Balance, is a Syrian-American chef and social media personality. He became known online through his series of recipes to make during Ramadan.

== Early life ==
Ahmad Alzahabi was born on February 1, 1997, in Detroit, Michigan, to Syrian immigrant parents. He later moved to Flint, where he grew up. As a child, he frequently helped his mother out in the kitchen and began cooking for himself after his parents moved to Dubai in 2017. After graduating from Carman-Ainsworth High School, he attended Kettering University, where his father worked, and the University of Michigan–Flint where he received a business degree in entrepreneurial innovation. While studying at the University of Michigan in 2017, Alzahabi took a month-long internship working in Dubai at a four-star Swiss hotel, helping out with food prep.

== Career ==
After graduating from college, Alzahabi worked at the nonprofit 100K Ideas. He had wanted to start a YouTube channel since 2017, wanting to educate others on his Muslim faith and on how to cook. He began making videos as The Golden Balance, as his last name, Alzahabi, translates to "the golden," on TikTok in 2019 and expanded to other platforms after gaining popularity in 2020. On the annual series, "The Ramadan Chronicles," Alzahabi makes protein-heavy meals both containing and excluding meat. Most of the recipes that he makes are relatively simple and come from the traditions of various cultures, such as Middle Eastern, Indian, and Italian.

In 2022, Alzahabi appeared on and won $10,000 for charity on a social media personality-centered episode of Chopped in its 53rd season. He gave his winnings to the Sylvester Broome Empowerment Village, a community center in Flint. In February 2026, Alzahabi opened an eatery in the Flint Farmers' Market called Golden Boy's.

== Personal life ==
Alzahabi is Muslim and has been outspoken against Islamophobia, especially in the United States. He is known for always saying "Basmala" before eating and aims to educate people about his culture through food.
