= West Kent College (2014) =

North Kent College (West Kent & Ashford College)

Location
- Tonbridge, Kent; England; 51°11′12″N 0°15′47″E

Information
- Type: Further Education, Higher Education
- Established: 1 August 2014
- Local authority: Kent County Council
- Department for Education URN: 130727 Tables
- Principal: David Gleed
- Gender: Mixed
- Age: 16 to 99
- Enrollment: 2,600
- Website: westkent.ac.uk

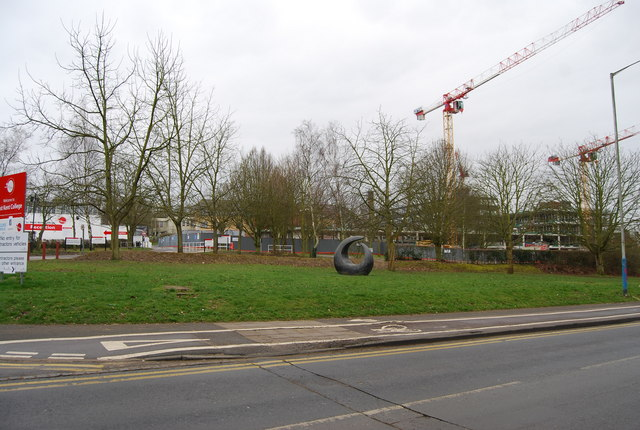
The Tonbridge campus was redeveloped in the 2000s.

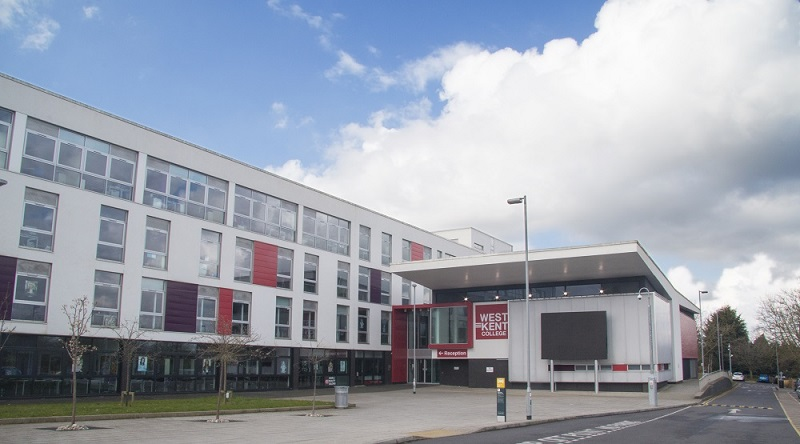
West Kent College, front entrance, spring 2016

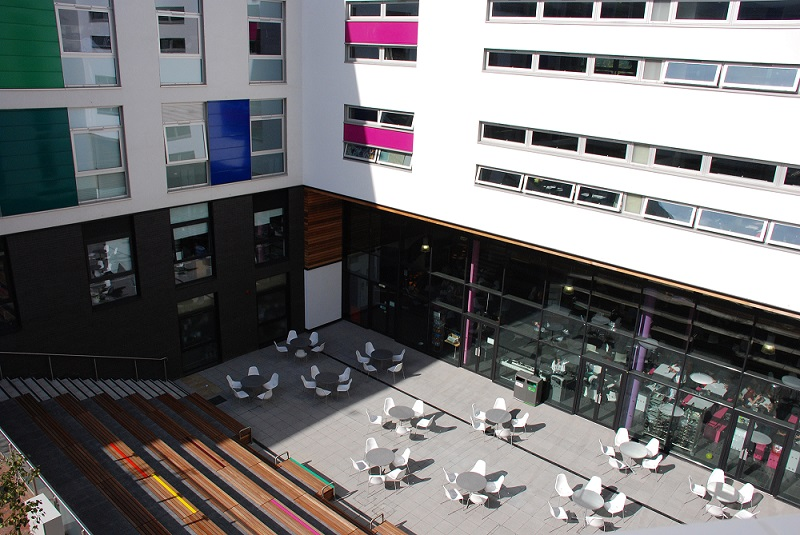
West Kent College, outdoor area

North Kent College is a further education and higher education college in Kent, England, founded in 2014. Its campus in Tonbridge offers numerous courses and qualifications at many levels, from GCSEs and A-levels to vocational routes such as BTEC or NVQ/VRQ Diplomas to work-based apprenticeships and degree programmes, validated by the University of Kent, University of Greenwich and Canterbury Christ Church University.

The College's facilities include a 300-seat theatre, studios and darkrooms for fine art, fashion, graphic design, and photography, television and radio studios, music recording studios, professional training and demo kitchens, as well as purpose-built motor vehicle engineering and construction workshops.

== History ==
The original West Kent College operated in Tonbridge, Tunbridge Wells, Crowborough, and Sevenoaks. The Tonbridge campus was redeveloped in the 2000s, while the Crowborough and Sevenoaks campuses closed in 2006.

It merged into K College in 2010. K College operated across 6 campuses, at Jemmett Road and Henwood in Ashford, Dover, Folkestone, Tonbridge and Royal Tunbridge Wells.

It was subsequently split in 2014, after sustaining a large amount of debt. It was split into two units from 1 August that year:

- Hadlow College Group took over the Tonbridge and Tunbridge Wells campuses as "West Kent College" and Ashford campus as "Ashford College"
- East Kent College took over Folkestone and Dover.

On 17 May 2019, Hadlow College become the first in the country to go into educational administration. That same year, following a review by the Further Education Commissioner, it was recommended that the Hadlow College Group be split up and taken on by three colleges: North Kent College, East Kent College Group and Capel Manor College.

On 15 August 2020, the education-related facilities of West Kent College and Hadlow College, including Princess Christian’s Farm and Hadlow College's equestrian centre in Greenwich, transferred to North Kent College.

== Courses ==
The college offers a range of Foundation, Extended and BTEC Diplomas, A Levels, Higher Education programmes and NVQs, in subjects such as:

- Electronic Engineering
- Catering and Hospitality
- Construction: Bricklaying, Electrical Installation, Carpentry and Joinery, Plumbing
- Performing Arts, Music, Media and Photography
- Art and Design, Graphic Design, Fashion and Clothing
- Motor Vehicle Engineering
- Information Technology
- Beauty Therapy, Hair Design
- Early Years and Health and Social Care
- Business and Admin
- Applied Science (including Forensic Science Pathway)
- Sport
- Travel and Tourism
- ESOL

== Notable alumni ==
- Marcus Dillistone Royal premiered film director and Music Producer Athens 2004 Olympic Ceremonies.
- Jonathan Shaw (politician), British Labour Party politician who was the Member of Parliament (MP) for Chatham and Aylesford, now CEO of Policy Connect
- Mark Sargeant, Michelin starred chef and restaurateur
- Ron Thornton, Emmy-winning visual effects designer, supervisor, producer and co-founder of Foundation Imaging, whose work featured in Doctor Who, various Star Trek series, Blakes 7, Babylon 5, Buffy the Vampire Slayer and films including Real Genius, Commando (1985 film), Critters (film), Robot Jox and Spaceballs
- James Tanner, chef
- Jake West, film director
- Mo Abudu, talk show host and media proprietor
- Sophie, Duchess of Edinburgh
- Jilly Goolden, wine critic, journalist and presenter
- Tim Garland, jazz saxophonist who has collaborated with Chick Corea and Bill Bruford
- Hazel Crowney, actress, model
- Nicki French, singer, actress
- Jake Hill, racing driver
- Robert Smith, racing driver
