= Gordon Ramsay at Claridge's =

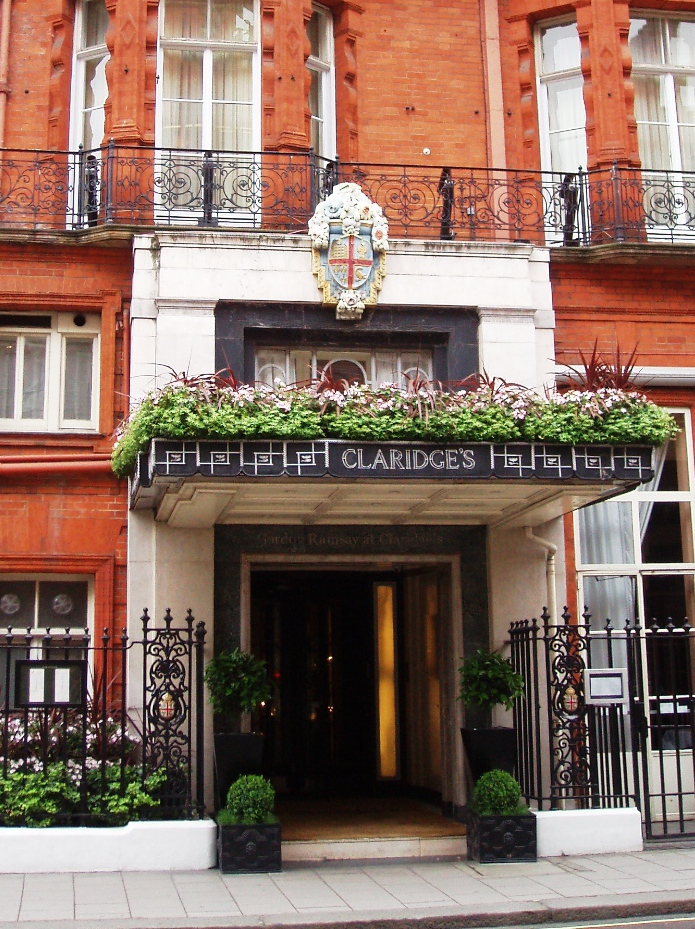
- The entrance to Gordon Ramsay at Claridge's, photographed in 2008

- The location of Claridge's within London

Restaurant information
- Established: 2001; 25 years ago
- Closed: 30 June 2013; 13 years ago
- Head chef: Mark Sargeant (2001–08); Steve Allen (2008–13)
- Chef: Gordon Ramsay, Steve Allen, Mark Sargeant, Mark Askew
- Food type: European cuisine
- Rating: Michelin star (2002–09)
- Location: Claridge's; Brook Street, London, W1, United Kingdom
- Coordinates: 51°30′45″N 0°08′51.36″W

Gordon Ramsay at Claridge's was a restaurant owned by Gordon Ramsay and located with Claridge's hotel in Mayfair, London. Blackstone Group had enquired about Ramsay's availability to open a restaurant after he was awarded three Michelin Stars at Restaurant Gordon Ramsay. It marked the first of a number of restaurants that Ramsay would open at hotels owned by Blackstone. It opened in 2001, and by the fourth year was making a profit of £2 million a year. Mark Sargeant was the chef de cuisine of the restaurant until 2008, during which time the restaurant was awarded a Michelin star.

The initial contract was for ten years, and after it was extended for three further short periods, Ramsay withdrew from negotiations with the new owners of the hotel and closed the restaurant at the end of the lease on 30 June 2013. It was positively reviewed by critics upon its launch, although work was required by staff to reduce the numbers of complaints it received from diners. Whilst some restaurant guides such as Zagat gave the restaurant positive reviews, Harden's did not. Both Sargeant and his successor Steve Allen won awards for cheffing when they worked at the restaurant.

== History ==
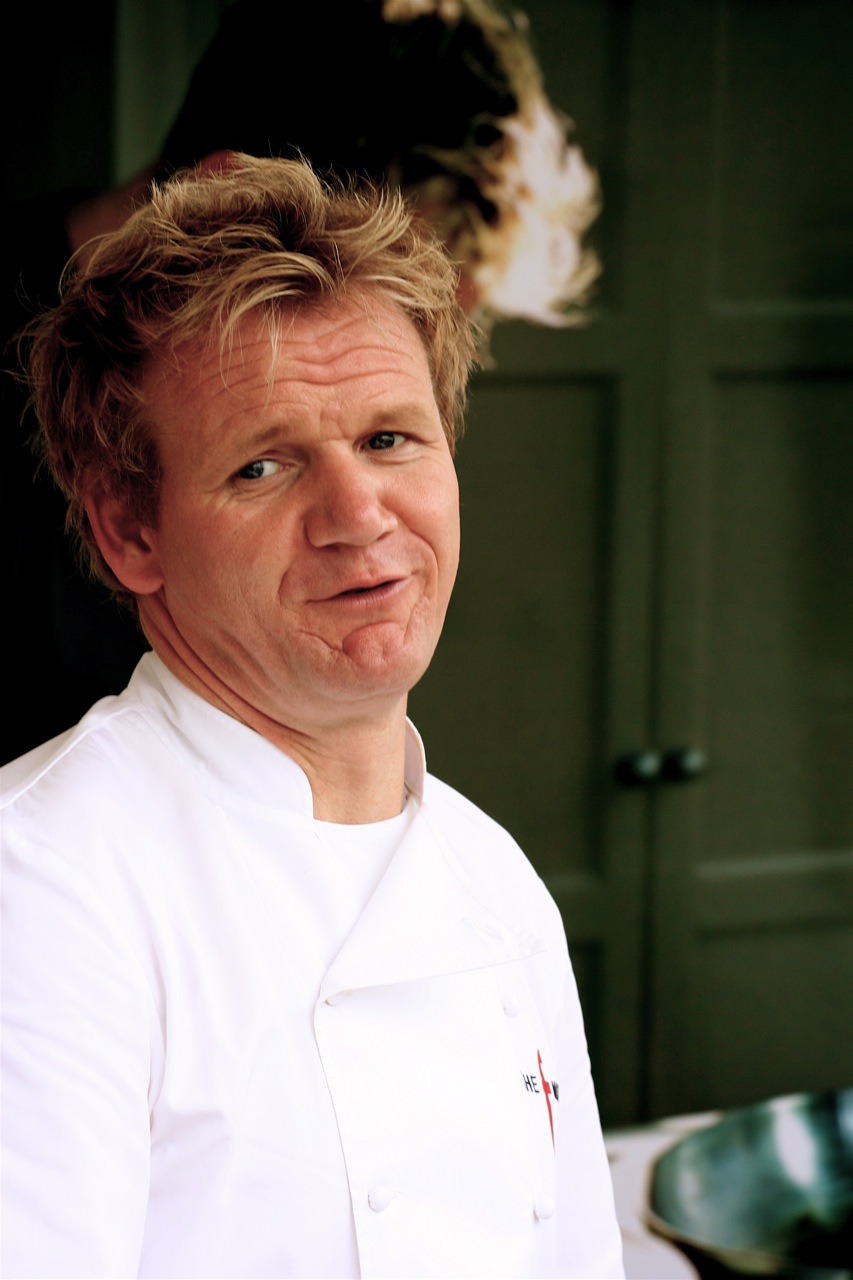
Gordon Ramsay had previously won three Michelin stars at Restaurant Gordon Ramsay

Following the awarding of a third Michelin star to Gordon Ramsay for Restaurant Gordon Ramsay, he was contacted by Blackstone Group who had recently acquired the Claridge's hotel in London. The negotiations for the lease of the restaurant were held between Ramsay's father-in-law, Chris Hutchinson, and John Ceriale from Blackstone. Ramsay was not the first choice for the restaurant, and Blackstone had been requiring whoever took on the restaurant to serve breakfast. All previous applicants had refused, but Hutchinson agreed without checking with Ramsay. This decision was something that Ramsay was later pleased with as the cooperative working between Gordon Ramsay Holdings and Blackstone Group resulted in over £1 billion of takings in the following years for Ramsay's restaurants in hotels owned by the group. Ceriale and colleagues were invited to the Restaurant Gordon Ramsay at Royal Hospital Road to meet Ramsay for the first time, and noticed a member of staff who had previously been working at Claridge's. Ramsay managed to smooth over the incident and an arrangement was reached. Blackstone agreed to fund the refit of the restaurant in return for 11% of the turnover as rent.

Ramsay and his team were allowed to lead on the redesign of the kitchen. It had previously been broken into multiple small rooms for staff use, which were opened up into larger rooms. A chef's table was installed, where diners could sit within the kitchen itself. This was the first time one had been installed in one of Ramsay's restaurants. That table earned over £500,000 a year alone. The opening was delayed by three months due to the ongoing building works, which gave additional time for the refit of the restaurant itself and for the transfer of 80 staff from the previous operation to go forward under the Transfer of Undertakings (Protection of Employment) Regulations 2006. Thierry Despont was hired to design the interior of the restaurant.

Mark Sargeant was chosen to be chef de cuisine. Sargeant had previously worked with Ramsay since being employed at Aubergine in 1998, and went on to work at Restaurant Gordon Ramsay. The restaurant hosted a red carpet-style opening party for 500 guests, with horse-driven Hackney carriages hired to sit outside the hotel to make it seem like when Claridge's was originally built. During the first two years, the profits were limited to £600,000, but rose to £2 million after the fourth year. The profits were increased by looking at purchasing ingredients on a seasonal basis and changing the menu to suit rather than buying more expensive products off season and having a static menu.

Mark Sargeant was chef de cuisine at the restaurant for 8 years.

Ian Waddle joined the restaurant as a demi chef de partie after being spotted by Ramsay during the production of his television show Ramsay's Kitchen Nightmares. But he quit after three weeks after being dissatisfied with the long hours required. The restaurant was used to host a prepared segment for the final episode of season three of Ramsay's Channel 4 British television series The F Word. In 2009, Sargeant quit to become creative director for intellectual property for Gordon Ramsay Holdings. He quit the company later that year to become the creative director of the Swan Collection, whose properties included The Swan at the Globe Theatre.

After being open in the location for over 10 years, the contract with the hotel came up for renegotiation in 2011. The contract negotiation was lengthy, causing Ramsay to withdraw. He had already been given two six-month and one nine-month extensions to the contract. The contract between Gordon Ramsay and Claridge's ended on 30 June 2013. There was a list of statistics published by Gordon Ramsay Holdings which showed the quantities of food served over the lifetime of the restaurant. Lobster ravioli was served more than 198,000 times, while Beef wellington was the most popular main course, having been served over 300,000 times. The most expensive bill at the restaurant was £48,000, and the most expensive wine was a 1900 vintage of Château Lafite Rothschild which sold for £10,000.

=== Menu ===
A voluntary donation of £1 was added to each bill during November and December for a London-based charity called StreetSmart. The success of the scheme resulted in Ramsay rolling it out to five further restaurants, resulting in around £23,000 a year being collected. Bluefin tuna had been served at the restaurant, but was removed from the menu in 2007 and replaced with Yellowfin tuna due to concerns about overfishing and the depletion of fish stocks.

== Reception ==
During the early years of operation, the restaurant was known for being heavily booked. Waits for tables could be up to six weeks. However, a spot check for availability by The Daily Telegraph in 2009 showed that there were multiple tables on three days during the following week. However, they were receiving around 16 letters of complaint a week during the first year. A weekly meeting was set up amongst the restaurant's staff to discuss the issues raised, and slowly the complaints reduced.

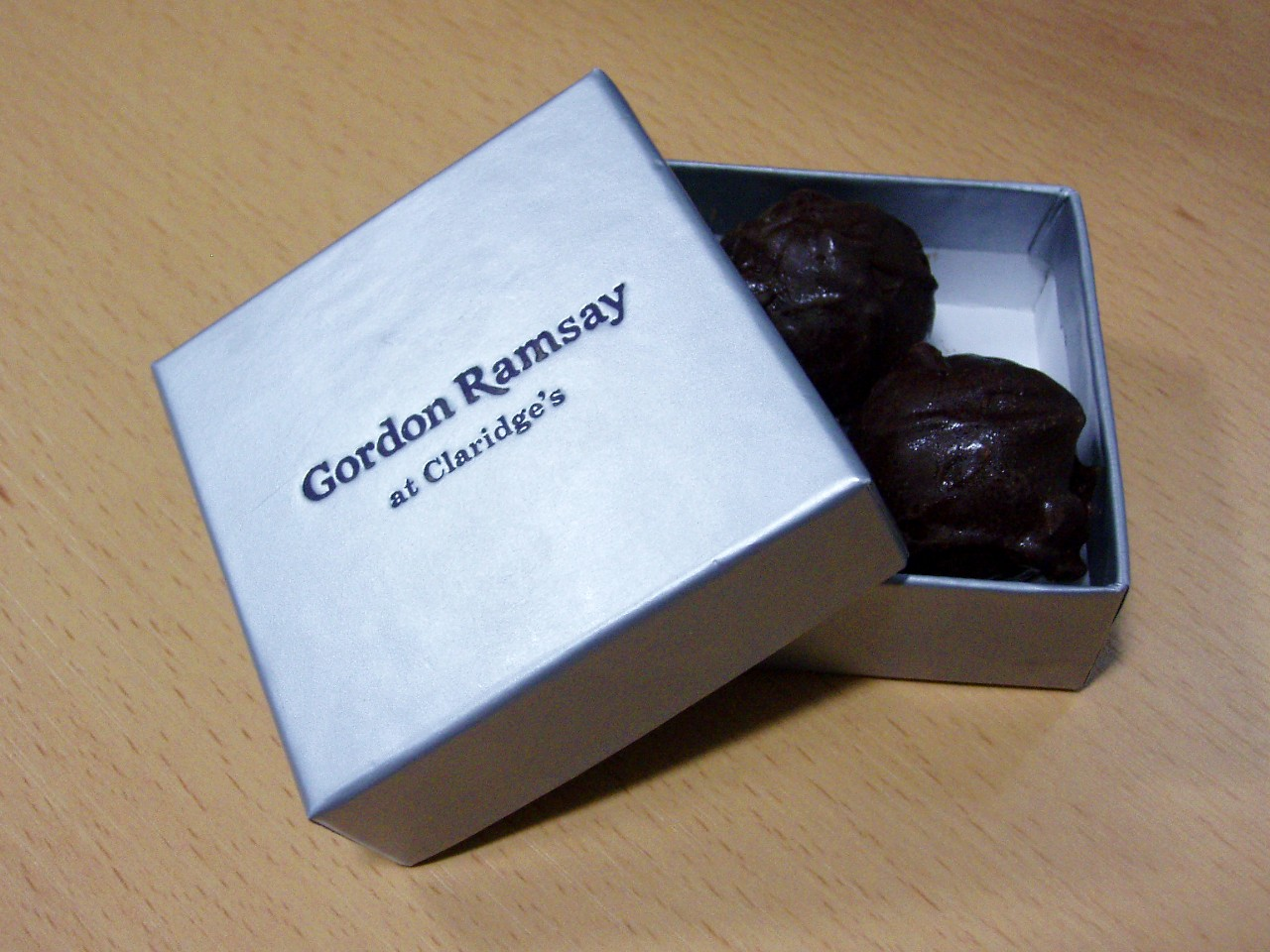
Ginger chocolate balls, some of the petit fours at the restaurant

Jan Moir, writing for The Daily Telegraph shortly after the restaurant opened, loved the interior and described the pigeon carpaccio as "amazing". She enjoyed her other courses, and praised the service. She described it overall as "a good-hearted operation; one which is also generous, opulent and comes with grown-up cooking and supremely delicious food." Fay Maschler also visited the restaurant in 2001, and reviewed it for the Evening Standard. She described a squash soup with ceps as "exquisite", and said that a main course of sea bass was "fabulous". She was happy at the low prices set during the opening, but expected that they wouldn't last.

In 2007, Harper's Bazaar described the restaurant as "Gordon's most appealing showcase". The review from Time Out in 2012 gave the restaurant three out of five, praising an "accomplished service team" and said that the "kitchen produces food with confidence and flair". Tatler described the service of the restaurant as "duff" in 2008. During the same year, it was voted as the 35th best restaurant in Britain by Eat Out magazine.

The Zagat restaurant guide gave the restaurant a score of 26 out of 30 for each category of food, decor and service. Comments included a description of the restaurant as a "brilliant culinary experience" and although the cost was said to be "exorbitant", the fixed price menu was called a bargain. In 2010, the guide ranked Gordon Ramsay at Claridge's as the third most popular. The restaurant regularly received negative reviews from Harden's restaurant guide. During a 2003 review, the restaurant was said to be "still living off Ramsay's reputation" and referred to it as a "glorified chain". In 2011, it was named the restaurant with the most disappointing food in London, and second in that category during the following year. The final review was published in 2012, with the review praising that there was "an end in sight to this awful 'mediocrity' when GR's tenure expires".

Whilst at the restaurant, Sargeant was named the National Chef of the Year in 2002. The restaurant was awarded a Michelin star, but it was withdrawn in 2010, a year after Sargeant left. Sargeant had expected the restaurant to regain the star after it was lost, but it remained without a Michelin star. Allen was named the best chef for fish at the 2008 National Chef of the Year competition.

=== Controversy ===
The restaurant received a warning from Westminster City Council due to health and safety issues in 2006, as a sink used to wash dishes was too close to the food preparation area. Three years later, it was reported in the media that Noelie Klineberg had suffered from food poisoning and found cling film in her main course. Her local paper reported it to Westminster Council, who launched an investigation.

On 15 May 2007, as part of a protest against Janet Street-Porter's investigation into the consumption of horse meat in Ramsay's The F Word series, the People for the Ethical Treatment of Animals (PETA) dumped 1 tonne (1,000 kg) of horse manure in a trailer outside the restaurant.
