= Matthew Falder =

British sex offender and blackmailer (born 1988)

- Born: Matthew Alexander Falder; 24 October 1988 (age 38); Manchester, England
- Education: University of Cambridge
- Occupation: Post doctoral researcher
- Status: Incarcerated
- Motive: Sexual sadism
- Conviction: Child abuse
- Criminal charges: October 2017; Encouraging the rape of children Blackmail; Voyeurism; Taking indecent images of children etc.
- Penalty: 25 years + 8 years on licence

Details
- Victims: 46
- Span of crimes: 2007–2017
- Date apprehended: 21 June 2017
- Imprisoned at: HM Prison Birmingham

Academic background
- Thesis: Seismic imaging of thermohaline structure in the Atlantic ocean

Matthew Alexander Falder (born 24 October 1988) is an English serial sex offender and blackmailer. Between 2009 and 2017, he coerced his victims online into sending him degrading images of themselves or into committing crimes against a third person such as rape or assault. He managed this by making threats to the victim by saying he would send their family or friends degrading information or revealing pictures of them (which he usually obtained earlier by obtaining a false trust with the victim) if they did not comply with his commands. Falder hid behind anonymous accounts on the web and then re-posted the images to gain a higher status on the dark web. Investigators said that he "revelled" in getting images to share on hurtcore websites. The National Crime Agency (NCA), described him as "one of the most prolific and depraved offenders they had ever encountered."

Falder pleaded guilty to 137 charges from 46 complainants, making him one of the UK's most prolific sex offenders. In February 2018 he was jailed for 32 years and ordered to serve a further six years on extended licence. The Court of Appeal later reduced the term of imprisonment to 25 years, with an extended licence of 8 years.

== Early life and career ==
Falder grew up in an upper middle class family in Knutsford, Cheshire. He attended Kings School in Macclesfield, Cheshire, where it was reported that he had "excelled".

After school he attended Clare College of the University of Cambridge, specialising in seismic oceanography and earning masters and doctoral degrees. At the time of his arrest, he was working as a post-doctoral researcher and lecturer in geophysics at the University of Birmingham. Falder was well-liked in his peer group, and was described as being extroverted, funny and larger than life.

== Sexual offences ==
Falder's offences date back to 2007, where he engaged in voyeurism by secretly filming his university housemates in their shared bathroom. He would later inform a housemate about his offending, which she laughed off at the time.

Falder's online offending was detected as early as 2009. Falder usually posed as a young woman online and manipulated young children into photographing themselves in compromising positions before offering those images over the internet. In April 2015, the National Crime Agency (NCA) discovered someone posting to the hurtcore websites under the name "666devil", who later turned out to be Falder.

NCA officers arrested Falder in his office at his place of work on 21 June 2017. When they read out a list of the offences he was suspected of committing, Falder remarked that it sounded "like the rap sheet from hell". Falder's victims numbered over 50, and it took over 30 minutes to read out the charges to him at Birmingham Crown Court. Originally charged with 188 offences, he pleaded not guilty to 51 of them; the prosecution accepted this, but they were ordered to remain on file. Falder used various accounts on several websites to pose as a young girl or woman named 'Liz'. On the dark web Falder used names such as 'inthegarden', '666devil' and 'evilmind'. Falder had seventy different online identities. He lured people into taking photographs of themselves in humiliating situations. Falder engaged in hurtcore, which police have characterised as manipulating others into performing acts of "rape, murder, sadism, torture, paedophilia, blackmail, humiliation and degradation". One of Falder's victims was just 14 years old; Falder said online he would willingly "mentally fuck her up" and added, "I am not sure I care if she lives or dies." Falder increased the pressure on his victims, at least four of whom attempted suicide. When one of his victims pleaded for the abuse to end lest they kill themselves, Falder replied that the images he already had on them would be circulated on the Internet anyway. Falder maintained that he could not be caught.

In addition to the NCA, the investigation to uncover his identity involved GCHQ, US Homeland Security, Europol, Australian Federal Police, New Zealand Police and the Israel Police; it lasted four years. Will Kerr of the NCA felt tech companies gave less than ideal cooperation with the police during the enquiry. Kerr maintained accounts were closed down possibly preventing police identifying other victims and identifying patterns of offending. Kerr feared this may have delayed identifying offenders and wanted government action to compel tech companies to cooperate in the future. The NCA detailed crimes such as blackmailing people into eating faeces, licking toilet seats and tampons and persuading people to eat dog food. They described him as "one of the most prolific and depraved offenders they had ever encountered".

== Criminal charges and sentence ==
On 16 October 2017, Falder pleaded guilty to 137 offences against 46 victims, making him one of the most prolific sex offenders in British history. At Birmingham Crown Court on 19 February 2018, Judge Philip Parker sentenced Falder to 32 years in prison, and ordered him to serve a further 6 years on extended licence after his release. The judge at the sentencing hearing described Falder as an "internet highwayman" who was "warped and sadistic" and whose behaviour was "cunning, persistent, manipulative and cruel." After sentencing, investigators released footage of his arrest and described how Falder "revelled" in the anguish and pain that he had caused.

Ruona Iguyovwe, of the CPS, said,

Matthew Falder is a highly manipulative individual who clearly enjoyed humiliating his many victims and the impact of his offending in this case has been significant. He deliberately targeted young and vulnerable victims. At least three victims are known to have attempted suicide and some others have inflicted self-harm. There was a high degree of sophistication and significant planning by Falder due to his use of encryption software and technology in his electronic communication and the use of multiple fake online identities and encrypted email addresses.

Prosecutors stated Falder lived a double life, a graduate of Cambridge University and Birmingham University researcher during the day and a sexual predator at night. Police officer Matt Sutton said,

In more than 30 years of law enforcement I've never come across an offender whose sole motivation was to inflict such profound anguish and pain. Matthew Falder revelled in it. I've also never known such an extremely complex investigation with an offender who was technologically savvy and able to stay hidden in the darkest recesses of the dark web. This investigation represents a watershed moment. Falder is not alone so we will continue to develop and deliver our capabilities nationally for the whole law enforcement system to stop offenders like him from wrecking innocent lives. I commend the victims for their bravery and I urge anyone who is being abused online to report it. There is help available.

Falder appealed against his sentence. On 16 October 2018, the Court of Appeal reduced the term of imprisonment to 25 years, with an extended licence of 8 years.

A spokesperson for the University of Birmingham said, "The University is shocked to hear of the abhorrent crimes committed by a former post-doctoral researcher."

The University of Cambridge stated after the sentencing that they were "actively pursuing" ways of stripping Falder of his academic qualifications. The university could not say if there was a precedent of a removal process for its alumni.

== See also ==
- Sextortion
- The Com
- Hurtcore
- Ian Watkins
- Peter Scully
- Richard Huckle
