= Matthew Graham (disambiguation) =

Matthew Graham is a British television writer.

Matthew or Matt Graham may also refer to:

- Matthew David Graham, Australian child sex offender
- Matt Graham (Scrabble player), American comedian and Scrabble player
- Matt Graham (skier) (born 1994), Australian freestyle skier
- Matt Graham (poker player), American poker player
- Matt Graham (Blue Heelers), fictional character on Australian television drama Blue Heelers
- Matt Graham (survivalist) (born 1974), co-star of the Dual Survival television series
- Matt Graham-Williams (born 2000), New Zealand rugby player
