= Princess Christian's Farm =

Coordinates: 51.22875°N 0.24455°E

Princess Christian's Farm is an educational facility geared towards people with learning disabilities. The farm is run by a partnership with Kent County Council Social Services for the benefit of adults with learning difficulties and disabilities. The overall aim of the partnership is for the individuals to learn new skills and develop opportunities to move into employment.

== Origins and history ==
Situated on the outskirts of Hildenborough (near Tonbridge, Kent), Princess Christian's Farm was first purchased in 1910 by Princess Christian, the third daughter of Queen Victoria, as a home for people with learning difficulties.

It was intended that the farm would be self-supporting - growing vegetables, keeping cattle and poultry. In the early days a milk round was started which was done initially on foot and then later by pony and milk float. This practice continued until around 1935.

In 1948, with the advent of the National Health Service, the Farm became a subsidiary of Leybourne Grange and admissions were made through a Regional Board. The Farm still served as a place where those with learning difficulties could work and contribute to the community. This continued until 1984, when the Health Authority made the decision that it was inappropriate for it to be running a farm. Following negotiations with Kent County Council Social Services, 25 acres (100,000 m^{2}) of land and the farm buildings were taken over by KCC in 1987, with the remaining 96 acres (390,000 m^{2}) let out to local farmers through grazing agreements. These agreements usually ran for a period of less than one year, and due to a lack of maintenance after 1984 the fields were soon in a poor state, with minimal fencing and weeds dominating the pastures. In 1990 the final farmer with a grazing agreement left and the land became redundant until, in 1991, Princess Christian's Farm took back the land with a grazing agreement agreed between Kent County Council and the Health Authority.

This additional land proved to be a great asset to the Farm, enabling them to keep up to 200 sheep, make hay and build a nature trail which is accessible to people with learning disabilities.

In October 2009, Hadlow College – the local land-based college – took over the running of Princess Christian's Farm. Run in partnership with Kent County Council Social Services for the benefit of adults with learning difficulties and disabilities, the overall aim of the partnership is for the individuals to learn new skills and develop opportunities to move into employment.

== About the farm ==
As a traditional working farm, Princess Christian's Farm comprises approximately 115 acres (0.47 km^{2}) of pasture and woodland. It produces its own pork, lamb and beef as well as oven ready chickens and over 1,000 eggs a day. Each Christmas quality turkeys are reared for local customers. Much of the produce is sold through its own farm shop and local butchers.

Within the glasshouses and polytunnels the horticulture department grows a range of plants, herbs and vegetables for sale in the Farm Shop alongside planters and hanging baskets. The farm kitchen provides hot lunches for the students and produces cakes and pastries for local farmers’ markets.

== About the curriculum ==
There are currently places for up to 25 individuals a day at Princess Christian's Farm. Underpinning the curriculum are the following values:

- Respect for self and others
- Self-determination so that people take responsibility for what happens in their lives
- Inclusiveness
- Development of relationships with people at work

These values are designed to demonstrate a commitment by Hadlow College and its staff to ensure that the education fulfils the needs of the students, as well as to acknowledge to the student their need to be challenged and supported.

A student's first month at Princess Christian's Farm includes an initial assessment, which includes a one-to-one interview, tasters and staff observations as well as talking with the key agencies involved.

In working with Hadlow College there is an aim for the students at Princess Christian's Farm to benefit from a much wider access to different activities and qualifications in animal management, horticulture, conservation and agriculture. Another aim is for them to be able to find different work placements.

It is the college's aim that all students progress to their maximum possible level of independence so that they can become active in their communities and in employment.
