= Rorgue =

French cooking equipment company

Rorgue is a French producer of custom-made cooking ranges and stoves.

Founded in 1893 in Clermont-Ferrand as a domestic hotwater and boiler maker, the factory moved to Saint-Denis, next to Paris, at the beginning of the 20th century. There they had access to a number of cafes and restaurants, which all had need for ranges, stoves and ovens.

After producing its first ranges running on solid fuel, Rorgue was one of the first to produce ranges and stoves running on gas, then on electricity.

Rorgue stoves are used by a number of notable chefs, including Heston Blumenthal at London's Mandarin Oriental hotel. Gordon Ramsay at Royal Hospital Road & Maze, Michel Roux Jr. at Le Gavroche, John Willams at The Ritz.

In the UK the ranges are managed and distributed by Exclusive Ranges Ltd who are the sole UK agents.
