= K College =

College in Kent, England

NKC Tonbridge College

Location
- Ashford, Dover, Folkestone, Tonbridge and Royal Tunbridge Wells, Kent; England; 51°11′13″N 0°15′53″E

Information
- Type: Further Education, Higher Education
- Established: April 2010
- Closed: 31 July 2014
- Local authority: Kent County Council
- Department for Education URN: 130727 Tables
- Ofsted: Reports
- Gender: Mixed
- Age: 16 to 99
- Patron: Lord Mayhew of Twysden
- Website: www.kcollege.ac.uk (archived)

NKC Tonbridge College, previously known as K College and South & West Kent College, was an English college of Further Education and Higher Education with facilities across Kent, formed in April 2010, by the merger of South Kent College with West Kent College. In 2014 it was split again, between Hadlow College and East Kent College, with West Kent College being reestablished and the campus in Ashford becoming Ashford College. It is now known as NKC Tonbridge College which is part of North Kent Colleges Group from September 2026.

The Interim Principal was Phil Frier and the Patron was Lord Mayhew of Twysden.

== History ==
K College was formed in April 2010 by the merger of South Kent College with West Kent College. The college had campuses in Ashford, Dover, Folkestone, Tonbridge and Royal Tunbridge Wells and at one point had more than 25,000 students. As of March 2013, when the decision was taken to split it, the college had approximately 15,000 students and more than 1,100 staff.

The college sustained a large amount of debt, after which the principal, Bill Fearon, and some members of the Board of Governors resigned, and the Skills Funding Agency recommended it be sold. The college received an "inadequate" grading by Ofsted in December 2013, and from 1 August 2014 it was again split into two units:

- Hadlow College Group formally acquired K College Group; it took over the Tonbridge and Tunbridge Wells campuses as West Kent College and Ashford campus as Ashford College.
- East Kent College took over Folkestone and Dover.

In July 2014 prior to Hadlow College managing the Ashford, Tonbridge and Tunbridge Wells campuses, K College announced that there would be up to 127 redundancies of those not transferred under TUPE to East Kent College. Therefore other, more creative means were found by EKC in order to shed staff and axe courses. Months of chaos at Dover and Folkestone ensued. However, East Kent College expanded offerings and recruited additional staff for the Folkestone and Dover campuses after the takeover.

== Courses ==
K College offered Higher Education courses in conjunction with the College’s partner universities: Canterbury Christ Church University, University of Greenwich and University of Kent.

The main campus in Tonbridge taught a large number of A-level and vocational courses including apprenticeships. It also ran teacher training courses, including additional teaching courses on deaf issues and dyslexia, and TUC courses and had a Professional Development Centre. The college also ran a construction-orientated teaching centre based at the Construction Crafts & Engineering Centre on North Farm Industrial Estate in Tunbridge Wells.

== Alumni of West Kent College ==
- Mark Sargeant — chef
- Hazel Crowney — actress, model
- The Duchess of Edinburgh (née Sophie Rhys-Jones)
- Jilly Goolden — TV presenter & wine connoisseur

== See also ==
- North West Kent College
- Robert Gordon University
