= Aubergine (London restaurant) =

- Former location of Aubergine in London

Restaurant information
- Established: 1993; 33 years ago
- Closed: September 8, 2010; 16 years ago
- Owner: London Fine Dining Group
- Head chef: Gordon Ramsay (1993–98); William Drabble (1999–2009); Christophe Renou (2009–10)
- Food type: French cuisine
- Rating: (1997–99)
- Location: 11 Park Walk, London, SW10 0AJ, United Kingdom
- Coordinates: 51.485983°N 0.180011°W
- Seating capacity: 45
- Other locations: Compleat Angler Hotel, Marlow

Aubergine was a restaurant in Chelsea, London. Owned by A-Z Restaurants, it was opened under chef Gordon Ramsay in 1993. Aubergine was awarded two Michelin stars in 1997, which it held until Ramsay left the restaurant in July 1998 following the firing of Marcus Wareing from sister restaurant L'Oranger. It subsequently reopened and held a single Michelin star under William Drabble until he left the restaurant in 2009. Aubergine closed in 2010, pending a relaunch as an informal Italian restaurant.

== History ==
The restaurant was opened by A-Z restaurants in 1993. The company was owned by Claudio Pulze, Franco Zanelleto and Giuliano Lotto. The company also opened a second, unrelated restaurant, called Memories of China, during 1993.

Marco Pierre White knew the owners of the restaurant, and introduced his protégé, Gordon Ramsay, to them. The 26-year-old Ramsay was subsequently hired as head chef and given a 25% stake in the restaurant.

Marcus Wareing was hired in 1993 as a sous chef, and Angela Hartnett joined the restaurant in 1994, both later leaving to join sister restaurant L'Oranger. Mark Sargeant joined the team at the restaurant in 1997, and would later become head chef under Ramsay at Claridge's in 2001.

In 1998, a helmet-wearing motorcyclist entered the restaurant, grabbed the reservations book and drove off. This was the only place where the restaurant's reservations were recorded. Despite blaming his former mentor White as the person behind the theft at the time, and claiming that he was being stalked by the person who stole the book, Ramsay later admitted in 2007 that he was behind it, saying, "I nicked it. I blamed Marco. Because I knew that would fuck him and that it would call off the dogs... I still have the book in a safe at home." Ramsay had believed at the time that his bosses at A-Z Restaurants were planning to replace him with White, who had always denied the theft, saying after Ramsay's admission that "it bothered me that I'd been accused of theft. But it was totally inconceivable – implausible. What would my gain have been to behave like that?" White later threatened legal action against Ramsay, and considered a libel case as Ramsay blamed White for the incident in his autobiography Humble Pie.

After A-Z Restaurants sacked Wareing from L'Oranger in May 1998, the following month Ramsay orchestrated a walkout of the entire staff of both L'Oranger and Aubergine. Ramsay didn't quit himself, but instead handed in his notice and was subsequently told that he wasn't required to work it. Ramsay later described the walkout as "Black Friday". A-Z restaurants subsequently sued Ramsay for £1 million citing lost revenue and breach of contract, but eventually settled out of court. The closure of the two restaurants was thought to be costing A-Z Restaurants around £15,000 a day in lost income.

Ramsay's departure from Aubergine was documented in the first episode of the Channel 4 television series Boiling Point, and he subsequently opened Restaurant Gordon Ramsay on the former site of La Tante Claire. Ramsay was succeeded at Aubergine by executive chef William Drabble, who had previously worked at the Michelin-starred Nook. Following Ramsay's departure, the restaurant reopened on 11 September 1998.

The restaurant was expanded to a sister site in 2009 at the Compleat Angler Hotel, Marlow. Miles Nixon, who was previously a sous chef under Drabble at the main restaurant, headed up the kitchen. It served the same dishes as the Chelsea restaurant but was able to charge less due to lower overheads. From agreeing to the lease at the hotel to opening the restaurant took two months. Drabble left the restaurant later that year. He was replaced by Nixon as executive chef, who remained working at the Marlow restaurant. Christophe Renou was brought in as head chef for Aubergine in London. After a year, it was announced that the restaurant's owners were considering closing the restaurant to refurbish it and relaunch it as an informal Italian restaurant. It is now owned by Gordon Ramsay and operates as Gordon Ramsay Maze Grill Park Walk.

== Reception ==
In 2000, Nigel Farndale visited the restaurant for The Daily Telegraph. He "wasn't too sure" about the theatricality of the waiters in presenting some of the dishes, but thought that the menu was good value and saw it as a positive experience despite taking along a companion who was not impressed with several of the dishes.

Whilst under Ramsay, the restaurant was awarded a Michelin star for the first time in 1995, and was awarded a second star in 1997. It held the second star for a further year until Ramsay left the restaurant, and dropped down to a single star once more in 1999 under Drabble, who kept the star until his departure. It was voted the best French restaurant in London at the London Restaurant Awards in 2000.

== See also ==
- List of French restaurants
