= Chris Ely =

English butler and estate manager

Chris Ely is a professional English butler and estate manager and the former Dean of the Bespoke Institute at The French Culinary Institute in New York City. He began his career as a footman at Buckingham Palace, where he was a member of Queen Elizabeth II's household staff. After leaving in 1984, he worked as a butler and an estate manager for employers including Joel Schumacher and Brooke Astor.

== Early life and education ==
Chris Ely was born February 10, 1963, at the Royal Air Force (R.A.F.) Hospital Wegberg in West Germany. His father was based at Rheindahlen Military Complex during the 'Cold War', and the family led the typical military life, moving to a new base every two and a half years. The family returned to England in 1969.

Ely attended Kent College, Canterbury, England from 1976-1979 studying Arts and Humanities, and from 1979-1981 attended Thanet Technical College, Broadstairs, Kent, U.K., completing the General Catering Course, where he studied food service, French cuisine, and housekeeping.

== Career ==
Recognized for his work at Thanet Technical college, Ely was invited to interview for a vacant footman position at Buckingham Palace. He became a member of Queen Elizabeth II's household in 1981, starting as an apprentice, moving up into the role of Senior Footman, performing his duties at Buckingham Palace, Windsor Castle and Sandringham House in England, and Balmoral Castle and The Palace of Holyroodhouse in Scotland.

Leaving royal service in 1984, Ely later held positions as a houseman, valet, butler, personal assistant, and estate manager for employers in the diplomatic, business, and entertainment field, including director/producer/screenwriter Joel Schumacher, and philanthropist Brooke Astor. In 2010, he joined The French Culinary Institute as Dean of the Estate Management Studies Program, where he designed and introduced the Bespoke Institute.

As of 2011 Ely was an in-home consultant and domestic staff trainer for private clients, also publishing on social media.
