= Fresh Start Initiative =

Sustainable farming plan

Launched at the Smithfield Show in December 2004 by Sir Don Curry, the Fresh Start initiative aims to secure a sustainable future for farming in England by:

- promoting an entrepreneurial culture, amongst the next generation of farm business owners
- promoting the use of generic business planning & management techniques
- promotion of farming (and all its associated activities) as an attractive career option for new entrants
- development of a “matching service” that will link potential new entrants to those wishing to reduce their direct involvement or retire.
- development of a national mentoring capability for all new / growing farm enterprises
- practical support for a continual professional development culture to be adopted by everybody working in this industry

A further objective is to stimulate existing farmers to think about their businesses in a post CAP reform environment, whether this leads to a planned expansion/a diversification or a managed exit. The choices made could create new opportunities for new entrants.

== The First Academy ==
One year after the initiative was launched, representatives from a range of bodies including Fresh Start, Chichester College, Plumpton College, the Sussex Young Farmers and the Laurence Gould Partnership met to discuss Fresh Start and how it can be taken forward in the South East. From this meeting, and subsequent meetings, the concept of the Fresh Start Academy was created.

In February 2006 18 potential members met with stakeholders to discuss the principle of the Academy. From this meeting the Sussex Academy was started with the Kent one, based at Hadlow College, following close behind.

== The Role of the Academy ==
Although each Academy can be tailored to individual requirements., they are all designed to help new entrants find openings in the farm industry. They typically involve training in business skills, mentoring and then identifying opportunities through a matchmaking network.

The programme consists of a twelve-month training course which covers various aspects of farm business management, with students attending one session every month. Likely topics include:

- The impact of mid-term review
- How to successfully market your business
- Environmental stewardship
- Diversification
- Applying for tenancies and the rules and regulations relating to tenancies
- Business administration
- Communication and IT
- Risk management

Throughout the programme land agents and consultants are involved to ensure that business opportunities for entrants can be established at the same time.

In 2008 the Kent Academy, hosted by Hadlow College was the first in the South-East to hold its Awards Ceremony. Several members of this Academy have already enjoyed success with some being awarded tenancies and others working with the Ring of Agricultural Machinery in Sussex and Kent (RAMSAK) on a grazing project.
