= Mark Sargeant =

English chef and restaurateur

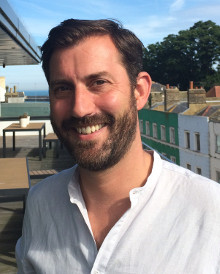
- Born: August 1973 (age 53); Kent, England
- Education: West Kent College (1991)
- Culinary career
- Cooking style: Modern British
- Previous restaurants
- Morden & Lea; The Strand Dining Rooms; Oxwell & Co; The Swan at The Globe Theatre; The Swan; Foxtrot Oscar; The Warrington; The Devonshire; The Narrow; Gordon Ramsay at Claridge's; Restaurant Gordon Ramsay; Aubergine; Coast Restaurant; Chez Nico; Le Souffle Restaurant; Read's Restaurant; Boodle's Gentleman's Club; Rocksalt Folkestone; The Smokehouse Folkestone; Plum and Spilt Milk; The Duke William
- Television shows
- Saturday Kitchen; Saturday Cookbook; Hell's Kitchen (UK); The F Word; Great British Menu
- Awardss
- Young Chef of the Year; National Chef of the Year; 1 Michelin Star

Mark Sargeant (born August 1973) is an English chef and restaurateur from Larkfield, Kent.

== Early life ==
Born in Kent, Sargeant grew up in Larkfield, Kent and attended Oakwood Park Grammar School in Maidstone. From an early age, Sargeant's interest in food and cooking grew strongly, leading to his first work experience cooking in the kitchens of the Larkfield Priory Hotel in 1988.

== Career ==
Having graduated from West Kent College in 1991, Sargeant landed his first professional job at Boodle's Gentleman's Club in St James, London working with Keith Podmore in 1991. During his early years as a professional chef, Sargeant also worked at several respected restaurants including the role of chef de partie at Read's Restaurant in Faversham. In 1994, Sargeant took up a position at Le Souffle Restaurant at the Hyde Park Hotel for 18 months where he then moved onto Oliver Peyton's Coast restaurant in 1996. Within the same year, Sargeant was awarded 'Young Chef of the Year'.

Sargeant first worked with Gordon Ramsay at Aubergine in 1997 before spending three years as sous-chef at Restaurant Gordon Ramsay in Chelsea from 1998 to 2001, gaining 3 Michelin Starred Awards also in 2001. He then opened the highly acclaimed Gordon Ramsay at Claridge's where he was chef de cuisine from 2001 to 2008, which earned a Michelin star in 2002. At the time of his career at Claridges, Sargeant was awarded 'Chef of the Year' in 2002.

He also oversaw the openings of the Gordon Ramsay Holdings pubs including The Narrow, The Warrington, The Devonshire and The Foxtrot Oscar. Throughout his time with Gordon Ramsay, Sargeant was responsible for all of his media activities and co-authored his 12 books, wrote regular columns for the Times Magazine, Olive and BBC Good Food magazines, as well as assisting with the production of his television work both in the UK and abroad. After 13 years working under Ramsay, Sargeant resigned in November 2009 and joined The Swan Collection with The Swan in West Malling and The Swan at The Globe as Creative Director.

In 2011, Sargeant joined Canteen as consultant chef. June 2011, Sargeant opened his first two solo projects in the coastal town of Folkestone in Kent, Rocksalt Restaurant and The Smokehouse Fish and Chips, where he first became a restaurateur. The opening of the two restaurants became part of the Regeneration Plan for Folkestone, and quickly became the hot spot destination for tourists and foodies alike. Rocksalt has since won a string of awards including 84th best restaurant in the Restaurant Magazine top 100 uk restaurants 2013, Best Restaurant in Kent 2014, 5th best restaurant by the sea in the Times magazine, 2 AA Rosettes and 4 AA stars for Rocksalt Rooms.

Sargeant's first cookbook was published in October 2011 "My Kind of Cooking" and is published by Quercus.

Sargeant was later approached in 2012 to create exclusive dishes for Royal Ascot where he developed five new dishes for the event.

ITV produced flagship Saturday morning cookery show ‘Saturday Cookbook’ which premiered on 14 April 2012, presented by Sargeant and Nadia Sawalha.

In 2013, Sargeant became Chef Director of Plum and Spilt Milk, located within the Great Northern Hotel. Sargeant also became involved with Oxwell & Co in Singapore, where he became Chef Director.

Sargeant became the Chef Director at The Strand Dining Rooms in 2015, helping to devise a brand new menu for the restaurant.

Sargeant's first establishment The Duke William a country pub situated in Ickham, Kent, was launched early 2015. Shortly after, Rooms at The Duke William opened to the public after a full refurbishment in the spring 2015.

June 2015 saw Sargeant open Morden & Lea his first central London restaurant in Soho, serving a variety of modern and contemporary British dishes.

In February 2016, after an amicable agreement, Sargeant parted ways with Morden & Lea.

In 2021, Sargeant decided to leave the Rocksalt Group and sold his minor stake (Rocksalt Restaurant and bar, The Smokehouse, The Wife of Bath, The Duke William Pub)

In August 2022, Sargeant opened his first solo restaurant as Chef Patron at the self-named Brasserie MS in Clifton Gardens, Folkestone. Art-deco in style with a classic French menu, Sargeant is taking inspiration from the respected French chefs of the 90s and re-imagining these ideas for the modern day, in a relaxed and comfortable setting. The Brasserie MS achieved 2AA rosettes within ten weeks of opening.

== Awards ==
- Young Chef of the Year - 1996
- Chef of the Year - 2002

== Restaurants ==
=== Current restaurants ===
Restaurant	Location	Position
Plum & Spilt Milk	Great Northern Hotel, London, England	Chef Director
GNH Bar	Great Northern Hotel, London, England	Chef Director
KIOSK	King's Cross station, London, England	Chef Director

=== Previous restaurants ===
Restaurant	Location	Position
The Wife of Bath	Wye, Kent, England	Chef Director
The Waterleaf Restaurant	Reynolds Retreat, Borough Green, Kent, England	Chef Director
Morden & Lea	London, England	Chef Director
The Strand Dining Rooms	London, England	Chef Director
Oxwell & Co	Singapore	Chef Director
Canteen	London	Consultant Chef
The Swan at The Globe Theatre	Globe Theatre, London	Creative Director
The Swan	West Malling, Kent, England	Creative Director
Foxtrot Oscar	Chelsea, London	Chef de Cuisine
The Warrington	Maida Vale, London	Executive Chef
The Devonshire	Chiswick, London	Executive Chef
The Narrow	Limehouse, London	Executive Chef
Gordon Ramsay at Claridge's	Claridge's Hotel, London	Chef de Cuisine
Restaurant Gordon Ramsay	Claridge's Hotel, London	Sous Chef
Aubergine	Royal Hospital Road, Chelsea, London	Sous Chef
Oliver Peyton's Coast Restaurant	Mayfair London	Sous Chef
Chez Nico	Park Lane, London	Sous Chef
Le Souffle Restaurant	Intercontinental Hotel, Hyde Park Corner, London	Junior Sous Chef
Read's Restaurant	Faversham, Kent	Chef de Partie
Boodle's Gentleman's Club	St James, London	Sous Che
Rocksalt Restaurant & Bar	Folkestone, Kent, England	Chef Director
Smokehouse Fish & Chips	Folkestone, Kent, England	Chef Director
The Duke William	Ickham, Kent, England	Chef Director
The Radnor Arms	Folkestone, Kent, England	Chef Director
The Woolpack	Warehorne, Kent, England	Chef Director
The Five Bells	Brabourne, Kent, England	Chef Director

== Television appearances ==
- Boiling Point (5-part documentary) (Channel 4, 1998)
- Beyond Boiling Point (6-part documentary) (Channel 4, 2000)
- Ramsay's Kitchen Nightmares (Channel 4, 2004–present)
- Hell's Kitchen (UK) (ITV, 2004)
- The F Word (Channel 4, 2005–2010)
- Great British Menu (BBC Two, 2009), representing London and South East, losing to Tristan Welch in heats
- This Morning (ITV,2013)
- Cooks Questions' (Channel 4,2014)
- Saturday Kitchen (BBC One, 2005–present)
- Saturday Cookbook (ITV, 2012)

Beat the chef (channel 4),(2019–present)

== Bibliography ==
- Gordon Ramsay's Just Desserts (2001), Quadrille Publishing Ltd, ISBN 978-1902757193
- Gordon Ramsay's Secret's (2003), Quadrille Publishing Ltd, ISBN 978-1844000371
- Gordon Ramsay Makes it Easy (2005), Quadrille Publishing Ltd, ISBN 978-1844001163
- Gordon Ramsay's Sunday Lunch (2006), Quadrille Publishing Ltd, ISBN 978-1844002801
- Gordon Ramsay's 3 Star Chef (2008), Key Porter Books, ISBN 978-1554700905
- Cooking for Friends:Food from My Table (Gordon Ramsay),(2008), HarperCollins, ISBN 978-0007267033
- Gordon Ramsay's Healthy Appetite, (2008), Quadrille Publishing Ltd, ISBN 978-1849491891
- Gordon Ramsay's Great British Pub Food, (2009), HarperCollins, ISBN 978-0007289820
- Gordon Ramsay's World Kitchen, (2009), Quadrille Publishing Ltd, ISBN 978-1844007134
- Gordon Ramsay's Great Escape, (2010), HarperCollins, ISBN 978-0007353101
- My Kind of Cooking, (2011), Quercus, ISBN 978-0857381651
- We Love Potatoes, (2012), The Little Big Voice, ISBN 978-0-9569248-1-0
- Saturday Kitchen Cooking Bible, (2013), W&N, ISBN 978-0297869108
