= Task Force Argos =

Queensland Police Service
- Motto: With Honour We Serve

Agency overview
- Formed: 1 January 1997
- Employees: 10,237

Jurisdictional structure
- Operations jurisdiction: Queensland, Australia
- General nature: Civilian police

Operational structure
- Headquarters: 200 Roma Street, Brisbane, QLD 4000; 27.4664°S 153.0182°E
- Units: List: Child Protection and Investigation Unit; Special Emergency Response Team; Tactical Crime Squad; Task Force Argos

Website
- www.police.qld.gov.au/

Task Force Argos is a branch of the Queensland Police Service, responsible for the investigation of online child exploitation and abuse. Founded in 1997, the unit's original charter was to investigate institutional child abuse allegations arising from the Forde Inquiry.

The unit's name was derived from Greek mythology, in which Argus Panoptes, or Argos, was a primordial "all seeing" giant with multiple eyes, guardian of the goddess Io. As protector of the goddess, Argos was great and strong: sleep never fell upon his eyes, and he kept sure watch always.

Technological advances and wider access to the Internet led the unit in 2002 to explore avenues to address growing community concern over the proliferation of child exploitation across the internet. Argos identified potential threats to children in online chat rooms, where sexual predators were grooming children and recruiting them to engage in sexual activity.

== Notable cases ==
In March 2002, Argos began an undercover operation against a person whom they had discovered in a chat room seeking underage girls for sex. An Argos operative, posing as a 14-year-old girl, was asked to meet the offender in Brisbane so he could photograph her nude and have sex with her. During the online conversations the offender claimed to have some 66,000 images of child exploitation. Argos identified the offender, and a search of his computer identified contact offences involving multiple children. One child was 12 years of age at the time, and had been befriended by the offender on the internet. The other child was aged five, and was made available to the offender by her father whom the offender had met in an internet chat room.

In 2004, a child pornography website, located in Belarus, was taken down by an international task force, involving the Australian Federal Police and the Australian High Tech Crime Centre under the codename Operation Auxin. The operation saw the arrest of 154 Australians, including 57 in Queensland. Argos officers identified seven children located in Brisbane from the child exploitation material and rescued them from further harm.

In 2006, a similar international operation was undertaken, codenamed Operation Achilles. Argos formed an alliance with the Federal Bureau of Investigation in a lengthy covert operation that dismantled a sophisticated international network of online offenders responsible for distributing and creating on-demand, graphic, child exploitation material. Achilles began in January 2006 and closed in February 2008, with the execution of warrants and arrest of offenders in Australia, the United States, Germany and the United Kingdom. Argos officers infiltrated the international child sex offender network who were trading images and videos depicting the violent sexual abuse of children. The completion of Achilles and its associated sub-operations around the world resulted in the removal of more than 60 children from sexually abusive situations, the arrest of 22 network members globally and the closure of four commercial child exploitation websites.

The work of Argos in raising community awareness to the dangers of online predatory behaviour has been recognised globally. The team was awarded the International Law Enforcement Cybercrime Award 2011 (Gold award) by The Society for the Policing of Cyberspace (POLCYB), a Canadian-based organisation committed to enhancing partnerships in order to prevent and combat crimes in cyberspace.

Argos has also partnered with Microsoft to develop the Australian National Victim Image Library aimed at reducing investigator exposure to child exploitation material and improve opportunity to identify children at risk. Microsoft donated its technical development expertise to build this capability and the identification database is currently in national deployment.

Argos works closely with international counterparts to deliver positive outcomes for child victims, irrespective of where those children might be geographically located. The unit relies on victim identification expertise and their specialist is also the chair of the Interpol Specialist Group on Crimes Against Children. By employing victim identification strategies that effectively identify and locate child victims, their offenders can be found and prosecuted. One such operation involved the police taking over and running a dark web network for several months, resulting in the rescuing of 85 children and hundreds of arrests, including notorious British paedophile Richard Huckle and the site's operator, Shannon McCoole.

Argos expends considerable effort to protect children on-line by researching contemporary technology to effectively target on-line predators. Adopting the mantra to 'Leave No Stone Unturned' and the insignia of the scorpion (the natural predator of the 'rock spider') their focus is squarely on child protection to ensure exhaustive inquiries are conducted so that no child victim of sexual exploitation is ever overlooked.

During 2016–2017, Argos operated the darknet child pornography site Childs Play for eleven months.

== Notable abandoned prosecutions ==
In December 2008, task force members arrested and charged a Maroochydore man with 'using the internet to access and publish child-abuse material' after he allegedly reposted on Liveleak a viral video of another man swinging a baby by its arms. Although the offender was successfully committed to the district court for trial, on 9 September 2009 it was announced that the charges had been dropped by the Commonwealth Director of Public Prosecutions after reviewing the case. The poster has called for an inquiry into how he came to be charged in the first place.
