= Chelsea Bridge Road =

Street in Chelsea, London

Coordinates: 51°29′17″N 0°09′13″W

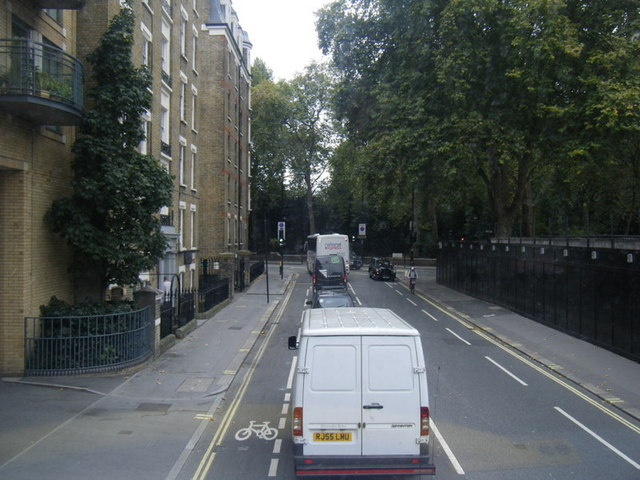
Ebury Bridge Road, looking towards Chelsea Bridge Road, with Ranelagh Gardens beyond.

Chelsea Bridge Road is the modern eastern boundary of Chelsea, in the Royal Borough of Kensington and Chelsea, London, England. To the northeast is the district of Pimlico in the City of Westminster.

The road runs between Chelsea Bridge on the Chelsea Embankment, with the River Thames to the southeast and a junction with Royal Hospital Road, Lower Sloane Street and Pimlico Road to the northwest. The closest tube station is Sloane Square to the north along Lower Sloane Street. The road is part of the A3216 route.

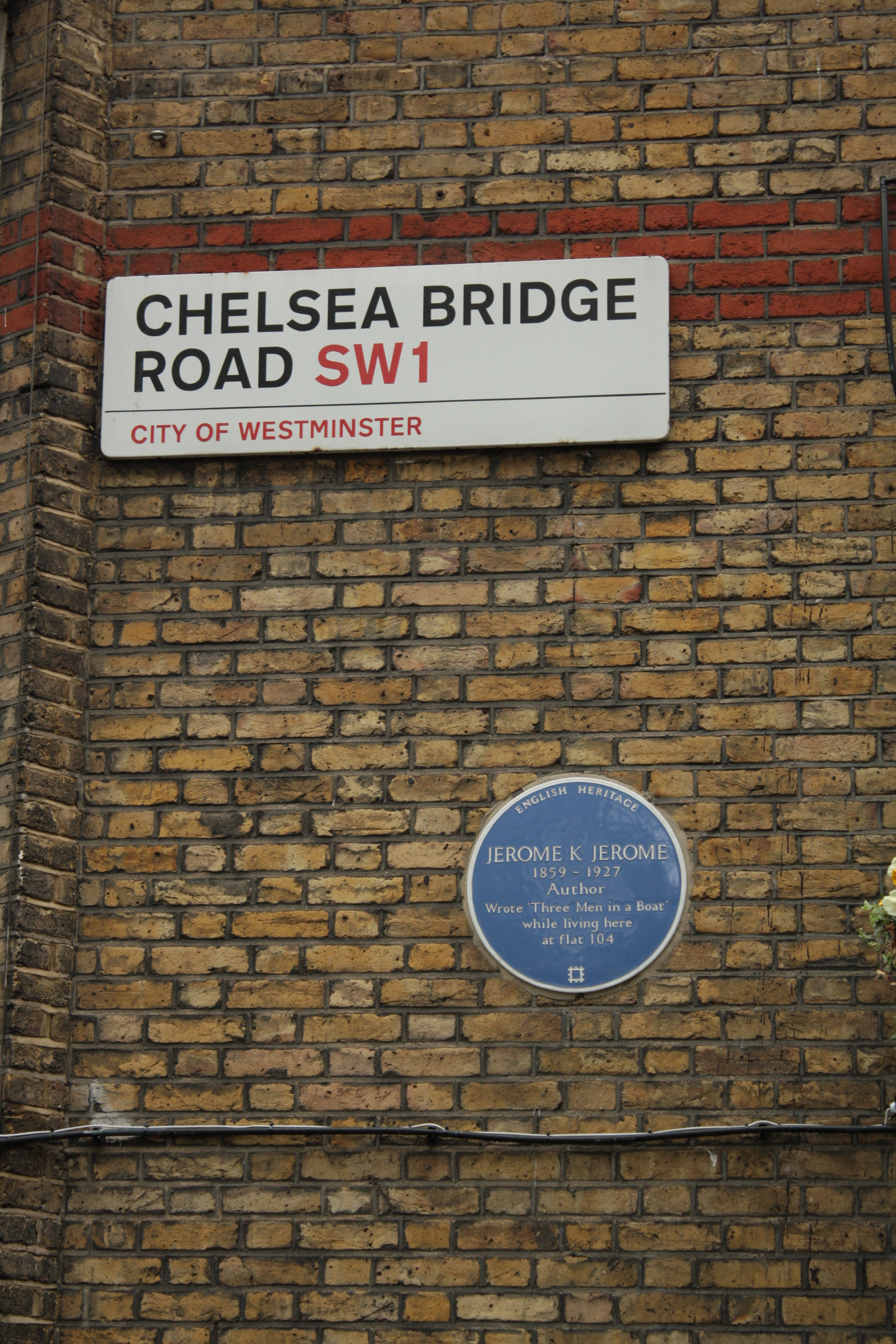
The sign for Chelsea Bridge Road, on the house where Jerome K Jerome wrote Three Men in a Boat

Immediately to the southwest are Ranelagh Gardens. Beyond that are the grounds of the Royal Hospital Chelsea. Also close by is the National Army Museum, next to the Royal Hospital Chelsea on Royal Hospital Road. The Lister Hospital is also on Chelsea Bridge Road.
