= Hadlow College =

FE and HE college in Kent, UK

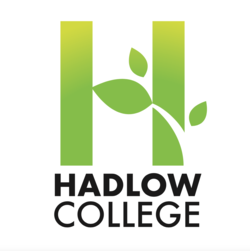
- Hadlow College Logo
- Type: Further education, higher education
- Established: 1968
- Principal: David Gleed
- Students: 2,200
- Location: Tonbridge Road, Hadlow, Kent, TN11 0AL, England; 51°13′31″N 0°19′44″E
- Campus: Rural
- Language: English
- URN: 130733
- Gender: Mixed
- Website: www.hadlow.ac.uk

Hadlow College is a further and higher education college in Hadlow, Kent, England. The curriculum primarily covers land-based subjects including Agriculture, Horticulture, Conservation and Wildlife Management, Animal Management, Fisheries Management, Equine Studies and Floristry. Additionally, intermediate and advanced apprenticeships are offered in Golf Greenkeeping, Sports Turf, Agriculture, Horticulture and Land-based Engineering.

The college had its origins in 1919 as the Kent Farm Institute. A Kent Horticultural Institute was formed in 1949, and in 1958 the two were merged into the Kent Farm and Horticultural Institute. In 1967, this became the Hadlow College of Agriculture and Horticulture on a new site at Hadlow.

== Origins and history ==
In 1919, a scheme of Agricultural Education for the County, which included the provision of a Farm Institute, was approved at a meeting of the Kent Education Committee. Borden Grammar School at Sittingbourne agreed to sell their property to the Kent Education Committee as soon as a new grammar school was built, but it was not until 1929 that Borden Grammar School was occupied and its building adapted for Kent Farm Institute purposes. Grove End Farm, Tunstall, Kent was purchased in July 1919 to be run as the Institute's farm.

After the Second World War, the Kent Education Committee bought the remaining buildings of the former Swanley Horticultural College in Hextable, Swanley, together with 60 acres (24 ha) of land to form the basis of the Kent Horticultural Institute. Until 1949, this Institute was used as a training centre in horticulture for ex-service personnel under the supervision of the Ministry of Agriculture. In September 1949, the Education Committee took possession and the Kent Horticulture Institute was developed and run in parallel with the Kent Farm Institute.

In 1958, the two institutes were merged to form the Kent Farm and Horticulture Institute. Although the two departments were 30 miles (48 km) apart, this was the first step in bringing the two together. In the spring of 1960, 600 acres (240 ha) of land was purchased from Bourne Grange Estate, Hadlow, for the establishment of a combined Institute.

Alexander Ruthven Pym was chairman of governors of the Institute for many years, resigning in July 1963.

The Agricultural Department moved from Sittingbourne to the new site at Hadlow in the summer of 1966, and the Horticultural Department in the summer of 1967. The Institute was then renamed Hadlow College of Agriculture and Horticulture. On 22 March 1968, His Royal Highness Prince Philip, Duke of Edinburgh, officially opened the college.

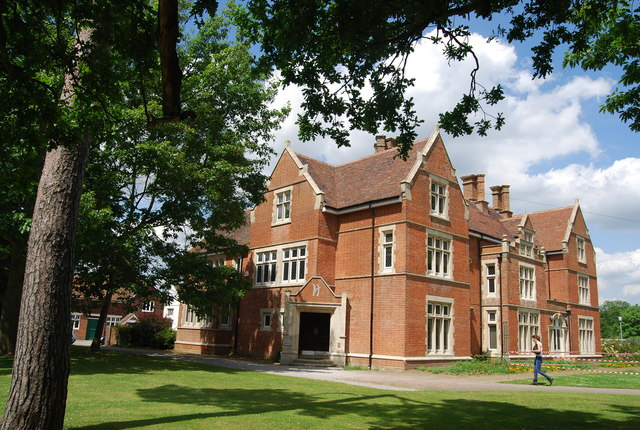
Garrad House, the original Bourne Grange Estate house - now the college's main building

In June 2010, the college was graded "outstanding" by Ofsted. It also received an "outstanding" grade for its residential care provision at its most recent Ofsted social care inspection.

== Hadlow College ==
In 2009, Hadlow College was approached by Dover District Council and Kent County Council to develop the site of the former Betteshanger Colliery. The resultant scheme – Betteshanger Park – was the outcome of four years of partnership working. The scheme was launched on 6 November 2013 at the House of Commons with work commencing on site in 2014. On 2 December 2019, Quinn Estates purchased the 299-acre Betteshanger Park from Hadlow College.

On 1 August 2014, Hadlow College formally acquired the Tonbridge and Ashford campuses of K College, re-establishing them as Ashford College and West Kent College (2014).

On 17 May 2019, Hadlow College become the first in the country to go into educational administration. That same year, following a review by the Further Education Commissioner, it was recommended that the Hadlow College Group be split up and taken on by three colleges: North Kent College, East Kent Colleges Group and Capel Manor College.

On 1 January 2020, the education-related facilities of Hadlow College’s Mottingham campus transferred to Capel Manor College.

On 1 April 2020, the education-related facilities of Hadlow College’s Canterbury site, as well as Ashford College, transferred to East Kent College Group.

On 15 August 2020, the education-related facilities of Hadlow College, including Princess Christian’s Farm and the equestrian centre in Greenwich, and West Kent College (2014) transferred to North Kent College.

Currently Hadlow College is run by North Kent College who have campuses in Dartford, Gravesend and Tonbridge as well

== Facilities ==
Set on a 100ha estate, its equine centre is listed within the London 2012 Training Guide and its animal management building opened in spring 2009.

Additional facilities on the estate include a fully functioning farm with a beef herd, breeding sheep, animal management unit, variety of habitats for woodland and countryside management, stock ponds, hatchery, cross country equine courses together with international size arenas, 3.2 acres (13,000 m^{2}) glasshouse complex and a landscape training centre.

=== National Centre for Reptile Welfare (NCRW) ===
The College is home to the National Centre for Reptile Welfare (NCRW), which opened in 2018, and is the first such centre of its type in the UK, bringing education, charity and the pet industry together. Run with The Pet Charity and developed in partnership with the Reptile & Exotic Pet Trade Association (REPTA), it provides refuge, rehabilitation and care for reptiles, amphibians and invertebrates, rehoming them to individuals and via a national network of retailers and wholesalers. The centre also provides undergraduate students with practical husbandry, care and non-invasive behavioural and husbandry research opportunities on a wide range of captive species, as well as access to recognised animal welfare and husbandry experts, such as Chris Newman. Although it is situated on the grounds, the National centre For Reptile Welfare is not associated with Hadlow College.

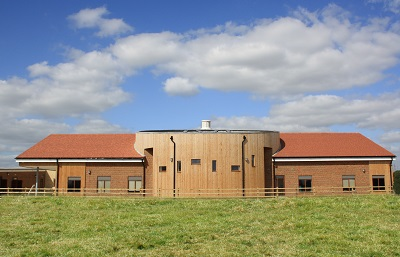
The College's Animal Management Unit

=== Royal Borough of Greenwich Equestrian Centre ===
Formally opened in December 2013 by The Princess Royal, the Royal Borough of Greenwich Equestrian Centre offers full-time further and higher education, as well as part-time courses, in horse care and equine therapy.

Current courses include: Preparation for British Horse Society Stage 1 Award, Level 3 qualifications in Horse Management, Foundation Degree in Equine Sports Therapy and Rehabilitation and a full BSc (Hons) degree in Equine Sports Therapy and Rehabilitation. Facilities include: stables for 20 horses, a hydrotherapy pool, water treadmill, spa, indoor arena and outdoor arena as well as a paddocks and a horse-walker.

=== Hadlow Rural Community School ===
In September 2013, Hadlow Rural Community School (a mixed free school) was opened on the Hadlow campus. The first school in Kent to offer a farm-based secondary education for students aged 11 to 16, it began with 80 pupils, and has a maximum capacity of 330.

=== Charlton Athletic Football Academy ===
On 28 May 2014, the college announced that they would begin running a post-16 football academy programme, in partnership with Charlton Athletic, from September at their main campus near Tonbridge, Kent. The college's football academy programme was previously run in partnership with Tonbridge Angels and trials are held at various times every year to be able to field a squad to represent the college in regular competitions.

== People associated with the college ==
=== Notable alumni ===
- Roger Bootle-Wilbraham, 7th Baron Skelmersdale, British politician and Conservative member of the House of Lords.
- Toby Buckland, gardener, BBC TV Presenter (Gardeners' World) and author
- Nick Bailey (garden designer)
- David Domoney, horticulturalist, gardener, broadcaster (ITV’s This Morning and Love Your Garden) and writer
- Barbara Fry, daffodil breeder and horticulturist (attended Kent Horticulture Institute)
- Bethany Williams, garden designer, joint winner of an RHS Hampton Court Palace Flower Show 2015 gold medal
- Matthew Wilson (gardener)

=== Notable former staff ===
- Nick Bailey (garden designer)
