= Lister Hospital, Chelsea =

Private hospital in London

Lister Hospital
- Hospital Corporation of America
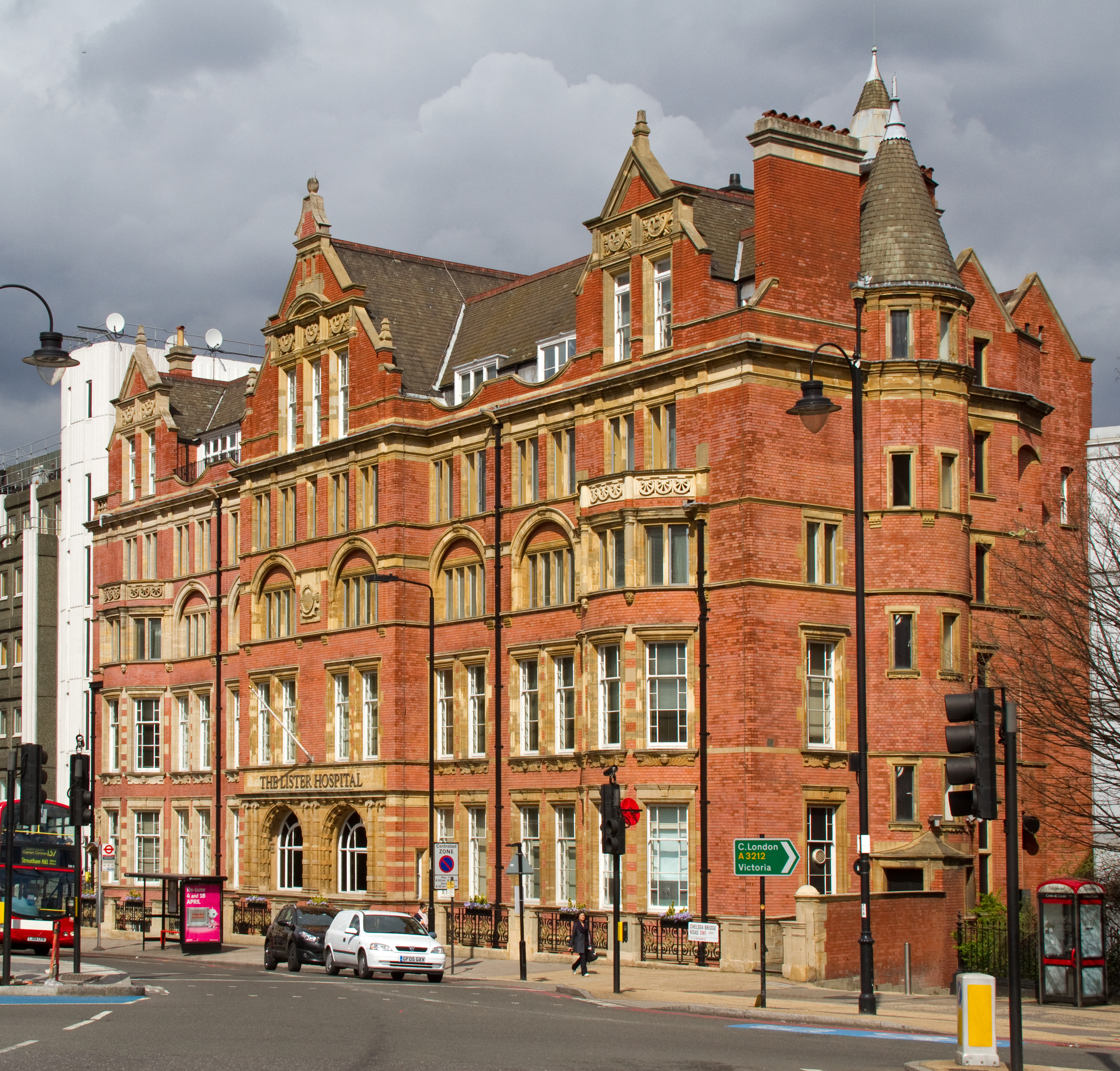
- Lister Hospital

- Location in Kensington and Chelsea

Geography
- Location: Chelsea Bridge Road, London, England, United Kingdom
- Coordinates: 51.4863°N 0.1502°W

Organisation
- Care system: Hospital Corporation of America

Services
- Beds: 63

History
- Founded: 1985

Links
- Website: www.thelisterhospital.com
- Lists: Hospitals in England

The Lister Hospital in Chelsea is a private hospital in Chelsea Bridge Road, London. It is owned by the Hospital Corporation of America, the largest private operator of health care facilities in the world, and so is not part of the National Health Service.

== History ==
Opened in 1985, the hospital occupies the former premises of the Lister Institute of Preventive Medicine; both were named in honour of Joseph Lister, 1st Baron Lister, a British surgeon considered to be the pioneer of aseptic surgery. It has 57 beds in inpatient wards on three floors and a six-bedded Critical Care Unit and specialises in orthopaedics, gynaecology, dermatology, gastroenterology, ophthalmology and plastic surgery, and also runs a fertility clinic. It generates revenue per bed of circa £1 million a year.

== Services ==
Medical cannabis is available at the hospital in a clinic operated by Mamedica.
