= Alexander Ruthven Pym =

British Army officer and Chairman of Kent County Council (1891–1971)

Alexander Ruthven Pym (7 October 1891 – 13 August 1971) was a British Army officer, farmer, and chairman of Kent County Council.

The son of Claude George Melville Pym and his wife Lucy Victoria Leslie-Melville, he was educated at Winchester College.

On 14 October 1914, Pym was commissioned into the Irish Guards on probation, having been a Cadet in the Officers Training Corps of his school. He was mentioned in despatches during the First World War and was an acting Captain from November 1917 to August 1919, then until February 1920 was aide-de-camp to the General Officer Commanding the London District. He fought again in the Second World War, rising to the rank of Major. In 1947 he was elected as a member of Kent County Council. At a meeting of the council in January 1957, he was elected an alderman. In 1963, he became vice-chairman of the County Council. A newspaper pointed out that he was a cousin of Sir Charles Pym, a former chairman of the council.

For some years, Pym was chairman of governors of the Kent Farm and Horticultural Institute, resigning in July 1963.

In October 1963, Lord Cornwallis, Lord Lieutenant of Kent, appointed Pym as one of his Deputy Lieutenants, and he became chairman of Kent County Council in May 1964. Shortly after that, Pym said he saw a need to teach everyone to make better use of leisure and stated that he was himself taking art classes.

When not serving in the army, Pym lived and farmed at Charing. He was also a Justice of the Peace for the county.

On 4 August 1921, Pym married Violet Warrender, a daughter of Vice-Admiral Sir George Warrender, 7th Baronet, and of Lady Maud Ashley-Cooper, the youngest daughter of Anthony Ashley-Cooper, 8th Earl of Shaftesbury. They had three sons, John (born 1922), killed in action in April 1943 in the Tunisian campaign, while serving as a Lieutenant in the Irish Guards; Victor (1924–2009), a clergyman; and Martin (born 1927); and one daughter, Jane (1931–1949).

Pym died on 13 August 1971, aged 79, having retired from his farm to Wakeley House, Charing. His funeral was at the Church of St Peter and St Paul, Charing, on 18 August, and was thronged.
