= Hadlow Rural Community School =

Location
- Tonbridge Road; Hadlow, Kent, TN11 0AU; England; 51.2238°N 0.3277°E

Information
- Type: Free school
- Established: 2013
- Local authority: Kent County Council
- Trust: Hadlow College
- Department for Education URN: 139697 Tables
- Ofsted: Reports
- Headteacher: Paul Boxall
- Gender: Coeducational
- Age: 11 to 16
- Website: https://www.hrcschool.org/

Hadlow Rural Community School is a coeducational secondary school located in Hadlow in the English county of Kent.

It is a free school that was established in 2013 by Hadlow College. The school is located on the grounds of the college, and is the first secondary school in Kent to offer a farm-based education for pupils.

Hadlow Rural Community School offers GCSEs as programmes of study for pupils. In addition, the school offers land-based courses in conjunction with Hadlow College.
