= UNITAR University College Kuala Lumpur =

Private university college in Malaysia

Coordinates: 3.1541541°N 101.7092343°E

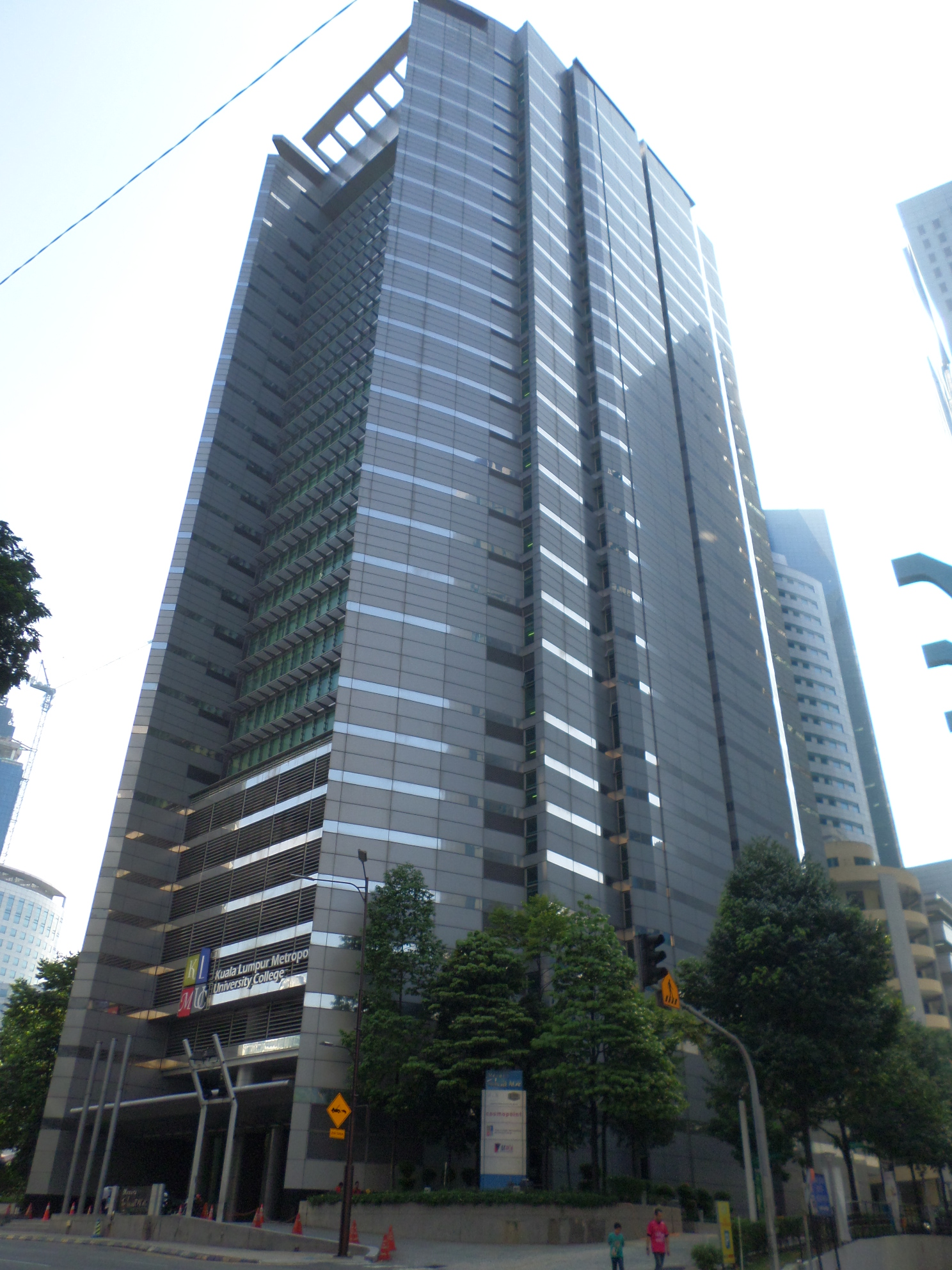
- Type: Private University College
- Established: 1991
- Location: Kuala Lumpur, Malaysia
- Website: www.unitar.my/our-locations/kuala-lumpur/

UNITAR University College Kuala Lumpur (UUCKL, Malay: Kolej Universiti Kuala Lumpur UNITAR) (formerly known as Kuala Lumpur Metropolitan University College) is a university college located in Kuala Lumpur, Malaysia. It was established in 1991. The University College currently offers 11 programmes across the fields of Management and Administration.

The degree and diploma courses are accredited by the Malaysian Qualifications Agency.

UUCKL offers a wide range of academic programs at the diploma, bachelor's, master's and PhD levels in various fields, including business, human resource, education and arts.

Some of the popular courses offered at KLMUC include the Bachelor of Business Management (Honours) and Bachelor of Human Resource Management (Honours).

== Notable alumni ==
From Kuala Lumpur Metropolitan University College:

- Eka Sharif
- Richard Huckle (did not complete his studies)
- Syafiq Yusof
