= Richard Huckle =

British convicted child sex offender (1986–2019)

- Huckle's mugshot
- Born: Richard William Huckle; 14 May 1986; Ashford, Kent, England
- Died: 13 October 2019 (aged 33); Near Full Sutton, East Riding of Yorkshire, England
- Cause of death: Stab wounds (murder)
- Education: The Harvey Grammar School; South Kent College; Kuala Lumpur Metropolitan University College
- Criminal charges: Convicted of 71 counts of serious sexual assault against children ranging from 6 months to 12 years old. The charges include: 14 counts of rape of a child under the age of 13; 5 counts of digital penetration of a child under the age of 13; 31 counts of sexual assault against a child under the age of 13; 6 counts of grooming a child; 13 counts of taking/making indecent images of children related to the 20,000 images on his laptop; 1 count of advertising indecent images of children; 1 count of arranging or facilitating child sex offences; A further 20 offences lay on file.
- Criminal penalty: Life imprisonment (minimum term of 25 years)
- Criminal status: Deceased

Richard William Huckle (14 May 1986 – 13 October 2019) was a British serial child rapist. He was arrested by Britain's National Crime Agency in 2014 after a tip-off from Task Force Argos, a highly specialised branch of Australia's Queensland Police Service responsible for the investigation of online child exploitation and abuse, and convicted in 2016 of 71 charges of sexual offences against children, committed while he worked as a teacher and a freelance photographer in Malaysia.

The gravity of Huckle's offending has resulted in his being described by the press as Britain's most depraved paedophile. On 6 June 2016, he was sentenced to life imprisonment with a minimum term of 25 years before he would be eligible for parole.

On 13 October 2019, Huckle was subjected to a prolonged torture murder in which he was tied up, beaten, strangled, sexually assaulted, and repeatedly stabbed, including having an improvised knife shoved through his nose into his brain. On 13 January 2020, a fellow inmate, 29-year-old Paul Fitzgerald, was charged with Huckle's murder. Fitzgerald, who had several previous convictions for violent and sexual offences, was sentenced to life imprisonment with a minimum term of 34 years on 24 November 2020.

== Early life ==
Richard Huckle was born into a middle-class family in Ashford, Kent, on 14 May 1986. He was educated at the Harvey Grammar School, Folkestone, where he was described as "a bit of a loner, but nothing out of the ordinary" by friends. At the age of 16, he took part in a month-long expedition to visit a school in Namibia, after which he began study at the nearby South Kent College.

Huckle was a regular worshipper at Ashford Baptist Church, where he was described as a quiet man.

He was also a member of a church in London, which he continued to attend up until the time of his re-arrest in December 2014.

== Time in Malaysia ==
After leaving education, Huckle spent a gap year in Malaysia from 2005 to 2006. He returned to the country regularly, helping out at local churches and among local communities, before moving there in 2010.

Huckle enrolled in a short CELTA (Certificate in English Language Teaching to Adults) course with the British Council before starting work as a freelance photographer in local communities around Kuala Lumpur. Hoping to further his career and status within the community, he also enrolled in an information technology (IT) study course at Kuala Lumpur Metropolitan University College. He did not complete his studies.

During the years of 2011 and 2012, Huckle did part-time photography for Nike Football Club Malaysia. There were no reports of abuse in the club. In addition to Malaysia, where all of the crimes he was convicted of occurred, Huckle is known to have kidnapped two sisters, aged 4 and 6, in Cambodia in 2006. In India, he persuaded a pastor to invite him to an orphanage in Bangalore to take photos and make videos with the children, offering to make promotional videos for the orphanage.

== Sexual offences ==
=== Background and initial arrest ===
Police officers from Task Force Argos had been aware of a network of paedophiles operating on a dark web network called The Love Zone (TLZ). They noticed one member who always made posts using the unusual greeting "hiyas" and had a distinctive freckle on one of his fingers. Officers used social media and chat rooms to track down the individual, eventually finding a Facebook page that appeared to be a match. The profile was fake but photos of a vehicle led police to Shannon McCoole, a care worker from Adelaide, South Australia. A warrant was issued for the arrest of McCoole. Upon entering his house, police discovered that McCoole was online and running his website at the time.

Police assumed the identity of McCoole and ran his site to catch other paedophiles, arresting hundreds, as well as rescuing 85 children from harm. One member that stood out was Huckle, due to the number of children he had abused and the brashness of his posts. After discovering his real identity, they learned that he was due to return to the United Kingdom to spend Christmas with his family and immediately alerted the National Crime Agency.

On 19 December 2014, Huckle was arrested by officers from Britain's National Crime Agency at London's Gatwick Airport and questioned on suspicion of serious offences against children. His arrest followed an earlier tip-off from Task Force Argos. Huckle initially refused to answer questions and was bailed under the condition that he stay at his parents' house, though his laptop was seized. The following day, he admitted the child sex abuse to his mother, who became extremely angry. She and his father immediately called the police to take him away.

Huckle had been granted bail under the conditions that he live at his parents' address while investigations were in progress. Huckle had no criminal record and was in no positions of responsibility concerning minors. The police therefore after interviewing him released him temporarily, as it would take time to analyse and retrieve evidence from seized computer equipment. In his initial police interview, Huckle made no comment throughout. On the following day, when out on bail, he was confronted by his mother about the allegations. Huckle drunkenly admitted to raping children aged three to thirteen, at which point his parents refused to allow him to remain in the house. They contacted the police and implored them to arrest him. He returned to police custody.

=== Remand and trial ===
After leaving his parents' house Huckle was re-arrested and charged with 91 counts including creation and possession of indecent images of children, rape of a child under the age of 13, digital penetration, sexual assault, and facilitating the commission of child sexual offences by creating a "paedophile manual". He was denied bail by the police and remanded to court where his next application for bail was also denied; due to the severity of the charges, Huckle was imprisoned at HMP Lewes before being transferred to HMP Belmarsh in London to await trial.

At an initial hearing at the Old Bailey, in January 2016, Huckle pleaded not guilty to all 91 charges, which took over an hour to read in court. Prosecutors started to prepare three separate trials as they did not believe a jury should be subjected to all of the graphic evidence that would be presented in a single trial. In April, during a preliminary trial hearing, Huckle pleaded guilty to 71 of the 91 charges he was facing after a request to watch all of the evidence against him in court.

During the hearings, the full scale of Huckle's crimes became apparent for the first time. The prosecution, led by Brian O'Neill QC, showed evidence of a long history of crimes that started during Huckle's gap year in 2006 and continued for eight to nine years until he was apprehended in 2014. They included rape of children under the age of 12, possession and distribution of child sexual abuse material, creation of child sexual abuse material, child abuse, creating a paedophile manual entitled "Paedophiles And Poverty: Child Lover Guide", digital penetration of a child under the age of 12, and raising money for his activities via a crowd-funding website. His victims ranged in age from 6 months to 12 years of age; one was abused while wearing a nappy, and another was abused for a number of years between the ages of 5 and 12. Huckle belonged to a website called The Love Zone on the dark web, which is obscured from general discovery and only accessible by anonymised means. On the site, he shared photos of his crimes with other members. He boasted about his crimes to other paedophiles, posting such comments as "Hit the jackpot, a three-year-old girl as loyal to me as my dog and nobody seemed to care" and "impoverished kids are definitely much easier to seduce than middle-class kids".

In a series of postings in 2013 he admitted sexually abusing four girls from the same family. He awarded himself points for sexually abusing children. Huckle wrote he wanted to marry a girl he had raped from the age of seven and have children with her, although he claimed he was "not a big fan of incest". In total, prosecutors unveiled 29 victims and more than 20,000 photos and videos, but believe there could be up to 200 victims across Southeast Asia and thousands more photos in encrypted areas of Huckle's laptop, for which Huckle refused to provide keys. Ultimately, the vast majority of child abuse on his laptop was never recovered.

The hearings revealed some of the stratagems Huckle employed to procure victims, such as taking children out on day trips from orphanages and escorting them home from their own birthday party. Huckle had even talked about marrying one of his young victims so that he could set up a foster home and abuse "a cycle of children" who would pass through his home. Huckle also created a ledger of his abuses in which he scored the scale of abuse he inflicted upon each victim. It was from this ledger that the estimated number of children abused, 200, was derived, although to date authorities have only discovered photographic evidence of the abuse of 29 children due to Huckle refusing to give officers the passwords for encrypted areas of his hard drives.

=== Extraterritorial jurisdiction ===
Huckle was prosecuted under Section 72 of the Sexual Offences Act 2003, which allows British nationals to be tried and convicted in the United Kingdom for child sex crimes committed while overseas in an effort to prevent child sex tourism, a stratagem known as extraterritorial jurisdiction and a move welcomed by child protection charities.

While no official tally is kept, Huckle was reportedly only the seventh person to be prosecuted under the measure, and his crimes were the most serious to be prosecuted under it.

== Sentencing ==
Huckle's sentencing hearing began at the Old Bailey on 1 June 2016 and lasted until 3 June 2016, with the sentence itself being passed on 6 June 2016. At the start of the hearing, the judge stated that Huckle should expect to go to prison for a very long time, as he was considering multiple life sentences due to the gravity of the offences committed.

During the sentencing hearing, Huckle's lawyer, Philip Sapsford QC, read a statement from Huckle where he blamed his crimes on his immaturity:

I really understand and acknowledge the true scale of damage it caused to the Malaysian community. I had hoped to escape this mundane life of solitude in the UK yet was overwhelmed by the attention I received in Malaysia. I completely misjudged the affections I received from these children. My low self-esteem and lack of confidence with women was no excuse for me to use these children as an outlet. I am open and eager to rehabilitate from this offending behaviour. I don't want to become a martyr to sex tourism in Malaysia. This was all my doing as a consequence of my immaturity and I'm truly remorseful.

Sapsford continued by asking the judge to take into consideration his client's young age, his claims of remorse, and the fact that he had no previous convictions. He also quoted from a psychiatric report that said Huckle had limited sexual experience with women and suffered depression as a teenager. He also stated that, despite the mitigating circumstances, this is the most extensive case of child sex crimes that he has ever been involved in.

It was also noted during the hearing, in a statement made by the prosecution, how convictions were only sought against crimes for which there was complete photographic evidence. It was noted how Huckle's ledger contained details of 200 children that had been abused but that they have been unable to access certain encrypted sections of his hard drive to obtain evidence.

At the Old Bailey on 6 June 2016, Judge Peter Rook QC sentenced Huckle to life imprisonment on 22 counts with a minimum prison term of 25 years before being eligible to apply for parole. Before passing down the sentence, the judge stated that Huckle carried out a campaign of rape and was driven by his own sexual gratification:

You have pleaded guilty to as many as 71 sexual offences. It is very rare indeed that a judge has to sentence sexual offending by one person on such a scale as this. In my view, you may well harbour feelings of regret but there is no feeling of genuine remorse in this case.

— Judge Peter Rook QC, 6 June 2016

== Aftermath and criticism ==
The National Crime Agency received criticism from the Malaysian Government, as well as several child protection charities in Malaysia, for their handling of the case. Officers from the NCA travelled to Malaysia to engage with local charities, who performed child protection workshops in the community where Huckle lived, but were not informed of the gravity of his crimes. The Malaysian Government stated that they would like further details of the victims so they can offer counselling. On 4 June 2016, the Attorney General of Malaysia, Tan Sri Mohamed Apandi Ali, stated that he was in the process of contacting his counterpart in the UK, and the British High Commissioner in Kuala Lumpur, to obtain information about the case, which would help his investigation into the crimes and his efforts to help Huckle's victims.

The National Crime Agency responded to the comments from the Malaysian authorities, stating that they revealed enough details to be able to help the charities but were unable to provide full details until the prosecution was completed. For the same reason, severe media restrictions were put in place, which prevented anybody from reporting the story until the British Government had taken steps to ensure that all of Huckle's material had been taken down and that steps had been taken to protect his victims from other predators. On 6 June 2016, however, the National Crime Agency referred itself to the police watchdog the Independent Police Complaints Commission, since they were aware of Huckle's continued attendance at two churches in the UK up until the time of his re-arrest in January 2015 but did not contact them until sentencing had already begun. The IPCC will look into whether the NCA had acted appropriately and whether more could have been done to determine whether Huckle abused any children in the UK through his relationship with the churches.

The British Council issued a statement saying that they had reviewed their dealings with Huckle:

Richard Huckle completed a Certificate in English Language Teaching to Adults (CELTA) course in 2008 which provides training to individuals to teach adult learners. Following the course, we have no records to indicate he was ever engaged as a teacher in Malaysia with us, either for adult students or children.

— British Council Press Office, a statement issued 1 June 2016

They also stated that procedures would be reviewed, but that pre-employment checks are the responsibility of future employers, not their education provider.

After the gravity of Huckle's crimes became known, the Malaysian Government set up a telephone hotline for people to call if they had any information about Huckle or if they were abused themselves. The Malaysian Prime Minister, Najib Razak, added that he was angered and saddened by Huckle's sexual violation of Malaysian children and called for all parties involved to ensure that children are not exposed to situations where irresponsible people can take advantage of them.

Following the discovery of Huckle's crimes, the Malaysian Government came under fire from child protection charities for the lack of legislation regarding child abuse and child pornography. James Nayagam, chairman of Suriana Welfare Society for Children, was particularly critical of his government's relaxed nature in dealing with such crimes:

Malaysia should make child pornography and child sexual abuse a severe crime with heavy penalties. We should also issue a severe warning at the point of entering the country about our strong stance. Huckle got away with it. He knew the relaxed atmosphere in this country. We Asians fall head over heels with foreigners. He had people fall into his trap. But regardless of where people come from, we must have that check and balance.

— James Nayagam, The Star

In August 2016, in response to the criticism, the prime minister Najib Razak formed a special task force to investigate how Malaysia's legislation could be updated to take paedophiles like Huckle into account. These efforts produced the Sexual Offences Against Children Act 2017. The act was the nation's first legislation to address child grooming, child pornography, and child rape specifically, codifying the investigative powers of the Royal Malaysian Police and prosecutorial discretion for these crimes.

While the media in the UK were largely supportive of Huckle's sentencing, the Malaysian press widely stated that the punishment was not severe enough, with statements such as "a thousand years is not enough", "We are horrified that the sex fiend [Huckle] will be eligible to appear before a parole board after 23 years", and "this monster could be out in 24 years" appearing in the days after his sentence was announced.

== Death ==
On 13 October 2019, Huckle was found dead at the age of 33 in his cell at Full Sutton prison in the East Riding of Yorkshire. It was reported that he was beaten, stabbed, and strangled repeatedly. Another prisoner was charged with his murder in January 2020.

After a trial lasting four days, Paul Fitzgerald, himself serving an indeterminate sentence for serious sexual assault, was found guilty of Huckle's murder on 23 November 2020 by a jury after only one hour of deliberation.

During the trial, further details of Huckle's murder were revealed with it being made public that Huckle endured a lengthy torture with his hands and feet bound before being gagged, strangled using electrical cable, raped, having his jaw broken, being sodomised with a kitchen utensil, and then having a pen with a blade attached stabbed into his brain via the nose.

The attack was described by the prosecution as "a prolonged attack also designed to humiliate and degrade [Huckle]". Fitzgerald, who was discovered by prison staff straddling Huckle's body and surrounded by a pool of blood, later admitted that he had wanted to cook and eat parts of Huckle's body following the attack. Fitzgerald reportedly told a psychiatrist that he planned to kill several other inmates afterwards, but was "having too much fun" attacking Huckle to stop.

On 24 November 2020, Fitzgerald was sentenced to life imprisonment with the judge stating that he must serve a minimum of 34 years in prison before being eligible for parole due to the "sadistic" and pre-meditated nature of the attack which, it was revealed during sentencing, went on for over an hour before prison staff were made aware.

== See also ==
- Yap Weng Wah
- Ian Watkins
- Hurtcore
- Child sexual abuse in the United Kingdom
- List of serial rapists
