= Peter Scully =

Australian child sex offender (born 1963)

- Mugshot of Scully in 2015
- Born: Peter Gerard Scully; 13 January 1963 (age 63); Melbourne, Australia
- Height: 1.88 m (6 ft 2 in)
- Children: 2
- Status: Incarcerated
- Criminal charges: Human trafficking, rape, child abuse
- Penalty: Life imprisonment plus 129 years

Details
- Victims: 7+ (rape and trafficking, confirmed); 1 (murder, alleged)
- Country: Philippines
- Date apprehended: 20 February 2015
- Imprisoned at: Davao Prison and Penal Farm, Panabo, Philippines

Peter Gerard Scully (born 13 January 1963) is an Australian convicted child sex offender and alleged murderer who is imprisoned for life in the Philippines after being convicted of one count of human trafficking and five counts of rape by sexual assault of children. Scully was sentenced to life imprisonment in June 2018. In November 2022, he received a second conviction and was sentenced to an additional 129 years in prison.

== Criminal activities ==
Peter Scully lived in the suburb of Narre Warren in Melbourne with his wife and two children prior to fleeing to Manila in the Philippines in 2011, before he could be charged with his involvement in a property scheme that cost investors over A$2.68 million. According to his own statement, he was sexually abused by a Catholic priest in Victoria as a child. Prior to leaving Melbourne, he operated an unlicensed online escort service, which offered his Filipino partner as a sex worker. Scully ran a real estate scheme called "The Key Result" where low credit and low income earners who would not usually qualify for a home loan paid above-market rent for a home owned by an investor, with the expectation that they would acquire the title after five years. The Key Result scheme went into liquidation in 2005 owing $2.6m. An investigation by the Australian Securities & Investments Commission from 2009 found that Scully was involved in 117 fraud and deception offenses relating to real estate scams.

=== Child sex abuse ===
From the island of Mindanao, Scully built up and headed a lucrative international child sexual abuse ring that offered pay-per-view video streams on the dark web of children being sexually abused and tortured. Among the victims who had their abuse recorded and sold over the internet was a five-year-old who was raped and tortured by Scully and two female accomplices.

Victims were procured by Scully with promises to impoverished parents of work or education, or were solicited by his two Filipino girlfriends, Carme Ann Álvarez and Liezyl Margallo Castaña, and other female acquaintances such as María Dorothea Chi y Chia. Both Álvarez and Margallo also abused children in Scully's videos. One example is in Daisy's Destruction that has been found being promoted on YouTube, showing an infant being hung upside down, tortured, and sexually abused, by an 18-year-old female.

In 2016, prosecutors alleged that Scully and a girlfriend coaxed two teenage girls to come to Scully's house with the promise of food. Scully was alleged to have given the girls alcohol and forced them to perform sex acts between them, a scene the photographer filmed. The prosecutor alleged that when the girls tried to escape, Scully forced them to dig graves in the basement of the house and threatened that he would bury them there. After five days, the girls were released by Álvarez, who began feeling remorse after coming home to see the two in pet collars and reported what had happened.

=== Dark web and Daisy's Destruction ===
Scully operated a secret dark web child sexual abuse website known as "No Limits Fun" ("NLF"). Scully produced his film, Daisy's Destruction, which he commercially sold and distributed on his site for up to US$10,000. It features the torture and rape of three girls, including an 18-month-old infant, by Scully and two Filipino women. Urged on by Scully, some of the most severe physical abuse was carried out on the children by one of his girlfriends, then 19-year-old Liezyl Margallo, who was formerly trafficked as a child.

Prior to the video gaining attention by the general public, Scully broadcast Daisy's Destruction privately on a pay-per-view basis. Due to the graphic content, it quickly garnered attention of law enforcement and media. The Dutch National Child Exploitation Team was the first to open an investigation with the goal of locating the victims. Subsequently, an international manhunt for those responsible for the video's production was launched. Scully was tracked in Malaybalay and arrested on 20 February 2015. Investigators had six warrants for his arrest, all relating to the abduction and sexual abuse of two cousins. While they searched for Scully in the Philippines, investigators tracked down the three primary victims in Daisy's Destruction. Liza (victim 1) was found to be alive as was Daisy (victim 2) who had lasting physical injuries from her severe mistreatment. According to Margallo, Scully recorded himself in a video with Cindy (victim 3), in which he raped and tortured her, then made her dig her own grave before strangling her to death with a rope.

Among those who acquired and publicized the film were two of the biggest-ever purveyors of child sexual abuse material (CSAM), Scully's fellow Australian Matthew David Graham, better known by his online pseudonym Lux, and Canadian Benjamin Faulkner. Graham, who was apprehended at age 22, ran a series of "hurtcore" child sexual abuse sites. He claimed that he had published the video on his own website "in the name of freedom". Faulkner ran multiple websites, regularly spending 16 to 18 hours a day maintaining them. On his Childs Play site in 2016, he uploaded Scully's video. Faulkner was arrested after raping a four-year-old girl and was later sentenced to life in prison.

Years later, in 2021, Daisy's Destruction resurged after it was found in the possession of American reality television star Josh Duggar.

== Criminal charges ==
Scully faced a total of 75 charges, with 7 confirmed victims of rape and trafficking. He was on trial with others who assisted in the production of his child abuse material, including four men: German Christian Rouche, Filipinos Alexander Lao and Althea Chia, and Brazilian Haniel Caetano de Oliveira. Margaret Akullo, then-Project Coordinator for the United Nations Office on Drugs and Crime and an expert on child abuse investigations, described the case as "horrific" and one of the worst she had ever heard of. His crimes were deemed so severe that some prosecutors supported the reintroduction of the death penalty as punishment for Scully, despite capital punishment being abolished in the Philippines since 2006.

In a March 2015 interview with Tara Brown on 60 Minutes, Scully said that he was writing a tell-all journal in prison where he would reflect on his motivations for raping young children.

In October 2015, a fire severely damaged the evidence room containing Scully's computer logs and videos, destroying key evidence. On 13 June 2018, Scully and his girlfriend Álvarez were sentenced to life in prison. Judge Jose Escobido also ordered Scully and Álvarez to pay 5 million PHP (almost US$87,000) to the victims.

Both Scully and his sister complained about the conditions in the jail Scully is held in.

In November 2022, he received a second conviction and was sentenced to an additional 129 years in prison. Margallo was sentenced to 126 years, and two accomplices, Alexander Lao and María Dorothea Chia, were given a 9-year sentence each. In total, there have been 60 cases filed against Scully.

The life sentences of Scully and Álvarez were upheld by the Philippines Supreme Court in 2025.

== See also ==
- Child pornography in the Philippines
- Hurtcore
- Snuff film
- List of serial rapists
