= South Kent College =

Coordinates: 51°4′54″N 1°9′58″E

South Kent College (SKC) was a college of further and higher education in southeast England. The main campus was in Folkestone, with satellites in Dover and at several sites in Ashford. Following a KPMG report in 2008 that recommended a merger, in April 2010 SKC joined West Kent College to form South & West Kent College, trading as K College.

== Campuses ==
- Ashford
  - South Kent College & Ashford Sixth Form Centre, Jemmett Road
  - Ashford School of Art & Design, Tufton Street
  - Ashford School of Art & Design, Henwood Industrial Estate
  - An "Ashford Learning Campus" was proposed, teaching up to 14,000 students from 2011. After the merger, this was replaced with a £20m plan for a new campus at the Elwick Road site in spring 2013 and the sale of the Jemmet Road site.
- Dover Campus
- Folkestone Campus

== Notable former pupils ==
- Richard Huckle, serial child sex offender
- Dominic King, radio broadcaster
