= Ashford College =

Further education school in Ashford, Kent

EKC Ashford College
- Type: Further education, higher education
- Established: August 2014
- Parent institution: EKC Group
- Principal: Susan Bonett
- Students: 1200+
- Location: Elwick Road, Ashford, Kent, TN23 1NN
- Website: www.ashfordcollege.ac.uk
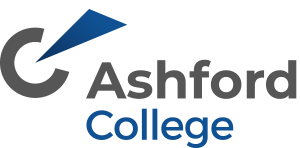

EKC Ashford College is a further education college located in Ashford, Kent, England, founded in August 2014. Since 2020 it has been a member of the East Kent Colleges (EKC) Group, which was established in 2018 to unite several colleges in East Kent under a single network. EKC Ashford College offers a variety of academic and vocational courses, including A-Levels, T Level, BTEC, NVQ Diplomas technical qualifications, apprenticeships, and adult education programs. The college provides education in diverse fields such as business, engineering, health and social care, digital and creative arts, and more.

== History ==
Ashford College was founded in 2014 as a result of the split of K College. Prior to this, the Jemmett Road campus was part of South Kent College. Following a 2008 KPMG report that recommended a merger, South Kent College joined West Kent College in April 2010 to form South & West Kent College, which traded as K College.

Ashford College relocated from its original location on Jemmett Road to Elwick Road in September 2017 after a £26 million construction project. A state-of-the-art recording studio was launched in June 2018, available to students and public hire. The 40-channel facility was officially opened by Eastenders star Shaun Williamson.

Ashford college was taken over by EKC Group in April 2020, when it was acquired from the West Kent and Ashford College corporation.

It was announced in November 2021 that Ashford College's bid for the government's Post-16 Capacity Fund had been successful, and finished construction in 2023 The multi-million pound injection was to increase capacity by 250 students through the completion of the College's 'Phase 2' development. This saw an additional wing constructed to house Information Technology, Engineering and Business classrooms alongside extended College administration facility.
