= Hurtcore =

Extreme form of child pornography

Hurtcore, a portmanteau of the words "hardcore" and "hurt", is a name given to a particularly extreme form of child sexual assault material, usually involving degrading violence, bodily harm, and torture. Eileen Ormsby, Australian writer and author of The Darkest Web, described hurtcore as "a fetish for people who get aroused by the infliction of pain, or even torture, on another person who is not a willing participant". An additional motivation for the perpetrator, next to their position of power over their victims, can be the reaction of their victims to the physical abuse, like crying or screaming in pain. This reaction can stimulate the arousal of the perpetrator even more.

Some dark web forums are dedicated to the discussion, and sharing of images and videos, of hurtcore. In 2013, Vice called Hurt2theCore "the dark web's most notorious hurtcore site", run by Matthew Graham, who became known as the "King of Hurtcore", as well as "one of the biggest child pornography and hurtcore distributors in the world". The case of Matthew Falder was the UK National Crime Agency's first successful hurtcore prosecution.

== Notable arrests ==
- Matthew Alexander Falder – Englishman who, from a period of time between 2009 and 2017, coerced his victims online into sending him degrading images of themselves or into committing crimes against a third person such as rape or assault. He managed this by making threats to the victim by saying that he would send their family or friends degrading information or revealing pictures of them (which he usually obtained earlier by obtaining a false trust with the victim) if they did not comply with his commands. Falder hid behind anonymous accounts on the web and then re-posted the images to gain a higher status on the dark web. Investigators said that he "revelled" in getting images to share on hurtcore websites. The National Crime Agency (NCA), which was part of an international investigation, described him as "one of the most prolific and depraved offenders they had ever encountered." Falder pleaded guilty to 137 charges from 46 complainants, making him one of the UK's most prolific convicted sex offenders. In February 2018, he was jailed for 32 years and ordered to serve a further six years on extended licence. The Court of Appeal later reduced the term of imprisonment to 25 years, with an extended license of 8 years.
- Matthew David Graham – Australian man who, under the screen name "Lux", operated multiple hurtcore websites from his bedroom at his parents' house in the Melbourne suburb of South Morang when he was between the ages of 19 and 21. Graham's websites, including "Hurt2theCore", specialized in images and videos depicting the sadistic sexual abuse, rape, and torture of very young children. The largest distributor of hurtcore in the world, Graham faced 13 charges, the most severe of which involved encouraging the rape and murder of a child in Russia and the abuse of a disabled and mute child in the UK. In 2016, Graham was sentenced to 15 years in jail.
- Peter Gerard Scully – Australian man who, from the Filipino island of Mindanao, built up and headed a lucrative international child sexual abuse ring that offered pay-per-view video streams on the dark web of children being sexually abused and tortured. Among the victims who had their ordeals recorded and sold over the internet was a five-year-old who was raped and tortured by Scully and two female accomplices, Carmen Alvarez and Liezyl Magallo. Scully is infamous for producing Daisy's Destruction, a series of four videos depicting the rape and torture of an 18-month-old infant and her two sisters. Scully's victims were procured by him with promises to impoverished parents of work or education, or were solicited by Alvarez and Castaña. Scully was imprisoned for life in the Philippines after being convicted of one count of human trafficking and five counts of rape by sexual assault of children. Scully was sentenced to life imprisonment in June 2018. In November 2022, he received a second conviction and was sentenced to an additional 129 years in prison.

== See also ==
- Child pornography
- Cybersex trafficking
- Dark web
- Deep web
- Monkey hate
- Livestreamed crime
- Sex trafficking
- Sextortion
- Snuff film
