= Matthew David Graham =

Australian criminal

- Born: 21 September 1992 (age 34); Melbourne, Australia
- Years active: 2012-2014
- Status: Incarcerated
- Criminal charge: Child pornography
- Penalty: 15 years and 6 months + 10 years non-parole

Details
- Date apprehended: 26 August 2014
- Imprisoned at: Melbourne Assessment Prison

Matthew David Graham (born 21 September 1992), also known as "Lux" online, is an Australian man known for being the owner of the "Hurt2theCore" website, along with other websites under "PedoEmpire" such as "Love2theCore" (a non-hurtcore splinter), "L2TC Chat", "PedoWiki", "open_PedoForum", "PedoChat", "No Limits Pedo Chat" and more. He was arrested on 26 August 2014 in a joint sting operation by the Victoria Police, the FBI, Canadian police, Australian Federal Police, Europol and Interpol. He was originally charged with 88 child exploitation charges, which was reduced to 13. Psychiatrist Adam Deacon said Graham's motivation was the "ego boost". On 17 March 2016, he was sentenced to 15 years and 6 months in prison with a non-parole period of 10 years.

He describes himself as asexual and doesn't consider himself a paedophile. Psychiatrist Adam Deacon said he developed a "secondary paedophilia".

== Early life ==
Graham was born in the Melbourne, Victoria suburb Epping, then later moved to South Morang. He went to Greensborough Primary School in his youth, then later Epping Secondary College where he was a relatively normal boy. His family and friend(s) described him as "quiet and polite" and had no criminal behavior.

Late in his secondary school, around 15, he began isolating himself. He has Asperger's, and during year 12 he was diagnosed with schizoid personality disorder, depression, and social anxiety which he began taking medication for. Despite this, he still did well on his VCE and got into La Trobe University, studying nanotechnology, but soon dropped out due to pressure.

Graham spent most of his time in his bedroom playing World of Warcraft, and would not come out of his room or interact with his parents. His parents tried to get him treatment through a psychologist for his social anxiety, but to no avail. He was also a babysitter for his neighbour's children, but no sexual abuse took place.

He browsed the anonymous imageboard 4chan at the same time Anonymous launched Operation Darknet. Graham was intrigued by Anonymous and curious about the dark web. Originally just wanting to get recognition and respect for his skills in technology, he ended up in child pornography spaces.

== Criminal activities ==
=== Daisy's Destruction ===
Around 2011-2013, there were rumours surrounding a video called "Daisy's Destruction" — a video of an 18-month-old girl named Daisy, violently abused by a masked woman for sexual pleasure. Graham, being the "King of Hurtcore", decided to seek out this video to redistribute it on his "Hurt2theCore" website.

He ended up contacting a person from "No Limits Fun" named "Exciteagirl" (Note: Said to be Liezyl Margallo) to make a deal with. He offered $900 for the film, but that wasn't enough and was asked for $10,000 instead. This was completely out of Graham's budget, and he wasn't planning on asking his members for money, so he had to decline. Graham managed to grab some of the film split into four parts, and redistributed it on his websites for free.

Graham's relationship with NLF were soured. He said on a forum,

"Those NLF guys deserved me leaking DD. They were whiny bitches,"

Clips of this film continue to be distributed on the dark web and the clear web in the present day. It is said he did this "In the name of freedom", but also for website traffic.
