= La Tante Claire =

- Interactive map of La Tante Claire

Restaurant information
- Established: 1977; 49 years ago
- Closed: 2003; 23 years ago
- Head chef: Pierre Koffmann
- Food type: French cuisine
- Dress code: Dress jacket and tie required
- Rating: Michelin Guide
- Location: Royal Hospital Road, London, United Kingdom
- Coordinates: 51°29′8″N 0°9′44″W
- Other locations: The Berkeley, Knightsbridge

La Tante Claire (The Aunt Claire) was a restaurant in Chelsea, London, which opened in 1977. Owned and operated by Pierre Koffmann, it gained three Michelin stars in 1983, and held all three until the restaurant moved premises in 1998.

== Description ==
La Tante Claire opened in 1977 at Royal Hospital Road, Chelsea. The signature dish of the restaurant was pig's trotter with chicken mousseline, sweetbreads and morels; which when served elsewhere by Marco Pierre White, are referred to as "Pig's Trotters Pierre Koffmann". Within six years of opening, the restaurant gained its third Michelin star.

The restaurant moved from the original premises in 1998, to a location within The Berkeley hotel. In the new location, the restaurant lost its third Michelin star and was reduced to two before closing in 2003. Following the closure of the Royal Hospital Road restaurant, the premises were sold to Gordon Ramsay and became his flagship restaurant, Restaurant Gordon Ramsay.

In 2009, Koffmann opened a pop-up restaurant at Selfridges in London using the menu items from La Tante Claire. In 2010, Koffmann opened his first full-time restaurant since La Tante Claire, Koffmann's, at The Berkeley hotel, the same hotel as La Tante Claire used to be at, although at a different location within the hotel.

== Reception ==
John Wells, writing in 1994 for The Independent, praised the quality of the food at La Tante Claire, Royal Hospital Road, saying "I had a croustade de pommes caramelisees à l'Armagnac. Everything about them spoke of inspired and loving work in the kitchen", although found the prices surprisingly high, "we were given the menu to look at, which even to a spoilt restaurant critic comes as a shock. The cheapest starter is £19."

In 2002, Jan Moir of The Daily Telegraph praised the decor and the staff of La Tante Claire at The Berkeley while comparing the lunch menus of London restaurants with two Michelin stars. Additional praise was given to the wine list, and the side dish that came with the main course.

== See also ==
- List of French restaurants
