= Matt Graham-Williams =

New Zealand Rugby player

- Born: 16 August 2000 (age 26) Kaeo, New Zealand
- Height: 187 cm (6 ft 2 in)
- Weight: 115 kg (18 st 2 lb; 254 lb)
- School: Saint Kentigern College

Rugby union career
- Position: Prop
Senior career
Years	Team	Apps	(Points)
2021–2024	Tasman	9	(0)
- Correct as of 29 September 2024

Matt H. Graham-Williams (born 16 August 2000) is a New Zealand rugby union player. His position is Prop.

== Career ==
Graham-Williams was born in the small far north town of Kaeo. He was named in the Tasman Mako squad for the 2021 Bunnings NPC as a development player. Graham-Williams made his debut for Tasman against Bay of Plenty at Trafalgar Park in a non competition match, starting in the number 1 jersey in a 26–9 win for the Mako. The side went on to make the premiership final before losing 23–20 to Waikato.
