= Childs Play (website) =

Defunct Canadian child pornography website

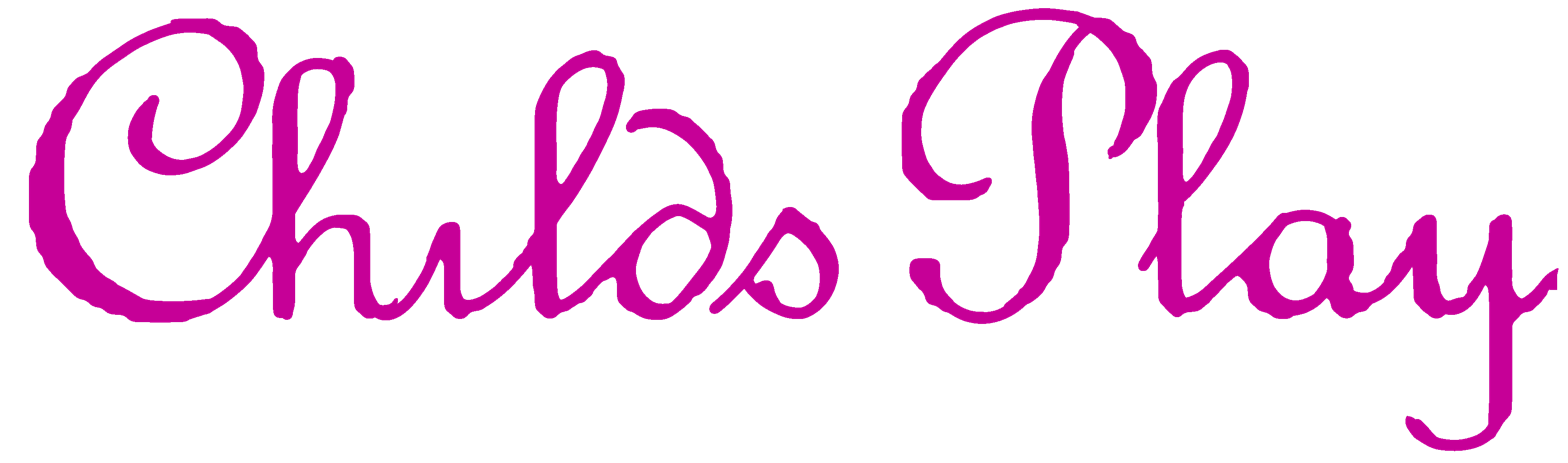
- Website type: Child sexual abuse material sharing
- Available in: English
- Launched: April 2016
- Current status: Offline

Childs Play [sic] was a Canadian website on the darknet featuring child pornography that operated from April 2016 to September 2017, which at its peak was the largest of its class. The site was concealed by being run as a hidden service on the Tor network. After running the site for the first six months, owner Benjamin Faulkner of North Bay, Ontario, Canada, was captured by the United States Department of Homeland Security. For the remaining eleven months the website was owned and operated by the Australian Queensland Police Service's Task Force Argos, as part of Operation Artemis.

== Police backlash ==
The website was run by Australian police for 11 months, and involved impersonation of the forum owner WarHead (Faulkner's alias), which required police to regularly post child abuse images, in order to convince users that the site was not compromised. Ivar Stokkereit, a legal adviser to the United Nations Children's Fund (UNICEF) in Norway, stated this was "a clear violation of the UN Convention on the Rights of the Child, even though the police’s intention is to prevent new offenses in the long run". Amnesty International also criticized the actions as "unacceptable under human rights law". ECPAT (End Child Prostitution in Asian Tourism) supported the proactive approach taken by Task Force Argos.

James Sheptycki, professor in criminology at York University, criticized the transfer of the website from its original server in Europe to Australia as "jurisdiction shopping", being done due to the favourable legal framework in Australia that would allow the website to continue running in this way.

== Convictions ==
The capture of the site, and its subsequent use to gather information, has led to arrests and convictions:

- Benjamin Faulkner and his associate, Patrick Falte, were captured together in Virginia in October 2016 two days after raping a four-year-old girl. Falte had been an administrator on The GiftBox Exchange, another darknet child exploitation site that was shut down in November 2016. Both were sentenced to life imprisonment for the rape of the girl and subsequently sentenced to 35 years for engaging in a child exploitation enterprise.
- Andrew R. Leslie, of Middleburg, Florida, was sentenced to 30 years in prison for engaging in a child exploitation enterprise, where he was a VIP member of The Giftbox Exchange. Leslie also operated another darknet child exploitation network that featured videos of severe violent sexual abuse of children, and in March 2018 was sentenced to an additional 60 years in prison for sexual abuse and production of child sexual abuse of infants and toddlers.
- Brett A. Bedusek, of Cudahy, Wisconsin, was sentenced to 20 years in prison for engaging in a child exploitation enterprise and violation of previous supervised release for the same type of offense. All four aforementioned offenders were in addition sentenced to a lifetime of supervised release.
- Site administrator Tyler David Walker, a 21-year-old Canadian, was initially arrested on the matter in March 2017, and sentenced to five years in prison.
- Site user Robert Zitzelsperger, a former science teacher in Sydney.

== Media portrayals ==
In November 2019 the Canadian network CBC in collaboration with Norwegian VG (Verdens Gang) published a six-part podcast called Hunting Warhead, chronicling the investigation by VG journalist Håkon Høydal and a Norwegian computer security expert of child sexual abuse networks on the dark web. In the course of the six episodes, CBC journalist Daemon Fairless examines the background of Benjamin Faulkner and the course of events that led to his capture.
