= East Kent College =

Further education college in Kent, England

Coordinates: 51°21′15″N 1°26′6″E

EKC Broadstairs College
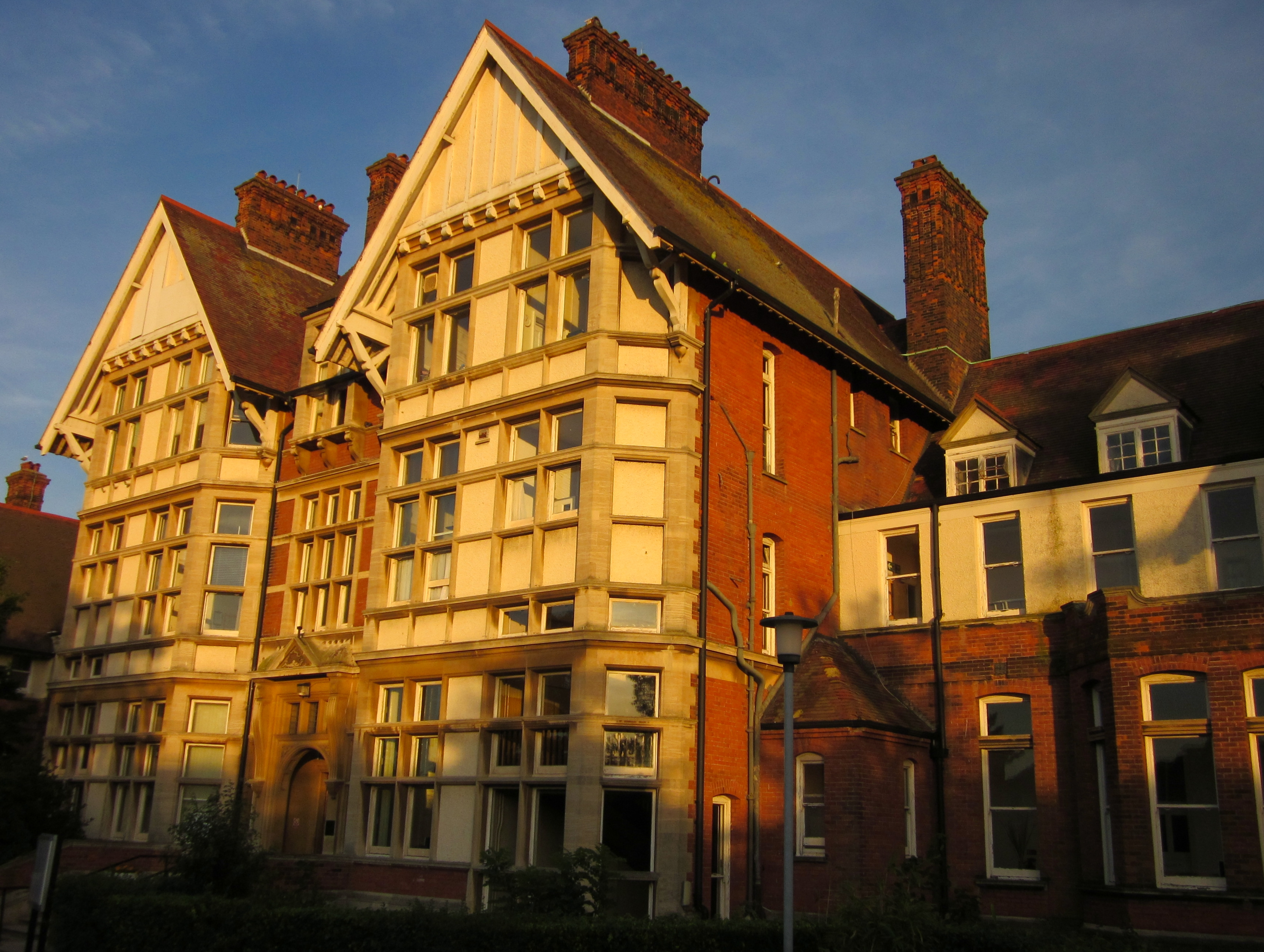
- Yarrow building at sunset
- Former names: Thanet Technical College, Thanet College, East Kent College
- Motto: Your College. Your Future.
- Principal: Paul Owen
- Location: Broadstairs, Kent, United Kingdom
- Website: https://www.ekcgroup.ac.uk/colleges/broadstairs-college

EKC Broadstairs College is a further education college (although also provides higher education courses) located in Broadstairs, Kent, on the southeast coast of the United Kingdom.

The main campus is located on Ramsgate Road, Broadstairs. In September 2011 the college had hoped to move into purpose-built buildings at Millennium Way, Westwood on the outskirts of the town, but due to the LSC building program being overcommitted the planned move never occurred. The college is currently refurbishing existing buildings to provide better facilities for students. In September 2012, Thanet College was renamed to East Kent College.

== Campuses ==
The college has one main campus that has fifteen buildings, that were named after coastal bays in Thanet (such as Minnis, Pegwell, and Kingsgate) but have been renamed after the values of the newly named College (including Enterprise, Inspire, and Achieve). The building located at the front of the site is the exception, known as "Yarrow". The Yarrow building is now a hotel owned and operated by East Kent College a commercial hotel providing real world work experiences for its students from catering, hospitality, business, events, supported internships, travel and hospitality and learning for life. It was named after shipbuilder Sir Alfred Yarrow, who provided funds for the construction of the building as a children’s convalescent home in 1895. Thanet Technical College took ownership of the site in the 1950s.

Over the years, East Kent College has had a number of satellite campuses and currently runs an external construction centre located at Hornet Close in Broadstairs where construction-based vocational courses are delivered, a Business site based at Invicta Way, Manston Business Park, Manston which provides training for employers, also small outreach sites, one based at Mill Lane House in Margate as part of the Community Education programme.

=== K College Closure ===
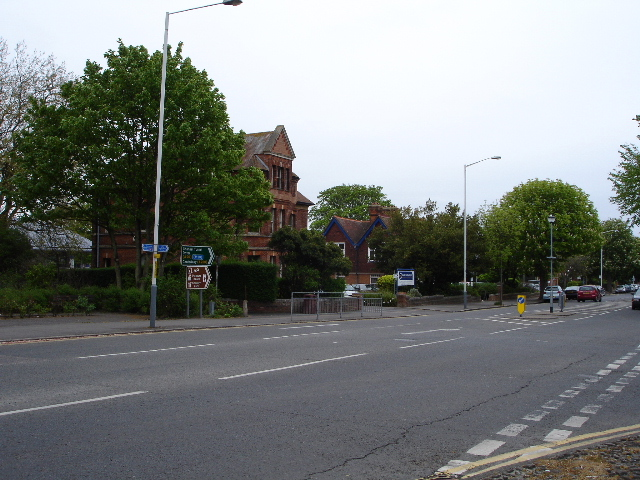
Folkestone campus.

East Kent College merged with the former Folkestone and Dover campuses of K College on 1 August 2014.

== Corporate links ==
East Kent College has close links with local companies across all 4 campuses. These include companies such as Pfizer in Sandwich, P&O Ferries and Thorley Taverns (pubs, hotels and hospitality), The Port of Dover (various sectors and apprenticeship development, and Leaf Hotels. The college has a dedicated department working closely with local employers and businesses to support the development of skills shortages across the area.

== Notable alumni ==
- Captain William Victor Edwards (1887-1917), Irish rugby player, Irish swimming champion and water polo player, first man to swim across Belfast Lough.
- Richard Davis (1966-2003), English cricketer who represented Kent, Warwickshire, Gloucestershire, Sussex, Leicestershire and Berkshire.
- Gary Rhodes (1960-2019), TV chef and restaurateur, met his wife whilst a student at the college in the 1970s.
