= Royal Hospital Road =

Street in Chelsea, London

Coordinates: 51°29′13″N 0°9′36″W

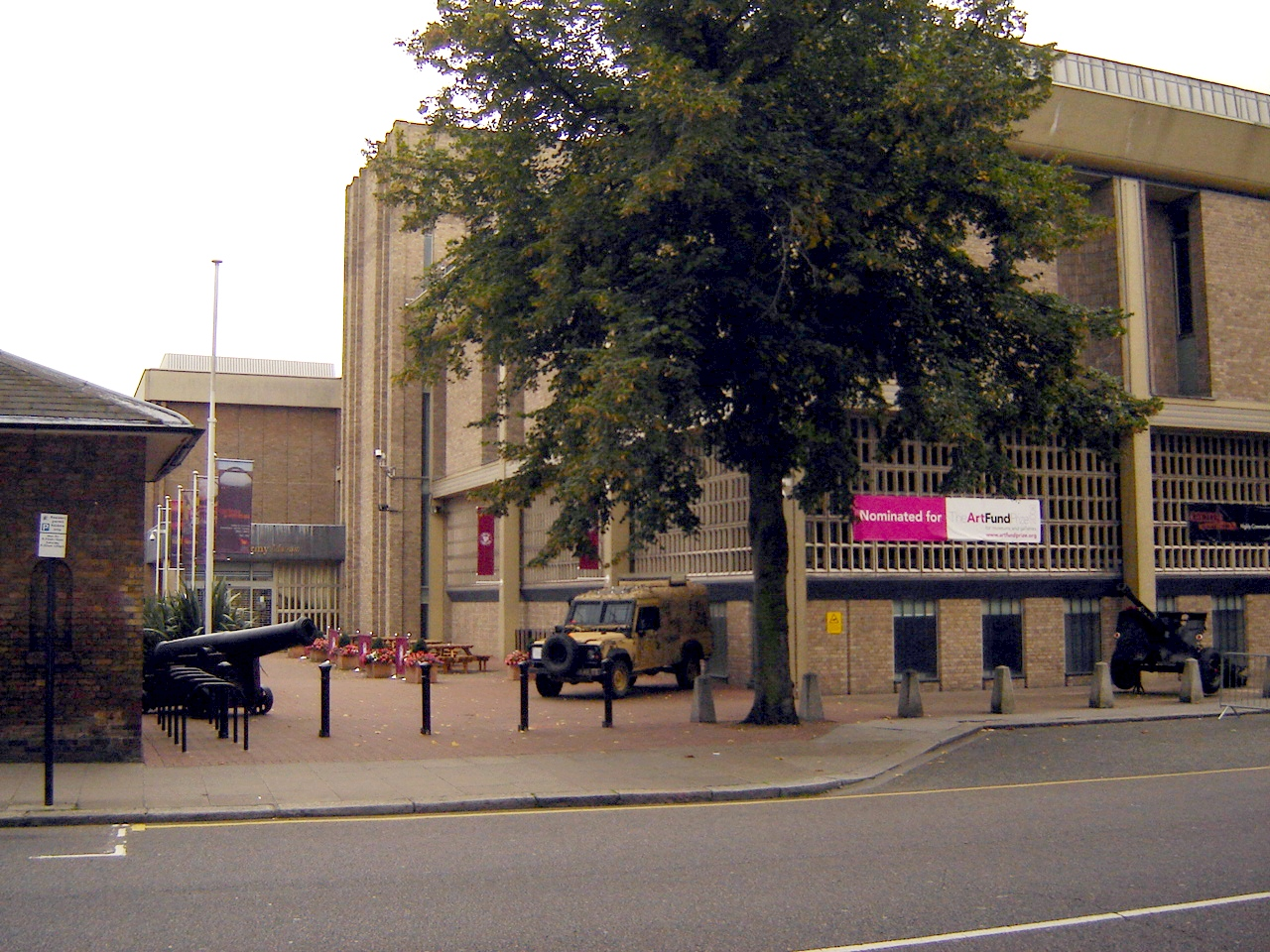
The main entrance of the National Army Museum from Royal Hospital Road.

Royal Hospital Road is a street in Chelsea, London, England. It runs between Chelsea Embankment on the north bank of the River Thames to the southwest and a junction with Lower Sloane Street, Pimlico Road and Chelsea Bridge Road to the northeast. Also adjacent are Tite Street to the south and Flood Street to the north. The road is designated the B302. The closest train station is Sloane Square to the north along Lower Sloane Street.

To the southwest of Royal Hospital Road is the Royal Hospital Chelsea, hence the name. The National Army Museum is located next to the Royal Hospital Chelsea. To the south is the Chelsea Physic Garden. Restaurant Gordon Ramsay is at 68 Royal Hospital Road, formerly the site of another Michelin 3-starred restaurant, La Tante Claire.
