= North Kent College =

College of Further and Higher Education

Coordinates: 51°25′57″N 0°12′14″E

- Kent, England

Information
- Former names: Dartford College of Education; North West Kent College
- Type: Further education college
- Established: 1960
- Department for Education URN: 130725 Tables
- Ofsted: Reports
- Principal: Billy Collard
- Enrollment: 6,000
- Campus: Dartford; Gravesend; Tonbridge; SusCon; Hadlow
- Website: http://www.northkent.ac.uk/

North Kent College is a college of Further and Higher Education located across campuses in Dartford, Gravesend, and Tonbridge in Kent, England, with Partner College status with the University of Greenwich, particularly the Greenwich Maritime Institute. Its original constituents include the Gravesend Technical College and the National Sea Training School (NSTC). They also own Hadlow College based near Tonbridge - Kent's only rural and land-based college.

Each campus has a different specialist area, however Computing and Information Technology, Foundation Studies, Hair and Beauty, Office Administration, Secretarial Studies and Sport and Leisure Management are covered at both the Dartford and Gravesend campuses.

== Locations ==
=== Dartford Campus ===
Oakfield Lane, Dartford is the location of the largest campus. It houses the main administration centre and the greatest number of students, including most of the college's Higher Education work. It specialises in Access to Higher Education, Accounting, Art and Design, Business, Management and Retail Studies, Professional Care, Media, Multimedia, Performing Arts, Photography, Public Services and Sport.

=== Gravesend Campus ===
Dering Way, Gravesend is the second largest campus. Specialises in Air Conditioning, Construction and Building Services, Electrical and Mechanical Engineering, Electronics, Hotel and Catering, Motor Vehicle, Refrigeration and Travel and Tourism.

=== Tonbridge Campus ===
Brook Street, Tonbridge Located just across from Judd School, they specialise in Travel and Tourism, Hair and Beauty, Public Service, Early Years, Photography, Construction, Business, Acting, E-Sports, Higher Education, Sports, Functional Skills.

=== SusCon Centre ===
SusCon is a sustainable construction training and research centre used to demonstrate sustainable building materials, technologies and techniques.

=== The Learning Shop, Bluewater ===
The Learning Shop is a joint initiative between the college, the Department for Work and Pensions and Bluewater Shopping Centre, aiming to support the local community with workplace skills, such as Customer Service Training, C.V Writing and Support with Retail Interview Techniques.

=== National Maritime Training Centre, Gravesend ===
The National Maritime Training Centre covers a range of areas, including;

- Bridge Team and Maritime First Aid
- Fire Fighting
- Marine Engineering
- Seamanship

== Student Facilities ==
=== Refectories and 'Student Zones' ===
Both the Dartford and Gravesend and Tonbridge Campuses contain large eating areas open to all students at the college, as well as corner shops

There are also 'Student Zones' in the refectories offering Pool and Table Tennis facilities.

=== NKC Students Union ===
All students are encouraged to take part in the Students Union, and their 'Learner Voice' initiative which encourages students to share their views on how to make the college a better place.

== Public Facilities ==
All the campuses including Dartford, Gravesend and Tonbridge campuses contain a large number of facilities which are open to students and the public.

=== Bright Beginnings nurseries and preschools ===
Both the Dartford and Gravesend campuses contain purpose built childcare facilities focusing on creating a health educational environment for children.

=== Lee Stafford Hair Salons ===
There are hair and beauty salons located at Dartford, Gravesend and Tonbridge campuses which are run by students at the college.

=== Miskin Radio ===
Miskin Radio is a radio station run by media students at the college to provide them with a lifelike working environment. It focuses on the North Kent areas.

=== Miskin Theatre ===
The Miskin Theatre is located within the Dartford Campus and Tonbridge Campus and provides training for young actors, musicians, dancers and technicians.

=== The Gallery restaurant and The View Restaurant ===
The Gallery restaurant is situated at the Gravesend Campus and The View Restaurant is located at the Tonbridge Campus and offers food prepared and served by students at the college.

== Notable facts ==
The college has had a number of notable alumni, including;

- Gemma Arterton
- Neil Maskell
- Dominic Power
- Ashley McKenzie
- Krystal Versace
