= Restaurant Gordon Ramsay =

Restaurant in London, England

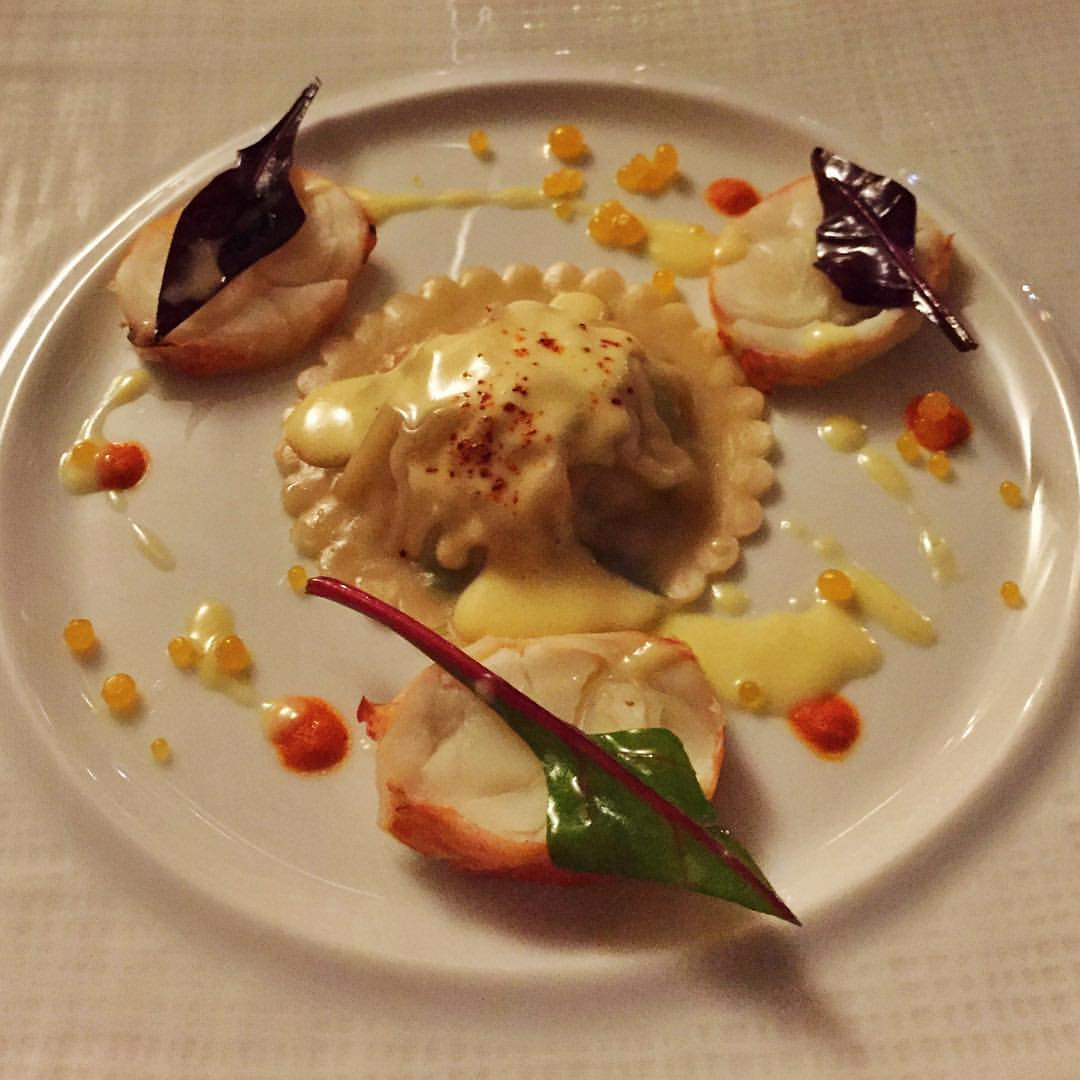
- A ravioli dish at the restaurant

- Location within Royal Borough of Kensington and Chelsea

Restaurant information
- Established: September 17, 1998; 27 years ago
- Owner: Gordon Ramsay
- Head chef: Kim Ratcharoen
- Food type: French
- Dress code: Business smart
- Rating: (Michelin Guide); AA Rosettes
- Location: 68 Royal Hospital Road, London, SW3 4HP, United Kingdom
- Coordinates: 51.4855°N 0.1620°W
- Seating capacity: 45 covers
- Reservations: Three months in advance
- Other information: No children’s menu
- Website: Official website

Restaurant Gordon Ramsay, also known as Gordon Ramsay at Royal Hospital Road, is the signature restaurant of the British celebrity chef Gordon Ramsay at Royal Hospital Road, in Chelsea, London. It opened in 1998 and was Ramsay's first solo restaurant.

In 2001, it was awarded three Michelin stars, and in 2026 Ramsay celebrated 25 years with all three. In March 2013, the restaurant reopened following an art deco redesign under chef patron Clare Smyth. In 2020, Matt Abé took over as chef patron, running the restaurant as part of Ramsay's restaurant group. Kim Ratcharoen is the head chef.

== Description ==
Gordon Ramsay opened Restaurant Gordon Ramsay in 1998, as his first solo restaurant. The location previously housed the Michelin-starred restaurant La Tante Claire.

Restaurant Gordon Ramsay gained its third Michelin star in 2001, making Ramsay the first Scottish chef to have done so. In September 2006, a £1.5 million refurbishment was completed. In 2020, Matt Abé was appointed chef patron.

== Reception ==
In 2002, Giles Coren visited Restaurant Gordon Ramsay for lunch while writing for Times Online. He found that the meal had its good and bad points, saying "Perhaps the 'best restaurant in Britain' can only disappoint. Perhaps if I want magic I should wait for Paul Daniels to open a restaurant." However, he gave scores of nine for execution, eight for service, and seven for "mind-blowing tingliness". Terry Durack of The Independent reviewed the restaurant in 2009, describing the food as "classic cooking; sophisticated, well edited and flavour-first." He gave Restaurant Gordon Ramsay a score of 16 out of 20.

In 2009, the restaurant dropped out of the S.Pellegrino World's 50 Best Restaurants for the first time, and failed to make the top 100. The 2011 edition of Harden's lists Restaurant Gordon Ramsay in seventeenth place in London in the "most mentioned" league table, a drop from ninth place in the previous year. It also ranked the restaurant in one of the top two spots in the "most disappointing cooking" category. Harden's had previously listed the restaurant as the most overpriced in the UK. The 2011 edition of The Good Food Guide listed Restaurant Gordon Ramsay as the second-best in the country, behind the Fat Duck in Bray, Berkshire, and describes it as "the nearest thing to a world-class restaurant experience" in London.

== See also ==
- List of Michelin 3-star restaurants
- List of Michelin 3-star restaurants in the United Kingdom
