= Ballerino (disambiguation) =

A ballerino is a male ballet dancer.

Ballerino may also refer to:

== People ==
- Bartolo Ballerino (born 1830), convicted purveyor of prostitutes in Los Angeles
- Louella Ballerino (née Smith; 1900–1978), U.S. fashion designer
- Mike Ballerino (1901–1965), U.S. boxer

== Arts and entertainment ==
- Ballerino (exhibition), a photographic exhibition by U.S. artist David-Simon Dayan
- The Ballerino (film), a 2011 film by Hrag Yedalian
- "The Ballerinos" (episode), a 2018 series 4 number 12 episode 57 of Matilda and the Ramsay Bunch; see List of Matilda and the Ramsay Bunch episodes
- "The Ballerino" (act), an act in the 1909 musical comedy stageplay The Beauty Spot

=== Songs ===
- "Ballerino" (song), a 1997 song by Tony Tommaro off the album Monnezzarium
- "Ballerino" (song), a 2007 single by Leessang
- "Ballerino" (song), a 2017 song written by Andrew Horowitz

== Other uses ==
- Ballerino (font), a typeface by International Typeface Corporation

== See also ==
- primo ballerino, the male version of the prima ballerina ballet dancer
- primo ballerino or principal dancer
- primo ballerino or danseur étoile (star dancer)
- Ballerina (disambiguation)
