= 2008 New York Underground Film Festival =

These are the films shown at the 15th New York Underground Film Festival, held from April 2–8, 2008.

Film name	Director	Type	Length	Notes
1956	Jenny Stark	Documentary Video	7:30	
4 Films in 5 Minutes	Skizz Cyzyk	Experimental 16mm	6:00	
4 Ways he tried to tell you	Jennet Thomas	Experimental Video	6:00	
Adventure Poseidon, The	Anne Mcguire	Feature 35mm On Video	117:00	New York Premiere
America's Biggest Dick	Bryan Boyce	Short Video	3:00	
Amy Goodrow: Tape 5925	Eileen Maxson	Experimental Video	6:00	
Andre the Giant Has A Posse	Helen Stickler	Documentary Video	20:00	
Armored Cars: Protect Yourself from Ballistic Attacks	Angie Waller	Experimental Video	8:26	
Beirut Outtakes	Peggy Ahwesh	Experimental 16mm On Video	7:00	
Broad Day	Kevin Jerome Everson	Short 16mm	1:00	
CALIFORNIA/blue	Abbey Williams	Experimental Video	7:27	
Call and Response	Aaron Valdez	Experimental Video	3:24	
Cats and Pants	Jennifer Matotek	Short Video	1:00	
Chapters 1-12 of R. Kelly's Trapped in the Closet Synced and Played Simultaneously	Michael Bell-Smith	Experimental Video	5:00	
Chronicles	Kirsten Stoltmann	Experimental Video	12:45	
Crack	Jon Moritsugu	Experimental 16mm	1:00	
Decision 80	Jim Finn	Experimental Video	10:00	
Degradation #1: X-ray: Part 2, Government Radiation	James June Schneider	Experimental 16mm	3:30	
Destiny Manifesto	Martha Colburn	Animation 16mm On Video	8:00	
Deviant	James Fotopoulos	Experimental Video	2:52	
Dirty Pictures	John Smith	Experimental Video	14:00	
Discoveries on the Forrest Floor 1-3	Charlotte Pryce	Experimental 16mm	4:00	
Don't Be a Stranger	James Fotopoulos	Experimental Video	1:00	
Don't Forget About Me	James Fotopoulos	Experimental Video		
Drowning	James Fotopoulos	Experimental 16mm	3:00	
East of the TarPits	Gary LeGault	Feature Video	74:00	International Premiere
Every (Text, Image, Sound, Movie) on My Cell Phone	Darrin Martin	Experimental Video	7:40	
False Future	Matthew Buckingham	Experimental 16mm	10:00	
Faustus's Children	David Jones, Tim Jackson, Michele O'Marah	Feature Video	43:00	
Figures in the Landscape	Thomas Comerford	Experimental 16mm	11:00	
Foggy Mountains Breakdown More Than Non-Foggy Mountains	Jessie Stead	Feature Video	59:00	
Hambone	Steve Hall, Cathee Wilkins	Experimental Video	3:00	
HANES	Mark Ther	Experimental Video	4:50	
Harmony	Jim Trainor	Animation 16mm	12:00	
Heavy Metal in Baghdad	Eddy Moretti, Suroosh Alvi	Documentary Video	84:00	New York Premiere
Hobbit Love is the Greatest Love	Steve Reinke	Experimental Video	14:00	
Hommes a Femmes	Gerard Byrne	Experimental 16mm On Video	40:00	
Hoopeston	Thomas Bender	Documentary Video	78:00	International Premiere
House	Ben Rivers	Experimental 16mm	5:00	
How to Behave or: A Story of Kindness	Tran Van Thuy	Experimental 16mm On Video	43:00	
Huge Flag	Jessie Stead	Experimental Video	12:00	
Hymn of Reckoning	Kent Lambert	Experimental Video	7:00	
I Am The Fred Astaire of Karate	Tommy Button	Experimental Video	3:15	
I Was a Teenage Serial Killer	Sarah Jacobson	Short 16mm	27:00	
I-Be Area	Ryan Trecartin	Feature Video	108:00	
i.Mirror	Cao Fei	Documentary Video	28:00	
Inside, Outside, Upside Down		Short Video		International Premiere
Internet Alphabet	Joe Nanashe	Experimental Video	6:32	
Interplay	Robert Todd	Experimental 16mm	7:00	
It Only Takes a Second	Found Footage Festival	Short 16mm On Video	4:00	
JME in MySpace: Tropical Feelings	Lev Kalman, Whitney Horn	Documentary Video	3:51	
Junky	Tony Nittoli	Experimental 16mm On Video	5:00	
Kenedi is Getting Married	Želimir Žilnik	Feature Video	80:00	US Premiere
Key to the City	Kevin Jerome Everson	Short 16mm	1:45	
King of Porn	Jeff Krulik	Documentary Video	7:00	
Kittypie	Jennifer Macmillan	Experimental Super-8 On Video	4:00	
Light is Waiting	Michael Robinson	Experimental Video	7:00	
Little Flags	Jem Cohen	Experimental 16mm On Video	7:00	
Looks Like It's Going to Rain	Ken Nordine	Experimental Audio	3:29	
Lovely Andrea	Hito Steyerl	Experimental Video	30:00	
Market sentiments	Barbara Musil	Experimental Video	4:00	
Michael Dancing On New Year's Eve, 1985	Michael Lucid	Documentary Video	1:36	
Mild People in Aggressive T-shirts	Lyn Elliot	Short 16mm On Video	3:00	
Mit Mir	Kerstin Cmelka	Experimental 16mm	3:00	
Nasty As U Wanna Be		Experimental Video		International Premiere
Neighbors	Robert Todd	Experimental Video	4:30	
New York Marathon	Koh Yamamoto	Experimental 16mm	1:00	
Night Tide (for Sailors, Mermaids, Mystics)	Drew Heitzler	Experimental Video	17:09	
Nook and Cranny		Experimental 16mm	3:00	
Number One	Leighton Pierce	Experimental Video	10:05	
Observando el Cielo	Jeanne Liotta	Experimental 16mm	19:00	
Office Suite	Robert Todd	Experimental 16mm	15:30	
Oh Daniel	CC & BN	Short Video	3:00	
Oh Great, Now Look What Happened	Gerbrand Burger, Tijmen Hauer	Experimental 35mm	4:04	
On The Marriage Broker Joke as Cited by Sigmund Freud in Wit and Its Relation to the Unconscious, or Can The Avant-Garde Artist be Wholed?	Owen Land	Experimental 16mm	17:00	
Orchard Gallery Presents		Experimental 16mm	76:00	
P.R.	Bryan Leister	Animation Video	1:10	
Paradise (excerpts from a work-in-progress)	Michael Almereyda	Experimental Video	13:00	
Photography is Easy	Leslie Thornton	Experimental Video	4:28	
Playing Dead	Kevin Jerome Everson	Short 16mm	1:30	
Priciest Homes	Jesper Nordahl	Experimental Video	3:00	
Prison Images	Harun Farocki	Experimental Video	60:00	US Premiere
private_eyez.mid	Frankie Martin, Cory Arcangel	Experimental Video	3:00	
Raw Nerves: A Lacanian Thriller	Manual De Landa	Experimental 16mm On Video	30:00	
Rejected or Unused Clips	Seth Price	Experimental Video	10:00	
Return of the Black Tower		Experimental Video	15:00	
Roberta Beck Mercurial Cinema presents REVOLUTION 9		Experimental 16mm		
Rock My Religion		Experimental Video	55:00	
Rocket	Luther Price	Experimental 16mm	7:00	
Ruhe im Stalle furtzt die Kuh (Be Quiet, there is a Cow farting in the Stable)	Mark Ther	Short Video	7:47	
Serendipity 1967	Aaron Valdez	Experimental Super-8 On Video	6:00	
Seven Days Til Sunday	Reynold Reynolds, Patrick Jolley	Experimental Super-8 On Video	10:00	
Slave #13	Koh Yamamoto	Experimental 16mm	3:00	
Smells Like Teen Spirit	Jem Cohen	Short Super-8 On Video	7:37	
Social Visions	Redmond Entwistle	Documentary 16mm	20:00	
Songs of Azores	Adrienne Jorge	Documentary Super-8 On Video	9:00	
Stranger Comes to Town	Jacqueline Goss	Animation Video	28:00	
Super High Me		Documentary Video	89:00	New York Premiere
The Black Tower	John Smith	Experimental Video	24:00	
The Disappearance	John Menick	Experimental Video	8:00	
The End of the Light Age	James June Schneider	Feature 16mm		New York Premiere
The Fall of Communism as Seen in Gay Pornography	William E. Jones	Experimental Video	20:00	
The Film - An Epic Adventure, or The Other Kwai	Jesper Nordahl	Documentary Video	11:00	
The Golden Age of Fish	Kevin Jerome Everson	Feature Video	60:00	New York Premiere
The Juche Idea	Jim Finn	Feature Video	62:00	New York Premiere
The Lincoln Library of Essential Information Volume 20	Kelly Oliver, Keary Rosen	Experimental Video	2:28	
The Magician's House	Deborah Stratman	Experimental 16mm	5:45	
The Manipulators	Andrew Jeffrey Wright, Claire E. Rojas	Animation 16mm On Video	2:00	
The Only Possible City, part 1		Experimental 16mm	73:00	
The Only Possible City, part 2		Experimental Video	60:00	
The Only Possible City, part 3		Experimental Video	93:00	
The Operation	Jacob Pander, Marne Lucas	Experimental 16mm On Video	10:00	
The People's Advocate: The Life & Times of Charles R. Garry	Hrag Yedalian	Documentary Video	59:00	New York Premiere
The Third Body	Peggy Ahwesh	Experimental Video	9:00	
The Vyrotonin Decision	Matt Mccormick	Experimental 16mm	7:00	
Throwing Paint Tins off the Roof	Vibeke Bryld	Documentary 16mm	20:15	
Tiger Me Bollix	Andrew Lampert, Moira Tierney	Experimental Super-8 On Video	3:30	
Toute la Memoire du Monde		Experimental 16mm	21:00	
Tube Time!		Short Video		
Two Black Towers		Short Video		
Two Black Towers		Animation 16mm		International Premiere
Unfolding Continuum	Nate Boyce	Experimental Video	9:00	
Untied	Deborah Stratman	Experimental 16mm	3:00	
Untitled #1 (from the series Earth People 2507)	Nao Bustamante	Experimental Video	5:00	
Untitled (Pink Dot)	Takeshi Murata	Experimental Video	5:00	
Victory Over the Sun	Michael Robinson	Experimental 16mm	13:00	
We are Wizards	Josh Koury	Documentary Video	79:00	New York Premiere
We will live to see these things, or, five pictures of what may come to pass	Julia Meltzer, David Thorne	Documentary Video	47:00	
What I'm Looking For	Shelly Silver	Experimental Video	15:00	
What's On?	Martha Colburn	Animation 16mm	2:00	
When The Light's Red	Keith Wilson	Documentary Video	10:45	
Whispering Pines #5	Shana Moulton	Experimental Video	6:32	
Window of Time	James Fotopoulos	Experimental Video	22:32	
Window of Time #2	James Fotopoulos	Experimental Video	15:28	
X: The Baby Cinema	Robert Banks	Documentary 16mm	16:00	
Ya Private Sky	Stom Sogo	Experimental Video	3:00	
