= Matilda and the Ramsay Bunch series 3 =

Matilda and the Ramsay Bunch
- Season 3
- Starring: Main Cast; Matilda Ramsay; Gordon Ramsay; Holly Ramsay; Megan Ramsay; Tana Ramsay; Jack Ramsay; Emma; Byrom Mee; Guest Starring; Alondra Santos; Bryce Dallas Howard; Aaron Jackson; Marcus Henderson
- No. of episodes: 15

Release
- Original network: CBBC HD; CBBC
- Original release: 5 May – 11 August 2017

Season chronology
- ← Previous series 2 Next → series 4

The third series of the children's British cooking programme Matilda and the Ramsay Bunch which began airing from 5 May 2017 on CBBC, the series consists of 15 episodes. The series concluded on 11 August 2017. It was announced in July 2016 that CBBC had renewed the series for a third series which will air in 2017. The third series will follow the same format as the past two series where we will see the Ramsay family on their summer holidays in L.A, all of the Ramsay family will return for the third series.

It was announced in June 2017, that a fourth series has been ordered to air in summer 2018.

== Production ==
=== Development ===
After the second series of Matilda and the Ramsay Bunch had finished airing, it was later announced due to the popularity of the first two series that there would be a third series to air in 2017. It was officially announced on 19 July 2016 that CBBC had ordered a third series of Matilda and the Ramsay Bunch, the third series is due to start in early 2017 on the CBBC channel. The series will be made up of 15x15 minute episodes.

The third series will carry on airing on Fridays same as series two, however, the series has been moved to an earlier time slot and will air at 7:45 am making it earlier than past series which have all aired between 4 pm and 5:30 pm.

=== Filming ===
Filming for the third series was the same as past series, it took place during the U.K summer holidays when the Ramsay family go to L.A for their holidays. All the Ramsay family will return for the third series. The third series finished filming in L.A on 23 August 2016, with more filming taking place in the U.K.

=== Promotion ===
The third series of Matilda and the Ramsay Bunch is due to begin airing on 5 May 2017 on CBBC, the first preview clip was posted on 29 April 2017 on the CBBC website. The clip was from the first episode, the official trailer for the third series was also released on 29 April and was shown on CBBC and on the CBBC official YouTube channel.

Matilda Ramsay went on to ITV This Morning to promote the new series and to also promote her new cooking book based on the third series.

== Guest starring ==
The third series also had guest appearances from celebrities same as the second series.

Celebrities	Episode number	Notes
Alondra Santos	Episode 8	N/A
It's the anniversary of Matilda's parents Gordon and Tana, Tilly, Jack, Holly and Megan decided they wanted to write their own song for their parents. They organise America Got talent contestant Alondra Santo to help them write a song from scratch for Gordon and Tana, Santos sang the song at the Ramsay house with help from Tilly, Megan, Jack and Holly who also sing the song as well. Alondra also stays for the meal with the Ramsay family.
The cast of Pete's Dragon: Bryce Dallas Howard, Aaron Jackson & Marcus Henderson	Episode 13	N/A
Tilly is at the red carpet of one of the biggest films of 2016, Pete's Dragon where she meet three of the films' stars, she interviewed them by asking them what is their favourite foods and many more questions. Tilly interviewed Bryce Dallas Howard who plays Grace Meacham, a forest ranger, Aaron Jackson who plays Abner, a lumberjack and Marcus Henderson who plays Woodrow, a lumberjack.

== Episodes ==
No. overall	No. in series	Title	Guest(s)	Original release date	UK viewers (Thousands)
London
31	1	The Ramsays Are Go	N/A	5 May 2017	233,000
Los Angeles
32	2	The B Ball Match	N/A	12 May 2017	Outside top 10
33	3	The Big Zen	N/A	19 May 2017	270,000
34	4	Return of the Jack	N/A	26 May 2017	120,000
35	5	The Toughest Challenge Ever	N/A	2 June 2017	146,000
36	6	LA Dogs	N/A	9 June 2017	Outside top 10
37	7	Grand Prix	N/A	16 June 2017	162,000
38	8	The Wedding Anniversary	Alondra Santos	23 June 2017	277,000
39	9	The Lip Sync Challenge	N/A	30 June 2017	Outside top 10
40	10	The Fishing Trip	N/A	7 July 2017	168,000
41	11	The Ramsay Games	N/A	14 July 2017	Outside top 10
42	12	The BBQ Beef	N/A	21 July 2017	Outside top 10
43	13	The Ramsay Vloggers	Bryce Dallas Howard; Aaron Jackson; Marcus Henderson	28 July 2017	Outside top 10
London
44	14	The Old Man's Birthday	N/A	4 August 2017	Outside top 10
45	15	The Ramsays Connected	N/A	11 August 2017	Outside top 10

== Ratings ==
Episode	Date	CBBC ratings (In Thousands)	CBBC weekly ratings	Total viewers (In Thousands)
Episode 1	5 May 2017	203,000	3	233,000
Episode 2	12 May 2017	Outside top 10	n/a	n/a
Episode 3	19 May 2017	270,000	3	270,000
Episode 4	26 May 2017	120,000	7	120,000
Episode 5	2 June 2017	146,000	7	146,000
Episode 6	9 June 2017	Outside top 10	n/a	n/a
Episode 7	16 June 2017	162,000	2	162,000
Episode 8	23 June 2017	277,000	2	277,000
Episode 9	30 June 2017	Outside top 10	n/a	n/a
Episode 10	7 July 2017	168,000	4	168,000
Episode 11	14 July 2017	Outside top 10	n/a	n/a
Episode 12	21 July 2017	Outside top 10	n/a	n/a
Episode 13	28 July 2017	Outside top 10	n/a	n/a
Episode 14	4 August 2017	Outside top 10	n/a	n/a
Episode 15	11 August 2017	Outside top 10	n/a	n/a
Series average		192,285	4	196,571
