= Matilda and the Ramsay Bunch series 2 =

Matilda and the Ramsay Bunch
- Season 2
- Starring: Main cast Matilda Ramsay; Gordon Ramsay; Holly Ramsay; Megan Ramsay; Tana Ramsay; Jack Ramsay; Emma; Guest Starring; Cruz Beckham; James Corden; The Vamps
- No. of episodes: 15

Release
- Original network: CBBC HD; CBBC
- Original release: BBC iPlayer air date 29 April; Television air date 6 May 2016 – 12 August 2016

Season chronology
- ← Previous series 1 Next → series 3

The second series of the children's British cooking programme Matilda and the Ramsay Bunch aired from 6 May to 12 August 2016, it was announced that the series was renewed by CBBC for a second series. The Second series follows the Ramsay family on their summer holidays in L.A, Cornwall and London where Matilda Ramsay (Tilly) cooks her favourite meals and foods whiles the rest of the family go out and about Tilly also challenges her family to do challenges in each show.

The second series of Matilda and the Ramsay Bunch was moved from its Tuesday evening time slot to a Friday and would air all 15 episodes at the same time unlike the first series witch had many different time slots. Episode 1 of Matilda and the Ramsay Bunch was released on BBC Iplayer on 29 April 2016 a week before original broadcast. Episode 1 was then also shown on CBBC on 6 May 2016.

== Production ==
=== Development ===
It was announced in August 2015 that Matilda and the Ramsay Bunch would be renewed for a 15x15 minute second series to air in 2016, unlike the first series where the show was filmed in L.A the second series was filmed in L.A, Cornwall and London at all three Ramsay family homes throughout the summer holidays. The second series saw many guest stars including James Cordon, Cruz Beckham and The Vamps.

=== Filming ===
When the second series was confirmed, it was also reviled that filming for the series again took place during the U.K summer holidays in 2015 for April 2016 release. Unlike the first series where it was all filmed in L.A for the third series the Ramsay family took holidays in L.A, Cornwall and London. It was all filmed over 6 weeks same as the first series.

== Guest starring ==
The second series saw many guest stars throughout the series, some of the celebrities where interviewed by the Ramsay's and some performed. This was the first series to introduce guest starring and it will return in series three.

Celebrities	Episode number	Notes
James Corden	Episode 4	N/A
Corden appears in the fourth episode; Tilly and her father are off to The Late Late Show with James Corden as Gordon is appearing on the show with Tilly for a cooking item/ challenge, before the lice show Tilly gives James some food that she cook for him in a hamper. During the live show the three have a challenge to who can cook the best British breakfast James vs Tilly & Gordon. It all goes down hill when Gordon makes a mess of the bacon and almost sets it on fire and James doing all the cooking in one pan also making a mess. The winners where Tilly & Gordon
Cruz Beckham	Episode 2	N/A
Beckham appears in the second episode; The Ramsay family are making their own drive-in movie, Tilly leaves the making to her brothers and sisters whiles she cooks the food for the movie and she was also playing jokes and pranks on her family recording them for the home movie. Whiles Tilly was cooking outside in the garden the home movie screen wasn't going to well so Mum Tana decide to bring in some help for them, she brings in Cruz Beckham to help make the screen. Cruz didn't stay for the evening film though
The Vamps (British band)	Episode 9	Also performed at the end of the show
The Vamps appears in the ninth episode; The Ramsay family find out what it takes to become big rock stars. Matilda makes a meal for The Vamps, once the food is cooked and ready along with her brother, sisters and their friends and Gordon and Tana they go and visit The Vamps on tour in L.A. Tilly gives her food to the band in witch they loved it. The band show the Ramsay family where they perform and they lets Matilda have a go playing on the drum kit. Matilda's brother Jack a guitar and he gets to play on stage with them.

== Episodes ==
No. overall	No. in series	Title	Guest(s)	Original release date	UK viewers (Thousands)
Los Angeles
16	1	"The Competition"	N/A	BBC iPlayer air date: 29 April 2016; Television air date: 6 May 2016	Outside top 10
Matilda and the Ramsay bunch - dad Gordon, mum Tana, big brother Jack and sisters Megan and Holly - touch down in Los Angeles and get very competitive from the word go. The family head straight to the beach and race each other to be first in the sea. At the beach they meet an incredible surfing dog, a golden retriever called Ricochet, and Matilda and Jack get the chance to surf with her. Back on dry land the next family competition is to see who can take the best selfie. Whilst Jack, Megan and Holly head to the funfair on Santa Monica Pier, Matilda gets cooking. To celebrate arriving in Los Angeles, Matilda cooks an all-American dinner - healthy fried chicken and Hollywood Hills crunch. Then when her brother and sisters get home they all make an enormous banana split that's so big they serve it in a real drainpipe! Note: The Competition episode was released a week early on the BBC iPlayer on 29 April 2016
17	2	"The Drive-In"	Cruz Beckham	13 May 2016	200,000
Matilda and the Ramsay Bunch get a surprise visit from the Cookie Monster. If there's a guy who knows how to make cookies, it's this guy, so he and Matilda get straight down to work making a giant chocolate chip cookie. When it gets dark, the Ramsay Bunch are having a drive-in movie night in the back garden, so they all get to work. Along with their friend Cruz Beckham, Matilda's brother and sisters Jack, Holly and Megan build the outdoor screen to watch the film on, whilst Matilda cooks margherita and pepperoni pizza and a rainbow salad. As well as cooking, Matilda makes a prank film and the whole family fall for her tricks, even dad Gordon - gotcha! Note: Guest Appearance from Cruz Beckham.
18	3	"The Wild West"	N/A	20 May 2016	203,000
Matilda and the Ramsay bunch set off on a road trip to the American Wild West. The first stop is a cowboy ranch in the Nevada desert. At the ranch Matilda and her brother Jack, mum Tana and dad Gordon saddle up on horseback, learn how to ride horses like cowboys and get the chance to round up cattle - Wild West-style. While the rest of the Ramsay bunch learn how to use a lasso, Matilda cooks lunch on a campfire. She makes vegetable ratatouille parcels and shovel steaks - marinated steaks cooked on the campfire flames using real shovels.
19	4	"The TV Show"	James Corden	27 May 2016	Outside top 10
Matilda and the Ramsay Bunch follows Matilda and her dad Gordon as they appear on James Corden's American TV programme, The Late Late Show with James Corden. James is a British megastar, actor and comedian who loves great food, so Matilda cooks him some classic British steak and kidney pies and delicious fruity chutney. At the television, studio Matilda learns all about what it takes to make a big TV programme. Then in front of all the cameras and a large studio audience, Matilda and dad Gordon take James on in a competition to see who can cook the best full English breakfast, but part way through the competition with everything going well, suddenly - disaster strikes! Note: Guest appearance from James Corden
20	5	"The Sea Lion Rescue"	N/A	3 June 2016	Outside top 10
Matilda Ramsay and her family are in LA to make food and have fun. Matilda and the Ramsay bunch travel to the California Wildlife Center to learn about rescuing very ill sea lions and how to make them better. Matilda makes a fish smoothie full of herring and vitamins for them. It looks and smells totally disgusting, but the sick sea lions love it! After feeding time, the Ramsay bunch decide to hold a cake bake on Malibu Pier to raise money to help save the sea lions. Matilda's siblings and their friends take care of publicity and decorating the stall, while Matilda bakes delicious treats to sell to the public: SOS biscuits, sea lion cakes, and her healthy twist on doughnuts which she calls 'rescue rings'.
21	6	"The Big Trip"	N/A	5 June 2015	Outside top 10
Matilda and the Ramsay Bunch travel to Las Vegas in Nevada where they get to train with Cirque du Soleil acrobats. With mum and dad watching Matilda, Megan and Jack get put through their paces on the high-rise trapeze and learn how to do a spectacular circus stunt. After circus training, Matilda goes to work with dad and gets to cook in a professional kitchen for the first time. She learns to cook mac 'n' cheese, a classic American dish, and attempts to get her own dish - three delicious mini burgers (fish, meat and vegetarian) - on the restaurant's menu.
22	7	"The Day Off"	N/A	17 June 2016	Outside top 10
When the Ramsay family hit the Californian coast for a beach barbecue Matilda takes the day off and gives the job of cooking lunch to her sisters, Megan and Holly. As the girls get cooking, brother Jack is given a lesson on how to fly and film incredible shots with a drone. Matilda's dad Gordon loves fishing and so does Jack, so together they go fishing on a jet ski hoping for a big catch. For lunch, Megan and Holly make a sweet zingy salad and barbecued fish cakes, and for dessert they cook barbecued summer peaches with honey and nuts. The girls do a great job and Matilda gives their cooking the big thumbs up.
23	8	"The Number One Sport"	N/A	19 June 2016	165,000
More action and great food from Matilda and the Ramsay bunch as the gang get into American football - the number one sport in the US. Matilda's brother Jack and sisters Megan and Holly go training with a professional team called the Inglewood Blackhawks and learn some great touchdown moves. Next stop for the Ramsay bunch is cheerleader training with the incredibly athletic LA Dream All Stars where they learn how Americans support their teams. Meanwhile, Matilda is doing what she loves best - cooking. She makes a dinner to celebrate American football, kicking off with sloppy joes and touchdown dip and chips, followed by cherry pie - you can't get more American than that!
24	9	"The Concert"	The Vamps	1 July 2016	184,000
Matilda and the Ramsay Bunch find out what it takes to become a rock star. Matilda is cooking a slap-up pre-concert meal for the Vamps, then together with her brother, sister and their friends they're going to watch the band play live. Matilda cooks pulled chicken lettuce wraps, rocking Ramsay rice balls and microphone cake pops. The Vamps think her food is so good they offer her a job as their personal chef on the tour. In return for Matilda's delicious cooking, the band show the Ramsay Bunch the concert stage, and Tristan, the drummer, lets Matilda have a go playing his drum kit. She's not the only one who gets a taste of rock stardom though - Brad and James, the Vamps' guitarists, lend Matilda's brother Jack a guitar and he gets to play on stage with them. Note: Guest appearance from The Vamps, who were interviewed by the Ramsay family, and performed one of their songs at the end of the show.
Cornwall
25	10	"The Ramsay Pirates"	N/A	8 July 2016	Outside top 10
More action, adventure and delicious food as Matilda and the Ramsay bunch travel to the Cornish seaside and set sail on a homemade raft. Matilda's brother Jack and sisters Megan and Holly get busy building a raft out of barrels, wood and rope. For lunch, Matilda cooks a Cornish feast - seaside spaghetti made with local sausages, Cornish pilchards on toast and some yummy biscuits called Cornish fairings. After lunch, Matilda and her crew of Ramsay pirates head to the beach to climb aboard and launch their homemade raft - but will it sail?
26	11	"The Beach Race"	N/A	15 July 2016	Outside top 10
It's another full-on day for Matilda and the Ramsay bunch. They travel to Watergate Bay beach on the Cornish coast for some fantastic food and amazing fun. Matilda and the gang learn how to drive sail-powered blowcarts, then gear up for a high-speed beach race that's full of thrills and spills. Back at home, Matilda cooks a meal to celebrate the brilliant British seaside - any fish pie, homemade ketchup and magic 99 ice creams. And to cap off a fantastic day, dad Gordon says it's the best cooking she's ever done!
27	12	"The Birthday"	N/A	22 July 2016	302,000
This time in Cornwall, Matilda and the Ramsay bunch are on a mission - it's mum Tana's birthday, so the gang are planning to make it really special. First thing, when mum and dad are still asleep, Matilda, Megan, Jack and Holly get straight down to work cooking mum a surprise breakfast in bed - smiley-faced pancakes with blueberries, bacon and maple syrup. After breakfast they set about designing and making a unique birthday present with a seaside twist and cooking a special celebratory lunch. Matilda makes mum's favourite noodle dish and together with Jack and a bit of help from dad Gordon she bakes mum a delicious birthday cake - with a secret compartment!
28	13	"The Massive Jump"	N/A	29 July 2016	189,000
More exciting adventures with Matilda and the Ramsay Bunch, as they go coasteering on the rocky Cornish coastline. This time it's a girls-only expedition and Matilda's making a delicious energy packed picnic to take with them - a super-healthy fruit smoothie to give them an energy boost, yummy black hummus, and Cornish pasties with a twist. Picnic packed and ready to go the girls travel to the rugged coast around Tintagel castle, which is reputed to be the birthplace of King Arthur. Coasteering lives up to its daredevil reputation but the girls brave the craggy Cornish cliffs and freezing cold sea to have a brilliant and extreme adventure.
London
29	14	"The Last Day of Summer"	N/A	5 August 2016	Outside top 10
Matilda and the Ramsay Bunch are back home in London and they're throwing a party for some of their friends. With a party to organise the gang get to work. Matilda's brother Jack and sisters Megan and Holly take shopping to another level, as they speed along the river Thames on a high-performance rib to pick up supplies. Matilda's in charge of the party food: build-your-own spicy sausage pitta bread sandwiches with zingy yoghurt sauce and popcorn cakes. The popcorn cakes idea came from Scarlet, a Matilda and the Ramsay Bunch viewer who emailed it to Matilda's Food Blog. Great food, friends and fun, and the party finishes with a bang when everyone plays an explosive game with a watermelon – parties don't get much better!
30	15	"The Holiday Final"	N/A	12 August 2016	127,000
Matilda and the Ramsay Bunch are in London for the last episode of the series, and they've got one final adventure in front of them: climbing up, over and down one of the tallest buildings in London - the O2 Arena. As Matilda and her family set off on their exciting climb over the Dome, they look back over the fantastic summer they've just had, remembering everything they've done, the people they've met, the places they've been and the delicious food Matilda has cooked.

== Ratings ==
Episode	Date	CBBC ratings (In Thousands)	CBBC weekly ratings	Total viewers (In Thousands)
Episode 1	6 May 2016	Outside top 10	N/A	N/A
Episode 2	13 May 2016	200,000	2	241,000
Episode 3	20 May 2016	203,000	2	210,000
Episode 4	27 May 2016	Outside top 10	N/A	N/A
Episode 5	3 June 2016	Outside top 10	N/A	N/A
Episode 6	5 June 2016	Outside top 10	N/A	N/A
Episode 7	17 June 2016	Outside top 10	N/A	N/A
Episode 8	19 June 2016	165,000	10	169,000
Episode 9	1 July 2016	184,000	7	233,000
Episode 10	8 July 2016	Outside top 10	N/A	N/A
Episode 11	15 July 2016	Outside top 10	N/A	N/A
Episode 12	22 July 2016	302,000	1	302,000
Episode 13	29 July 2016	189,000	2	201,000
Episode 14	5 August 2016	Outside top 10	N/A	N/A
Episode 15	12 August 2016	127,000	9	127,000
Series average		195,714		211,857

== BBC Store ==
After the second series had finished all 15 episodes were available to buy online on the BBC Store. From 1 November 2017 all episodes bought would be lost due to BBC Store being closed down.
