= Matilda and the Ramsay Bunch series 4 =

Matilda and the Ramsay Bunch
- Season 4
- Starring: Main Cast; Matilda Ramsay; Gordon Ramsay; Holly Ramsay; Megan Ramsay; Tana Ramsay; Jack Ramsay; Guest Starring; Joe Clarke; Mo Farah; Tom Daley; Joe Clarke
- No. of episodes: 15

Release
- Original network: CBBC HD; CBBC
- Original release: 24 April – 31 July 2018

Season chronology
- ← Previous series 3

The fourth series of the children's British cooking programme Matilda and the Ramsay Bunch which began airing from 24 April 2018 on CBBC and finished on 31 July 2018. It was announced in June 2017 that CBBC had renewed the show for a fourth series which will air in 2018. The fourth series will follow the same format as the past three series where we will see the Ramsay family on their summer holidays, all of the Ramsay family will return. The series returned to airing later in the day unlike the third series which aired in the mornings.

== Production ==
=== Development ===
During broadcast of the third series, it was announced that the show was renewed for a fourth series which is due to air in summer 2018 on CBBC. The Ramsay family were seen filming in London at the 2017 Dragon boat festival. All the Ramsay's are expected to return for the fourth series. The series will go back to its usual time slot of 5:25pm and will run for 15x15 minute episodes. The fourth series will see the show return to Cornwall which wasn't featured in the third series due to the Ramsay Cornwall home being rebuilt.

Another change to the fourth series saw Ramsay family friends Emma and Byrom who had appeared as recurring cast members from the second series didn't return for the fourth series.

=== Filming ===
Filming for the fourth series began in June 2017 in London at the London dragon boat festival 2017. All the Ramsay family will return for the fourth series. Filming also took place at the 2017 London Marathon were Megan Ramsay ran the Marathon. Filming also took place in Cornwall, the Ramsay family were seen filming with the RNLI.

For the first time the series went to Italy to film at the La Festa Italiana festival in 2017 also for the first time the series wasn't filmed in America where it's been filmed for the last three series.

== Guest starring ==
The four series also had guest appearances from celebrities same as the past series.

Celebrities	Episode number	Notes
Joe Clarke	Episode 3	N/A
Mo Farah, Tom Daley and Joe Clarke	Episode 4	Appearance via video message

== Episodes ==
No. overall	No. in series	Title	Guest(s)	Original release date	UK viewers (Thousands)
London
46	1	The Sunday Lunch	N/A	24 April 2018	177,000
47	2	The Survivalists	N/A	1 May 2018	147,000
48	3	The White Water Rush	Joe Clarke	8 May 2018	209,000
49	4	The Marathon Girl	Mo Farah, Tom Daley, Joe Clarke	15 May 2018	outside top 10
50	5	The Big Bike Bite	N/A	22 May 2018	N/A
51	6	The Snake Boy	N/A	29 May 2018	N/A
Italy
52	7	La Festa Italians: Part One	N/A	5 June 2018	N/A
53	8	La Festa Italians: Part Two	N/A	12 June 2018	N/A
London
54	9	The Make-over	N/A	19 June 2018	N/A
55	10	The Dragon Racers	N/A	26 June 2018	N/A
56	11	The Hospital Challenge	N/A	3 July 2018	N/A
57	12	The Ballerinos	N/A	10 July 2018	N/A
Cornwall
58	13	The Perfect Day	N/A	17 July 2018	N/A
59	14	The Lifeboat Rescue	N/A	24 July 2018	N/A
60	15	The Ramsays Return	N/A	31 July 2018	N/A

== Ratings ==
Episode	Date	CBBC ratings (In Thousands)	CBBC weekly ratings	Total viewers (In Thousands)
Episode 1	24 April 2018	177,000	3	177,000
Episode 2	1 May 2018	147,000	9	147,000
Episode 3	8 May 2018	209,000	3	209,000
Episode 4	15 May 2018	Outside top 10	N/A	Outside top 10
Episode 5	22 May 2018	TBA	TBA	TBA
Episode 6	29 May 2018	TBA	TBA	TBA
Episode 7	5 June 2018	TBA	TBA	TBA
Episode 8	12 June 2018	TBA	TBA	TBA
Episode 9	19 June 2018	TBA	TBA	TBA
Episode 10	26 June 2018	TBA	TBA	TBA
Episode 11	3 July 2018	TBA	TBA	TBA
Episode 12	10 July 2018	TBA	TBA	TBA
Episode 13	17 July 2018	TBA	TBA	TBA
Episode 14	24 July 2018	TBA	TBA	TBA
Episode 15	31 July 2018	TBA	TBA	1TBA
Series average		TBA	TBA	TBA
