= Matilda and the Ramsay Bunch series 1 =

Matilda and the Ramsay Bunch
- Season 1
- Starring: Matilda Ramsay; Gordon Ramsay; Holly Ramsay; Megan Ramsay; Tana Ramsay; Jack Ramsay
- No. of episodes: 15

Release
- Original network: CBBC HD; CBBC
- Original release: 14 April – 21 July 2015

Season chronology
- Next → series 2

The first series of the children's British cooking programme Matilda and the Ramsay Bunch aired from 12 April to 21 July 2015, The series was created by CBBC the series follows the Ramsay family on their summer holidays in L.A where Matilda (Tilly) Ramsay cooks her favourite meals and foods while the rest of the family go out trying new things such as surfing, making their own drive in and Tilly also challenges her family to do challenges in each show.

== Production ==
=== Development ===
It was announced in January 2015 that CBBC had created a new children's cooking show. The show stars the Ramsay family on their summer holidays in L.A. The first series was made up of 15x15 minute episodes which started airing in April 2015 and ran for 15 weeks finishing on 21 July 2015.

=== Filming ===
Filming for the first series of Matilda and the Ramsay Bunch took place in America in L.A where the Ramsay family own a house, most of the filming took place on location and in the kitchen. Filming took place a year before broadcast in summer 2014 and began airing in 2015, the series is filmed during the U.K summer holidays.

== Episodes ==
No. overall	No. in series	Title	Guest(s)	Original release date	UK viewers (Thousands)
Los Angeles
1	1	"The LA Arrival"	N/A	14 April 2015	229,000
2	2	"The Movies"	N/A	21 April 2015	161,000
3	3	"The Monster Party"	N/A	28 April 2015	Outside top 10
4	4	"The Beach BBQ"	N/A	5 May 2015	184,000
5	5	"The Big Food Fight"	N/A	12 May 2015	337,000
6	6	"The Bollywood Party"	N/A	19 May 2015	198,000
7	7	"The US Sportsday"	N/A	26 May 2015	Outside top 10
8	8	"The Sleepover"	N/A	2 June 2015	260,000
9	9	"The pool Party"	N/A	9 June 2015	Outside top 10
10	10	"The Karaoke Party"	N/A	16 June 2015	165,000
11	11	"The LA Makeover"	N/A	23 June 2015	243,000
12	12	"Fitness Training"	N/A	30 June 2015	Outside top 10
13	13	"The Mexican Party"	N/A	7 July 2015	Outside top 10
14	14	"The Daredevils"	N/A	14 July 2015	159,000
15	15	"The Big Goodbye"	N/A	21 July 2015	Outside top 10

== Ratings ==
Episode	Date	CBBC ratings (In Thousands)	CBBC weekly ratings	Total viewers (In Thousands)
Episode 1	14 April 2015	229,000	2	N/A
Episode 2	21 April 2015	161,000	10	179,000
Episode 3	28 April 2015	Outside top 10	N/A	N/A
Episode 4	5 May 2015	184,000	5	184,000
Episode 5	12 May 2015	337,000	1	339,000
Episode 6	19 May 2015	198,000	5	200,000
Episode 7	26 May 2015	Outside top 10	N/A	N/A
Episode 8	2 June 2015	260,000	4	260,000
Episode 9	9 June 2015	Outside top 10	N/A	N/A
Episode 10	16 June 2015	165,000	8	165,000
Episode 11	23 June 2015	243,000	2	243,000
Episode 12	30 June 2015	Outside top 10	N/A	N/A
Episode 13	7 July 2015	Outside top 10	N/A	N/A
Episode 14	14 July 2015	159,000	7	162,000
Episode 15	21 July 2015	Outside top 10	N/A	N/A
Series average		215,111		216,500
