= Witch School =

Witch School is a Wiccan school offering both online courses as well as on their two campus in Chicago, Illinois and Salem, Massachusetts. It was founded by Rev. Ed Hubbard.

== Website ==
In 2001, the website witchschool.com was opened to the public. The site offers numerous different courses in Wicca, Paganism, Divinatory Arts, and more. Over 240,000 students have joined the site since its opening. Original content of the site was provided by Donald Lewis and the site was programmed by Lisa Tuit.

On April 1, 2009, Witch School added educational portals for the United Kingdom, Europe, and South Africa. Anna Rowe became Dean and Head of School for UK and Europe, and Raene Packery became Dean and Head of School for South Africa. Charlynn Walls currently serves as the Dean of Academic Studies for Witch School Central.

In June 2009, Witch School added a social network based on the Ning Platform and a Headquarters in Second Life.

== Radio and Video ==
On November 11, 2005, Witch School began Magic TV, an online television station that has as generated over 400 videos online. Programming has included interviews with many major Pagan personalities, as well as covering rituals including the Animating Democracy Ritual in Washington DC to celebrate President Obama's Inauguration.

On July 27, 2009, Witch School Live! began as a daily radio show on Blog Talk Radio. Witch School Live! is no longer a current show on Blog Talk Radio, but Witch School does sponsor the show Pagans Tonight, a station on Blog Talk Radio.

== Campuses ==
The first campus was established in 2013.

=== Controversy in Hoopeston ===
In 2003, when the campus was first built, residents of Hoopeston, Illinois and its surrounding areas mobilized with protests and petitions in opposition to the school. In June, 2006, Witch School was still in Hoopestown, and local reactions seemed to have calmed down. The controversy over Witch School was the subject of the 2007 documentary film "Hoopeston." The film premiered at the 2008 New York Underground Film Festival.

=== Sale ===
On 10 April 2007. the financial problems caused by controversy in Hoopestown caused the owners of Witch School to put the school's website up for auction on eBay, along with all the sites connected to them including one called the Minispells website. The sites were advertised as a great business investment, and this caused even more controversy over the school, both from outside and within. The students were also worried about the well-being of the site if it fell into the wrong hands.

The auction of the sale of the website was subsequently removed from eBay. The site was sold to a friendly coalition of students, with the intention that it would remain exactly as it was prior to the selling.

On May 17, 2007, Witch School became Witch School International, Inc., a Delaware Corporation with offices in Illinois. Witch School International, Inc. is a shareholder company that had over 100 shareholders as of November, 2007.

=== Rossville, Illinois ===
Witch School moved its building to Rossville, Illinois in July 2007.

=== Chicago and Salem ===
On October 26, 2009, Witch School announced that it would close its Rossville-Hoopeston area campus.

In 2010 Witch School offered classes in Chicago and opened a second branch in Salem, Massachusetts.

This place no longer exists. The School is online only.
