= Hrag =

Hrag is an Armenian given name. Notable people with the name include:

- Hrag Vartanian (born 1973/1974), American arts writer, art critic, and art curator
- Hrag Yedalian (born 1981), Armenian-American documentary film director and producer
