= Ballerina (disambiguation) =

A ballerina is a principal female dancer in a ballet company.

Ballerina may also refer to:

== Films ==
- Ballerina (1937 film), featuring Jeanine Charrat, Mia Čorak Slavenska and Yvette Chauviré
- Ballerina (1950 film), French film directed by Ludwig Berger
- Ballerina (1956 film), German film by Georg Wilhelm Pabst
- Ballerina (1966 film), American/German film
- Ballerina (2006 film), documentary following Russian ballerinas
- Ballerina (2016 film), French/Canadian animated film
- Ballerina (2023 film), a South Korean thriller film directed by Lee Chung-hyun and starring Jeon Jong-seo and Kim Ji-hoon
- The Ballerina, 2017 American film
- Ballerina (2025 film), a spinoff film in the John Wick franchise

== Music ==
- "Ballerina" (Malou Prytz song), a 2020 song by Malou Prytz
- "Ballerina" (Sidney Keith Russell and Carl Sigman song), a 1947 song covered by many artists
- "Ballerina" (Van Morrison song), a 1968 song on the album Astral Weeks
- "Ballerina (Prima Donna)", a 1983 song by Steve Harley
- "Ballerina", a 2022 song by Enrico Rava from 2 Blues for Cecil

== Other uses ==
- Ballerina (novel), a 1932 book by Eleanor Smith
- Ballerina (programming language), a programming language
- Ballerina Stakes, an American Thoroughbred horse race
- Ballerina, a vine training system
- Herbert Ballerina (born 1980), stage name of Italian actor Luigi Luciano
- The Ballerina (sculpture), a bronze sculpture by Mike Larsen

== See also ==
- Ballerino (disambiguation)
