= Gordon Ramsay's Home Cooking =

British television series

- Genre: Cooking
- Presented by: Gordon Ramsay
- Country of origin: United Kingdom
- Original language: English
- No. of series: 1
- No. of episodes: 20

Original release
- Network: Channel 4
- Release: 14 October – 8 November 2013

Gordon Ramsay's Home Cooking is a British television programme which British chef, Gordon Ramsay, "teaches viewers how to cook simple, tasty, amazing food every day". It aired for a single season of 20 episodes on Channel 4 in October and November 2013. Unlike Gordon Ramsay's Ultimate Cookery Course, the show's name implies his family getting involved, such as his wife Tana and daughter Tilly.

== Episodes ==
No.	Title	Original airdate
1	"The Food I Grew Up On"	14 October 2013
Breakfast: Homemade baked beans with potato cakes; Lunch: Fish fingers with a chip butty; Dinner: Shepherd's pie with cheese champ topping; Dessert: Steamed date pudding with butterscotch sauce		Guide: pollock; lamb mince; potatoes: floury, waxy, all rounder
2	"Food for Friends"	15 October 2013
Breakfast: Griddled polenta with tomatoes and goat's curd; Lunch: Salt crust sea bream with braised leeks; Dinner: Roast chicken with chickpea stuffing; Dessert: Hazelnut meringue tower		Guide: sugars: muscovado, icing sugar, palm sugar, caster sugar; chicken; sea bream
3	"South East Asian"	16 October 2013
Breakfast: Tangy fruit salad; Lunch: Spicy clam noodle soup; Dinner: Sticky spicy chicken wings; Dessert: Banana & coconut fritters (served with lunch)		Guide: lemongrass; tamarind; clams: venus clams, razor clams
4	"Big & Bold"	17 October 2013
Breakfast: Merguez & fontina stuffed croissants; Lunch: Spicy Mexican soup; Dinner: Crispy roast duck with black bean dipping sauce; Dessert: Spiced banana tarte Tatin		Guide: peppercorns; duck; chipotle
5	"Classics with a Twist"	18 October 2013
Breakfast: Boiled eggs with anchovy soldiers; Lunch: Ploughman's lunch with beer bread loaves; Dinner: Stuffed rib of beef with horseradish Yorkshire puddings; Dessert: Eton mess bombe		Guide: Cheddar cheese; rib of beef; horseradish
6	"French"	21 October 2013
Breakfast: Lemon & poppy seed madeleines; Lunch: Tuna Niçoise salad, goat's cheese & pear tartine; Dinner: Chicken fricassee with herby sautéed potatoes; Dessert: Lavender crème caramel		Guide: garlic: pink garlic, elephant garlic, white garlic; brandy: Armagnac, cognac, Calvados; goat's cheese
7	"Healthy"	22 October 2013
Breakfast: Bircher muesli; Lunch: Gazpacho; Dinner: Teriyaki salmon with soba noodle salad; Dessert: Pineapple carpaccio with pomegranate & vanilla salt		Guide: soba noodles; salmon; pomegranate
8	"Street Food"	23 October 2013
Breakfast: Spiced egg & spinach breakfast wrap; Lunch: Prawn tostadas and Salted caramel popcorn; Dinner: Buttermilk fried chicken with quick sweet pickled celery; Dessert: Dulce de leche biscuits		Guide: tortilla; paprika; sweetcorn
9	"Italian"	24 October 2013
Breakfast: Fennel sausage frittata; Lunch: Griddled sardines with gremolata; Dinner: Slow-braised beef cheeks with pappardelle & Crostini with fig jam & burrata; Dessert: Espresso Panna Cotta with hazelnut brittle		Guide: beef cheek; burrata; basil
10	"Party Food"	25 October 2013
Breakfast: Spicy Mexican eggs; Lunch: Cured salmon; Dinner: Smoky pulled pork with chipotle mayonnaise; Dessert: Chocolate mint cake		Guide: chocolate; pork shoulder; salt: rock salt, pink salt, table salt, sea salt
11	"American"	28 October 2013
Breakfast: Eggs baked in hash browns and bacon; Lunch: Big Caesar salad with grilled chicken; Dinner: BBQ beef brisket with crunchy light coleslaw & sweet potato wedges; Dessert: Peanut butter & jam cookies (served with lunch)		Guide: beef brisket; sweet potatoes; peanut butter
12	"Hearty"	29 October 2013
Breakfast: Smoked haddock & spinach baked eggs; Lunch: Roasted tomato soup; Dinner: Beef & ale stew with mustard dumplings, twice baked bubble and squeak jacket potatoes; Dessert: Pear & ginger galette		Guide: stout; suet; ginger
13	"Vegetarian"	30 October 2013
Breakfast: Pear & crunchy granola muffins; Lunch: Halloumi courgette & herb cakes with a tomato & watercress salad; Dinner: Bruschetta with courgette & ricotta, beetroot & thyme risotto; Dessert: Chocolate & lime mousse		Guide: risotto rice: Arborio, Carnaroli, Vialone Nano; beetroot; halloumi
14	"Comfort food"	31 October 2013
Breakfast: Spiced baked porridge; Lunch: Ginger beer battered fish, chilli minted mushy peas; Dinner: Sausage hotpot with potato & beetroot gratin; Dessert: Apple compote with a creamy whip		Guide: sausage; oils: groundnut, rapeseed, sunflower, vegetable; apples: Braeburn, Gala, Russet, Cox, Bramley
15	"Picnic"	1 November 2013
Breakfast: Scotch eggs; Lunch: Carrot cumin & orange salad, pan bagnat; Dinner: Prawn & cucumber salad with spicy yoghurt dressing, anchovy dip; Dessert: Chocolate marshmallow & peanut fridge cake		Guide: prawns; Parma ham; anchovies
16	"Thrifty"	4 November 2013
Breakfast: Cinnamon eggy bread with quick stewed apples; Lunch: Smoky bacon sweetcorn & potato soup and Cheese biscuits; Dinner: Spicy braised oxtail; Dessert: Chilli poached pears with star anise dust		Guide: bacon (pancetta, streaky bacon); star anise; oxtail
17	"Middle Eastern"	5 November 2013
Breakfast: Crispy filo with honeyed yoghurt; Lunch: Lamb koftas, beetroot houmous; Dinner: Pomegranate molasses marinated quail; Dessert: Lemon & pistachio baklava		Guide: filo pastry; quail; chickpeas
18	"More Healthy Recipes"	6 November 2013
Breakfast: Granola; Lunch: Saffron flatbread, steamed mussels with cherry tomatoes & pancetta; Dinner: Aromatic grilled lamb chops, chargrilled broccoli & bulgur wheat salad; Dessert: Healthy mango sundae		Guide: mussels; bulgur wheat; griddled pan
19	"Light"	7 November 2013
Breakfast: Sourdough bread with crushed avocados; Lunch: Mackerel ceviche with fennel salad, quinoa salad; Dinner: Griddled chicken with chickpeas, feta & watermelon salad; Dessert: Lemon & basil granita		Guide: sumac; feta cheese; quinoa
20	"Special Occasions"	8 November 2013
Breakfast: Eggs benedict with crispy parma ham; Lunch: Grilled lobster with bloody mary linguine; Dinner: Beef fillet with salsa verde & truffled new potatoes; Dessert: Chocolate & pistachio semifreddo		Guide: lobster; truffle; beef fillet
