= Deena Dill =

American actress

- Born: Dayton, Tennessee, U.S.
- Education: Vanderbilt University
- Occupations: Actress, producer
- Years active: 1995–present

Deena Dill is an American actress and television executive producer best known for her recurring roles on Nickelodeon's hit show iCarly, ABC's television series Suburgatory, and The CW's sci-fi series Star-Crossed, as well as being a creator and executive producer of The CW's award-winning game show Oh Sit!, which won the Rose d'Or Award for Best International Game Show.

== Early life and education ==
Deena graduated from Vanderbilt University in 1992.

== Career ==
Dill, while in college in Nashville, got her start in television portraying the broken-hearted love interest in over two dozen country music stars' music videos, including Billy Ray Cyrus, Aaron Tippin, George Ducas, and Trace Adkins. After appearing in her first film, Heavyweights (1995), Dill went on to obtain a number of television roles, including appearances in Two and a Half Men, 24, The Weber Show, Becker, ER, and Cracking Up.

In 2005, Deena Dill was cast in the film Coach Carter and then as a recurring character on the television show Boston Legal. Dill transitioned back into television, with roles on Vanished, 3 lbs, Las Vegas, CSI: NY, The Starter Wife, and Drop Dead Diva.

From 2009 to 2010, Dill played the role of Gibby's mom, Charlotte, on Nickelodeon's top rated television show, iCarly. She worked on a number of hit television series such as The Closer, Bones, Army Wives, Awkward, Disney's Good Luck Charlie, and ABC's Scandal.

After a recurring role as Bliss from 2011 to 2013 on ABC's television series Suburgatory, Deena was cast in another recurring role as Margaret Montrose, the mother of Grey Damon, on the new sci fi alien drama Star-Crossed (2014) on The CW.

Dill is one of the creators and executive producers of the CW's game show, Oh Sit!, alongside Phil Gurin and Richard Joel. Oh Sit! won Eurovision's prestigious Rose d'Or Award for Best International Game Show in 2013. The high-stakes, high-octane, extreme musical chairs show was initially picked up for 10 episodes and began airing in the summer of 2012. Oh Sit! moved into its second cycle in early 2013. The hour-long, prime-time competition show is produced by The Gurin Company and 405 Productions, in association with Warner Horizon Television.

In 2017, Dill appeared in The Ballerina, a horror film directed by Steve Pullen.
