= Against the Law (1997 film) =

- Promotional film poster
- Directed by: Jim Wynorski
- Written by: Steve Mitchell; Bob Sheridan
- Produced by: Benjamin R. Reder; Betsy Chasse
- Starring: Richard Grieco; Nancy Allen; Nick Mancuso; Jaime Pressly; Gary Sandy; Thomas Mikal Ford; Heather Thomas
- Cinematography: Andrea V. Rossotto
- Edited by: Richard Gentner
- Music by: Kevin Kiner
- Production company: Sunset Films International
- Release date: November 17, 1997
- Running time: 95 minutes
- Country: United States
- Language: English

Against the Law is a 1997 American action films directed by Jim Wynorski and starring Nick Mancuso, Nancy Allen and Richard Grieco.

== Plot ==
In California, a homeless and mentally ill man, Rex, comes to believe he is a gunfighter from the American Old West, and heads for Los Angeles. While travelling, he begins a murder spree, and his victims include police officers. He becomes fixated on Los Angeles police officer John Shepard, who is in the news after killing a drug dealer in a shootout, and news anchor Maggie Hewitt, who broke the story. He terrorizes Hewitt before arriving in Los Angeles, where he challenges Shepard to a Western-style showdown at high noon.

== Cast ==
- Nancy Allen as Maggie Hewitt
- Richard Grieco as Rex
- Nick Mancuso as Detective John Shepard
- Steven Ford as Lieutenant Bill Carpenter
- Thomas Mikal Ford as Detective Siegel
- Gary Sandy as Chief Leitner
- Leslie Bega as Lucia
- James Stephens as Detective Ben Hamada
- Herb Mitchell as Carl Stensgard
- Heather Thomas as Felicity
- Jaime Pressly as Sally
- B.K. Byron as Lars Reder
- Tim Colceri as Officer I.Q.
- Randy Crowder as Lieutenant Fuller
- Billy Gallo as DJ
- Randy Hall as Security Guard
- Frank Lloyd as Officer Caultman
- Christopher Pettiet as Tommy

== Production ==
The film was written by Steve Mitchell with Bob Sheridan. Mitchell hoped to direct and wrote it with John Terlesky in mind for the lead. Jim Wynorski bought the script for Sunset Films, a company he was operating with Andrew Stevens for Cinetel Films. Mitchell said he thought the film "ultimately turned out to be one of Jim’s best movies, but there are a lot of things I’m not happy with. The casting was a lot of it."
