= Matilda and the Ramsay Bunch =

British television series

- Genre: Cooking; Entertainment; Children
- Created by: CBBC; Optomen
- Written by: Matilda Ramsay
- Directed by: Colin
- Starring: See Below
- Voices of: Matilda Ramsay
- Opening theme: "Matilda and the Ramsay Bunch"
- Ending theme: "Matilda and the Ramsay Bunch"
- Country of origin: United Kingdom
- Original language: English
- No. of series: 5
- No. of episodes: 75 (list of episodes)

Production
- Executive producers: Hugh Lawton; Paul Ratcliffe; Gordon Ramsay; Pat Llewellyn; Sue Murphy
- Production locations: Los Angeles (series 1–3); Cornwall (series 2, series 4–present); London (series 2–present); Italy (series 4)
- Editors: Jonno; Paul
- Camera setup: Multi-camera
- Running time: 15–20 minutes
- Production companies: Objective Media Group; Studio Ramsay

Original release
- Network: CBBC
- Release: 14 April 2015 – 26 July 2019

Matilda and the Ramsay Bunch is a British CBBC cooking entertainment programme which follows Gordon Ramsay and family on their summer holidays. In December 2014 CBBC announced that they had commissioned a new cooking show aimed at children with the first episode airing on 14 April 2015. Series one of the show follows the Ramsay family through their summer holiday in Los Angeles while Gordon's daughter, main star Matilda "Tilly" Ramsay, cooks up a meal to take out or have at home. Five seasons were produced, the last airing in 2019.

== Summary ==
The show follows the daughter of renowned chef Gordon Ramsay as the family heads off on their summer holidays in Los Angeles. Matilda cooks her way through the very best of American and British dishes whilst blogging along the way for the CBBC website, adding her own unique twists to the food. Each episode has its own theme, and Tilly cooks a meal for her family according to the theme whilst the rest of the family - Jack, Megan and Holly - travel around their current city trying out new activities and taking part in challenges against each other. The family also take their summer holidays in the U.K as well, trying out many different British activities from rock climbing to making rafts in the sea.

== Cast ==
This is a list of the main cast, recurring cast and guest starring currently appearing on Matilda and the Ramsay Bunch.

Key
= Main cast (Cast member receives "Starring" credit that series)
= Recurring cast (Cast member appears in two or more episodes that series)

| Cast member | Series | | | | |
| Cast member | Series 1 | Series 2 | Series 3 | Series 4 | Series 5 |
Main cast members
| Matilda Ramsay | Main | Main | Main | Main | Main |
| Gordon Ramsay | Main | Main | Main | Main | Main |
| Tana Ramsay | Main | Main | Main | Main | Main |
| Jack Ramsay | Main | Main | Main | Main | Main |
| Holly Ramsay | Main | Main | Main | Main | Main |
| Megan Ramsay | Main | Main | Main | Main | Main |
Former cast members
| Emma | —N/a | Recurring | Recurring | —N/a | —N/a |
| Byrom Mee | —N/a | —N/a | Recurring | —N/a | —N/a |

=== Guest starring ===
- Cruz Beckham - Series 2
- James Corden - Series 2
- The Vamps - Series 2
- Alondra Santos - Series 3
- Bryce Dallas Howard - Series 3
- Aaron Jackson - Series 3
- Marcus Henderson - Series 3
- Joe Clarke - Series 4
- Mo Farah - Series 4
- Tom Daley - Series 4
- Aaron Sanchez - Series 5

== Development and production ==
In November 2014, the BBC announced a new 15 episode cooking series titled Matilda and the Ramsay Bunch. The series was filmed in America at the Ramsay home in Los Angeles in the summer of 2014, with Gordon Ramsay as Executive Producer alongside Hugh Lawton, Paul Ratcliffe, Pat Llewellyn and Sue Murphy.

It was announced in the summer of 2015 that Matilda and the Ramsay Bunch would be renewed for a 15 episode second series to air in summer of 2016. Filming took place in summer of 2015 in America at the Ramsay home in Los Angeles, Filming also took place in Cornwall and London in the Ramsays' UK homes.

In summer of 2016 it was announced that Matilda and the Ramsay Bunch was renewed for a third series of 15x15 minute episodes to air from 5 May 2017. Same as series two, filming took place in America and around the U.K at the Ramsay homes in Los Angeles and London. Filming for the third series began at the end of July and finished on 23 August 2016.

In June 2017 it was announced that Matilda and the Ramsay Bunch had been ordered for a fourth series of 15x15 minute episodes. The series is aired in April 2018. Filming began in London at the 2017 London Hong Kong Dragon Boat Festival, where Matilda Ramsay was seen filming. All the Ramsay family will return for the fourth season. For the first time in the show's history the Ramsay family didn't film in Los Angeles, making this the first time in 4 years the series hasn't been filmed in America.

=== Renewals ===
In 2015, it was confirmed that CBBC had ordered a second series of 15-minute episodes. Filming took place in Los Angeles, Cornwall and London. The first episode of the second series premiered on the IPlayer on 29 April 2016 and aired on TV on 6 May 2016. The series finished on 12 August 2016.

On 19 July 2015 it was confirmed that a third series had been ordered by CBBC with filming taking place in Los Angeles in August 2016. The third series is due premiere in May 2017 on CBBC. The first trailer for the third series was released on 29 April 2017 on the CBBC channel and on the CBBC YouTube channel. The third series began airing on 5 May 2017 on CBBC. The third series concluded on 11 August 2017.

On 27 June 2017 it was announced that a fourth series of Matilda and the Ramsay Bunch had been ordered by CBBC. Filming began in June 2017 at the 2017 London Dragon boat festival where Matilda Ramsay was seen filming for the series. Tilly confirmed the fourth series on her Instagram live on 17 August 2017. The fourth series began airing on 24 April 2018, with all the Ramsay family returning, including father Gordon.

A fifth series was announced by Victoria Baldesarra – who stars as Michelle in 'The Next Step' – on her Instagram page in July 2018, with filming shown in the Ramsay family's Los Angeles home. It aired in 2019.

== Reception ==
=== Critical reception ===
Despite sporadic criticism, the show has had high viewership with five series aired, and stands as one of CBBC's most watched shows.

=== Series averages ===
Matilda and the Ramsay Bunch was a ratings success upon its initial broadcast. The average viewership for the first series was 216,500 viewers in August 2015. The second series viewership averaged 211,857 viewers, lower than the first series. The first series still holds the highest rated episode with episode 5 The Big Food Fight with a total viewership of 337,000 viewers. Series three saw the lowest viewership in the 3 years of the show, with the series getting an average of just 196,571 viewers or 7.2% less than the second series.

All information in this table comes from BARB.

| Series | Day | # Ep. | Premiere | | Final | | Aired | Average Viewers |
| Series | Day | # Ep. | Date | Premiere Viewers | Date | Finale Viewers | Aired | Average Viewers |
|---|---|---|---|---|---|---|---|---|
| 1 | Tuesdays | 15 | 14 April 2015 | 229,000 | 21 July 2015 | N/A | 2015 | 216,500 |
| 2 | Fridays | 15 | 6 May 2016 | N/A | 12 August 2016 | 127,000 | 2016 | 211,857 |
| 3 | Fridays | 15 | 5 May 2017 | 203,000 | 11 August 2017 | N/A | 2017 | 196,571 |
| 4 | Tuesday | 15 | 24 April 2018 | 177,000 | 31 July 2018 | TBA | 2018 | |

== Titles ==
=== 2015 (S1) ===
The opening sequence for the first series shows Tilly opening the front door, welcoming the viewers into their home, and introducing her family one at a time around the home, interspersed with clips from series one.

=== 2016–2017 (S2–S3) ===
The new revamped opening sequence is much shorter. Tilly doesn't introduce her family; this was instead replaced with the family talking back to Tilly where she makes a joke or a comment about her "crazy family" and also clips from the second series are shown.

The opening sequence from the second series carry on into the third series but with a few changes, instead of Tilly opening the door when the door opens it's Gordon, Holly, Megan and Tana all saying I'm Matilda over and over until Tilly appears from behind and walks into the kitchen, (Jack doesn't make an appearance in the third series titles apart from a 5-second link of him on Tilly's iPad). Clips from the third series are also shown.

=== 2018 (S4) ===
The fourth series titles had a revamp: the first few seconds from the third series titles are shown before cutting to Tilly who is watching it on a TV screen at home before clips from the fourth series are shown. All the Ramsay family feature in the opening titles, with each family member in a different room as Matilda calls them down to start watching Matilda and the Ramsay Bunch on the TV.

== Broadcasts ==
Matilda and the Ramsay Bunch first aired on the CBBC channel on April 14 the first series aired at different times slots on Fridays with repeats on Saturday mornings. When the second series began airing the first episode was released on BBC Iplayer a week before broadcast on TV. The second series was also moved from its Friday slot and move to a Tuesday and aired all 15 episodes at the same time unlike the first series which aired each episode on different times for an unknown reason. Series two repeats where still shown on Saturday mornings same as series one. The third series began airing on 5 May 2017 and the show continued to its Friday slot but will be shown at 7:45 am, earlier than past series. Repeats of old episodes are still shown throughout the year on CBBC. The second series of Matilda and the Ramsay Bunch is available to buy and keep on the BBC store, however the first series isn't available to buy.

It was announced on 25 May 2017 that the BBC Store would be closing down. The second series which was made available to buy and keep would be available until the 1 November 2017 after this date everyone who's bought the second series would lose it.

| Air Date | Episodes | Time Slot | Location Filmed |
Series 1 (2015)
| Tuesdays | 1—3 | 4:55 pm till 5:15 pm | Los Angeles |
| Tuesdays | 4 | 5:25 pm till 5:40 pm | Los Angeles |
| Tuesdays | 5—12 | 4:55 pm till 5:15 pm | Los Angeles |
| Tuesdays | 13—15 | 5:00 pm till 5:15 pm | Los Angeles |
Series 2 (2016)
| Fridays | 1—9 | 5:00 pm till 5:15 pm | Los Angeles |
| Fridays | 10—13 | 5:00 pm till 5:15 pm | Cornwall |
| Fridays | 14—15 | 5:00 pm till 5:15 pm | London |
Series 3 (2017)
| Fridays | 1 | 7:45 am till 8:00 am | London |
| Fridays | 2—13 | 7:45 am till 8:00 am | Los Angeles |
| Fridays | 14—15 | 7:45 am till 8:00 am | London |
Series 4 (2018)
| Tuesdays | 1-6 | 5:25 pm till 5:40 pm | London |
| Tuesdays | 7-8 | 5:25 pm till 5:40 pm | Italy |
| Tuesdays | 9-12 | 5:25 pm till 5:40 pm | London |
| Tuesdays | 13- | 5:25 pm till 5:40 pm | Cornwall |

=== International broadcasters ===
The show has been broadcast around the world including the following countries:

| Country | Broadcaster |
|---|---|
| Singapore | Asian Food Channel |
| Australia | ABC Me |
| Brazil | Globosat |
| Slovenia | Antenna |
| Czech Republic | FTV Prima |
| India | Sky Italia Discovery |
| United Arab Emirates | Takhayal Entertainment |
| USA | Universal Kids |
| Europe | Da Vinci Kids |

Matilda and the Ramsay Bunch airs many overseas countries, the series airs in Singapore on the Asian Food Channel and has aired two series The show aires in Australian on the children channel ABC Me. Two series have aired as of April 2017, with the third due to air later in the year. The series also airs in Globosat in Brazil, Scripps Network in Asia, Antenna in Slovenia, FTV Prima in the Czech Republic and Sky Italia Discovery Networks in India and Takhayal Entertainment in the Middle East all air the series following a deal with distributor All3Media International.

== Series overview ==
| Series | Episodes | Originally released | |
| Series | Episodes | First released | Last released |
|---|---|---|---|
| 1 | 15 | 14 April 2015 | 21 July 2015 |
| 2 | 15 | 6 May 2016 | 12 August 2016 |
| 3 | 15 | 5 May 2017 | 11 August 2017 |
| 4 | 15 | 24 April 2018 | 31 July 2018 |
| 5 | 15 | 19 April 2019 | 19 July 2019 |

== Episodes ==
=== Series 1 (2015) ===
It was announced in January 2015 that CBBC had created a new children's cooking show based around the Ramsay family. The first series was made up of 15 episodes which ran for 15 minutes each. The first episode aired on CBBC on 14 April 2015 and ran for 15 weeks finishing with episode 15 on 21 July 2015. Filming for the series took place in summer 2014 at the Ramsays' home in Las Vegas and took 6 weeks to film.

=== Series 2 (2016) ===
It was announced in August 2015 that Matilda and the Ramsay Bunch would be renewed for a 15x15 minute second series to air in 2016, unlike the first series where the show was filmed in L.A the second series was filmed in L.A, Cornwall and London at all three Ramsay family homes throughout the summer holidays. The second series saw many guest starts from James Cordon, Cruz Beckham and The Vamps. Filming for the series took place in summer 2015 in L.A, Cornwall and London it was again filmed over 6 weeks.

=== Series 3 (2017) ===
On 19 July 2016 it was announced that CBBC had ordered a third series of Matilda and the Ramsay Bunch, the third series started on 5 May 2017 on the CBBC and finished on 11 August 2017. The series will be made up of 15x15 minute episodes. Filming for the third series same as past series took place during the summer holidays when the Ramsay family go to L.A for their holidays. All the Ramsay family will return for the third series. Filming for the third series finished in L.A on 23 August 2016 with more filming talking place in the U.K.

Series 3 also so guest stars appear in the series, in episode 8 America Got Talent contestant Alondra Santos helped write and also sang a song at the Ramsay parents anniversary meal. In episode 13 Tilly got to interview three starts from the 2016 film Pete's Dragon, she interviewed, Bryce Dallas Howard who plays Grace Meacham, a forest range, Aaron Jackson who plays Abner, a lumberjack and Marcus Henderson who plays Woodrow, a lumberjack.

=== Series 4 (2018) ===
On 27 June 2017 it was announced that a fourth series of Matilda and the Ramsay Bunch had been ordered by CBBC to air in Summer 2018. The series will again see the Ramsay family on their summer holiday with Tilly cooking her favourite foods and seeing the family going on adventures and doing challenges against each other. The series will again be made up of 15x15 minute episodes, all the Ramsay family will return for the fourth series. Filming began in London at the 2017 London Dragon boat festival.

The fourth series began on the 24th of April, the fourth series returned to airing in the evening, airing at 5:25 pm. Another change to the fourth series saw Ramsay family friends Emma and Byrom who had appeared as recurring cast members from the second series didn't return for the fourth series.

=== Series 5 (2019) ===
It was confirmed on 10 July that a fifth series was ordered by CBBC. The fifth series will air in 2019 and all the Ramsay family would return.

== Bibliography ==
It was confirmed in March 2017 that Matilda Ramsay would be releasing her first cooking book based on the TV series.

- Matilda & The Ramsay Bunch: Tilly's Kitchen Takeover (2017) ISBN 978-1473652255

== Digi Tilly online mini-series ==
As of 2017 mini episodes were available online of around 3–4 minutes duration and show Tilly cooking one of her favourite foods.

== Awards and nominations ==
| Year | Result | Award | Category |
|---|---|---|---|
| 2015 | Nominated | Children's BAFTA | Children's Entertainment |
| 2015 | Nominated | Children's BAFTA | Kids' Vote Television |
| 2016 | Nominated | Children's BAFTA | Entertainment |
