= Oh Sit! =

American game show

- Genre: Game show
- Created by: Phil Gurin; Richard Joel; Deena Dill
- Presented by: Jamie Kennedy; Jessi Cruickshank; Sideline: Tanika Ray
- Country of origin: United States
- Original language: English
- No. of seasons: 2
- No. of episodes: 20

Production
- Executive producers: Phil Gurin; Richard Joel; Deena Dill
- Running time: 45 minutes
- Production companies: The Gurin Company; 405 Productions; Raquel Productions; Warner Horizon Television

Original release
- Network: The CW
- Release: August 15, 2012 – June 24, 2013

Oh Sit! is an hour-long game show competition series that premiered on September 27, 2012, on The CW. The series, according to the network, was a "high-octane musical chairs competition". Despite low ratings during its run, on September 26, 2012, Oh Sit! was renewed for a ten-episode second season, which premiered on Monday, April 15, 2013 at 8:00 p.m. Eastern/7:00 p.m. Central and ended on June 24, 2013. The show was not renewed for a third season.

== Development ==
It was announced in September 2011 that The CW in conjunction with The Gurin Company and 405 Productions was developing a musical chairs–like game show, Extreme Musical Chairs, that would change the format of the popular game into an extreme multiple round competition. The show was to increase to programming appeal beyond young females. Phil Gurin, who also produced ABC's Shark Tank and The Singing Bee.

== Production ==
The CW ordered ten episodes of Oh Sit!, with the premiere on August 15, 2012 with another episode the next night. On September 26, 2012, Oh Sit! was renewed for a 10-episode second season premiering on Monday, April 15, 2013 and ended on June 24, 2013.

== Format ==
The format is a competitive music chair game where contestants would race through 5 rounds of obstacle courses to reach a chair with eliminations complete with music. The winning contestant would get a cash prize.

Each episode begins with 6 males and 6 females. There are 3 obstacles and 3 bridges in each round. Contestants lap around the track and accumulate a bank for each obstacle completed before the music stops. The dollar values for each obstacle increases with each round. After the music stops they must cross a bridge without falling in the water to claim a chair. Each chair is worth a random amount of money which is added to their bank. The highest chair value is worth $5,000 in rounds 1 and 2, and $10,000 in rounds 3 and 4. In the first round, 2 competitors are eliminated for not finding a chair and 1 is eliminated for having the lowest banked score of the round. In the next 3 rounds, 1 is eliminated for not getting a chair and 1 for having the lowest bank of the round. Contact is allowed, but contestants cannot: grab above the neck, push with the intention to harm another contestant, or push from behind unless the contestant is on a bridge. If any contestant(s) that advanced was found to have broken a rule, that contestant(s) will be disqualified. If any contestants are disqualified, or quit the game between rounds (either voluntarily or due to injury), the last eliminated contestant(s), provided they're medically cleared, will be brought back into the game. If not enough eliminated contestants can return to replace any removed contestants, a reserve will replace the remaining contestant. 3 competitors advance to the final round called "Chair Mountain". Before tackling Chair Mountain, the contestants get 1 final run around the track, with obstacles being worth $1,500 each in both seasons. Typically the winner accumulates a bank between $15,000 and $40,000 during the course of the show, with the chairs alone being worth up to $30,000.

In Season 1 there were 2 female champions, 1 coming in an episode where 2 females were in the final round and 1 in an episode where all 3 finalists were female. Obstacle values were $100 each in round 1, and increased by $50 over the next 3 rounds. 1 chair in each of the 1st 4 rounds awarded no cash.

In Season 2, obstacles and bridges were substantially more difficult than in Season 1, and there were no female champions. Obstacle values still increased by $50 over the 1st 4 rounds, but the values started at $150 in round 1. The $0 chair was also dropped and the lowest value chair increased with each round ($50 in round 1, $100 in round 2, $150 in round 3, and $250 in round 4).

== Reception ==
=== Critical reception ===
The series received a 49 out of 100 aggregate score, based on four early reviews, indicating "mixed or average" reception at Metacritic. The New York Times' Nick Genzlinger called the series "raucous", adding that it is "a hilarious return to the childhood you never had – the fun, danger-filled, almost-anything-goes one." Rob Owen of the Pittsburgh Post-Gazette stated it was "a silly time-waster with terrible commentary by hosts Jamie Kennedy and Jessi Cruickshank." Variety's Brain Lowry stated: "Sitting through an entire episode finally felt like more of an ordeal than fun, especially weathering Cruickshank's litany of jokes (the series credits eight writers, including the three exec producers) about what a slut she is."

=== Season 1 (2012) ===
No.	Original air date	Musical guest	Rating/Share (18–49)	U.S. viewers (millions)
1	August 15, 2012	Kevin Rudolf	0.5/2	1.23
2	August 16, 2012	Far East Movement	0.3/1	0.85
3	August 22, 2012	The Speakers Band	0.4/1	1.07
4	August 23, 2012	Neon Hitch	0.4/1	0.87
5	August 29, 2012	Chiddy Bang	0.4/1	0.98
6	September 5, 2012	Eva Simons	0.4/1	1.08
7	September 12, 2012	Stu Stone	0.4/1	0.88
8	September 19, 2012	Outasight	0.4/1	0.89
9	September 26, 2012	Orianthi	0.4/1	0.87
10	October 3, 2012	Kat Graham	0.3/1	0.91

=== Season 2 (2013) ===
No.	Original air date	Musical guest	Rating/Share (18–49)	U.S. viewers (millions)
11	April 15, 2013	Gin Wigmore	0.4/1	0.94
12	April 22, 2013	Sean Kingston	0.3/1	0.86
13	April 29, 2013	Havana Brown	0.3/1	0.73
14	May 6, 2013	7Lions	0.3/1	0.77
15	May 20, 2013	The Ready Set	0.3/1	0.82
16	May 20, 2013	Taryn Manning	0.2/1	0.62
17	June 3, 2013	RO•SHON	0.2/1	0.64
18	June 10, 2013	Asher Monroe	0.4/1	0.91
19	June 17, 2013	Luciana	0.3/1	0.83
20	June 24, 2013	Aubrey O'Day	0.3/1	1.02
