= Thomas Mikal Ford =

American actor and comedian (1964–2016)

- Ford in Harlem Nights (1989)
- Born: September 5, 1964; Los Angeles, California, U.S.
- Died: October 12, 2016 (aged 52); Newnan, Georgia, U.S.
- Education: Long Beach City College (AA); University of Southern California (BFA)
- Occupations: Actor; comedian
- Years active: 1984–2016
- Spouse: Gina Sasso (m. 1997; div. 2014)
- Children: 2

Thomas Mikal Ford (September 5, 1964 – October 12, 2016) was an American actor and comedian. He was best known for his role as Thomas "Tommy" Strawn in the sitcom Martin, which originally aired from 1992 until 1997. He also had a recurring role as Mel Parker in the sitcom The Parkers from 1999 until 2001. He also was known for his role as Lt. Malcolm Barker on New York Undercover.

== Early life and education ==
Ford was born in Los Angeles and raised in Long Beach, California. His mother worked as a school secretary and his father as a pipe-fitter. As a child, Ford wanted to be a preacher. When he took drama lessons and started acting in high school plays, he decided to go into acting instead. After earning an Associate of Arts from Long Beach City College in 1985, Ford transferred to the University of Southern California, where he graduated with a Bachelor of Fine Arts in acting.

== Career ==
In Martin, Ford played Tommy Strawn; for this role, he received an NAACP Image Awards nomination in 1996 in the category of Outstanding Supporting Actor in a Comedy Series.

After Martin ended, Ford found success in the detective drama New York Undercover as Lieutenant Malcolm Barker. He appeared in the sitcom The Parkers in the recurring role of Nikki's ex-husband and Kim's father, Mel Parker, in seven episodes. He played Ben Cummings in The Power of Passion as one of the characters whose wife cheats on him with the pastor. He was also known as "The Pope of Comedy", due to exposure as a judge in TV One's comedy competition show Bill Bellamy's Who's Got Jokes? In feature films, Ford appeared in the Kid 'n Play movie Class Act as Mink. In Harlem Nights, he played Tommy Smalls, the brother of Arsenio Hall's character. In 1997, he played Detective Siegel in the crime drama Against the Law.

In 1993, Ford directed and produced the play South of Where We Live, about six African-American professionals who return to the communities where they were raised and learn about the social issues that now exist. The play was performed at the Los Angeles Ebony Showcase Theatre, the oldest black theater in the country. Ford chose the Ebony Showcase in order to raise money for the theater, which was in danger of closing. The same year, he directed the play Jonin', a comedy about fraternity life at a historically black college in Washington, D.C.

Ford co-hosted the Texas Gospel Music Awards in 1993 with singer Yolanda Adams and actor Troy Curvey. In 1998, Ford founded a 501(c)(3) nonprofit organization named Be Still and Know. The organization's mission was to build better communities for youth.

Ford wrote two inspirational books for children, titled Positive Attitude and I Am Responsible for Me. Ford spent time traveling to schools to inspire and empower children, and encourage responsibility. In June 2016 (four months before his death), Ford directed a documentary on bullying, entitled Through My Lens Atl; it aired in October 2016, on Aspire TV.

== Personal life and death ==
Ford was married to Gina Sasso from 1997 to 2014. They had two children. Ford moved from Los Angeles to Kendall, Florida around 2001. In 2015, Ford moved to Atlanta where he lived with his girlfriend Viviane Brazil. Ford died from a ruptured abdominal aneurysm on October 12, 2016, at a hospital in the Atlanta area. He was 52 years old.

== Filmography ==
=== Film ===
Year	Title	Role	Notes
1985	Deathly Realities	Hubert/Dr. Russell	Short
1989	Nasty Boys	Payday	TV movie
1989	Harlem Nights	Tommy Smalls	
1990	Q&A	Lubin	
1990	Across the Tracks	Coach Walsh	
1991	The Butcher's Wife	Transvestite	
1992	Brain Donors	Cop	
1992	Class Act	Mink	
1992	Night and the City	Herman	
1993	Mr. Jones	Arnie/Violent Patient	
1995	The Kangaroo	-	
1997	Against the Law	Det. Siegel	
2000	His Woman, His Wife	-	Video
2004	He Say... She Say... But What Does GOD Say?	Deacon Witherspoon	Video
2005	On the Low	Ron Davis	Short
2005	Hitched	Gideon	TV movie
2007	City Teacher	-	
2008	The Club	Rev. Holmes	Short
2008	Stitches	Train Station Man	Short
2009	Love Ain't Suppose to Hurt 2: The Wedding	Eugene	Video
2010	Baby Mama's Club	James	
2012	Sugar Mommas	Quinton	TV movie
2012	Switchin' the Script	Mr. Bostick	
2012	The Good Ole Days	Renaldo	
2012	The Fate of Love	Jason	
2012	To Love and to Cherish	Steve	TV movie
2012	No More Games	Hunter	
2012	The Chronicles of Nathan Gregory	Mr. Sereph	Short
2012	A Boost of Love	Security Guard	Short
2012	Hillbilly Highway	Detective Smith	
2013	Who Did I Marry?	Terrance	
2013	Dreams	Detective Jackson	
2013	The Perfekt Plan	Bone	Short
2013	In the Meantime	Clay	TV movie
2013	Douglass U	Mr. Johnson	
2013	At Mamu's Feet	Raymond Gaines	
2014	4Play	Nathaniel	
2014	For Love or Money	Russell	
2014	Where's the Love?	Husband #1	TV movie
2014	Unspoken Words	Terrance	
2014	Could This Be Love	Carvin	
2014	First Impression	Tommy	
2014	Breeze	Mr. Thomas	
2014	Her Eyez	Harvey	Short
2014	In God's Hands	Pastor Frank	TV movie
2014	Big Losers	Jamaican Hard Worker	
2015	Blaq Gold	Judge Andrew Billups	TV movie
2015	Every Family Has Problems	Jerome	
2016	Love Different	Mr. Chamberlain	
2016	Addiction by Subtraction	Mr. James	Video
2016	Wounded	Father Lawton	Short
2016	Blues for Life	Detective Jones	
2016	The Last Time	Chief Winston	
2016	Beat Street	Chief Carey Sommers	Video
2017	Conflict of Interest	Jordan Winters	
2017	The Ballerina	Etienne Magloire	
2018	Fade Away	Fingers	
2018	He Watches Over Me	James	

=== Television ===
Year	Title	Role	Notes
1987	Kate & Allie	Cop	Episode: "Brother, Can You Spare a Dime?"
1989	A Different World	Lamar Collins	Episode: "The Thing About Women"
1989	Booker	Mickey Maxwell	Episode: "Wheels and Deals: Part 1"
1990	Nasty Boys	Payday	Episode: "The Good, the Bad, and the Nasty"
1990	Singer & Sons	Reggie Patterson	Main Cast
1990	Equal Justice	Ernie Pearl	Episode: "Separate Lives"
1990	Law & Order	Harry Pincher	Episode: "The Reaper's Helper"
1990	Uncle Buck	Rafer Freeman	Recurring Cast
1991	The Flash	Elliot Cotrell	Episode: "Beat the Clock"
1991	Baby Talk	Newborn Baby (voice)	Episode: "Womb with a View"
1991	Veronica Clare	-	Episode: "Slow Violence"
1991	MacGyver	Concasseur	Episode: "Walking Dead"
1992–97	Martin	Thomas "Tommy" Strawn	Main Cast
1993	Living Single	Michael Edwards	Episode: "Whose Date Is It Anyway?"
1998–99	New York Undercover	Lt. Malcolm Barker	Main Cast: Season 4
1999	The Jamie Foxx Show	Marcus	Episode: "Homie, Lover, Friend"
1999–2001	The Parkers	Mel Parker	Recurring Cast: Season 1–2
2000	The Pretender	Pastor Jones	Episode: "Ghosts from the Past"
2001	Judging Amy	Mr. Crow	Episode: "Redheaded Stepchild"
2002	The Proud Family	Mr. Webb (voice)	Episode: "I Had a Dream"
2006–08	Who's Got Jokes?	Pope of Comedy	Recurring Cast
2007	House	Scott	Episode: "Family"
2010	Lens on Talent	Train Station Man	Episode: "Comedy and Producing a Film"
2011	Templeton Pride	Carter Franklin	Episode: "Open for Business"
2011	Let's Stay Together	Minister	Episode: "Together, Forever-Ever?"
2016	Zoe Ever After	James Johnson	Episode: "2 Weddings and an Ass Whooping"
2017	Beauty and the Baller	-	Recurring Cast
