= Steven Ford =

American actor, and son of former U.S. President Gerald Ford

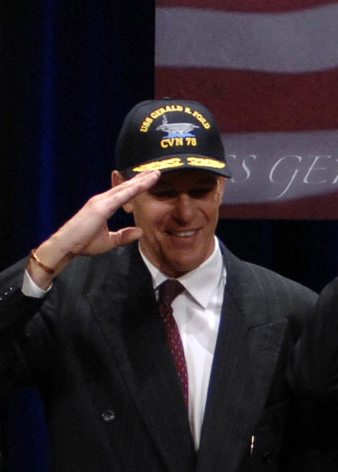
- Ford at the unveiling of a model of the USS Gerald R. Ford (CVN-78) at the Pentagon in 2007
- Born: Steven Meigs Ford; May 19, 1956 (age 70); Washington, DC, U.S.
- Education: Utah State University; California State Polytechnic University
- Occupation: Actor
- Years active: 1980–2007
- Political party: Republican
- Children: 1
- Parents: Gerald Ford (father); Betty Ford (née Bloomer) (mother)
- Relatives: Susan Ford Bales (sister)

Steven Meigs Ford (born May 19, 1956) is an American actor, and the youngest son of former U.S. President Gerald Ford and former First Lady Betty Ford. He is perhaps best known for playing Andy Richards in the soap opera The Young and the Restless.

== Early life ==
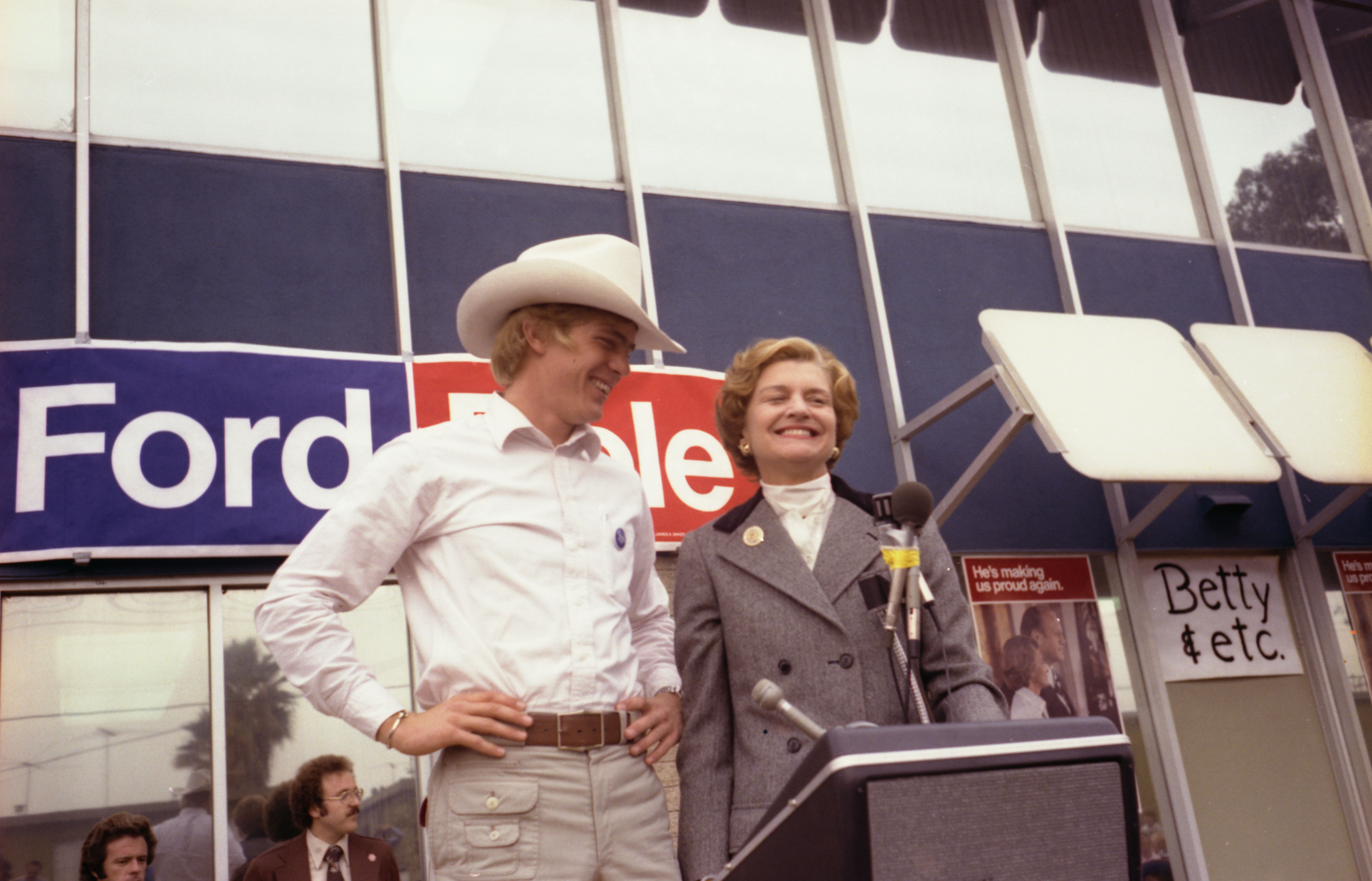
Steven Ford with his mother, Betty Ford, in 1976

Ford is the third child and youngest son of former President Gerald Ford and former First Lady Betty Ford. Ford graduated from T. C. Williams High School in Alexandria, Virginia, on June 13, 1974, at which his father, then Vice President, gave the commencement address. Ford attended Utah State University, studying range management; while his older brother John Gardner (Jack) Ford studied forestry. Ford also attended California State Polytechnic University, Pomona and California Polytechnic State University, San Luis Obispo, where he studied equine studies.

== Career ==
Ford was cast in the film Grease (1978) as Tom Chisum, but dropped out before filming began and was replaced by Lorenzo Lamas, citing stage fright. Ford joined the cast of The Young and the Restless in 1981, creating the role of Private Investigator Andy Richards. He was a regular member of the cast from 1981 to 1987 and briefly from 2002 to 2003. Ford has since appeared in minor roles in a number of films and television series, including Escape from New York, Babylon 5: In the Beginning, Armageddon, Black Hawk Down, Starship Troopers, When Harry Met Sally..., Heat, Contact, and Transformers. From 1992 to 1993, he hosted the short-lived series Secret Service.

== Personal life ==
Ford serves on the board of trustees for the Gerald R. Ford Foundation in Grand Rapids, Michigan. He also acknowledged that he suffered from alcoholism in the late 1980s and early 1990s. Although he still takes on occasional acting assignments, he spends most of his time raising money for charitable organizations and giving speeches and motivational talks to student groups on alcoholism.

In 1991, he announced his engagement to Laura Carlos. Later he said that the marriage plans did not go forward as he was working on his sobriety.

On February 14, 1980, he filed a lawsuit in California to determine if he was the legal father of a boy named Lawrence, born on December 16, 1979, to Joy Malken. He also filed for custody and/or visitation rights. There was "a complete and amicable settlement" very shortly afterward, details being kept private.

On January 9, 2025, Ford read a eulogy written by his father on the occasion of the 2025 state funeral of former President Jimmy Carter, and made reference to his wife at the funeral of President Carter, though she has not been named publicly.

== Filmography ==
=== Film ===
Year	Title	Role	Notes
1980	Cattle Annie and Little Britches	Deputy Marshal	
1981	Escape from New York	Secret Service #2	
1982	Young Doctors in Love	Soap Cameos	
1986	The Eleventh Commandment	Tom Leary	
1989	When Harry Met Sally...	Joe	
1990	Twenty Dollar Star	Jim	
1995	Heat	Officer Bruce	
1996	Eraser	Knoland	
1997	Midnight Blue	Detective Dobkin	
1997	Contact	Major Russell	
1997	Starship Troopers	Lt. Willy	
1997	Against the Law	Lt. Bill Carpenter	
1998	Armageddon	Nuke Tech	
1999	The Rage: Carrie 2	Coach Walsh	
2002	Black Hawk Down	Cribbs	
2007	Transformers	Four Star General	

=== Television ===
Year	Title	Role	Notes
1981	Happy Days	Frankie	Episode: "The Sixth Sense"
1981	The Misadventures of Sheriff Lobo	Rodeo Cowboy	Episode: "Keep on Buckin'"
1982–2003	The Young and the Restless	Andy Richards	212 episodes
1984	The Cowboy and the Ballerina	Wes Butler	Television film
1988	Murder, She Wrote	Drake Eaton	Episode: "Harbinger of Death"
1988	Shooter	Capt. Walker	Television film
1990	Columbo	Toby Ritt	Episode: "Agenda for Murder"
1994	Team Suomi	Willi	Television film
1995	Sirens	Dr. Paul Ravenson	Episode: "The Obsession"
1995	Flipper	F. Scott Blondel	Episode: "F. Scott"
1996	JAG	'Daddy' Dan Austin	Episode: "Hemlock"
1996	Mr. & Mrs. Smith	Frank Parker	Episode: "The Suburban Episode"
1996	Dark Skies	Phillips	Episode: "Ancient Future"
1997	The Beneficiary	Bill Girard	Television film
1997	The Sentinel	Norman Oliver	Episode: "Secret"
1997	Baywatch	Steve Cause	Episode: "Trial by Fire"
1997	Walker, Texas Ranger	D.A. Mark Clark	Episode: "Texas vs. Cahill"
1997	Two Came Back	Lt. Belwick	Television film
1998	Babylon 5: In the Beginning	Prometheus First Officer	Television film
1998	Dr. Quinn, Medicine Woman	Prosecutor Meadows	Episode: "Legend II: Vengeance"
1998	Suddenly Susan	Skip	Episode: "A Tale of Two Pants: Part 2"
1998, 2000	Pensacola: Wings of Gold	Lt. Col. Donald Stuart / Lt. Col. Martin Niles	2 episodes
2001	18 Wheels of Justice	Senator Quentin Young	Episode: "Past Imperfect"

== Bibliography ==
- Wead, Doug, All the President's Children, Atria Books, New York, 2003, ISBN 0743446313
