= David-Simon Dayan =

American artist

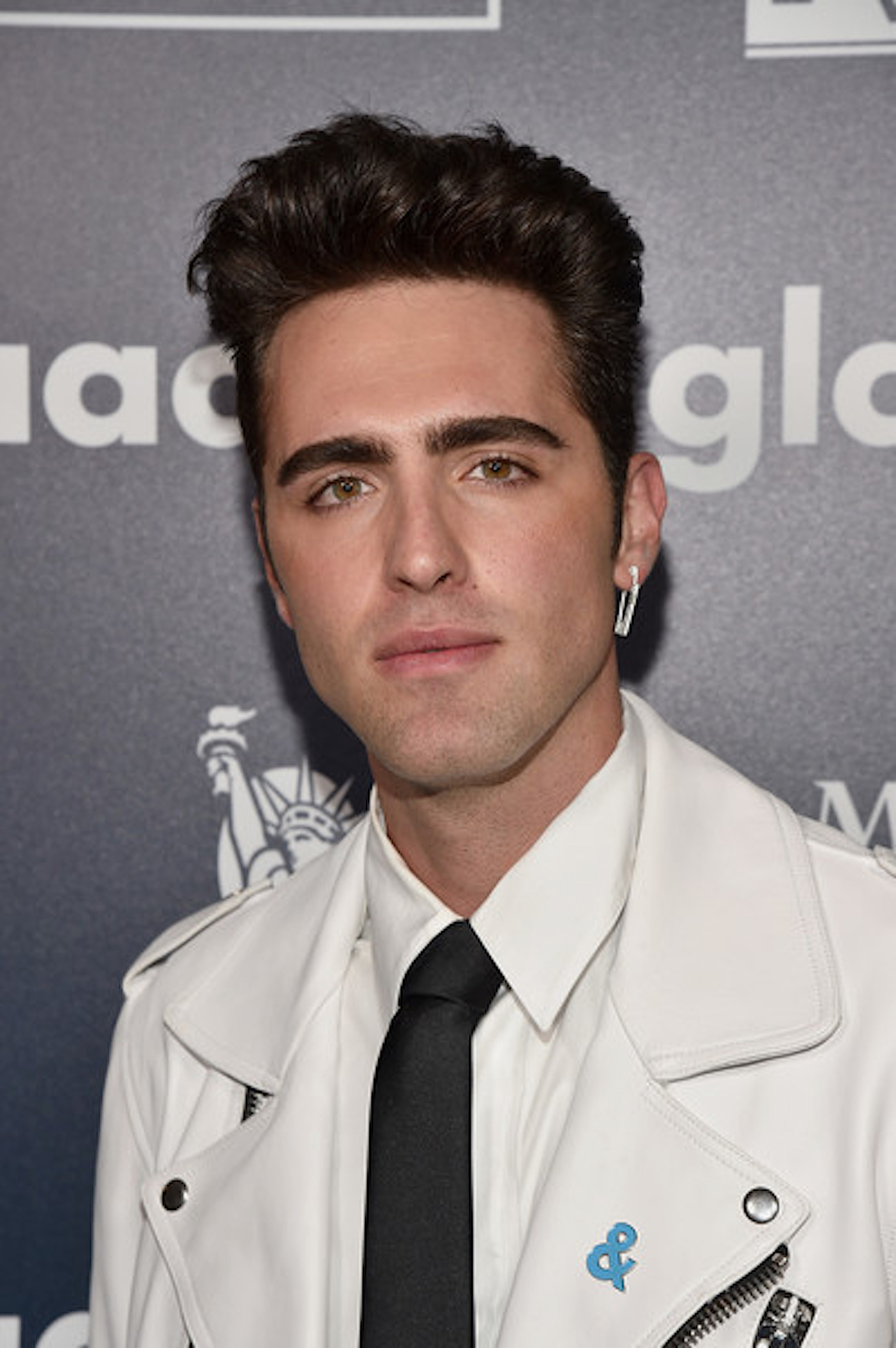
- David-Simon Dayan at the GLAAD Awards.
- Born: David-Simon Dayan; June 30, 1995 (age 31); Los Angeles, California, U.S.
- Occupation: Artist
- Years active: 2017–present
- Website: Sirdavidsimon.com

David-Simon Dayan (born June 30, 1995) is an American artist from Los Angeles, California. He is an actor, filmmaker, writer, and photographer.

His poetry and photographic work have been featured in several prominent publications, such as Vogue, Flaunt, Out, Paper, and Nylon as well as Soho House (club). Currently, the Museum of Fine Arts, Boston exhibits four of his photographic prints, a gift from the Alex Katz Foundation. He is an outspoken animal activist and ongoing supporter of GLAAD and Mercy for Animals.

== Early life ==
Dayan was born in Los Angeles, California and attended New York University and The New School in New York City.

== Career ==
=== 2017–present ===
While in university, his photographic work began being published by fashion magazines. Shortly after, his debut short film, Ego, premiered at the Brooklyn Film Festival and received "Best Art/Experimental" at the NYC Independent film festival 2018. His series featuring James Whiteside and Parker Hill 'Two Male Dancers' was showcased in Out magazine in April 2017. His 35mm series of queer nightlife, Black Paint, often includes public figures such as AnnaSophia Robb, Rose McGowan, and Tinashe, being published in Out magazine titled "Capturing BiCoastal Nightlife in 35mm" and Glassbook magazine, titled Black Paint – Halloween in Summer of 2017.

His nude series 'VEIL' was featured in arts magazine C.A.P. 74024. Later that year, C.A.P. 74024 published his poetry in its "look at me" print issue. In November 2018, Trans March LA enlisted him to aid in programming the inaugural yearly Los Angeles March, which he photographed, later published by Out magazine titled 'MARCH'. His self-portrait series, 'INSPIRATION' was printed in DROME magazine alongside an editorial and interview with Mela Murder of Sean Baker's Oscar-nominated The Florida Project. In 2019, he was featured alongside Love Bailey and Allie X in V magazine issue #V118 covered by Lady Gaga.

Recent publication work includes Emma Corrin for The Times, editorials for Flaunt magazine featuring Jake T. Austin, Ben Barnes, and Ben Aldridge editorials and interviews with artist Patrick Church and Chester Lockhart in Dearboy magazine, Madison Iseman on the cover of VGXW magazine, and one with lead singer Chloe Chaidez of the band Kitten in LoDown magazine. He photographed and interviewed Mean Girls star Jonathan Bennett for the February 2020 cover of A Book Of Magazine.

In early 2021, Dayan photographed Gigi Goode's makeup campaign with brand Christian Audette.

=== "Ballerino" ===
Dayan's debut solo photographic show, Ballerino (2020) was featured in Flaunt, CAP 74024, A Book Of, and various other magazines in which he gave interviews.

=== Poetry ===
Dayan's poetry has been published in CAP 74024 and A Book of Magazine, most notably one titled "i've written you every day".

== Stage ==
| Title | Role | Theatre / Producer |
|---|---|---|
| My Big Gay Italian Wedding | Andrew Polinsky | Hudson Theatre |
| A Lie of the Mind | Frankie | Stella Adler |
| My Big Gay Italian Wedding | Maurizio LeGrande | The Other Space |
| I Am My Own Wife | Charlotte von Mahlsdorf | Stella Adler |
