= The Ballerina =

- Film poster
- Directed by: Steve Pullen
- Written by: Steve Pullen
- Produced by: Peggy Pullen; Steve Pullen; David Mallin
- Starring: Deena Dill; Adella Gautier; Thomas Mikal Ford; Steve Pullen; Isabella Pullen
- Cinematography: David Mallin
- Edited by: Steve Pullen
- Music by: Stefano Lentini
- Production companies: Dancer Company Films; Old Dominion Pictures; 101 Films
- Distributed by: Cinedigm (US) Coffee and Cigarettes Limited (UK)
- Release date: October 20, 2017 (Orlando Film Festival)
- Running time: 106 minutes
- Country: United States
- Language: English

The Ballerina is a 2017 American supernatural horror film, written and directed by Steve Pullen, who stars alongside his daughter, Isabella Pullen, and their other family members. The film also starred Deena Dill, Adella Gautier, and Thomas Mikal Ford. The film premiered at the 2017 Orlando Film Festival.

== Plot ==
Glen Sorenson is nearly involved in a wreck with some Rednecks, while driving his daughter, Sophia, to a ballet recital, but makes a stop at his hunting spot. Later, dirty, Glen has a long beard, and Sophia's ballet costume is in torn up, presumably a great amount of time has lapsed.

In a transient tent camp, a lady, Marjorie Mitchell, knows that Sophia is traumatized by night terrors and visual/auditory hallucinations. She tries to convince Glen to let her bring help, but he declines. Glen looks at family photos that show him with his wife, Jennifer, Sophia, and their three sons.

That evening, they sit around a campfire, with other people in the camp roasting marshmallows. Sophia sees a green lantern, and a young girl that looks normal, and then appears badly burned. Sophia screams and cries, then passing out. Doe, a nurse's aide in camp, says Sophia is having Psychosomatic hallucinations triggered by emotional trauma, and they need help.

Glen tells Doe that Sophia's hallucinations, and night terrors began happening one year ago, when their family died in an accident on the way to Sophia's recital. Child Protective Services was on the verge of taking Sophia, so they hid in the camp. Doe urges him to get help, but he says it's not an option. Doe tries hypnotherapy on Sophia. The next day, Sophia slept well, but the effects are short lived.

The girl with the green lantern returns, and is wearing a girl scout type uniform, introduces herself as Annie, coaxes Sophia out of the tent. Sophia sees more girls with Annie, that are also badly burned and pulls away. Sophia screams, and the next day, draws the girls she saw.

That evening, Father Callihan says children are vulnerable to spirits, and puts his hands on Sophia's head and has a flashback of what she's seen. He tells Glen to stay awake to watch over her. Annie returns, and gives Sophia the locket, with 2 pictures that are of herself and her little brother. The next morning, Sophia is not afraid anymore, and shows Glen the locket. A picture in the locket looks familiar, but Glen can't place it. They now believe Sophia is seeing ghosts, and they need help from a medium.

Therese Magloire, a medium, holds a seance and she translated by her Etienne. Therese is over taken by an unseen force, and she sees six little girls sitting with them around the campfire, in the girl ranger uniforms. Therese has a flashback and sees them in an old car from the 1950s, and in a horrific accident, killing them all, and they were badly burned. They walk away as Therese tries to get them to stay. Therese says if Sophia talks to the girls, it may help them understand.

Glen researches and finds information about the wreck. "Annie" is actually his aunt, who was killed 66 years ago. The boy in the locket is his father, Hank. Annie comes back and gets Sophia to follow her. Glen notices she is gone, and frantically looks for her. Annie and the other girls lead her to a pond and push her in the water. She manages to cling to the tree, she asks why they are doing this and they signal her to look down at something in the water. Glen has a flashback to the day of the recital, Sophia stayed in the truck, and it gets dark. Sophia sees a car pulling up, so she hid on the floor board. The Rednecks from the incident earlier peer around the truck, but it is locked, so they keep walking. They come back, and Sophia gets out of the car.

Seeing them at the truck, Glen orders them to leave at gunpoint. Glen notices she's gone, and goes to look for her. In the present, he reaches the pond, and wades across to get her. In the past, Glen looks for her, and a Redneck hits him in the head with the gun, knocking him out. In the present, Glen stumbles in the pond, and no longer sees Sophia. In the past, Glen regains consciousness and resumes searching for Sophia. When he asks what they did to her, they motion him to look in the water, and he sees Sophia's skeletal remains there. In the past, Glen calls Jennifer and a police officer has her put him on speaker phone, stating it is now 3:30am, and he lost her around 7pm. In the present, he cries hysterically while holding her remains. In the past, the police arrive and search for her. In the present, Sophia now appears to Glen as she did that day, he apologizes to her, and she forgives him. The next day, Glen's father Hank meets him in the woods to tell him to go home to his family and make it right, because they're still alive.

He gets there to find that they cannot hear him because he is dead. In a flashback 21 days after Sophia went missing, the prospects are grim. Severely depressed, Glen committed suicide. After visiting his family, Glen learns that everyone else in that camp are dead people that don't realize it. They keep walking and see Sophia waiting for them.

== Cast ==
- Isabella Pullen as Sophia Sorenson
- Steve Pullen as Glen Sorenson
- Valli Downey as Marjorie Mitchell
- Deena Dill as Doe Peterson
- Del Crawford as Brian Peterson
- Aiden Dunlap as Jack Peterson
- Adella Gautier as Therese Magloire
- Thomas Mikal Ford as Etienne Magloire

== Production ==
The film was shot on location in Franklin and Norfolk, Virginia in March 2014. The movie is credited as the first full-length feature film to be worked on by the film department of Old Dominion University.

The film was one of Thomas Mikal Ford's last roles before his death in October 2016.

== Release ==
The film was released on October 20, 2017 at the Orlando Film Festival, where it won Best Poster and Best Screenplay. It was also nominated for Best Actor, Best Director, and Best Picture. The Ballerina was released in the United States on DVD on May 1, 2018. The Film was released in DVD and Digital formats by 101 Films in the United Kingdom on February 5, 2018.

== Reception ==
Writing for Cryptic Rock, Jeannie Blue, gave the film 3 out of 5 stars, saying that "The Ballerina is most intriguing in its failure to realize any of its potential: the cast – many of whom are making their acting debuts here – are good-to-excellent in their roles, with adorable Isabella Pullen giving a stellar performance in the role of Sophia."

FrightFest critic, Chris Ward, said "The Ballerina is an ambitious film that was assembled as an obvious labour of love for Steve Pullen but its creative and budgetary limitations hold it back from being a whole lot more than what it ends up being."

Nerdly critic, Phil Wheat, said "There's some decent, and thankfully spooky, imagery at work here but that can’t compensate for the lack of any other real substance to the film."
