= Kirsten Stoltmann =

American artist

Kirsten Stoltmann is an artist based in Los Angeles.

Stoltmann was born in Milwaukee. Her art career began in video but has progressed to embrace object-making. Her work references her Midwestern roots, feminism, sexuality, adolescent culture and self-deprecating humour.

== Selected exhibitions ==
2006

I Know What I'm Doing, Wallspace, New York

Boys and Flowers, Western Bridge, Seattle

Jonathan Vyner/Fortescue Avenue, London

2005

Adjoining the Voids, (in collaboration with Sterling Ruby), Sister Gallery, Los Angeles

2004

Imitations of Life, De Balie Cinema, Amsterdam

Renegade, 1R Gallery, Chicago

2003

Transference, The Russian Contemporary Art Centers in Ekantrinburg and Kaliningrad

Art Video Lounge, (curated by Chrissie Isles), Art Basel Miami Beach

Behind The Pedestal, (in collaboration with Sterling Ruby), Bower Gallery, San Antonio

Dinner and A Movie: Women in the Director's Chair, Chicago

2001

Art/Music: Rock, Pop, Techno, the Museum of Contemporary Art, Sydney

2000

Pretend TV, La Panaderia, Mexico City
