= White garlic =

White garlic may refer to:

- Garlic, cultivated forms of Allium sativum with white bulbs
- Allium neapolitanum, a wild plant native to the Mediterranean and Middle East
