= Angie Waller =

Angie Waller is a visual artist who has lived in Los Angeles, California, and New York City. She has created works based on data mining and those that feature found objects in videos, installations and websites.

== Career ==
Waller used the data-mining technique to develop her 2003 Data Mining the Amazon, a limited-edition work based on a feature of used by Amazon.com where purchasers are told what other buyers had also purchased. She discovered "associations between pop culture and books that described a specific political ideology."

Armored Cars: Protect Yourself From Ballistic Attacks was a 2009 video and photographic collage compiled from marketing materials produced by manufacturers of armored cars which The New York Times noted as playing "to post-9/11 insecurities and the fears of the wealthy in politically unstable regions." Charissa N. Terranova, a professor of aesthetic studies at the University of Texas at Dallas, compared Waller's "own process of video fabrication" to "the fabrication of corporate truth as a ploy in the marketing of armored cars."

In 2010 Waller wrote Originality Compass and Copyright Law, a work consisting of quotations from U.S. copyright cases that was displayed in both New York and Mexico. In 2011 she rebound 45 books in identical covers, with similar foiled titles, all of which contained the word unknown. As part of the project, she began a quarterly online newsletter entitled "We provide timely information you didn't know you didn't know." Another piece was Most Searched Fears, mounted in 2012, which was a word cloud printed by letterpress in glow in the dark type so that visitors had to stand behind a dark curtain or in a dark room to see it.

She has also presented The Most Boring Places in the World, 2009, an interactive site organized into a Google Maps tour, which features every mention of the phrase "the most boring place in the world" in chatrooms and in blogs and live journals that she could find from January 10 to May 1, 2009. The quotations are paired with satellite images of cities and towns.
