= Michele O'Marah =

American artist (born 1967)

Michele O’Marah
- Born: Michele O’Marah; 1967; Vallejo, California, U.S.
- Education: Tyler School of Art, Philadelphia
- Known for: Photography, Film, Video
- Notable work: Valley Girl (2002)
- Awards: Artists Resource Completion Grant from the Durfee Foundation, 2009, Finalist, Artadia Los Angeles, 2013, Grant for Cultural Innovation, from the Center for Cultural Innovation, 2014

Michele O'Marah (born 1967) is an American video artist. Her works have been named among the best of 2002 and the best of 2010 by Artforum.

O'Marah was born 1967 in Vallejo, California. She earned a B.F.A. from Tyler School of Art in Philadelphia, majoring in photography.

O'Marah often remakes and reinterprets films, interviews, and other media. In the 2001 White Diamonds, Agent Orange, she recreated a 1970 60 Minutes interview with Elizabeth Taylor and Richard Burton and paired the remade interview with a fictionalization of the Vietnam War. A critic in Flash Art reviewed the installation unfavorably, commenting that it "left you with a sinking feeling that artists are fiddling around while Rome is burning."

In 2002, O'Marah created a full-length remake of the 1983 cult film Valley Girl on an extremely low budget, casting artist friends in the video and using a borrowed video camera. Discussing the project in a later interview, she stated, "[M]y idea was to fail the original Valley Girl. One person cannot replicate the job of an 80-person film crew. So I thought that my Valley Girl would be a process piece where the video would at times be a dismal failure...because I could never perfectly re-create the original." She also stated, "I wanted my video to expose the underlying myth of the original: that Prince Charming will pursue you to the ends of the earth... The idea of remaking it and making the construction of my video really obvious just acknowledged that the story is a construction, too." Writing in Artforum, Bruce Hainley called the work "a guerrilla tour de force and a heady meditation on the simple act of doing something again" and praised it simultaneously "entertainment, a document of a time period and locale, a DIY manifesto, a feminist commentary with acute style, and a meditation on continuity."

In 2006, O'Marah worked with David Jones and Tim Jackson to create the video Faustus's Children, a take on the Faust legend. In the melodramatic video, non-actors "deliver an amusingly fraught dialogue reflecting on the hubris of the haute bourgeoisie."

In 2007, O'Marah again recreated a historic interview, remaking the 1973 Firing Line interview of Black Panther leader Huey P. Newton by conservative author William F. Buckley.

Her 2010 project A Girls' Gotta Do What a Girl's Gotta Do remade three scenes from the 1996 Pamela Anderson film Barb Wire.

== Selected works ==
- 1997 - For Those About To Rock
- 2001 - White Diamonds/Agent Orange
- 2002 - Valley Girl
- 2004 - Peacehead
- 2006 - Faustus's Children, a single-channel video created with David Jones and Tim Jackson
- 2007 - How Goes it with the Black Movement?
- 2010 - A Girls' Gotta Do What a Girl's Gotta Do
- 2012 - Blow Me!
