= List of Matilda and the Ramsay Bunch episodes =

Matilda and the Ramsay Bunch is a British CBBC cooking entertainment program with the first series airing in April 2015 with first airing on 14 April 2015 and finished on 21 July 2015. The series was renew for a second series in early 2015 and began airing on 6 May 2016 and finished on 12 August 2016. On 19 July 2016 it was confirmed by CBBC that the series was renewed for a third series which began airing on 5 May 2017 and finished on 11 August 2017.

It was announced in July 2017 that the series had been that the show was renewed for a fourth series, which is due begin broadcast on 24 April 2018. The series follows the Ramsay Family as they go on their summer holidays around America and the United Kingdom as Tilly cooks up her favourite meals and while the rest of the Ramsay family go on adventures and take part in different challenges and games.

As of 26 July 2019, 75 episodes of Matilda and the Ramsay Bunch have aired.

== Series overview ==
Series	Episodes	Originally released	
Series	Episodes	First released	Last released
1	15	14 April 2015	21 July 2015
2	15	6 May 2016	12 August 2016
3	15	5 May 2017	11 August 2017
4	15	24 April 2018	31 July 2018

== Episodes ==
=== Series 1 (2015) ===
No. overall	No. in series	Title	Guest(s)	Location	Original release date	UK viewers (Thousands)
1	1	The LA Arrival	N/A	Los Angeles	14 April 2015	229,000
2	2	The Movies	N/A	Los Angeles	21 April 2015	161,000
3	3	The Monster Party	N/A	Los Angeles	28 April 2015	Outside top 10
4	4	The Beach BBQ	N/A	Los Angeles	5 May 2015	184,000
5	5	The Big Food Fight	N/A	Los Angeles	12 May 2015	337,000
6	6	The Bollywood Party	N/A	Los Angeles	19 May 2015	198,000
7	7	The US Sportsday	N/A	Los Angeles	26 May 2015	Outside top 10
8	8	The Sleepover	N/A	Los Angeles	2 June 2015	260,000
9	9	The pool Party	N/A	Los Angeles	9 June 2015	Outside top 10
10	10	The Karaoke Party	N/A	Los Angeles	16 June 2015	165,000
11	11	The LA Makeover	N/A	Los Angeles	23 June 2015	243,000
12	12	Fitness Training	N/A	Los Angeles	30 June 2015	Outside top 10
13	13	The Mexican Party	N/A	Los Angeles	7 July 2015	Outside top 10
14	14	The Daredevils	N/A	Los Angeles	14 July 2015	159,000
15	15	The Big Goodbye	N/A	Los Angeles	21 July 2015	Outside top 10

=== Series 2 (2016) ===
No. overall	No. in series	Title	Guest(s)	Location	Original release date	UK viewers (Thousands)
16	1	The Competition	N/A	Los Angeles	BBC iPlayer air date: 29 April 2016; Television air date: 6 May 2016	Outside top 10
17	2	The Drive-In	Cruz Beckham. Cookie Monster	Los Angeles	13 May 2016	200,000
18	3	The Wild West	N/A	Los Angeles	20 May 2016	203,000
19	4	The TV Show	James Corden	Los Angeles	27 May 2016	Outside top 10
20	5	The Sea Lion Rescue	N/A	Los Angeles	3 June 2016	Outside top 10
21	6	The Big Trip	N/A	Los Angeles	5 June 2015	Outside top 10
22	7	The Day Off	N/A	Los Angeles	17 June 2016	Outside top 10
23	8	The Number One Sport	N/A	Los Angeles	19 June 2016	165,000
24	9	The Concert	The Vamps	Los Angeles	1 July 2016	184,000
25	10	The Ramsay Pirates	N/A	Cornwall	8 July 2016	Outside top 10
26	11	The Beach Race	N/A	Cornwall	15 July 2016	Outside top 10
27	12	The Birthday	N/A	Cornwall	22 July 2016	302,000
28	13	The Massive Jump	N/A	Cornwall	29 July 2016	189,000
29	14	The Last Day of Summer	N/A	London	5 August 2016	Outside top 10
30	15	The Holiday Final	N/A	London	12 August 2016	127,000

=== Series 3 (2017) ===
No. overall	No. in series	Title	Guest(s)	Location	Original release date	UK viewers (Thousands)
31	1	The Ramsays Are Go	N/A	London	5 May 2017	233,000
32	2	The B Ball Match	N/A	Los Angeles	12 May 2017	Outside top 10
33	3	The Big Zen	N/A	Los Angeles	19 May 2017	270,000
34	4	Return of the Jack	N/A	Los Angeles	26 May 2017	120,000
35	5	The Toughest Challenge Ever	N/A	Los Angeles	2 June 2017	146,000
36	6	LA Dogs	N/A	Los Angeles	9 June 2017	Outside top 10
37	7	Grand Prix	N/A	Los Angeles	16 June 2017	162,000
38	8	The Wedding Anniversary	Alondra Santos	Los Angeles	23 June 2017	277,000
39	9	The Lip Sync Challenge	N/A	Los Angeles	30 June 2017	Outside top 10
40	10	The Fishing Trip	N/A	Los Angeles	7 July 2017	168,000
41	11	The Ramsay Games	N/A	Los Angeles	14 July 2017	Outside top 10
42	12	The BBQ Beef	N/A	Los Angeles	21 July 2017	Outside top 10
43	13	The Ramsay Vloggers	Bryce Dallas Howard; Aaron Jackson; Marcus Henderson	Los Angeles	28 July 2017	Outside top 10
44	14	The Old Man's Birthday	N/A	London	4 August 2017	Outside top 10
45	15	The Ramsays Connected	N/A	London	11 August 2017	Outside top 10

=== Series 4 (2018) ===
No. overall	No. in series	Title	Guest(s)	Location	Original release date	UK viewers (Thousands)
46	1	The Sunday Lunch	N/A	London	24 April 2018	177,000
47	2	The Survivalists	N/A	London	1 May 2018	147,000
48	3	The White Water Rush	Joe Clarke	London	8 May 2018	209,000
49	4	The Marathon Girl	Mo Farah, Tom Daley, Joe Clarke	London	15 May 2018	outside top 10
50	5	The Big Bike Bite	N/A	London	22 May 2018	N/A
51	6	The Snake Boy	N/A	London	29 May 2018	N/A
52	7	La Festa Italians: Part One	N/A	Italy	5 June 2018	N/A
53	8	La Festa Italians: Part Two	N/A	Italy	12 June 2018	N/A
54	9	The Make-over	N/A	London	19 June 2018	N/A
55	10	The Dragon Racers	N/A	London	26 June 2018	N/A
56	11	The Hospital Challenge	N/A	London	3 July 2018	N/A
57	12	The Ballerinos	N/A	London	10 July 2018	N/A
58	13	The Perfect Day	N/A	Cornwall	17 July 2018	N/A
59	14	The Lifeboat Rescue	N/A	Cornwall	24 July 2018	N/A
60	15	The Ramsays Return	N/A	Cornwall	31 July 2018	N/A

=== Series 5 (2019) ===
No. overall	No. in series	Title	Guest(s)	Original release date	UK viewers (Thousands)
61	1	High Stakes	N/A	19 April 2019	N/A
62	2	The Scariest Ride	N/A	26 April 2017	N/A
63	3	The Coolest Sport in LA	N/A	3 May 2017	N/A
64	4	The Fresh Eggs of Bel Air	N/A	10 May 2017	N/A
65	5	The Ramsay Prankers	N/A	17 May 2017	N/A
66	6	The Disappearing Dad	N/A	24 May 2017	N/A
67	7	The Total Wipe-outs	N/A	31 May 2017	N/A
68	8	The Hollywood Actor	N/A	7 June 2017	N/A
69	9	The Game	N/A	14 June 2019	N/A
70	10	The Crazy Californians	N/A	21 June 2019	N/A
71	11	The Fastest Food	N/A	28 June 2019	N/A
72	12	The Cornish Cake-off	N/A	5 July 2019	N/A
73	13	The Big Dad Challenge	N/A	12 July 2019	N/A
74	14	The Banging Race	N/A	19 July 2019	N/A
75	15	The Last Day of Summer	N/A	26 July 2019	N/A
