= Hrag Yedalian =

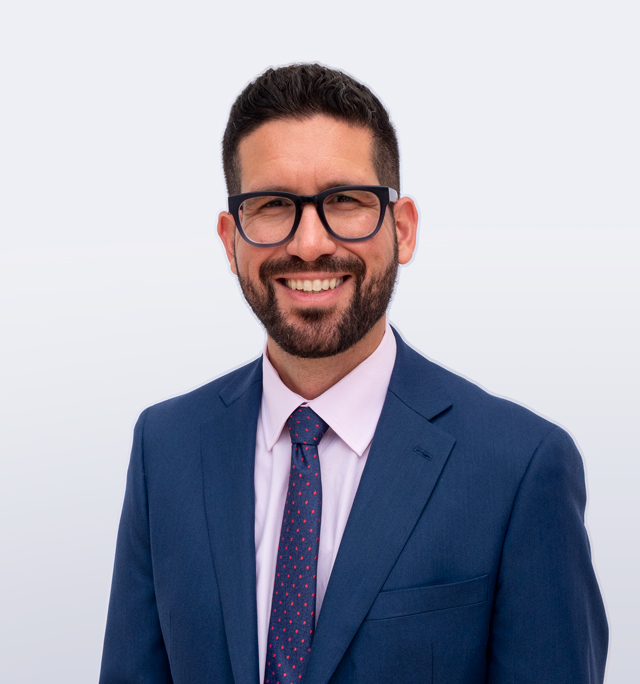
Hrag Yedalian

Hrag Varoujan Yedalian (born December 14, 1981, in Los Angeles County, California) is an Armenian-American political consultant and documentary film director and producer. He is a graduate of the University of California, Berkeley and holds a Masters of Public Administration degree from the University of Southern California. He has attended UCLA School of Law and studied film editing at the AFI Conservatory. Hrag runs the Los Angeles-based consulting firm Blue State Campaigns. His work has been featured in Rolling Stone, The Hollywood Reporter, and San Francisco Chronicle. He previously worked at Steven Spielberg’s organization, the USC Shoah Foundation.

== Filmography ==
- Beneath the Ashes: The Past Reimagined (Documentary Short) (2025)
- Advantage Player (2025)
- Animus (2023)
- Dead Connection (2023)
- Amber (Music Video) Serj Tankian featuring Sevak Amroyan (2022)
- In Search of Boozers and Schmucks (Documentary Short) (2022)
- System of A Down (Music Video Behind the Scenes) Protect the Land (2020)
- Karabian: A Glimpse Into a Statesman's Life (2018)
- The Ballerino (2011)
- Dr. J. Michael Hagopian Tribute (2010)
- The People's Advocate: The Life and Times of Charles R. Garry, about radical attorney Charles Garry (2007)
- Cowboys and Indians (Short film) as an editor

== Awards ==
- Winner of Arpa Foundation for Film, Music and Art’s Best Documentary Film at the Arpa International Film Festival
- Mediamaker Award Winner at the 2007 BAVC (Bay Area Video Coalition) Awards
- Official Selection at the Mill Valley Film Festival
- Official Selection at the Ann Arbor Film Festival
- Official Selection at the San Francisco International Documentary Festival
