= Tana Ramsay =

English television personality and author (born 1974)

- Born: Cayetana Elizabeth Hutcheson; 23 August 1974 (age 52); Croydon, London, England
- Occupations: Cookbook author, television presenter
- Spouse: Gordon Ramsay (m. 1996)
- Children: 6, including Tilly
- Relatives: Adam Peaty (son-in-law)
- Writing career
- Period: 2006–present
- Subject: Food
- Notable works: Tana Ramsay's Family Kitchen (2006); Tana Ramsay's Real Family Food (2007); Homemade (2008); Tana Ramsay's Kitchen Secrets (2010)

Cayetana Elizabeth "Tana" Ramsay (née Hutcheson; born 23 August 1974) is an English TV broadcaster and author of several cookery books.

== Early life ==
Cayetana Elizabeth Hutcheson was born in Croydon, South London, United Kingdom, and raised on a farm in Kent. Her father, Chris Hutcheson, is a businessman. Cayetana worked for her father before pursuing a career in education.

== Career ==
Ramsay trained as a Montessori teacher.

In 2010, Ramsay appeared on the ITV show Dancing on Ice, partnered by professional skater Stuart Widdall, being eliminated in the fourth week. She has been a presenter of UKTV's food show Market Kitchen. In 2013, she often appeared on Gordon Ramsay's Home Cooking to teach home cooking alongside her husband. In 2014, she appeared in the American version of cooking show MasterChef, co-hosted by her husband, Gordon Ramsay, and also Gordon's other show Hell's Kitchen, which she featured on three episodes between 2009 and 2010. Since 2015, Ramsay has starred in her daughter's show Matilda and the Ramsay Bunch on CBBC.

== Personal life ==
Tana married Gordon Ramsay in London on 21 December 1996. They divide their time between Los Angeles and the Wandsworth Common area of London. They have six children: Megan, fraternal twins Holly and Jack, Matilda/Tilly, Oscar, and Jesse. In 2016, their son Rocky was born prematurely at 20 weeks, and died shortly thereafter. According to Gordon, they would not have had Oscar had it not been for the tragedy of Rocky. Oscar was the first child born afterward, three years later. In an interview, Gordon Ramsay detailed how he and his wife struggled to conceive due to her polyendocrine metabolic ovarian syndrome (PMOS).
