= Tilly Ramsay =

English media presenter and chef (born 2001)

- Born: Matilda Elizabeth Ramsay; 8 November 2001 (age 24); London, England
- Education: University of Nottingham (BSc)
- Occupations: Television presenter and television chef
- Years active: 2005–present
- Employers: BBC; ITV
- Known for: Matilda and the Ramsay Bunch
- Parents: Gordon Ramsay; Tana Hutcheson
- Relatives: Adam Peaty (brother-in-law)

Matilda Elizabeth "Tilly" Ramsay (born 8 November 2001) is an English television presenter, cook and social media influencer best known for presenting the BBC cooking show Matilda and the Ramsay Bunch on CBBC alongside her family. The daughter of Gordon and Tana Ramsay, she has made numerous television appearances including This Morning, Gordon Ramsay's Home Cooking, Blue Peter, MasterChef Junior, Friday Night Jazz, and The Late Late Show with James Corden. She was also a contestant on the nineteenth series of Strictly Come Dancing. Ramsay was also a contestant on Celebrity MasterChef Australia, where she reached the final.

== Early life and career ==
Matilda Elizabeth Ramsay is the fourth child of Gordon James Ramsay and Cayetana Elizabeth "Tana" Hutcheson. She was born in London on 8 November 2001, her father's 35th birthday. Her five siblings are Megan, fraternal twins Holly and Jack, Oscar, and Jesse. Ramsay was raised in Wandsworth, South West London, and divides her time between there and Los Angeles for her father's television career. From a young age, Ramsay followed in her father's footsteps and has become a cook.

Before Ramsay started presenting Matilda and the Ramsay Bunch on CBBC, she made several appearances on her father's TV shows MasterChef Junior and Hell's Kitchen from 2010 to 2018.

In 2013, Matilda appeared alongside her father on Gordon Ramsay's Home Cooking to teach home cooking. Her mother, Tana, also would appear on occasion.

In 2015, it was announced that Ramsay would host her own cooking and entertainment show on CBBC. Matilda and the Ramsay Bunch, which is aimed at the younger audience, stars all the members of the Ramsay family as they go on their summer holidays. The first series was aired on 14 April 2015, with the second series airing 6 May 2016 and the third series airing on 5 May 2017. Each series is made up of 15 episodes.

Matilda's sister, Megan Ramsay, ran the London Marathon in 2017 in memory of their unborn baby brother Rocky, after her mother suffered a miscarriage five months into her pregnancy in June 2016.

It was announced in June 2017 that Ramsay's CBBC show Matilda and the Ramsay Bunch had been renewed for a fourth series to air in 2018. The fourth series began on 24 April 2018.

In September 2018, Tilly, alongside her father, appeared on the ITV show This Morning in a series of cooking segments titled "Big Chef Little Chef" involving the Ramsays cooking meals and trying to help children get into cooking.

Ramsay made an appearance on season 18 of Hell's Kitchen as a special guest in the eighth episode, where the dinner service was centred around her Sweet 16 birthday party.

Ramsay lends her voice to the All3Media-owned company One Potato Two Potato, originally a joint venture between Optomen and her father, where she says the company name in a singalong style.

In 2021, Ramsay competed in the nineteenth series of Strictly Come Dancing and was partnered with professional dancer Nikita Kuzmin. On 28 November 2021, she became the ninth celebrity to be eliminated from the competition.

On 12 October 2023, it was announced that Ramsay will join MasterChef Junior as a new judge in its ninth season, alongside returning judges, her father Gordon Ramsay, Aarón Sánchez, and Daphne Oz.

In 2024, Ramsay graduated from the University of Nottingham with a degree in psychology.

== Filmography ==
Year	Title	Role	Notes
2005, 2006	The F Word	Herself	Recurring (series 1)
2010–2018	Hell's Kitchen	Herself	Recurring guest; 4 episodes
2015, 2018, 2024	MasterChef Junior	Herself	Guest, season 3 episode 5 Guest, season 6 episode 7. Judge - Season 9
2015–2019	Matilda and the Ramsay Bunch	Herself	Presenter; 5 series
2015, 2016	The One Show	Herself	Guest
2016	Blue Peter	Herself	1 episode "Fathers Day Special"
2017	Sam & Mark's Big Friday Wind-Up	Herself	Guest
2017	The F Word	Herself	Guest episode 4 and 7
2021	Celebrity MasterChef Australia	Contestant	Series 2
2021	Strictly Come Dancing	Contestant	Series 19
2022	Gordon Ramsay: Uncharted Showdown	Contestant	Guest on episode 3
2025	Dish it out	Herself	Presenter
2026	Being Gordon Ramsay	Herself	Recurring

== Awards and nominations ==
Year	Award	Category	Result
2015	Children's BAFTA	Children's Entertainment	Nominated
2015	Children's BAFTA	Kids' Vote Television	Nominated
2016	Children's BAFTA	Entertainment	Nominated

== Bibliography ==
In March 2015, Ramsay announced that she had written her first cookery book based on the CBBC show of the same name. The book was released on 4 May 2017.

- Matilda & The Ramsay Bunch: Tilly's Kitchen Takeover (2017) ISBN 978-1473652255
