= Amy's =

Amy's may refer to:

== Companies ==
- Amy's Candy Bar
- Amy's Ice Creams
- Amy's Kitchen

== Laws ==
- Amy's Law (Georgia)
- Amy's Law (Ohio)

== Media ==
- "Amy's Back in Austin", a 1994 song by Little Texas
- Amy's Baking Company, an episode of Kitchen Nightmares
- Amy's Choice (Doctor Who)
- Amy's Eyes, a 1985 novel
- "Amy's Eyes" (song), a 1989 song
- Amy's Orgasm, a 2001 film
- "Amy's Song", a 2011 single by Brent Anderson
- Amy's View, a 1997 play

== Sports ==
- Amy's Kitchen-Perpetual (also known as Amy's Spikers)
- Amy's Ride
