= Patricia Llewellyn =

British television producer (1962–2017)

- Born: 7 February 1962; Carmarthen, Wales, UK
- Died: 22 October 2017 (aged 55)
- Occupation: TV producer
- Known for: Producer of cooking programmes

Patricia Llewellyn (7 February 1962 – 22 October 2017) was a British television producer and managing director of the television production company, Optomen, which in 2010 became part of the All3Media group.

Llewellyn was born in Carmarthen, West Wales, and became best known for her work on cookery programmes. In 2002, the annual Glenfiddich Food and Drink Awards bestowed upon Llewellyn the Independent Spirit Award for her "progressive and confident approach to food and drink broadcasting". She acquired a reputation as a starmaker, having built hit series around previously unknown chefs, such as Two Fat Ladies with Jennifer Paterson and Clarissa Dickson Wright; and The Naked Chef with Jamie Oliver, for which she won her first BAFTA. Her other credits include Heston's Feasts, winner of a Royal Television Society Award; Ramsay's Kitchen Nightmares, winner of two BAFTAs, an International Emmy and a Grierson Award; and another food-related TV series, The F Word, featuring chef Gordon Ramsay.

Llewellyn also acted as co-producer of several American cookery and reality television programmes, such as Kitchen Nightmares, Masterchef, Hotel Hell, and Masterchef Jr.

Llewellyn had success finding on-screen talent outside the culinary world: the BBC2 series Mary Queen of Shops launched the career of television presenter Mary Portas; and Two Men in a Trench, also for BBC2, introduced archaeologist and historian Neil Oliver to television audiences. Llewellyn was also executive producer for The F***ing Fulfords, a BAFTA nominated documentary for Channel 4.

As the managing director of Optomen, Llewellyn led the company through a period of rapid growth. When Llewellyn joined Optomen, its gross annual revenue was under £10m, but by 2014, according to the Broadcast Annual Survey, it ranked seventh among independent production companies in the UK with annual revenue of over £57m. Optomen now has production offices in London, New York and Los Angeles.

Her death from metastatic breast cancer was announced on 24 October 2017.
