= Amy's Law =

Amy's Law refers to at least two statutes:

- Amy's Law (Ohio), requiring violent offenders to appear before a judge before being released on bail/bond
- Amy's Law (Georgia), permitting greater latitude in felony sentencing of juveniles
