= Mary Portas =

English retail consultant (born 1960)

Mary Portas OBE
- Born: Mary M. Newton; 28 May 1960 (age 66); Watford, Hertfordshire, England
- Education: Holy Rood Junior School Watford, St Joan of Arc Convent, Rickmansworth Hertfordshire
- Alma mater: Watford School of Art
- Occupation: Retail consultant
- Known for: Television presenter, author, Portas Agency Founder & Chief Creative Officer
- Spouses: Graham Portas (m. 1990; div. 2003) Melanie Rickey (m. 2014; sep. 2019)
- Children: 3

Mary Margaret Portas OBE (née Newton; born 28 May 1960) is an English retail consultant and broadcaster who hosts retail- and business-related television shows. Portas was appointed by David Cameron, the British Prime Minister, to lead a review into the future of Britain's high streets.

== Early life and education ==
Portas was the fourth child of five siblings, born into a Catholic and Protestant Irish family in a small end-of-terrace in Windsor Road in north Watford. She attended Holy Rood Catholic Junior School (in north Watford) and then St Joan of Arc, a Catholic grammar School in Rickmansworth. Her Fermanagh-born Catholic mother died of encephalitis when Portas was 16. At 18 Portas turned down a place she had won at the Royal Academy of Dramatic Art to look after her younger brother. Her father soon remarried but died of a heart attack two years later. He left his house to his wife, leaving Portas and her brother homeless, relying on the kindness of other people, and living with family friends.

== Career ==
Portas started her career in retail with a Saturday job in John Lewis. She then had a part-time, and later a full-time, job with Harrods where she was responsible for window displays for about three years, before joining Topshop as display manager. While in this job, she was spotted by Burton Group chairman Ralph Halpern.

Her next role brought Portas her first taste of fame and public acclaim, as creative director of Harvey Nichols. Portas is credited with turning Harvey Nichols into a leading modern fashion brand. She created the Harvey Nichols window displays that became part of the guided tours of London, one of her most famous displays was "Autumn Intrusion", a commission by artist Thomas Heatherwick that won a D&AD Gold award in 1997. She then persuaded the store's owners to use younger designers, and gained publicity in the BBC's Absolutely Fabulous series in the 1990s, after promising writer and star of the show Jennifer Saunders the run of the store for research in return for Saunders namechecking the business. By the age of 30, Portas was a member of the company's board.

In 1997, Portas left Harvey Nichols to launch an agency, Yellowdoor, producing campaigns for clients including Clarks, Louis Vuitton, Oasis Stores, Swarovski, Dunhill, Boden, Thomas Pink, Patek Philippe and Mercedes-Benz, Sainsbury's, Habitat, Westfield, Liberty and The Body Shop.

Portas is claimed to be one of the UK's foremost authorities on retail and brand communication. She regularly travels around the world advising on retail strategy and frequently lectures on the theme of brands and retail. Notably, Portas spoke alongside Neil Armstrong at the Cannes Palais Festivals in October 2007, and spoke at the Yorkshire International Business Convention with the Dalai Lama in June 2012.

On 19 June 2009, in a ceremony at Galashiels, Heriot-Watt University awarded Portas a Doctorate of Letters in recognition of her career and her contribution to the advancement of marketing and brand communications within the retail sector

In December 2009, Portas opened her first permanent 'Living & Giving Shop' in support of charity Save the Children. As of 2025 there were over 21 shops open, mostly across London. She was also named as the charity's Global Retail Ambassador. By 2019, the charity shops have raised in excess of £23m for Save The Children. Portas has been credited with revolutionising the charity shop store format, making "Mary's Living & Giving" a destination for second hand and pre-loved clothing and separating it from the rest of the category - "Charity shops with a difference".

In August 2011, Portas opened her own shop, called "Mary & House of Fraser" within UK department store House of Fraser's Oxford Street flagship. The store stocks her first fashion collection, called 'Mary Portas', as well as other product collaborations including a footwear collection with Clark's. The range was discontinued in 2015.

=== Television ===
Portas's first television appearance was as a guest on Richard & Judy in 2005, where she was spotted by television producer Patricia Llewellyn who then signed Portas to production company Optomen Television.

Portas began her television career in 2007 with Mary Queen of Shops on BBC Two a series where she helped revive failing independent boutiques and high street retailers by revamping their branding, customer service, and layout. The show established her as a tough, no-nonsense retail expert with a flair for visual merchandising and blunt advice.

She followed up with Mary Queen of Charity Shops in 2009, where she tackled the image and profitability of charity shops, aiming to make them more commercially viable without losing their core mission. Her practical interventions drew both praise and criticism but brought new attention to the potential of charity retail.

In 2011, she moved to Channel 4 and hosted Mary Portas: Secret Shopper where she took on the issue of poor customer service in the UK, going undercover to expose bad practices and advocate for better treatment of consumers. She also helped retail staff reconnect with their roles and emphasized the value of meaningful service. The show ran for three series until 2016.

Also in 2011 a three part show called Mary Queen of Frocks was broadcast, This documentary-style series followed Portas as she launched her own fashion brand — "Mary & House of Fraser" — aimed at women over 40, a demographic she believed was being ignored by mainstream fashion. The series gave a behind-the-scenes look at the development of the Mary Portas fashion line, from concept to launch, as well as the obstacles she faced navigating corporate partnerships.

In 2012, Mary’s Bottom Line showed Portas tackle the decline of British manufacturing. Her mission was to revive UK-based underwear production by reopening a former textile factory and employing long-term unemployed young people to make "Kinky Knickers", a proudly British-made lingerie line. The show highlighted issues around outsourcing, lost skills, youth unemployment, and national identity in commerce.

2014 brought Mary: Queen of the High Street a follow-up to the Portas Review (her government-commissioned 2011 report into the decline of British high streets), this show brought her proposals to life. Each episode focused on a different struggling UK town, such as Margate or Liskeard, where she tried to revitalize the high street by working with local councils, business owners, and residents. The show revealed the complexity of local economies, bureaucracy, and resistance to change — and it also exposed the limitations of top-down retail interventions.

What Britain Bought This two-part documentary (broadcast annually) analyzed consumer data to review the top trends in British shopping each year. Portas used retail statistics as a lens to explore cultural shifts, such as: the rise of ethical and wellness-focused purchases, the influence of celebrity brands and the digital transformation of shopping.

==== Other television appearances ====
Portas presented an episode of The Money Programme called Mary Portas: Save Our Shops in 2009.

She appeared in the Panorama documentary "On the Rack" which exposed unethical production practices by fast fashion retailer Primark; and has appeared as a panellist on The Apprentice: You're Fired! four times.

In March 2011, Portas regularly appeared in the Channel 4 series Lily Allen: From Riches to Rags, in which she advised the pop star on her venture into fashion retail.

In October 2018, she appeared on series 12, episode 2 of Would I Lie To You.

=== Books ===
Portas' first book, Windows – the Art of Retail Display, was published in five languages by Thames & Hudson.

Her second book, How to Shop with Mary, Queen of Shops, was published by BBC Books in 2007 to accompany the television series. The book was co-authored by Peter Cross, Josh Sims and Melanie Rickey.

Her third book, Mary Portas, Shop Girl, a memoir, was published by Doubleday in 2015.

Her fourth book, Work Like A Woman, was published in 2019 by Penguin.

Her fifth book, Rebuild, was published in July 2021.

=== Journalism ===
Since 2005, Portas has written a weekly column Shop!, for the Daily Telegraph magazine, reviewing shops across the country. She started writing the column in 2005 and it was her critiquing of shops that was the inspiration for the BBC documentary and accompanying book. Each week, Portas reviews shops based on their location, shopability, service and website - awarding retailers marks out of 10.

Between 2008 and 2010, Portas wrote a weekly column for consumer fashion magazine Grazia, offering career advice and mentoring.

=== Mary's Living and Giving Shops ===
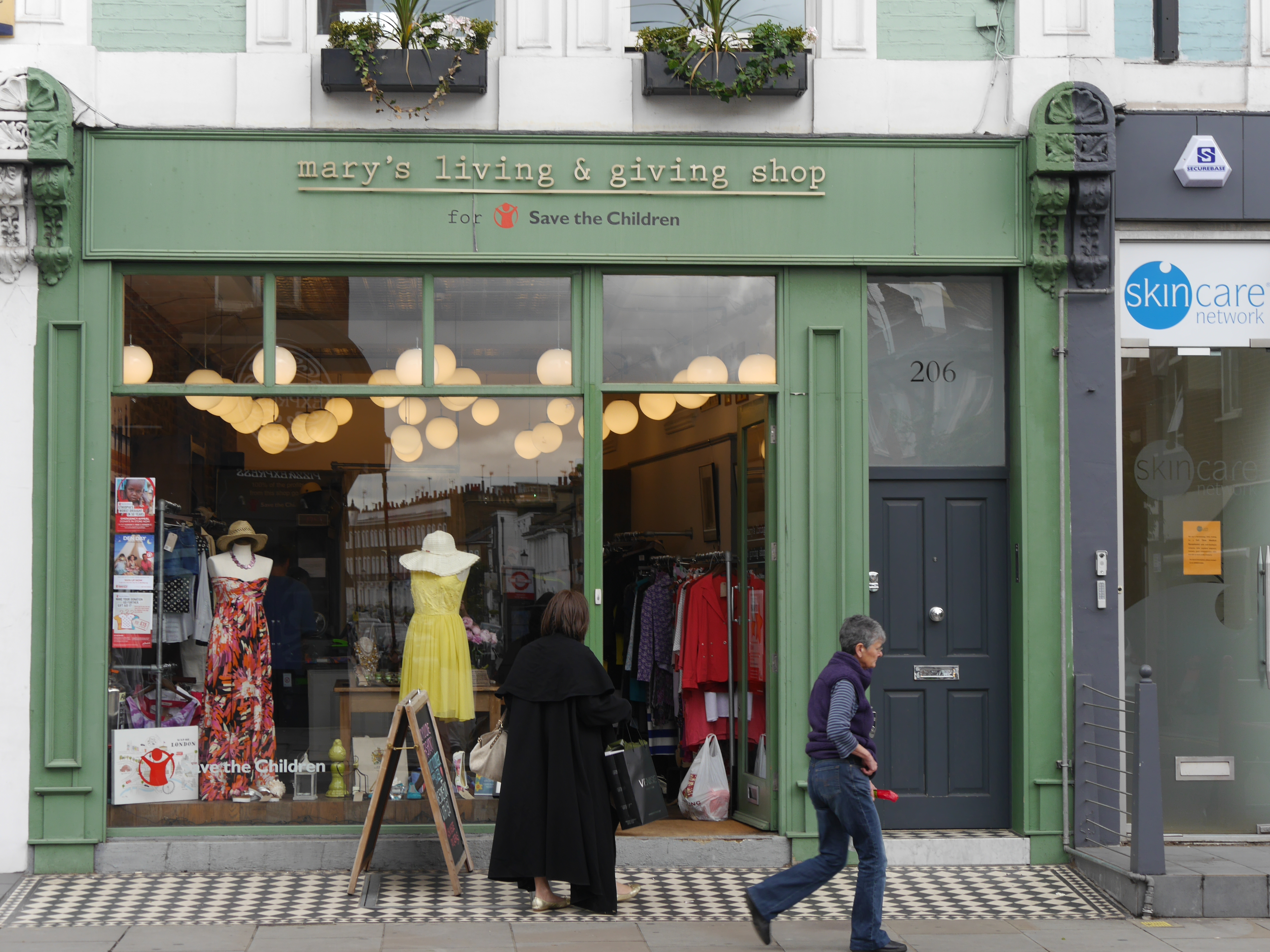
Mary's Living and Giving Shop, Fulham Road, Chelsea, London

Following the BBC Two series Mary, Queen of Charity Shops in June 2009, Portas was appointed as Global Retail Ambassador for Save the Children. She developed the "Living & Giving" concept as a new type of charity shop that puts the local community at its heart – "not just a shop, but a place to inspire, share, create, meet and discover". The first Living & Giving shop Portas opened was a three-week-long pop up at Westfield London, earning the charity over £190,000. Portas has gone on to open seven permanent Living & Giving shops, in Edinburgh, Westbourne Grove, Primrose Hill, Parson's Green, Barnes, New Kings Road, Richmond, Ealing and Chiswick.

=== Retail venture ===
In August 2011, she opened her first retail shop as a concession in House of Fraser's Oxford Street branch. The shop, named Mary & House of Fraser, sells clothing and lifestyle products aimed at the 40+ female market, and was filmed for a Channel 4 documentary Mary Queen of Frocks that aired in October 2011.

=== Portas Pilot towns ===
In May 2011, she was appointed by the Prime Minister David Cameron and Deputy Prime Minister Nick Clegg to lead an independent review into the future of the high street. She published her report "The Portas Review" on 13 December 2011. Portas said that the aim of her review was to "put the heart back into the centre of our High Streets, re-imagined as destinations for socialising, culture, health, wellbeing, creativity and learning". The review made 28 detailed recommendations. On 13 December 2011 Prime Minister David Cameron thanked Portas for her review and said that the Government would respond to her recommendations in spring 2012. Cameron said "I am delighted that Mary Portas has produced such a clear vision of how we can create vibrant and diverse town centres and breathe life back into our high streets."

On 4 February 2012, the minister for local government, Grant Shapps, announced that towns across England could bid to become Portas Pilot Areas. A total of twelve towns were to receive a share of £1m, as well as the support of the Minister, Whitehall and Mary Portas. In May 2012, the twelve towns to be helped were announced as Bedford, Croydon, Dartford, Bedminster (Greater Bristol), Liskeard, Margate, Market Rasen, Nelson, Newbiggin-by-the-Sea, Stockport, Stockton-on-Tees and Wolverhampton.

In July 2012, fifteen more towns were announced: Ashford, Berwick, Braintree, Brighton (London Road), Hatfield, Royal Leamington Spa (Old town), Liverpool (Lodge Lane), Waterloo, Forest Hill, Tower Hamlets (Chrisp Street, Watney Market and Roman Road), Loughborough, Lowestoft, Morecambe, Rotherham and Tiverton.

A 2017 retrospective article in The Telegraph showed Portas' plan failed to stem the number of High Street store closures; Portas said that it had only been a government public relations exercise as her recommendations had been ignored.

== Filmography ==
Year	Title	Role	Notes
2007–2010	Mary, Queen of Shops	Presenter	3 series
2009	Mary, Queen of Charity Shops	Presenter	1 series
2011	Mary, Queen of Frocks	Presenter	1 series
2011–2016	Mary Portas: Secret Shopper	Presenter	3 series
2012	Hotel GB	Co-general manager	1 series
2012	Mary's Bottom Line	Presenter	1 series
2013	Mary, Queen of the High Street	Presenter	1 series
2014	Mary Portas, Silver Service	Presenter	1 series
2016	What Britain Buys	Presenter	1 series

== Personal life ==
Portas married chemical engineer and Unilever executive Graham Portas in 1990; they had two children, Mylo and Verity. After divorcing her husband in 2003, Portas met fashion journalist Melanie Rickey and came out as a lesbian the same year; they lived in Primrose Hill with her children and their son Horatio, who was carried by Rickey and born in 2012 via IVF after a sperm donation from Portas' brother.

Portas and Rickey entered a civil partnership in 2010.. On 29 March 2014, Portas attended the "I Do To Equal Marriage" event, which celebrated the introduction of same-sex marriage in England and Wales. At one minute past midnight on 10 December 2014, Portas and Rickey became one of the first couples in the UK to convert their civil partnership to a marriage, following a parliamentary change to the Marriage Act. The pair announced their separation on 17 May 2019. Portas started a new relationship in 2022 and prefers to keep the details private.

She spends her money on art, wine, theatre and chocolate, and enjoys gardening. She was named as one of the top 100 Tweeters in the UK by The Independent in 2011.

Portas' best friend is Katharine McMahon.

Portas was appointed Officer of the Order of the British Empire (OBE) in the 2024 New Year Honours for services to business, broadcasting and charity.
