= Kitchen Nightmares =

American reality television series

- Genre: Reality television
- Based on: Ramsay's Kitchen Nightmares
- Developed by: Daniel Kay
- Directed by: Brad Kreisberg (season 1–season 3 episode 7); Mark Jacobs (season 3 episodes 1–6, 8–13); Jay Hunter (seasons 4–6); Glenn Taylor (season 7); Paul Newton (seasons 8–present)
- Starring: Gordon Ramsay
- Narrated by: J.V. Martin; Arthur Smith; Gordon Kennedy
- Opening theme: "Misirlou"
- Composer: David Vanacore
- Country of origin: United States
- Original language: English
- No. of seasons: 10
- No. of episodes: 125

Production
- Executive producers: Katy Dierks; Arthur Smith; Patricia Llewellyn; Kent Weed; Gerry McKean; Curt Northrup; Gordon Ramsay
- Running time: 58 minutes
- Production companies: A. Smith & Co. Productions (original series); Optomen (original series); Granada America (2007–2010); ITV Studios America (2011–2014); Fox Alternative Entertainment (revival); Studio Ramsay Global (revival); All3Media International (revival)

Original release
- Network: Fox
- Release: September 19, 2007 – September 12, 2014
- Release: September 25, 2023 – present

Kitchen Nightmares, also known in the UK as Ramsay's Kitchen Nightmares USA, is an American reality television series originally broadcast on Fox, in which chef Gordon Ramsay is invited by the owners to spend a week with a failing restaurant in an attempt to revive the business. Produced by ITV Studios America, it is based on the British show Ramsay's Kitchen Nightmares.

The show originally premiered September 19, 2007, on Fox. On June 23, 2014, Ramsay announced that he was ending the series; the final episode aired on September 12 that year. In June 2018, Gordon Ramsay's 24 Hours to Hell and Back, a series similar to Kitchen Nightmares albeit with a shorter timeline, premiered on Fox. In May 2023, Fox announced that the show would re-enter production for an eighth season, which premiered on September 25, 2023. The show's ninth season began airing on January 7, 2025. On May 11, 2026, the show was renewed for a tenth season, which premiered on July 21, 2026.

== Synopsis ==
Each episode begins with clips and interviews introducing the episode's restaurant, emphasizing the subpar conditions. Ramsay observes a lunch and dinner service, which is often overwhelmingly negative. Ramsay inspects the back-of-house, often uncovering further problems.

The next day, Ramsay meets with owners and staff to discuss what changes need to be made (e.g., menu changes, retraining, remodelling). The restaurant relaunches, typically with more successful service, and Ramsay addresses the restaurant's owner and staff one final time before leaving, wishing them well.

In later seasons, episodes end with a follow-up segment showcasing the restaurant's status in the months after Ramsay's visit. Each season after season one, an episode is dedicated to Ramsay revisiting some of the previous restaurants he visited to see what became of the restaurant and its staff.

== Production ==
The original run of the show was produced by ITV Studios America (Note: The company was formerly Granada America and was rebranded in 2011.) and Optomen, in association with A. Smith & Co. Productions, with Arthur Smith, Kent Weed, and Patricia Llewellyn serving as executive producers.

In the UK, the series is broadcast under the name Kitchen Nightmares USA and Ramsay's Kitchen Nightmares USA on Channel 4, which also produced the original British version. It is broadcast under this name to avoid confusion with the original British version. British airings of the American show feature an alternate soundtrack and mix, with less prominent musical stings, wild music, a lower level of vocal compression, and a different narrator to the American broadcast. It also airs uncensored, when shown after the watershed. Reruns, along with the British series, are frequently shown on BBC America.

On May 15, 2023, Fox announced that it would revive the series, with production being assumed by Studio Ramsay Global in association with Fox Alternative Entertainment. Ramsay and his crew were spotted at several restaurants in the New York metropolitan area through the spring and summer of 2023. Some locations include a restaurant in Wayne, a pizzeria in Dumont, a bar and grill in Asbury Park, and a cafe in Saugerties.

Season 8 premiered on September 25, 2023.

In November 2024, Fox announced a ninth season premiering on January 7, 2025; the season featured restaurants in the Austin, Houston, and New Orleans areas. The first half of the season served as a cross-promotion for Fox's broadcast of Super Bowl LIX from New Orleans, and featured local restaurants and guest appearances by National Football League players and personalities.

== Episodes ==
=== Series overview ===
Season	Episodes	Originally released	
Season	Episodes	First released	Last released
1	10	September 19, 2007	December 12, 2007
2	12	September 4, 2008	January 15, 2009
3	13	January 29, 2010	May 21, 2010
4	14	January 21, 2011	May 20, 2011
5	17	September 23, 2011	March 30, 2012
6	16	October 26, 2012	May 10, 2013
7	10	April 11, 2014	September 12, 2014
8	10	September 25, 2023	December 4, 2023
9	11	January 7, 2025	March 18, 2025
10	12	July 21, 2026	September 15, 2026

=== Season 1 (2007) ===
No. overall	No. in season	Restaurant	Location	Original release date	Prod. code	U.S. viewers (millions)
1	1	"Peter's"	Babylon, New York	September 19, 2007	108	6.61
Gordon travels to Babylon, New York, to help a family-owned Italian restaurant with no communication, subpar food, and an arrogant owner who spends more money on his extravagant lifestyle than supporting the business.
2	2	"Dillon's"	New York City, New York	September 26, 2007	110	5.42
Gordon travels to New York City to help a struggling Indian restaurant correct their substandard food, bad management practices, and poor state of the kitchen and food storage. Note: the restaurant was renamed Purnima during production.
3	3	"The Mixing Bowl"	Bellmore, New York	October 3, 2007	105	6.22
Gordon travels to Bellmore, New York, to help an American bistro revamp their dated food, mend a broken relationship between the husband and wife owners, and stand out among other new eateries in the local area.
4	4	"Seascape"	Islip, New York	October 10, 2007	106	6.37
Gordon travels to Islip, New York, to help breathe life back into a 45-year-old seafood restaurant with a clueless owner at the helm, a lazy chef, and decor that is stuck in the past.
5	5	"The Olde Stone Mill"	Tuckahoe, New York	October 17, 2007	109	6.87
Gordon travels to Tuckahoe, New York, to try to save the Olde Stone Mill, an eatery with dated food, a defiant owner with no experience in the restaurant industry, and a kitchen staff who have lost their passion.
6	6	"Sebastian's"	Toluca Lake, California	November 7, 2007	103	6.36
Gordon travels to Los Angeles to try to save Sebastian's, a pizzeria with an owner who thinks his confusing restaurant concept is pleasing the locals, when it is actually turning them away.
7	7	"Finn McCool's"	Westhampton, New York	November 14, 2007	104	6.95
Gordon travels to Westhampton, New York, to help save Finn McCool's, an Irish pub with surprisingly little Irish fare on the menu, a chef with hardly any experience, and a family that could lose everything if the business fails.
8	8	"Lela's"	Pomona, California	November 21, 2007	102	5.35
Gordon travels to Pomona, California, to help save an upscale-looking restaurant with low-quality food. He must guide the staff and kitchen team to get back on track before the owner is forced to close its doors.
9	9	"Campania"	Fair Lawn, New Jersey	November 28, 2007	107	7.03
Gordon heads to Fair Lawn, New Jersey, to help Campania, an Italian restaurant where the staff treats the business like it is a frat house, joking around and drinking on the job, while the kitchen serves up one bad dish after another. Gordon has to act quickly before the owner's attitude and staff behavior force the restaurant to shut down entirely.
10	10	"The Secret Garden"	Moorpark, California	December 12, 2007	101	6.10
Gordon travels to Moorpark, California, where he meets an arrogant and deluded chef who thinks everything he does is perfect. Ramsay tries the subpar food and finds moldy produce in the walk-in cooler before trying to save the fancy French restaurant that is on its last legs.

=== Season 2 (2008–09) ===
No. overall	No. in season	Restaurant	Location	Original release date	Prod. code	U.S. viewers (millions)
11	1	"Revisited: Gordon Returns"	N/A	September 4, 2008	123–124	5.28
Gordon revisits Finn McCool's, The Olde Stone Mill, The Mixing Bowl, Dillon's, Campania, and Peter's to see how their restaurants are faring after his first visits to their businesses.
12	2	"Handlebar"	Mount Sinai, New York	September 11, 2008	111	6.18
Gordon visits Mount Sinai, New York, to help Handlebar, a dive bar and restaurant that is suffering from cliched, bland food, owners with no restaurant experience, and a chef who needs motivation to show up and cook.
13	3	"Giuseppi's"	Macomb Township, Michigan	September 18, 2008	119	6.15
Gordon travels to Macomb Township, Michigan, to help an Italian eatery whose bland food has turned away the locals. The atmosphere in the kitchen is chaotic, and managed by a chef who has no clue what he is doing. Gordon has to implement changes swiftly before the owners and staff dig a hole of which their business cannot get out.
14	4	"Trobiano's"	Great Neck, New York	September 25, 2008	112	4.19
Gordon travels to Great Neck, New York, to help Trobiano's, an Italian restaurant that has been hindered by its boring menu, drab decor and a surplus of seniors, who take advantage of the restaurant's specials, which have ended up losing them money.
15	5	"Black Pearl"	New York City, New York	September 25, 2008	116	4.46
Gordon travels to New York City and meets three owners struggling to keep their seafood restaurant afloat. After tasting subpar food and battling with David, an owner in denial, he has his work cut out for him, to save an eatery located in one of the most competitive restaurant cities in the country.
16	6	"J Willy's"	South Bend, Indiana	October 30, 2008	117	3.91
Gordon travels to South Bend, Indiana, to help breathe life back into an American-style restaurant J Willy's, where the standards have hit rock bottom. He is forced to battle with the owners and show them the way to properly run a kitchen after tasting disgusting food and seeing restaurant practices that make him question the passion the staff brings to the table.
17	7	"Hannah & Mason's"	Cranbury, New Jersey	November 6, 2008	114	4.43
Gordon travels to Cranbury, New Jersey, where he finds a depressing American bistro and two chefs with no passion. After trying the disappointing food, he holds nothing back to reignite the spark in both the chefs and the restaurant as a whole.
18	8	"Jack's Waterfront"	St. Clair Shores, Michigan	November 6, 2008	120	4.70
Gordon travels to St. Clair Shores, Michigan, to help restore a lakeside seafood restaurant with a dysfunctional slew of owners and management. After trying frozen seafood despite being on the river, watching a manager drink and party with the guests, though he was on the job, and discovering the unsafe storage of food, Gordon has to act quickly before it is too late.
19	9	"Sabatiello's"	Stamford, Connecticut	November 13, 2008	115	4.59
Gordon travels to Stamford, Connecticut, where he finds an arrogant, pompous owner running a subpar Italian restaurant using day-old, frozen ingredients. Gordon must change the food and get through to the stubborn owner quickly before he drags his restaurant past the point of no return.
20	10	"Fiesta Sunrise"	West Nyack, New York	November 13, 2008	113	4.91
Gordon heads to West Nyack, New York, to help save a Mexican restaurant with a confused manager at the helm. His stepdaughter and wife have invested heavily in the business, and if Gordon cannot turn the business around, they both will lose everything.
21	11	"Santé La Brea"	Los Angeles, California	November 20, 2008	122	4.69
Gordon travels to Los Angeles to help save a health-food restaurant that suffers from a micromanaging owner, underwhelming, stale food, and a cluttered dining room. Gordon has to get through to the owner quickly before his compulsive behavior forces his business to shut down.
22	12	"Cafe 36"	La Grange, Illinois	January 15, 2009	118	4.36
Gordon heads to La Grange, Illinois, to help save an upscale bistro from shutting for good. Gordon comes face-to-face with confusing, subpar dishes, an old-fashioned dining area, and a head chef who is not concerned with the restaurant's success or the quality of the meals he is serving.

=== Season 3 (2010) ===
The third-season premiere was scheduled to air on Wednesday, January 27, 2010, but was postponed to Friday, January 29, due to the State of the Union address.

No. overall	No. in season	Restaurant	Location	Original release date	Prod. code	U.S. viewers (millions)
23	1	"Hot Potato Cafe"	Fishtown, Pennsylvania	January 29, 2010	205	3.28
Gordon heads to Fishtown area of Philadelphia to help a potato-themed restaurant after a scathing food critic review turned customers away and gave their business a bad reputation in the community. Gordon helps mix the menu and gives the dining rooms several updates.
24	2	"Flamangos"	Whitehouse Station, New Jersey	February 2, 2010	204	9.00
Gordon travels to Whitehouse Station, New Jersey, to help save a Hawaiian-themed restaurant that has an elderly owner tired out. The food is repulsive, the decor is ugly, and the female owner is in complete denial and resistant to change. Note: The restaurant was renamed The Junction during production.
25	3	"Bazzini"	Ridgewood, New Jersey	February 5, 2010	203	4.13
Gordon travels to Ridgewood, New Jersey, to help breathe life back into an American-Italian bistro. The chef owner has lost passion, the food is mediocre, and the restaurant is closed for lunch, meaning revenue is being missed.
26	4	"Mojito"	Brooklyn, New York	February 25, 2010	201	7.43
Gordon travels to Brooklyn to help a Cuban restaurant get back on its feet. The owners, who were formerly married, are constantly feuding, the food is disgusting, and they have created a bad reputation in the community.
27	5	"Lido di Manhattan"	Manhattan Beach, California	March 4, 2010	208	7.89
Gordon travels to Manhattan Beach, California, an upscale eatery that has a young owner at the helm. The food is overpriced and not up to par, the kitchen is filthy, and the owner does not take responsibility for her business and the mistakes her staff and she are making.
28	6	"Le Bistro"	Lighthouse Point, Florida	March 11, 2010	209	7.19
Gordon travels to Lighthouse Point, Florida, to help restore a bistro on its last legs. The chef is arrogant and rude to staff and customers, the food is overpriced for the area, and they have turned away locals due to the long waits for food and the animosity between the owner and the patrons.
29	7	"Casa Roma"	Lancaster, California	March 12, 2010	121	4.08
Gordon visits Lancaster, California, to help a bar and Italian restaurant regain its former glory. The chef is lazy and in complete denial, the food is disgusting and takes too long to arrive, and the dining room and kitchen are a complete mess. Note: This episode was produced as part of season two, but not aired until season three.
30	8	"Mama Rita's"	Newbury Park, California	March 19, 2010	206	4.38
Gordon travels to Newbury Park, California, to help a Mexican restaurant with an owner who thinks a catering business is the same as running a dine-in restaurant. The kitchen staff is not experienced with cooking fresh food, the freezers are jam-packed with frozen products, and the manager does not know what is wrong with the business, though it is crystal clear to Gordon.
31	9	"Anna Vincenzo's"	Boca Raton, Florida	March 26, 2010	210	4.29
Gordon heads to Boca Raton, Florida, to help save an Italian restaurant with one of the most defensive, rude owners yet. The menu is huge and the quality and consistency are not up to par, the staff is fed up with being berated by the kitchen staff, and customers are turned off by the owner's malicious personality.
32	10	"Revisited No. 2"	N/A	April 9, 2010	213	3.57
Gordon revisits Santé La Brea and Giuseppi's to see how their restaurants are faring after his first visits to their businesses.
33	11	"Fleming"	Miami, Florida	May 7, 2010	211	3.47
Gordon visits Miami, Florida, to help save a Danish restaurant. The chef is lazy and has lost his passion for cooking Danish cuisine, the food is old-fashioned and bland, and the dining room is painted a hideous shade of pink. Gordon has to think fast or this long-running restaurant might have to shut its doors for the last time.
34	12	"Sushi-Ko"	Thousand Oaks, California	May 14, 2010	207	3.61
Gordon heads to Thousand Oaks, California, to help a failing sushi restaurant. The business is losing money and the husband-and-wife owners are on the brink of divorce, with their daughter caught in the middle. Gordon needs to work quickly to help correct the food, decor, and worker dynamics before the restaurant rips this family apart.
35	13	"Revisited No. 3"	N/A	May 21, 2010	212	3.41
Gordon revisits Handlebar, Casa Roma, and Black Pearl to see how their restaurants are faring after his first visits to their businesses.

=== Season 4 (2011) ===
In May 2010, the Fox network announced the return of Kitchen Nightmares for a fourth season, which aired from January 21, 2011, to May 20, 2011.

No. overall	No. in season	Restaurant	Location	Original release date	Prod. code	U.S. viewers (millions)
36	1	"Spanish Pavilion"	Harrison, New Jersey	January 21, 2011	301	4.27
Gordon visits a Spanish restaurant that is struggling since the founder retired. His daughter and two grandsons are now running the restaurant, but one brother is a busy member of the town council, while the other has given up in the kitchen.
37	2	"Classic American"	West Babylon, New York	January 28, 2011	302	4.08
Gordon helps two ex-waitresses who bought out their restaurant and are struggling to keep standards up.
38	3	"PJ's Steakhouse"	Queens, New York	February 4, 2011	202	4.04
Gordon travels to Queens, New York to visit PJ's Steakhouse, a restaurant he quickly discovers is all sizzle and no steak. Note: The restaurant was renamed PJ's Grill during production.
39	4	"Revisited No. 4"	N/A	February 11, 2011	312	3.74
Revisit to Mojito, The Junction (formerly Flamangos), and Bazzini.
40	5	"Grasshopper Also"	Carlstadt, New Jersey	February 18, 2011	303	3.97
Gordon visits an Irish restaurant where the kitchen can not make shepherd's pie, and the manager is on the verge of breakdown from his father-in-law's constant criticism.
41	6	"Davide"	Boston, Massachusetts	February 25, 2011	304	3.69
Gordon visits an Italian restaurant with misleading claims of home-made cooking. One of the owners has a history of opiate addiction, and has stolen from the business to pay for drugs.
42	7	"Down City"	Providence, Rhode Island	March 11, 2011	305	4.05
Gordon visits a comfort food restaurant with terrible food and a co-owner in denial. Over the course of the episode, she learns to accept criticism and listen to her staff.
43	8	"Revisited No. 5"	N/A	March 18, 2011	313	3.74
Revisit to Le Bistro, Anna Vincenzo's and Lido di Manhattan.
44	9	"Tavolini"	Bridgeport, Connecticut	March 25, 2011	306	3.98
Gordon visits a restaurant with absent owners whose kids are more passionate about the success of the restaurant than their parents.
45	10	"Kingston Cafe"	Pasadena, California	April 15, 2011	309	3.91
Gordon visits a Jamaican restaurant run by headstrong radiologist and ex-Olympian Una Morris.
46	11	"La Frite"	Sherman Oaks, California	April 29, 2011	307	3.37
Gordon visits a family restaurant in which the brother-sister siblings have resentment between them, and with a head chef resistant to criticism.
47	12	"Capri"	Eagle Rock, California	May 6, 2011	308	3.71
Gordon visits an Italian restaurant run by two immature twin brothers. Despite deteriorating furniture, a filthy restaurant, and unappetizing food, he is able to inspire the brothers into raising their standards.
48	13	"Zeke's"	Metairie, Louisiana	May 13, 2011	310	3.16
Gordon visits a former Metairie staple, once run by the community-beloved Zeke. The new owners are more concerned with finances than good food, and are resistant to their staff's suggestions for improvement.
49	14	"Oceana"	New Orleans, Louisiana	May 20, 2011	311	3.86
Gordon visits a New Orleans restaurant run by two brothers. Despite initially butting heads with Ramsay, they come to realize the problems in their kitchen, including a rat infestation, that he brought up are valid.

=== Season 5 (2011–12) ===
In March 2011, the producers of the show announced a casting call for a fifth season. The fifth season premiered on Friday, September 23, 2011, and ended on March 30, 2012.

No. overall	No. in season	Restaurant	Location	Original release date	Prod. code	U.S. viewers (millions)
50	1	"Blackberry's"	Plainfield, New Jersey	September 23, 2011	401	3.90
Ramsay visits a soul food restaurant in New Jersey. The owner, Sherry, was a successful caterer before opening her own restaurant with the financial help of her mother Mary. Sherry proves resistant to Ramsay's changes, though Mary and other employees embrace them. The recap shows that Sherry eventually acquiesced to them once she saw how successful the restaurant was.
51	2	"Leone's"	Montclair, New Jersey	September 30, 2011	402	4.01
Gordon visits an Italian restaurant which has fallen into mismanagement after the owner's son took over following an unusual medical emergency.
52	3	"Mike & Nellie's"	Oakhurst, New Jersey	October 7, 2011	403	3.08
Gordon visits a family restaurant which has declined in quality and popularity since the death of the family's grandfather, Nellie. Gordon convinces owner Mike to delegate responsibility to his staff, for the sake of himself, his family and the restaurant.
53	4	"Luigi's D'Italia"	Anaheim, California	October 14, 2011	405	3.63
Gordon visits an Italian restaurant that was run by a father-son duo from 1981 to 2006. Now, Luigi's is on the verge of bankruptcy since the father retired to Italy, and an unconcerned brother takes his place. The arrogant chef-owner's wife also has a history of yelling and swearing at both staff and customers.
54	5	"Revisited No. 6"	N/A	October 21, 2011	411	3.46
Revisit to Down City, Classic American and Davide.
55	6	"Burger Kitchen, Part 1"	Los Angeles, California	November 4, 2011	406	3.71
Gordon visits Burger Kitchen in Los Angeles, run by a stubborn owner and his wife, who claim there is a Yelp conspiracy against them. They also claim to sell 5 star burgers, which are frozen and tasteless. Additionally, they cannot hold onto a chef and the current chef claims he is forced to make the owner's recipes and does not get paid, which Gordon quickly discovers to be true. Furthermore, the owner and his son were each to receive a large inheritance from the owner's father (the infamous Australian organized crime figure Abe Saffron), only for the owner to take his son's inheritance to pay for the restaurant without his knowledge or consent, forcing him into the business and causing him and his fiancée to harbor deep resentment against his parents. Gordon must make drastic changes in order to save this restaurant and the family relationship before it's too late.
56	7	"Burger Kitchen, Part 2"	Los Angeles, California	November 11, 2011	407	3.94
Part 2 of the previous episode. Gordon gets through to the owners about the Yelp conspiracy, and their treatment of their son, his fiancée and their staff, easing the tension between them. However, the chef is no longer employed after an altercation with the son, and the owners struggle in letting their son take the reins, but ultimately allow him the time and space. Gordon then gives the restaurant and menu a significant make over to everyone's delight and service goes very well.
57	8	"The Greek at the Harbor"	Ventura, California	November 18, 2011	404	3.46
58	9	"Michon's"	College Park, Georgia	January 13, 2012	409	3.78
59	10	"El Greco"	Austin, Texas	January 20, 2012	408	3.86
60	11	"Revisited No. 7"	N/A	January 27, 2012	412	3.42
Revisit to Spanish Pavilion, Kingston Cafe, Capri, and La Frite
61	12	"Park's Edge"	Atlanta, Georgia	February 3, 2012	410	3.83
62	13	"Spin-A-Yarn Steakhouse"	Fremont, California	February 10, 2012	413	3.56
63	14	"Charlie's"	La Verne, California	February 17, 2012	414	3.05
64	15	"Cafe Hon"	Baltimore, Maryland	February 24, 2012	415	3.47
65	16	"Chiarella's"	Philadelphia, Pennsylvania	March 23, 2012	416	3.06
66	17	"Zocalo"	Philadelphia, Pennsylvania	March 30, 2012	417	2.93

=== Season 6 (2012–13) ===
In February 2012, Fox announced it had renewed Kitchen Nightmares for a sixth season, which premiered on Friday, October 26, 2012.

No. overall	No. in season	Restaurant	Location	Original release date	Prod. code	U.S. viewers (millions)
67	1	"La Galleria 33, Part 1"	Boston, Massachusetts	October 26, 2012	502	2.65
68	2	"La Galleria 33, Part 2"	Boston, Massachusetts	November 2, 2012	503	2.85
69	3	"Mama Maria's"	Brooklyn, New York	November 9, 2012	508	3.45
70	4	"Ms. Jean's Southern Cuisine"	Wilkinsburg, Pennsylvania	November 16, 2012	504	3.38
71	5	"Barefoot Bob's"	Hull, Massachusetts	December 7, 2012	501	3.04
72	6	"Revisited No. 8"	N/A	December 14, 2012	512	2.99
Revisit to Cafe Hon, Chiarella's, and Leone's
73	7	"Olde Hitching Post Restaurant and Tavern"	Hanson, Massachusetts	January 25, 2013	509	3.75
74	8	"Levanti's Italian Restaurant"	Beaver, Pennsylvania	February 1, 2013	505	2.89
The restaurant was renamed Levanti's American Bistro during production.
75	9	"Sam's Mediterranean Kabob Room"	Monrovia, California	February 15, 2013	511	3.14
76	10	"Nino's Italian Restaurant"	Long Beach, California	February 22, 2013	510	3.08
77	11	"Mill Street Bistro, Part 1"	Norwalk, Ohio	March 1, 2013	506	3.30
In Norwalk, Ohio, Gordon meets the arrogant owner of Mill Street Bistro on his farm. He claims he trained with "old school Europeans" and the animals on his farm supply his restaurant, only to discover later this is not the case. He charges too much money for unappetizing food, including catch of the day that is days old, and elk quesadilla. A freezer inspection shows food that should never be frozen. When Gordon confronts the owner, he remains arrogant and in denial, hollering back and even mocking Gordon. He must get through to the owner and help make major changes or else the restaurant is history.
78	12	"Mill Street Bistro, Part 2"	Norwalk, Ohio	March 8, 2013	507	3.31
Part two. The staff go in depth about the problems at the restaurant not knowing the owner is listening in. He takes the criticism well to their surprise and promises to change. However, during dinner service he slips into his old ways, resulting in a massive blow up where Gordon ejects him from the kitchen. After Gordon transforms the restaurant, the owner finally adheres to Gordon's advice and listens to his staff.
79	13	"Yanni's"	Seattle, Washington	March 15, 2013	513	3.03
80	14	"Prohibition Grille"	Everett, Washington	April 26, 2013	514	3.02
Restaurant was renamed Prohibition Gastropub during production.
81	15	"Chappy's"	Nashville, Tennessee	May 3, 2013	516	3.05
82	16	"Amy's Baking Company"	Scottsdale, Arizona	May 10, 2013	515	3.34
Due to the level of conflict with the restaurant owners, Ramsay leaves the restaurant without finishing, the first and only instance of this in the show's history.

=== Season 7 (2014) ===
Season 7 was originally set to premiere on February 28, 2014, but was delayed until April 11, 2014.

No. overall	No. in season	Restaurant	Location	Original release date	Prod. code	U.S. viewers (millions)
83	1	"Return to Amy's Baking Company"	Scottsdale, Arizona	April 11, 2014	610	3.07
Ramsay himself does not return to Amy's Baking Company (instead presenting the episode from the set of Hell's Kitchen), though a new, specially recorded interview with the owners is conducted by local reporter Ana Garcia. The episode also features bonus footage that was not aired on the original episode.
84	2	"Pantaleone's"	Denver, Colorado	April 11, 2014	603	2.90
Chef Ramsay heads to Denver, CO, where he meets a restaurant owner who is truly stuck in the past. Pete claims his family owned-and-run restaurant makes the "Best Pizza in Denver" based on a review from the 1980s. But when Ramsay holds a local taste test and a store-bought pizza is preferred over Pete's, it is clear the Denver community disagrees with that claim.
85	3	"Old Neighborhood"	Arvada, Colorado	April 18, 2014	604	2.99
86	4	"Kati Allo"	Queens, New York	April 18, 2014	601	2.56
87	5	"Mangia Mangia, Part 1"	Woodland Park, Colorado	April 25, 2014	607	2.84
88	6	"Mangia Mangia, Part 2"	Woodland Park, Colorado	April 25, 2014	608	3.15
89	7	"Zayna Flaming Grill, Part 1"	Redondo Beach, California	May 2, 2014	605	2.43
90	8	"Zayna Flaming Grill, Part 2"	Redondo Beach, California	May 2, 2014	606	2.56
91	9	"Bella Luna"	Easton, Pennsylvania	May 16, 2014	602	2.42
92	10	"Revisited No. 9"	N/A	September 12, 2014	609	1.82
Revisit to La Galleria 33, Olde Hitching Post and Prohibition Gastropub.

=== Season 8 (2023) ===
In May 2023, Fox announced that it would revive the series after nine years. Season 8 premiered on September 25, 2023.

No. overall	No. in season	Restaurant	Location	Original release date	Prod. code	U.S. viewers (millions)
93	1	"Bel Aire"	Astoria, New York	September 25, 2023	KNI-102	1.58
94	2	"Bask 46"	Woodland Park, New Jersey	October 2, 2023	KNI-101	1.51
95	3	"In the Drink"	Wayne, New Jersey	October 9, 2023	KNI-104	1.60
96	4	"Da Mimmo"	Dumont, New Jersey	October 16, 2023	KNI-105	1.68
97	5	"The Juicy Box"	Brooklyn, New York	November 6, 2023	KNI-103	1.49
98	6	"Love Bites"	Saugerties, New York	November 13, 2023	KNI-108	1.59
99	7	"El Cantito"	Yonkers, New York	November 20, 2023	KNI-107	1.41
100	8	"South Brooklyn Foundry"	Brooklyn, New York	November 27, 2023	KNI-106	1.62
101	9	"Max's Bar & Grill"	Long Branch, New Jersey	December 4, 2023	KNI-110	1.33
102	10	"Diwan"	Port Washington, New York	December 4, 2023	KNI-109	1.33

=== Season 9 (2025): "Kitchen Nightmares: Road to Super Bowl LIX" ===
No. overall	No. in season	Restaurant	Location	Original release date	Prod. code	U.S. viewers (millions)
103	1	"Iberville: Ramsay's Worst Nightmare"	New Orleans, Louisiana	January 7, 2025	KNI-201	1.64
104	2	"Iberville: The Nightmare Continues"	New Orleans, Louisiana	January 14, 2025	KNI-202	1.77
105	3	"Voleos"	Westwego, Louisiana	January 21, 2025	KNI-204	1.93
106	4	"Kindred"	New Orleans, Louisiana	January 28, 2025	KNI-205	1.67
107	5	"3 Southern Girls"	Jefferson, Louisiana	February 4, 2025	KNI-207	1.78
108	6	"Kings Blu Jam"	Spring, Texas	February 11, 2025	KNI-208	1.69
109	7	"Verdict"	New Orleans, Louisiana	February 18, 2025	KNI-203	1.74
110	8	"Grumpy George"	Georgetown, Texas	February 25, 2025	KNI-209	1.74
111	9	"Leo's"	Cedar Creek, Texas	March 4, 2025	KNI-210	1.53
112	10	"Blake's Place"	New Orleans, Louisiana	March 11, 2025	KNI-206	1.66
113	11	"Simmer Down"	Georgetown, Texas	March 18, 2025	KNI-211	1.52

=== Season 10 (2026) ===
No. overall	No. in season	Restaurant	Location	Original release date	Prod. code	U.S. viewers (millions)
114	1	"Freddy's Steak House"	Hammond, Indiana	July 21, 2026	KNI-303	N/A
115	2	"4 Star Diner"	Cortland, Ohio	July 21, 2026	KNI-311	N/A
116	3	"Love on the Blu"	Blue Island, Illinois	July 28, 2026	KNI-302	N/A
117	4	"Borelli's Pizzeria"	Chicago, Illinois	August 4, 2026	KNI-301	N/A
118	5	"Renate's German Restaurant"	Hanover Park, Illinois	August 11, 2026	KNI-305	N/A
119	6	"Boodles Restaurant"	Madison Heights, Michigan	August 18, 2026	KNI-307	N/A
120	7	"Cafe Notte"	Pittsburgh, Pennsylvania	August 25, 2026	KNI-312	TBD
121	8	"Golden Girls"	Eastlake, Ohio	September 1, 2026	KNI-310	TBD
122	9	"Lyla's Family Restaurant, Part 1"	Cuyahoga Falls, Ohio	September 8, 2026	KNI-308	TBD
123	10	"Lyla's Family Restaurant, Part 2"	Cuyahoga Falls, Ohio	September 8, 2026	KNI-309	TBD
124	11	"Wick 'n Ore Kitchen & Tap"	Vernon Hills, Illinois	September 15, 2026	KNI-304	TBD
125	12	"Firenze Restaurant & Pizzeria"	Warren, Michigan	September 15, 2026	KNI-306	TBD

== Lawsuits ==
In September 2007, a case was filed by Martin Hyde, a former manager of Dillon's, against Ramsay for ten offenses, including allegedly staging disasters and hiring actors to trick the viewing audience. The case was dismissed because the contract signed by Hyde stipulated arbitration in the event of a legal dispute. The case went into arbitration in 2008.

In 2018, Oceana Grill sued Ramsay and the show's production company alleging fabrication. Specifically, they claimed that Ramsay staged a scene where he vomited during his kitchen inspection and planted a mouse in a rodent trap "to manufacture drama for their show." The restaurant also argued that a prior settlement from 2011 (before the episode aired) placed limits on the production company's ability to re-use clips from their episode. The 2018 suit was filed after the production company posted clips of the Oceana Grill episode on Facebook.

== Reception ==
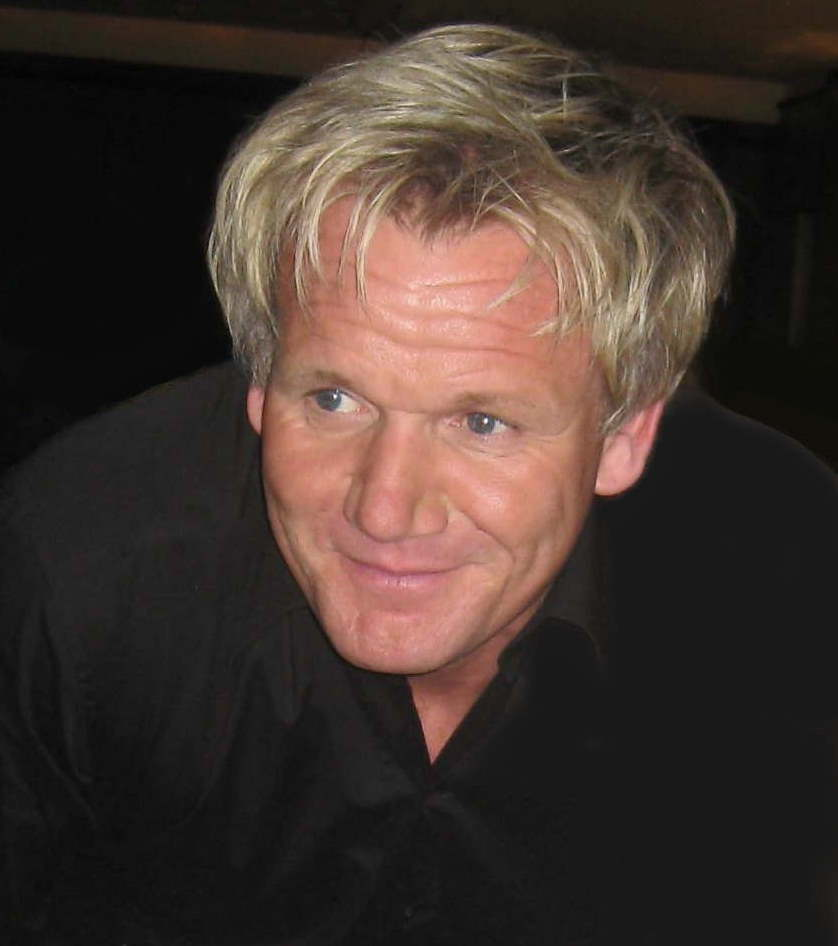
Gordon Ramsay in 2010

Ginia Bellafante of The New York Times found Ramsay's teaching methods and high standards "undeniably hypnotic" and commented, "the thrill of watching Mr. Ramsay is in witnessing someone so at peace with his own arrogance." Doug Elfman of the Chicago Sun-Times said the show is "a very entertaining public service" that "will make you laugh, make you sick, and make you think". Randy Cordova of The Arizona Republic found Ramsay "just as blustery and foul-mouthed here as he is on Hell's Kitchen. But he is also oddly endearing, mainly because he genuinely seems invested in the fate of each restaurant".

Critics have commented that Fox's adaptation of Kitchen Nightmares strayed from the strengths of the original Channel 4 series. Maureen Ryan of the Chicago Tribune said, "Leave it to Fox to take something the Brits did pretty well and muck it up". She added, "Never mind the cooking; this edition of the show appears to be more interested in playing up the family dramas at the restaurants Ramsay visits". Robert Lloyd of the Los Angeles Times commented, "Whereas the British Ramsay's Kitchen Nightmares is fundamentally a food show—it has interesting things to show you about how a restaurant runs and a kitchen works, the wonders of local markets and what you can make from them if you're Gordon Ramsay or willing to follow his instructions—the Fox edition emphasizes mishap, argument, and emotional breakdown almost to the exclusion of cuisine".

== See also ==
- Bar Rescue
- Gordon Ramsay's 24 Hours to Hell and Back
- Gordon Ramsay's Secret Service
- Hotel Hell
- Restaurant: Impossible
- Restaurant Makeover
- Restaurant Stakeout
