= Portas Review =

The Portas Review was carried out in 2011 by retail expert and television personality Mary Portas into issues affecting the retail sector in the United Kingdom, and particularly high streets.

Following the review, Portas pilot areas are 12 English towns that have been chosen to participate in a scheme designed to help to rejuvenate their shopping areas. The government made £1.2m available to fund the schemes.

== Background ==
In May 2011 it was announced that Mary Portas was to carry out a review of many of England's high streets for the Department for Business. The objective being to propose ideas for how the decline of town centres could be halted.

In December 2011 the government published Portas's report. The report recommended that town centres should be run like businesses, that many regulations should be scrapped and rules relaxed and that free car-parking should be made available to attract shoppers.

The competition had 371 bids, 13 towns were selected.

In 2017, research conducted by the Local Data Company (LDC) for BBC Radio 4's You and Yours programme found that there had been a net loss of 969 retail units in the 12 towns. This equated to a drop of 17% over the five years. Interviewed, Portas said the decline in retail units was in line with her earlier predictions for the future of the high street in general. She described the Portas pilot scheme as "a weighted PR campaign which looked like 'Hey, we're doing something' and I hoped it might kick-start something – but it didn't".

Small business owners in the pilot areas were interviewed as saying the scheme had “its own agenda” and “little focus on retail”. Another said, "“The money was used on things that didn’t help the high street, such as websites and a dire food festival. Mary Portas herself was wonderful. She made us buck up our ideas."

== The chosen towns ==
The towns chosen to participate in the scheme were:

- Bedford
- Croydon
- Dartford
- Greater Bedminster
- Liskeard
- Margate
- Market Rasen
- Nelson, Lancashire
- Newbiggin-by-the-Sea
- Stockport
- Stockton-on-Tees
- Wolverhampton
- Ilkeston
