= The Naked Chef =

British TV cooking programme starring Jamie Oliver

- Created by: Patricia Llewellyn
- Developed by: Patricia Llewellyn
- Written by: Patricia Llewellyn
- Starring: Jamie Oliver
- Country of origin: United Kingdom
- Original language: English
- No. of series: 3
- No. of episodes: 25

Production
- Executive producer: Patricia Llewellyn
- Producers: Nina Davies, Nicola Moody
- Editors: Michael Peatfield, Ian McGlasham
- Camera setup: Luke Cardiff, John Sorapure, Richard Hill, Patrick Acum, Mike Sarah
- Running time: 30 minutes
- Production company: Optomen Television

Original release
- Network: BBC Two
- Release: 14 April 1999 – 19 December 2001

The Naked Chef is a BBC Two cooking programme starring Jamie Oliver. It debuted in April 1999, and originally ran for three series plus three Christmas specials, and was produced by Optomen Television for the BBC. The show was Oliver's television debut, and was noted for its use of jumpy, close-up camera work, and the presenter's relaxed style.

Each episode took its theme from a social situation or event in Oliver's life, such as a hen night or babysitting. In series 1 and 2, except the Christmas specials, Oliver was filmed cooking at a home paid for by the production company. In series 3, the kitchen locations shifted to other venues.

== Episodes ==
† Aired as a special

=== Series 1 (1999) ===
Episode	Air date	Summary
1 Chefs' Night Off	14 April 1999	Oliver cooks for his boss and colleagues, dishes include roast lamb, baked fruit and along with his friend Ben O'Donoghue, they make an Asian seafood starter.
2 Hen Night	21 April 1999	Oliver prepares a meal for his sister's hen night, including baked salmon and a lemon and lime cream tart.
3 Babysitting	28 April 1999	Oliver prepares a fun meal for his three young cousins, including spaghetti with chilli, and praline Semifreddo.
4 The Band	5 May 1999	Oliver heads to London's Chinatown for the ingredients he needs to make a Thai green curry for his band, Scarlet Division.
5 Birthday Party	9 June 1999	It's Oliver's birthday, and he cooks up a party feast for his girlfriend, friends including his mentor Gennaro Contaldo and family.
6 Girlfriend	16 June 1999	With obligations to both the restaurant and the band, Oliver has devoted very little time to his girlfriend, so he attempts to make amends by preparing a romantic lunch for her.
7 Christmas Comes Early†		Oliver finally gets two Christmases, making preserved edible presents and cooking back at his family home in Essex.

=== Series 2 (2000) ===
Episode	Air date	Summary
1 Reunion	12 April 2000	Oliver reunites with his German friend Tim (Tim Mälzer) and they cook together.
2 Girls, Girls, Girls	19 April 2000	Oliver's girlfriend persuades him to join her on a girls' night out clubbing and he prepares some treats for their post-club pyjama party.
3 A Perfect Day	26 April 2000	Oliver goes go karting for the first time and prepares a post-go karting Southeast Asian-inspired meal for his mates and Oliver's fiancé, Juliette "Jools" Norton.
4 Going to the Dogs	3 May 2000	Oliver's friends have never gone to dog races so he invites them over for a meal and they head out with custard tarts in doggie bags.
5 Picnic on the Pier	10 May 2000	Oliver prepares a special picnic hamper for a trip with his cousins to Southend-on-Sea.
6 A Bun in the Oven	17 May 2000	Oliver cooks a celebratory yet hearty meal for his pregnant sister and his brother-in-law Paul.
7 Birthday Barbeque	24 May 2000	Oliver does an indoor birthday barbeque for his friend Ben O'Donoghue who is returning to Australia.
8 Wedding Bells	31 May 2000	Oliver and his fiancée Jools entertain their respective future in-laws.
9 Christmas in New York †	20 December 2000	Oliver crosses the pond to stage in New York Restaurant Danube under chef David Bouley as well as making food and hosting a Christmas party. It is the only hour-long episode in the whole series.

=== Series 3 (2001) ===
Episode	Air date	Summary
1 Moving House	16 October 2001	Since the oven has yet to be installed in their new flat, Oliver uses his portable camping stove to whip up a steak sarnie for the removal van men. After a picnic lunch, he prepares chilli con carne, salad, and cocktails for a house-warming party.
2 Rock and Roast	23 October 2001	Oliver heads to vocalist Jay Kay's mansion to cook for Oliver's favourite band, Jamiroquai. While they're busy rehearsing, he prepares roast beef with all the trimmings, plus a pine-nut and honey tart.
3 Godfather	30 October 2001	Oliver is made a Godfather to the daughter of his friend David Loftus. He cooks a Christening lunch, preparing oysters, roasted brill with lemons, roasted asparagus with pancetta and summer fruit and prosecco jelly.
4 Highland Fling	6 November 2001	On a trip to the Scottish Isles, Oliver meets up with a friend who dives and cooks scallops with asparagus and baby leeks, prawns with oregano and chilli, marinated lamb, and rich chocolate mousse for his friend and other divers.
5 Curryfest	13 November 2001	Oliver meets up with Chef Das Sreedharan, makes two kinds of Indian pickles, heads to his friend's house to prepare curry dishes for his mates after a night of pool.
6 Back to School	20 November 2001	Oliver teaches students at his alma mater Newport Free Grammar School how to cook for an awards dinner and gives a speech. Dishes include a mozzarella salad, chicken and mushrooms in a bag, chocolate Cambridge cream, and easy-to-make ginger beer.
7 The Italian Job	27 November 2001	Oliver pays a visit to his mentor, Gennaro Contaldo to see if Gennaro approves of his new recipe for parsnip and pancetta tagliatelle and afterwards heads to a country home to make a figs salad, roast duck and queens pudding for Gennaro and his friends.
8 At the Beach	4 December 2001	Oliver rides the surf in North Cornwall with his Australian chef friends and prepares brunch breads, yoghurt with blueberry and elderflower, salmon with herbs in newspaper, potatoes garlic and rosemary on the barbeque, and beef with soy sauce and ginger.
9 Christmas Party†	19 December 2001	Oliver ropes some friends into taking a "booze cruise" to Calais, while, back home, a cavernous warehouse is turned into a welcoming party place for Christmas. He also prepares finger food that includes Japanese pork rolls and Sicilian Cannoli.
