= Amy's Ride =

Amy's Ride is a series of non competitive bicycle rides held in various states of Australia, by the Amy Gillett Foundation, in the memory of Amy Gillett who died in a road accident in Germany. Money raised is spent on efforts to reduce the incidence of motorist/cyclist road accidents.

The 2007 event around Geelong and the Bellarine Peninsula in Victoria, attracted 2700 riders and consisted of three options:

- Road route around the Bellarine Peninsula
- Bellarine Peninsula rail trail route
- Circuits of the Geelong Botanic Gardens in Eastern Park, Geelong

== See also ==
- Cycling in Victoria
