= Amy's Candy Bar =

Confectionery store in Chicago, Illinois

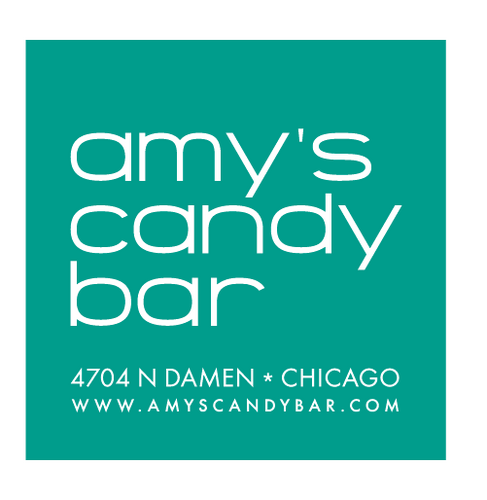
- Type: Private
- Industry: Confectioneries; Baked goods
- Founded: Chicago, Illinois, United States (June 2011)
- Founder: Amy Hansen
- Headquarters: Chicago, United States
- Number of locations: 1
- Website: amyscandybar.com

Amy's Candy Bar is a confectionery store located in Chicago. The store was opened in June 2011 and is owned by Amy Hansen, a graduate of Chicago's French Pastry School. The store is well known for its caramels which are made in house. The store has been recognized by Food & Wine and was also featured on the talk show Steve Harvey.

== History ==
The store's owner, Amy Hansen, graduated from Chicago's French Pastry School at Kennedy-King College in 2006. Hansen had worked in various positions in the marketing industry until 2010, after being laid-off, when she began planning to open a candy store. Hansen was able to obtain a grant from the Small Business Improvement Fund from the Chicago city government in addition to a small business loan to assist with starting costs and redesigning the interior. In June 2011, the store opened at its present location along Damen Avenue in the Ravenswood neighborhood. The store was designed to appear as a European-style boutique, which is reflected in the glass jars lining the walls that store the various products.

== Products ==
Amy's Candy Bar carries a variety of chocolate, gummies, and licorice products, and sells over 200 different candies. While products are generally domestic, many sweets are imported from various parts of Europe such as Germany, Belgium, and the Netherlands. In addition, Amy's Candy Bar also carries caramels and nougat that are made by Hansen. The recipe for the homemade caramels and its other varieties was inspired from the French Pastry School, and consists of a butter from Europe, sea salt, glucose, organic cream, and vanilla bean. The caramels are considered to be a highlight of the establishment.

The store also features a selection of ice cream and can also provide customized baked goods such as sugar cookies and cupcakes.

== Awards and recognition ==
In 2015, Amy's Candy Bar was recognized by Time magazine in an article, "These Are America's Best Candy Shops", and also highlighted some of the products made in house including sea-salt caramels and their OMG Candy Bar. It was also named "Coolest Candy Store" by Time Out Chicago Kids, and was included on Food & Wine's Ultimate Candy Guide as well as their "5 Best New Candy Shops". In addition, the store was featured on the talk show Steve Harvey, and was given one year of free access to an e-commerce platform to begin online sales of their products.
