= Optomen =

Television production company

- Type: Subsidiary
- Industry: Television production Mass media
- Founded: 1988; 38 years ago
- Headquarters: London, United Kingdom; New York City, United States
- Key people: Tina Flintoff and Nick Hornby (joint CEOs)
- Parent: All3Media (2010–2026); Banijay UK (2026–present)
- Divisions: Optomen Entertainment
- Subsidiaries: One Potato Two Potato
- Website: www.optomen.com

Optomen is an independent television production company part of Banijay UK, with Optomen Television Ltd. for the United Kingdom and Optomen Productions Inc. (launched in 2002) for the United States. It specializes in unscripted programming.

== Broadcasting ==
=== United Kingdom and the United States ===
Optomen produces a variety of television shows for United Kingdom broadcasters including the BBC, ITV, Channel 4, Sky1, Good Food and Discovery. In the United States, Optomen has produced directly for, or co-produced with, Fox, HBO, A&E, Discovery, TLC, PBS, and Food Network.

=== International ===
Optomen International is its distribution arm which sells its completed programmes worldwide, the most popular being The F Word, Kitchen Nightmares, Great British Menu, and Police Camera Action!.

== List of programmes ==
Title	Broadcaster	Transmission date	Episodes	Running time per episode
Anatomy of Disgust	Channel 4	2000	3	49 minutes
Boy Meets Girl	Channel 4	2001	3	49 minutes
Can Animals Predict Disaster?	PBS Nature		1	60 minutes
Crazy Drivers	Bravo	2003	13	25 minutes
D-Day Despatches	ITV	2004	5	15 minutes
Eating With...	BBC Two		8	30 minutes
First Catch Your Hare: Hannah Glasse	BBC Four		1	30 minutes
Food Glorious Food	ITV	2013	9	60 minutes
French Leave	Channel 4	2003	10	30 minutes
Gangland Graveyard	PBS/Channel 4		1	60 minutes
Giada in Paradise	Television Food Network		2	60 minutes
Gordon Ramsay's F Word	Channel 4	2005	9	60 minutes
Great British Weddings	Sky One		3	60 minutes
Green: The New Red, White & Blue	Discovery Channel		1	90 minutes
Hell's Kitchen	Fox	2005		60 minutes
If You Can't Stand The Heat	Channel 4	1999		
It's A Girl Thing	Channel 4	2001	6	24 minutes
Japanese Schoolgirls	Discovery Science		2	30 minutes
Jump London	Channel 4			
Kitchen Criminals	BBC Two		20	30 minutes
Making Slough Happy	BBC Two	2005	4	60 minutes
Market Kitchen	Good Food	2007		
Mary Queen of Shops	BBC Two		4	60 minutes
MasterChef	FOX	2010		60 minutes
Mind of a Millionaire	BBC Two	2003	4	60 minutes
Most Evil	Discovery Channel			
Matilda and the Ramsay Bunch	CBBC	2015–2019	75	15 minutes
Old Bear Stories	Carlton Television	1993–1997	3	10 mins
One Fat Lady, One Large Life	BBC Two	1999		
Police Camera Action!	ITV	1994–2010		30 minutes
The Princess Diaries	ITV2	2025–present	12	60 minutes
Ramsay's Kitchen Nightmares	Channel 4/Fox	2003		60 minutes
Red Gold	WNET/Thirteen/Channel 4		3	49 minutes
Return of the Chef	Channel 4	2005	8	30 minutes
Role Reversal	Arts & Entertainment Network	2003	1	120 minutes
Saturday Cookbook	ITV Breakfast	2012	21	44 minutes
Secret Lives of Gypsy Wives	Channel 4	2026	6	60 minutes
Sex BC	Channel 4	2002	2	49 minutes
Spirituality Shopper	Channel 4	2005		
The Great British Menu	BBC Two		80	30 minutes
The Naked Chef	BBC Two	1999		
Two Fat Ladies	BBC Two	1996–1999	24	30 minutes
Two Men in a Trench	BBC Two	2002–2004	12	50 minutes
Tyler's Ultimate	Food Network	2003	26	22 minutes
Worst Cooks in America	Food Network	2010	22	60 minutes
You're Not the Man I Married	Lifetime		13	30 minutes

== Publications ==
Optomen has also published books to accompany the following programmes: The F Word, Great British Menu, Kitchen Nightmares, Two Fat Ladies, and The Naked Chef.

== Awards ==
The company has won many awards over the years, including an International Emmy, three BAFTAs, three Royal Television Society awards, three Indie awards, and two Glenfiddich awards.

== Sale to All3Media ==
On 13 August 2010, it was announced that Optomen had been acquired by All3Media in a £40 million takeover. The agreement saw All3Media take control of Optomen along with its New York-based subsidiary Optomen Productions Inc and One Potato Two Potato, which was established as a joint venture with Gordon Ramsay.
