= Amy's Baking Company =

- Kitchen Nightmares episode
- Episode no.: Season 6 Episode 16
- Directed by: Jay Hunter
- Production code: 515
- Original air date: May 10, 2013
- Running time: 43 minutes

Episode chronology
← Previous "Chappy's"	Next → "Return to Amy's Baking Company"

"Amy's Baking Company" is the 16th episode of the sixth season of Kitchen Nightmares, and the 82nd episode of the series. The episode first aired on May 10, 2013, and centered on Gordon Ramsay attempting to help Amy and Samy Bouzaglo, owners of Amy's Baking Company in Scottsdale, Arizona.

The episode marked the only time in the history of both the British and the American versions of Kitchen Nightmares that Ramsay was unable to complete the restaurant's transformation due to conflict with the owners. The owners' extreme and inappropriate behaviors received negative attention on social media, and the manner in which they responded further fueled the controversy, prompting Forbes to refer to this as an example of how a business should not react to comments posted on social media.

A follow-up episode, "Return to Amy's Baking Company", aired as the season-seven premiere on April 11, 2014.

== Synopsis ==
Amy's Baking Company
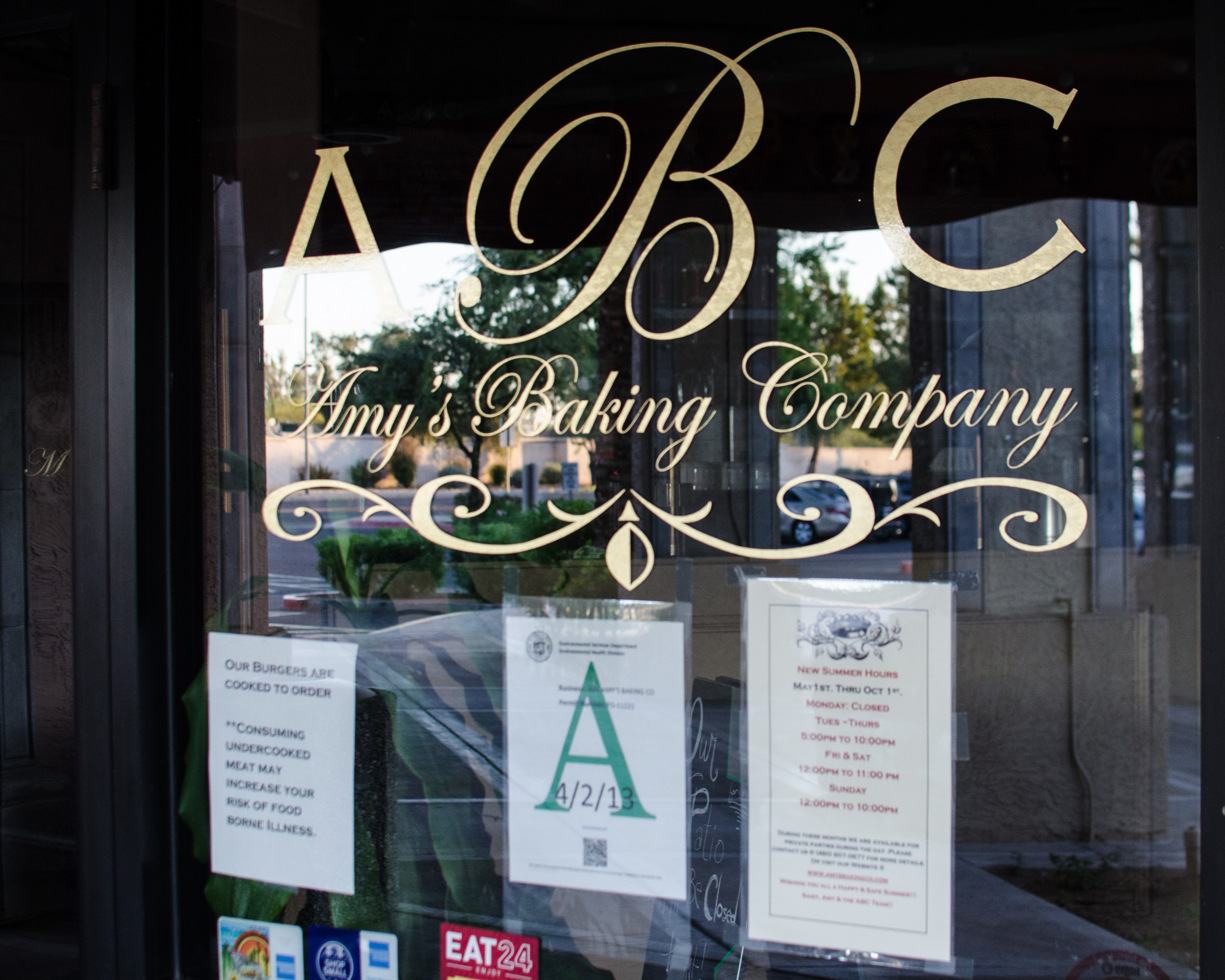
- Entrance of the restaurant in 2013

Restaurant information
- Established: 2007; 19 years ago
- Closed: September 1, 2015; 11 years ago
- Previous owners: Amy Bouzaglo; Samy Bouzaglo
- Head chef: Amy Bouzaglo
- Food type: Baked foods
- Location: 7366 E Shea Blvd Ste 112, Scottsdale, Arizona, 85260, United States
- Website: www.facebook.com/AmysBakingCom/

Amanda "Amy" (née Bossingham) and Salomon "Samy" Bouzaglo, the husband-and-wife owners, explain that Samy invested over a million dollars to build the restaurant in 2007 to "fulfill Amy's dreams". About two years prior to the episode's filming, several local food bloggers remarked negatively about the restaurant's food and the owners' behavior. Amy claims the reviews are "lies" and states that they cost the restaurant a "tremendous amount of business".

The camera crew arrives the night before Ramsay's arrival and witnesses an argument between Samy and a customer (while inside the restaurant) while Amy threatens to call the police. A cameraman intercedes to prevent any violence. He accompanies the customers outside as Amy berates the remaining customers.

Upon his arrival, Ramsay is initially impressed with the kitchen's good hygiene and organization, and by Amy's desserts, but becomes more wary when Amy admits that she closes the restaurant if either of the owners are not there. After the initial discussion, Ramsay samples lunch dishes and responds rather negatively to several of them, one of which he discovers is a mass-produced frozen product despite being advertised on the menu as freshly made. Samy reveals to Ramsay that Amy does not deal well with criticism. Ramsay witnesses unethical and unkind treatment of waitstaff by the owners, who try several times to justify it.

During the dinner service, customers complain about long waiting periods and several send back dishes they dislike. Amy intentionally makes dishes unpalatable for customers she disapproves of and Samy tells dissatisfied customers not to come back. Amy responds defensively to Ramsay's criticism and behaves unprofessionally toward the waitstaff, firing an employee for asking once for confirmation about an order. Ramsay witnesses further questionable treatment of waitstaff, such as the owners taking their tips.

While interviewing former employees, Ramsay discovers that at least fifty people were fired during an eighteen-month period. When Ramsay offers constructive criticism of Amy's and Samy's management style, Amy becomes extremely defensive and Samy reveals that the number of fired employees is closer to 100. After more arguing, Ramsay concludes they are not open to making any changes and gives up. In a concluding monologue, he states that this is the first time he has met restaurant owners that he could not help; the restaurant has gone through a hundred staff members and Amy and Samy have infuriated the local community. They seem incapable of accepting criticism and he believes that they would not have adhered to any changes he would have implemented to improve the restaurant.

== Production ==
The episode was shot in December 2012. On December 10, a local media interview with a diner described his altercation with Samy during taping. The diner saw what he thought was an act for the purposes of the show, but a producer told him "what was happening was real". The diner went on to explain that police were on the scene by the time he left the restaurant. The diner reported that the police were responding to a "911 hang-up call" from the restaurant, and that they left after "concluding everything was fine".

== Reception and reaction ==
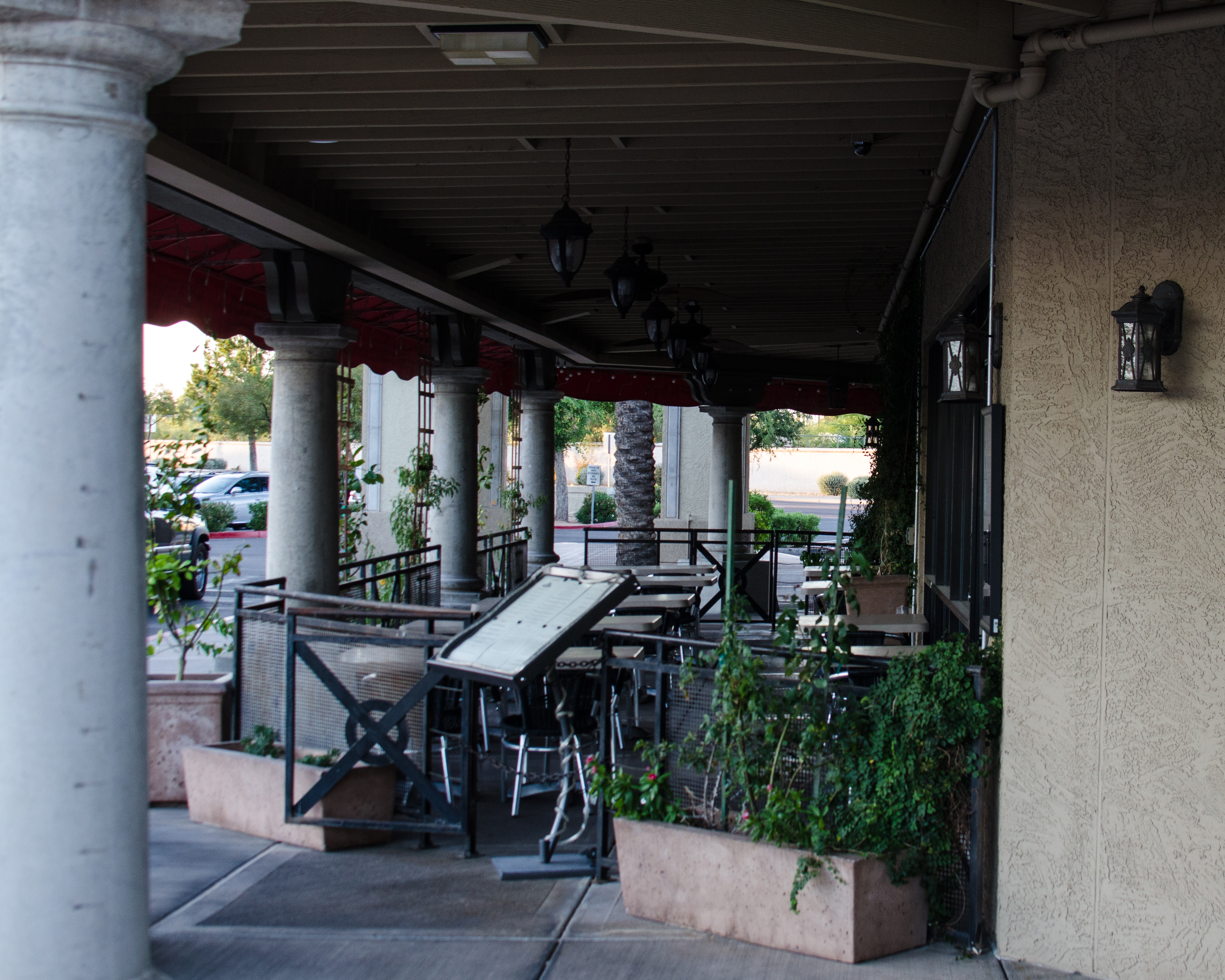
One of the verandas of the restaurant

The episode premiered on May 10, 2013, and was viewed by about 3.34 million people. It was seen by 1.2% of all 18- to 49-year-olds in the United States and 5% of all 18- to 49-year-olds watching television at the time of the broadcast. The episode met with praise from reviewers, with one critic writing, "The episode is nothing short of amazing."

After the show aired, the restaurant, which was located in a shopping center at Scottsdale Road and Shea Boulevard, became a tourist attraction. The restaurant received extensive negative feedback on their official Facebook page. When owners Amy and Samy responded by denouncing people who posted negative comments, they provoked more of the same, not only on Facebook, but also on Yelp and Reddit. Forbes used the reactions as a poster example of how a business should not react to comments on social media. The owners later stated that they were hacked, and that they had not posted any of the comments. The couple later claimed that the dissatisfied customers seen in the episode were "actors" during their appearance on Dr. Phil. This prompted more negative responses and the original comments and responses were eventually removed. As a result of the Kitchen Nightmares episode and Facebook posts, awareness of the incident caused the "meltdown" to go viral.

External videos
- Amy's Baking Company
- via YouTube
- – Full episode

External videos
- Return to Amy's Baking Company
- via YouTube
- – Season 6 special including an interview with Amy and Sammy at the end. Uncensored version by FilmRise.

The company hired a local public relations firm, and a second Facebook page was eventually taken down as well, while another one called "I support Amy's Baking Company Bakery Boutique & Bistro 100 percent" appeared on May 15. A press release announced that they would be holding a "Grand Reopening" on May 21, 2013. The public relations firm resigned the next day.

On April 11, 2014, Kitchen Nightmares aired a special episode revolving around the events at Amy's Baking Company during and after the episode aired with a new, specially recorded interview with the owners conducted by local reporter Ana Garcia.

== After Kitchen Nightmares ==
Amy's Baking Company permanently closed on September 1, 2015. Amy Bouzaglo explained that the development stemmed from problems with the building's former landlord, and not the TV series. She also indicated her future career plans included making desserts for a Phoenix-area restaurant group and producing online instructional cooking videos.

The owners moved to California in 2016, and later to Israel in 2018 following Samy's deportation, which USA Today and 12 News reported had occurred because of Samy's failure to disclose that he had served time in prison for extortion and drug charges overseas. (Amy was originally from Phoenix and Samy was born in Morocco; Amy had served time in prison from 2008 to 2009 for writing fraudulent checks while married to her first husband.)

In 2021, Amy Bouzaglo gave an interview to the New York Post discussing her experience on the show. She stated that production staff had "rearranged" ingredients in the kitchen and "sabotaged" their POS system. The customers recruited by the producers were also allegedly the "same ones who had left negative reviews" beforehand. Bouzaglo also defended taking waiters' tips, saying that they were paid $8 to $14/hour. She also stated the decision to have production end after one day was hers, not Ramsay's or the producers', and she asked that the episode not air.

In April 2022, Amy returned to the United States and filed for divorce, while Samy remained in Israel. She continues to post baking content on social media. Amy began an Instagram account with the name Amy's Baking Company, on which she posts videos of herself making desserts. As of August 2024, she had over 30,000 followers.
