= Amy's Law (Georgia) =

Amy's Law is a Georgia state law passed in response to outrage generated when a twelve-year-old boy convicted of murdering Amy Yates was sentenced to two years in juvenile prison, the maximum penalty allowed for minors in Georgia at the time. Unanimously passed by the Georgia Senate in 2006, Amy's Law permits sentencing juveniles to incarceration until age 21 if convicted of murder.

== Background ==
On April 26, 2004, eight-year-old Amy Yates went missing while riding her bike around her trailer park in Carrollton, Georgia. Her body was found later that evening, at the bottom of a nearby hill, and the heavy bruising on her chest and neck areas indicated that she had been strangled to death.

The day after Amy was found, police summoned a few boys from Amy's neighborhood, including Johnathon Adams, for questioning. Without a parent or lawyer present, Adams was interrogated for more than two and a half hours, during which time he confessed to accidentally killing Amy. When the police allowed Adams' parents to speak with him after his confession, however, Adams retracted the confession. Despite accusations of police coercion, a judge ruled that Adams' statement could be used as evidence in court. Adams was held in juvenile detention until his murder conviction in 2005, at which point he was moved to a rehabilitation center.

Nearly two years after the crime, Chris Gossett, a mentally disabled teenager, confessed to killing Amy, though Gossett later retracted his statement. As of October 2006, Gossett was not charged in connection to the Yates case. Despite resistance from police and the prosecution, who claimed they got it right the first time, both a grand jury and a judge investigating the case eventually ruled to exonerate Adams and indict Gossett on manslaughter charges. However, the charges against Gossett were formally dropped in 2010.

Thomas Yates, the victim's father who originally championed Adams' guilt and lobbied for stricter sentences against minors convicted of murder, later criticized the way the police and prosecution had handled the case. In an interview, Yates stated that "[t]he case was botched from day one. All the valuable evidence that could have been gathered was lost in the beginning. Our hopes of ever getting justice for our daughter — I don’t see any hope for that.” As of July 2017, the case remains unsolved.

== See also ==
- American juvenile justice system
- Comparative juvenile criminal law
- False confession
- Juvenile Justice and Delinquency Prevention Act
- Official Code of Georgia Annotated
