= Mary Queen of Shops =

- Genre: Documentary
- Created by: Optomen
- Presented by: Mary Portas
- Country of origin: United Kingdom
- Original language: English
- No. of series: 3
- No. of episodes: 16

Production
- Running time: 60 minutes

Original release
- Network: BBC Two
- Release: 31 May 2007 – 24 June 2010

Mary Queen of Shops is a British television series presented by Mary Portas broadcast on BBC Two. The series began with a four-week run starting on 7 June 2007, and returned for a second series of six episodes beginning on 9 June 2008. A third three-part series, titled Mary Queen of Charity Shops, began on 2 June 2009. The show returned for a fourth series on 7 June 2010, featuring various independent shops, rather than just fashion boutiques. The title of the programme is a play on Mary, Queen of Scots' name.

In each episode, Mary Portas troubleshoots her way around the UK on a mission to help turn around struggling fashion boutiques. Mary is a leading retail communications expert and is the founder and creative director of Yellowdoor. Her aim is to turn the businesses around and put glamour back into shopping. First, she visits the boutiques while the owners are away. Then she revamps them, gets the shop owners right up-to-date and hopefully helps them to start making money again. In season 3, Mary takes on other retail shops.

Mary Queen of Shops premiered in the United States on 14 August 2009 on BBC America. The programme also airs on GEM HD in Australia.
